= John Orlando Summerhayes =

Medical missionary and surgeon (1869–1942)

John Orlando Summerhayes (February 7, 1869 – October 28, 1942) was a medical missionary and surgeon in British India from November 3, 1893, to November 7, 1908, with stations in Dera Ghazi Khan, Pakistan; Quetta, Pakistan; and Kerman, Iran. He was head director of the Quetta Medical Hospital. His spouse, whom he met on his mission, Lucy Alexa Heathcote Summerhayes (née Currie), a midwife and educator, was often described as sharing his work. Summerhayes was a distinguished military officer who served in World War I and commanded his army ambulance corps team in the Royal Ambulance Medical Corps (RAMC). He was the second colonel of three to escort Emperor Charles I and the royal family of Austria-Hungary into exile after the war.

== Early life ==
=== Personal life ===
John Orlando Summerhayes was born on February 7, 1869, in Ealing, England to William Summerhayes and Henrietta Summerhayes. He lived in Brightling Mount, Sussex and was baptized on March 19, 1869. On January 19, 1895, John Orland Summerhayes married Lucy Alexa Heathcote Currie. Lucy was the daughter of Robert Currie and the granddaughter of Sir. Frederick Currie who served as the Foreign Secretary of State to India's government and Punjab's Governor for a time. She was also a fellow missionary and hospital nurse with a midwifery certificate. Together, they had eight children. John died on October 28, 1942, at Newhaven.

=== Education ===
Summerhayes attended Yarmouth Grade School and Schorne College before receiving medical training at St. Mary's Hospital and London & Barrow-in-Furness Hospital. He received certificates of L.R.C.P (Licentiate of the Royal College of Physicians) from London & M.R.C.S (Membership of the Royal College of Surgeons) from England. In January 1892, for 6 months, Summerhayes trained for missionary service as a doctor at the Church Misisonary College before departing for his journey.

== Mission ==
=== Medical Missionary Service ===
As a part of the Medical Missionary Service, Summerhayes was stationed in Pakistan (Quetta and Dera Ghazi Khan) and Iran (Kerman). He would often travel back and forth many times in between his missionary stationings in the Middle East and England. John Orlando Summerhayes' missionary journey started on November 8, 1893, when he was stationed at the Punjab & Sindh Mission in Dera Ghazi Khan, Pakistan. In 1987, he returned to England and upon returning, became the lead surgeon at the Good Shepherd Hospital (Christian Missionary Hospital) in Quetta in 1898. On October 3, 1902, Sumerhayes went to the medical mission in Kerman. There, he worked with medical missionary Mary Bird who praised him and even expressed regret when he left for his own hospital, the Good Shepherd Hospital, in Quetta in March 1903. He returned to England on special leave on September 22, 1906, before traveling back to Quetta in March 1908. Lucy Summerhayes retired in 1906 while John Summerhayes resigned in 1908 from their roles as medical missionaries.

=== Quetta ===
Summerhayes worked in the Christian Missionary Society (CMS) Hospital, first known as the Good Shepherd Hospital, starting from March 1903 until March 1908. He was head surgeon at the medical mission in Quetta and ran the hospital. Summerhayes was described as a man of great reputation from his past misisonary stations due to his strong faith, sportsmanship, sense of humor, physical fitness, bravery, and charisma. He made sure to take care of everyone and regularly taught the native people. Lucy Summerhayes was praised just as much for her commitment to spreading Christianity and always being willing to serve others. The hospital was first built in 1900 by the Quetta Medical Mission founder, Dr. Sutton. Beginning in 1900, the hospital was not yet large, containing twenty-eight hospital beds for patients, but its size had steadily grown over the years. The hospital still stands today and is now named the Mission Hospital.

== Military service ==
Summerhayes joined World War I as a medical officer in the RAMC, and rose in rank to commanded the South Midland Field Ambulance as the lieutenant colonel of his team. He was a part of the 4th Battalion Oxfordshire & Buckinghamshire Light Infantry in France and Italy. In 1916, Summerhayes was awarded the Distinguished Service Order (D.S.O) for his valiant service in WWI. He received the Territorial Decoration in the 1st South Midland Field Ambulance from the King on 12 October 1920.

=== Ranks ===
- Captain in the Baluchistan Volunteer Rifles [in India]
- Lieutenant in the 4th Battalion, the Oxfordshire and Buckinghamshire Light Infantry, on 1 June 1909
- Lieutenant in Notts and Derby Field Ambulance, Royal Army Medical Corps on 8 February 1913
- Captain in RAMC on 6 December 1914
- Major in RAMC on 25 April 1915
- Acting Lieutenant Colonel on 22 May 1918 – 20 March 1919

=== POWs ===
- Summerhayes was recognized in the Western Times, a British newspaper, in 1918 as the British Red Cross Mission chief for the treatment of prisoners of war (POWs).
- In Austria where he was stationed, he revealed the bleak prospects of the people there due to starvation, bringing attention to the need for assistance.
- He was employed on similar military missions for POWs in Hungary, Czechoslovakia, and Silesia.

=== Military escort to Charles I ===
After the end of WWI, Summerhayes was chosen to protect the last Austrian-Hungarian Emperor Charles I in Ekartsau, replacing the first military escort Sir Thomas Montgomery-Cuninghame, 10th Baronet. He was assigned to his role by King George V of the United Kingdom after working in Germany and Austria to lead prisoners-of-war out of their countries. Emperor Charles I wrote a letter to King George thanking him for sending Colonel Summerhayes for his protection. The last royal Austrian-Hungarian family was provided these escorts because socialist regimes were taking over Vienna, Austria after WWI and there was fear of a potential assassination. He wrote that Summerhayes was charming and fulfills his duty as a virtuous and clever man. Furthermore, Summerhayes' cheerful character was able to brighten the mood of the royal family during their stay in Eckartsau, providing emotional and medical support. Summerhayes was replaced by Edward Lisle Strutt, another British Army Colonel, as protector to emperor.

After serving as the second escort to Charles, Summerhayes was then sent to accompany Archduke Felix, the fourth child of Charles I, to Switzerland to monitor his health.

== British Medical Association ==
After the war, Summerhayes continued to advance his career, serving as chairman of the several Divisions of the B.M.A (British Medical Association)

- Oxford Division from 1923 to 1924
- Brighton Division in 1932
- Oxford and Reading in 1925

== Later life and legacy ==
John Orlando Summerhayes was recognized for his good nature, competence as a surgeon, and military achievements particulars service to POWs. He was well-received and commended for his accomplishments in various missions, and continued to see patients with his own medical practice in Thames after retiring from missionary service.

Later on, Summerhayes began his own successful practice and worked as a police surgeon and officer for the community. He retired as a Certifying Surgeon in the Factory Department of the Home Office in August 1926 then moving to the same position in Newhaven, Sussex the following month. He was appointed to the Panel Committee and the East Sussex Insurance Committee which he became chairman of in 1934.

Thus, throughout his life, Summerhayes not only served various populations as a medical professional, but also he brought attention to the different conditions of people around the world and took on leadership positions to further advances in medicine.

== Bibliography ==
- “1801–1894 Register of Missionaries.” Church Missionary Society Periodicals – Adam Matthew Digital, Crowther Mission Studies Library, www.churchmissionarysociety.amdigital.co.uk/Documents/Details/CMS_OX_Register_01. Accessed 16 Oct. 2024.
- "Archduke Felix of Austria." Times, 24 Sept. 2011, p. 88. The Times Digital Archive, link-gale-com.proxy.library.upenn.edu/apps/doc/IF0504279420/GDCS?u=upenn_main&sid=bookmark-GDCS&xid=559bae38. Accessed 3 Dec. 2024.
- Brook-Shepherd, Gordon. The Last Habsburg Gordon Brook-Shepherd. Weybrigh and Talley, Inc., 1968.
- “[Dr. John Orlando Summerhayes].” The British Medical Journal, vol. 2, no. 4277, 1942, pp. 769–769. JSTOR, http://www.jstor.org/stable/20324990. Accessed 19 Oct. 2024.
- John Orlando Summerhayes Lt. Colonel-DSO, Ancestry Library, www.ancestrylibrary.com/family-tree/person/tree/75316988/person/46314345310/facts?sort=-created. Accessed 3 Dec. 2024.
- "Health facilities having EPI- sites in Balochistan". Federal Directorate of Immunication, Government of Pakistan. 2023. Accessed November 18, 2024.
- "Medal card of Summerhayes, John Orlando Corps: Oxfordshire and Buckinghamshire..." The National Archive. https://discovery.nationalarchives.gov.uk/details/r/D5440430. Accessed 3. Dec. 2024.
- "Oct 1937, The Mission Hospital – Church Missionary Society Periodicals – Adam Matthew Digital". www.churchmissionarysociety.amdigital.co.uk. Retrieved 2024-11-23.
- Rice, Clara C. “Catalog Record: Mary Bird in Persia.” Catalog Record: Mary Bird in Persia | HathiTrust Digital Library, Church Missionary Society, catalog.hathitrust.org/Record/007682706. Accessed 21 Oct. 2024.
- “Statistical Atlas of Christian Missions : Containing a Directory of Missionary Societies, a Classified Summary of Statistics, an Index of Mission Stations, ...” HathiTrust, hdl.handle.net/2027/umn.31951d01247260k?urlappend=%3Bseq. Accessed 3 Dec. 2024.
- “The Discovery Service.” Medal Card of Summerhayes, John Orlando Corps: Oxfordshire and Buckinghamshire... | The National Archives, The National Archives, 12 Aug. 2009, discovery.nationalarchives.gov.uk/details/r/D5440430.
- The Medical Who's Who. London: The Fulton-Manders Publishing Co., 19141917.
- The Mission Hospital, Volume 41, Issue 477. 1937. London: Church Missionary Society. Available through: Adam Matthew, Marlborough, Church Missionary Society Periodicals, http://www.churchmissionarysociety.amdigital.co.uk/Documents/Details/CMS_CRL_Mission_1937_10 [Accessed December 3, 2024].
- The National Archives; Kew, London, England; 1871 England Census; Class: RG10; Piece: 1317; Folio: 102; Page: 11; GSU roll: 838783
- "Vienna's Plight." Western Times, 24 Dec. 1918, p. 8. British Library Newspapers, link.gale.com/apps/doc/GR3220982492/GDCS?u=upenn_main&sid=bookmark-GDCS&xid=58432982. Accessed 3 Dec. 2024.
- Werkmann von Hohensalzburg, Karl Martin, freiherr, 1878–, and I. E. Lockhart. The Tragedy of Charles of Habsburg. London: P. Allan & co, 1924.
