= Gordon Brook-Shepherd =

Fred Gordon Brook-Shepherd, CBE (born Fred Gordon Shepherd; 24 March 1918, Nottingham - 24 January 2004, London) was a British intelligence agent, journalist, and historian. Stationed in Europe during World War II and in Vienna during Austria's occupation by the allies, he became a noted expert on the recent history of the country, especially on the lives of the last ruling Habsburgs, the psychological and political turbulence of the interwar period, and the Anschluss. He also wrote on the subject of British and Soviet intelligence.

== Early life ==
Gordon Brook-Shepherd, né Shepherd, was born on 24 March 1918 in Nottingham. His father, an architect, died in World War I. Educated at Latymer Upper School, Brook-Shepherd showed an early gift for linguistics. He was reading history at Peterhouse, Cambridge when World War II approached. He graduated with distinction in 1939 and passed the entrance exam for the Indian Civil Service shortly before war was declared.

== Career ==
On vacation in Europe shortly before the outbreak of World War II, Brook-Shepherd noticed that many of Nazi Germany's new autobahnen led directly to France. An article he wrote about his observation back in the United Kingdom attracted the attention of British intelligence, which promptly decided to recruit him and send him back on a second trip. Trying to concentrate on his degree, Brook-Shepherd originally refused but eventually gave in. He spent the war on the Continent, acting as a liaison to various resistance groups in German-occupied Europe. He ended the war as a lieutenant colonel.

In 1945, Germany having collapsed and Austria having been occupied by the Four Powers, Brook-Shepherd was sent to work for the British High Commission in Vienna. He worked as a secretary for the Joint Intelligence Committee; his office was the former sitting room of Empress Zita in Schönbrunn Palace, a place that had long fascinated him. He formed friendships in aristocratic circles in Vienna and eventually married one of their members, Lorle von Brück-Sochor.

Brook-Shepherd was demobilized in 1948, returned to England, and secured employment with the Daily Telegraph. When the Communists seized power in Czechoslovakia mere days later, the Telegraph swiftly sent him back to Europe. He spent time in blockaded Berlin, then returned to Vienna, a centre of espionage activity at the time. He was sent on numerous missions into neighbouring Eastern Bloc countries; most notably, he was reporting from Budapest during the October 1956 Hungarian Uprising.

Brook-Shepherd also reported from the Middle East and India; he was in Cairo during the Suez Crisis.

When the Allied occupation of Austria ended in 1955, Vienna's importance as a hub of intelligence gathering declined. Brook-Shepherd returned to London again, continuing to work for the Telegraph. In 1961, he became a diplomatic correspondent for the newly launched Sunday Telegraph; he later became its deputy editor. He also began writing books. In addition to his work as a journalist and historian, Brook-Shepherd served on a number of committees furthering Anglo-Austrian relations. From 1991 to 1999, he was the chairman of SOS Children's Villages UK.

== Historiographical work ==
Brook-Shepherd focused on the recent history of Central Europe and that of Austria in particular; as one of the few British experts on Austria at the time, he found a ready market. He would come to be acknowledged as an expert on the Habsburgs in particular. His 1997 survey The Austrians, a history of the fall of the Austro-Hungarian Empire and the demoralized Austrian rump state's consequent struggles to find a new identity for itself, inspired a television series.

He was a friend, and the authorised biographer, of Empress Zita and Otto von Habsburg.

Brook-Shepherd's two most influential books on Austrian history are Dollfuss, his eponymous 1961 biography of the interwar Austrofascist dictator, and Anschluss, his 1963 account of the incorporation of Austria into the German Reich. Dollfuss was hailed as "overdue". Anschluss was compared favourably with earlier studies on the subject by Ulrich Eichstädt and Jürgen Gehl; Brook-Shepherd received praise for his "intimate, personal knowledge of places and people" and for his "psychological insight linked with critical detachment". While Gehl described the Anschluss mainly as the result of Hermann Göring's forceful personality and Hitler's vacillating indecision, Brook-Shepherd took a more systemic view. Starting his account in 1931, earlier than other historians at the time, he emphasised the roles of impersonal social forces as well as happenstance; he also ascribed comparatively complex sets of mutually contradictory personal and ideological goals to many of the actors. On the other hand, Brook-Shepherd was accused of downplaying, "as an Englishman", the role played by British Appeasement policy.

Brook-Shepherd's second area of interest was the recent history of British and Soviet intelligence; his work on those subjects was characterized by his unique network of contacts and access to archives. Two of his books on British intelligence operations, the 1988 Storm Birds and the 2000 Iron Maze, became objects of controversy.

== Death ==
Brook-Shepherd died on 24 January 2004, aged 85.

== Awards ==
- 1979: Officer's Cross of the Grand Decoration of Honour
- 1987: Commander of the Order of the British Empire

== Selected publications ==
- Brook-Shepherd, Gordon (1954). Russia's Danubian Empire. William Heinemann.
- — (1957). The Austrian Odyssey. Macmillan.
- Shepherd, Gordon (1960). Where the Lion Trod. Macmillan.
- Brook-Shepherd, Gordon (1961). Dollfuss. Macmillan.
- — (1963). Anschluss. The Rape of Austria. London: Macmillan. ISBN 978-1-349-81669-9.
- — (1966). The Eferding Diaries: A Novel. Lippincott.
- — (1966). Eagle and Unicorn. Weidenfeld & Nicolson.
- — (1968). The Last Habsburg. London: Weidenfeld & Nicolson.
- — (1972). Between Two Flags: The Life of Baron Sir Rudolf von Slatin Pasha, G.C.V.O., K.C.M.G., C.B. Weidenfeld & Nicolson.
- — (1975). Uncle of Europe: The Social and Diplomatic Life of Edward VII. Collins.
- — (1977). The Storm Petrels: The Fight of the First Soviet Defectors, 1928–1938. Ballantine Books.
- — (1981). November 1918: The Last Act of the Great War. Collins. ISBN 978-0-002-16558-7.
- — (1984). Victims at Sarajevo: The Romance and Tragedy of Franz Ferdinand and Sophie. London: Harvill Press. ISBN 0-002-72007-8.
  - published in the USA as: Archduke of Sarajevo: The Romance and Tragedy of Franz Ferdinand of Austria. Boston: Little, Brown. 1984. ISBN 0-316-10951-7.
- — (1987). Royal Sunset: The European Dynasties and the Great War. Doubleday. ISBN 978-0-385-19849-3.
- — (1988). The Storm Birds: Soviet Post-war Defectors. London: Weidenfeld & Nicolson. ISBN 978-0-297-79464-6.
- — (1991). The Last Empress: The Life and Times of Zita of Austria-Hungary, 1892−1989. HarperCollins. ISBN 978-0-002-15861-9.
- — (1997). The Austrians: A Thousand-Year Odyssey. New York: Carroll and Graf. ISBN 0-786-70400-4.
- — (1999). The Iron Maze: Western Intelligence vs the Bolsheviks. Picador. ISBN 978-0-330-36877-3.
- — (2003). Uncrowned Emperor: The Life and Times of Otto von Habsburg. London: Hambledon and London. ISBN 1-852-85439-1.

=== Translations ===
- Marboe, Ernst, ed. (1958). The Book of Austria. Translated by Brook-Shepherd, Gordon (English ed.). Vienna: Österreichische Staatsdruckerei.
