= 101st Infantry Battalion =

- Active: July 1942 – 16 June 1943
- Allegiance: United States of America
- Branch: United States Army
- Type: Separate infantry battalion
- Decorations: None

Commanders
- Notable commanders: Lt. Col Edward Conrad

The 101st Infantry Battalion (Separate) was an independent battalion on the US Army designed to be formed of Austrian-Americans and Austrian Nationals resident in the United States.

== History ==
In 1942 the United States created several separate infantry battalions composed of Americans of ethnic descent or citizens of certain nations who were not yet American citizens. Amongst them were the 99th Infantry Battalion of Norwegian-Americans, the 100th Infantry Battalion of Japanese-Americans, and the 122nd Infantry Battalion of Greek-Americans. A Polish unit was also proposed but never created.

Zita of Bourbon-Parma, the wife of the last Emperor of Austria supposedly lobbied the American government for such a unit following President Franklin D. Roosevelt's officially declared restoration of an independent Austria to be an American war aim. Three of her sons Carl, Rudolf and Felix von Habsburg served in the unit that served at Camp Atterbury, Indiana. Werner von Trapp also served in the Battalion.

The battalion was disbanded on 16 June 1943.
