= Archduke Felix of Austria =

Last surviving child of Charles I, Emperor of Austria

Archduke Felix
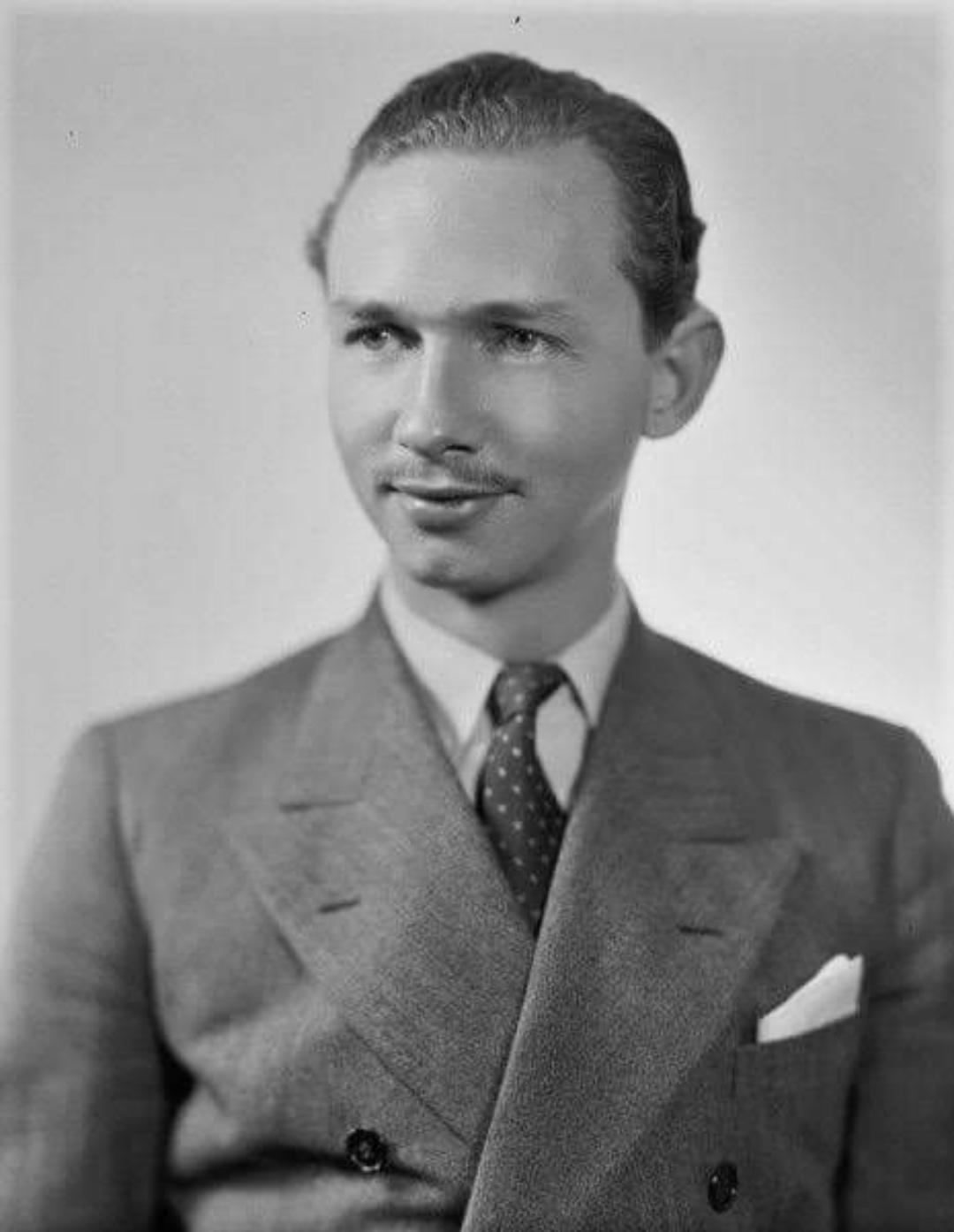
- Archduke Felix in 1930
- Born: 31 May 1916; Schönbrunn Palace, Vienna, Austria-Hungary
- Died: 6 September 2011 (aged 95); San Ángel, Mexico City, Mexico
- Burial: Muri Abbey, Switzerland
- Spouse: Princess & Duchess Anna-Eugénie of Arenberg (m. 1952; died 1997)
- Issue: Maria del Pilar; Carlos Felipe; Kinga; Raimund; Myriam; István; Viridis
Names
- Felix Friedrich August Maria vom Siege Franz Joseph Peter Karl Anton Robert Otto Pius Michael Benedikt Sebastian Ignatius Marcus d'Aviano Habsburg-Lothringen
- House: Habsburg-Lorraine
- Father: Charles I of Austria
- Mother: Princess Zita of Bourbon-Parma

Archduke Felix of Austria, Prince Royal of Hungary and Bohemia (given names: Felix Friedrich August Maria vom Siege Franz Joseph Peter Karl Anton Robert Otto Pius Michael Benedikt Sebastian Ignatius Marcus d'Aviano; 31 May 1916 – 6 September 2011) was the last-surviving child of the last Emperor of Austria, Charles I, and a member of the House of Habsburg-Lorraine. He was a younger brother of former Crown Prince Otto of Austria, who predeceased Felix by two months.

== Early life and exile ==
Archduke Felix was born in the Schönbrunn Palace in Vienna, the third son of the heir presumptive to the throne of Austria-Hungary, the Archduke Charles and his wife Zita of Bourbon-Parma. He was christened at Schönbrunn on 8 June 1916 in the presence of his great-grand uncle Emperor Franz Joseph. His godfather was his great-uncle King Frederick Augustus III of Saxony, brother of his grandmother Princess Maria Josepha of Saxony. On 21 November 1916 Emperor Franz Joseph died and Felix's father succeeded as Emperor of Austria and King of Hungary.

Archduke Felix was less than three years old when Austria-Hungary collapsed following its defeat in the First World War. Republics were declared in the now-separate countries Austria and Hungary, which led to exile of the imperial family. Originally exiled at Wartegg Castle in Switzerland, the imperial family was taken to Portuguese island of Madeira in 1921 after Archduke Felix's father's failed attempts to claim the throne in the Kingdom of Hungary from the regent Miklós Horthy. Colonel John Orlando Summerhayes served as his protector and escort to Switzerland during Archduke Felix's exile. On 1 April 1922 his father Emperor Charles died in Madeira.

In the autumn of 1937, Archduke Felix was permitted to return to Austria, entering the Theresian Military Academy in Wiener Neustadt. He became the first Habsburg since the abolition of the monarchy to pursue a career as an officer in the Austrian Army. With the Anschluss approaching, Archduke Felix, his sister Archduchess Adelheid, and Archduke Eugen fled Austria, crossing the border to Czechoslovakia.

During the Second World War while in the United States, Felix and his brother Carl Ludwig volunteered to serve in the 101st Infantry Battalion, known as the "Free Austria Battalion". However, the battalion was disbanded when a number of the exiled Jewish volunteers who made up the majority of the force ultimately declined to confirm their enlistment.

== Return to Austria ==
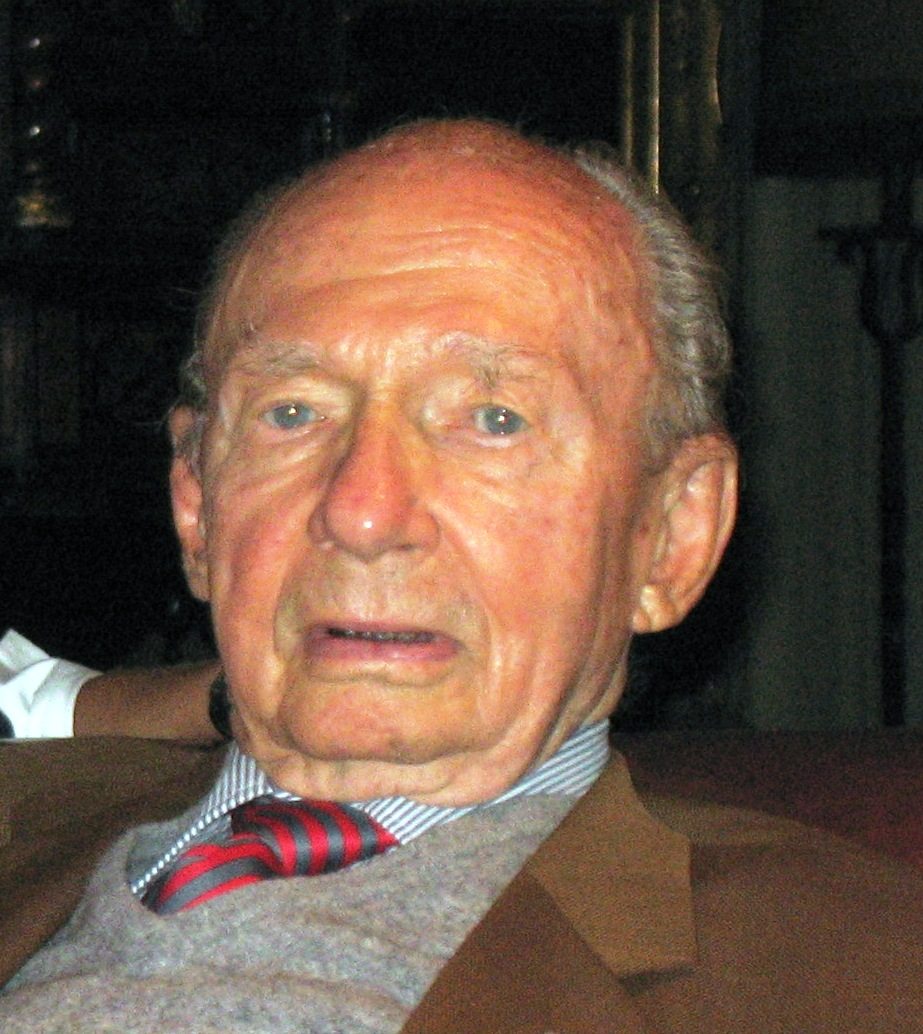
Felix in 2007

Felix, unlike his brother Otto, always refused to renounce his rights to the Austrian throne and membership of the Habsburg family, saying that doing so would violate his human rights. As a result, he was banned from entering Austria except for a brief three-day stay in 1989 in order to attend his mother's funeral. On 10 March 1996, after Austria had joined the European Union and the concurrent dropping of staffed border checkpoints between Austria and other EU countries, he crossed into the country from Germany and held a press conference the next day to announce his illegal arrival. After his presence became known, he was warned by the Austrian government that he would face prosecution if he tried again to enter the country illegally. Ultimately, a deal was reached between Felix, his brother Carl Ludwig and the Austrian government whereby they declared their allegiance to the republic without any reference being made to their rights to the throne or to their membership of the imperial family.

In June 1998, in a joint action with his brother Carl Ludwig, Felix attempted to have the properties restored to them that had been given to their ancestor Maria Theresa of Austria by her husband Francis I, Holy Roman Emperor, but taken from the Habsburg family by Adolf Hitler during the Anschluss. Felix built up a number of successful businesses in Mexico and Brussels, and he worked as a marketing consultant.

During his time in exile, Archduke Felix lived in Portugal, Belgium, Mexico and the United States. He lived in the colonia of San Ángel in Mexico City, where he died 6 September 2011. He was interred in the family crypt at Muri Abbey, near Zürich. The abbey is a favoured burial place of the Habsburg dynasty, and it also contains the remains of his wife and the hearts of his parents.

== Marriage and children ==
Felix was married civilly on 18 November 1952 at Beaulieu, France, and religiously a day later, to Princess and Duchess Anna-Eugénie of Arenberg (1925–1997), a descendant of the 7th Duke of Arenberg. They had seven children, and twenty-six grandchildren. As they all lived in Mexico, and some still do, they are called by the Spanish equivalent of their names:

- Archduchess Maria del Pilar of Austria (born 12 September 1953) married in 1980 Vollrad-Joachim Ritter und Edler von Poschinger (born 1952): one son and four daughters
- Archduke Carlos Felipe of Austria (born 1954) married firstly in 1994 (div. 1997) Martina Donath. Married secondly in 1998 Annie-Claire Lacrambe (born 1959, daughter of Dr. Henri Lacrambe and Fanny Pruvost de Montrichard): two sons, one from his first wife, and one from his second wife
- Archduchess Kinga Barbara of Austria (born 1955) married in 1985 Baron Wolfgang von Erffa (born 1948): one son and four daughters
- Archduke Raimund (Ramón) of Austria (1958–2008) married in 1994 Bettina Götz (born 1969, daughter of Dr. Heinrich Götz and Helga Hager): one son and two daughters
- Archduchess Myriam of Austria (born 1959) married in 1983 Jaime Corcuera Acheson (born 1955, a Mexican citizen, son of Fernando Corcuera de Mier and Lady Mary Virginia Shirley Acheson, daughter of Archibald Acheson, 5th Earl of Gosford): four sons
- Archduke István (Esteban) of Austria (born 1961, twin of Archduchess Viridis) married in 1993 Paola de Temesváry (born 1971, daughter of László Imre de Temesváry and Dr. Maria Csilla Rozenszki): two sons and one daughter
- Archduchess Viridis of Austria (born 1961, twin of Archduke Istvan) married in 1990 Carl Dunning-Gribble, Lord of Marnhull (born 1961, son of Sir Guy Dunning-Gribble): three sons and one daughter

== Honours and patronages ==
- Knight of the Sovereign Military Order of Malta
- Knight of the Order of the Golden Fleece

Along with his brothers Otto and Rudolf, Archduke Felix was a patron for the revived Almanach de Gotha.

== Ancestry ==
Ancestors of Archduke Felix of Austria

8. Archduke Karl Ludwig of Austria
4. Archduke Otto Franz of Austria
9. Princess Maria Annunziata of Bourbon-Two Sicilies
2. Charles I of Austria
10. George of Saxony
5. Princess Maria Josepha of Saxony
11. Infanta Maria Ana of Portugal
1. Archduke Felix of Austria
12. Charles III, Duke of Parma
6. Robert I, Duke of Parma
13. Princess Louise of Artois
3. Princess Zita of Bourbon-Parma
14. Miguel I of Portugal
7. Infanta Maria Antónia of Portugal
15. Princess Adelaide of Löwenstein
