= Zita of Bourbon-Parma =

Empress-queen of Austria-Hungary from 1916 to 1918

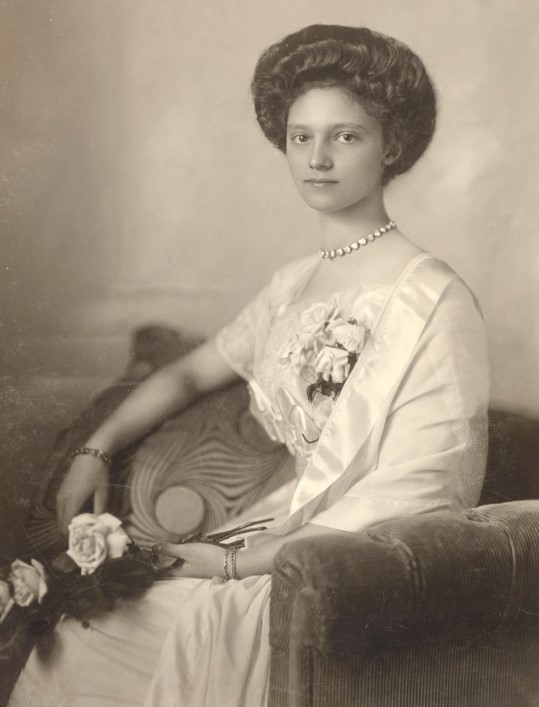
- Photograph by Carl Pietzner, 1911

Empress consort of Austria Queen consort of Hungary
- Tenure: 21 November 1916 – 12 November 1918
- Coronation: 30 December 1916
- Born: 9 May 1892; Villa Borbone delle Pianore, Tuscany, Kingdom of Italy
- Died: 14 March 1989 (aged 96); Zizers, Grisons, Switzerland
- Burial: 1 April 1989: Imperial Crypt (body); Muri Abbey (heart)
- Spouse: Charles I of Austria (m. 1911; died 1922)
- Issue: Otto, Crown Prince of Austria; Archduchess Adelheid; Robert, Archduke of Austria-Este; Archduke Felix; Archduke Carl Ludwig; Archduke Rudolf; Charlotte, Duchess of Mecklenburg-Strelitz; Archduchess Elisabeth, Princess of Liechtenstein
Names
- Zita Maria delle Grazie Adelgonda Micaela Raffaela Gabriella Giuseppina Antonia Luisa Agnese
- House: Bourbon-Parma
- Father: Robert I, Duke of Parma
- Mother: Infanta Maria Antonia of Portugal
- Religion: Catholic Church

Zita of Bourbon-Parma (Zita Maria delle Grazie Adelgonda Micaela Raffaela Gabriella Giuseppina Antonia Luisa Agnese; 9 May 1892 – 14 March 1989) was the last Empress of Austria and Queen of Hungary, in addition to other titles. She ascended to these titles when her husband, Charles I, became the last monarch of Austria-Hungary. She was declared Servant of God by Pope Benedict XVI.

Born as the seventeenth child of the dispossessed Robert I, Duke of Parma, by his second wife, Infanta Maria Antonia of Portugal, Zita married Archduke Charles of Austria in 1911. Charles became heir presumptive to Emperor Franz Joseph I in 1914 after the assassination of his uncle Archduke Franz Ferdinand of Austria, and acceded to the throne in 1916 after the elderly emperor's death.

After the end of World War I in 1918, the Habsburgs were deposed and the former empire became home to the states of Austria, Hungary, and Czechoslovakia, while other parts were annexed to or joined the Kingdom of the Serbs, Croats and Slovenes, Italy, Romania, and a reconstituted independent Poland. Charles and Zita left for exile in Switzerland and, after the failure of attempts to restore royal rule in Hungary, were subsequently removed from that country by the Allies to Madeira, where Charles died in 1922. After her husband's death, Zita and her son Otto served as symbols of unity for the exiled dynasty. A devout Catholic, she raised a large family after being widowed at the age of 29; she never remarried.

== Early life ==
Princess Zita of Bourbon-Parma was born at the Villa Pianore in the Italian Province of Lucca, 9 May 1892. The unusual name Zita was given to her after Zita, a popular Italian saint who had lived in Tuscany in the 13th century. She was the third daughter and fifth child of the deposed Robert I, Duke of Parma, and his second wife, Infanta Maria Antonia of Portugal, a daughter of King Miguel of Portugal and his wife Adelaide of Löwenstein-Wertheim-Rosenberg. Zita's father had lost his throne as a result of the movement for Italian unification in 1859 when he was still a child. He fathered twelve children during his first marriage to Princess Maria Pia of the Two Sicilies (six of whom were mentally disabled, and three of whom died young). Duke Robert became a widower in 1882, and two years later he married Infanta Maria Antonia of Portugal. The second marriage produced a further twelve children. Zita was the 17th among Duke Robert's 24 children. Robert moved his large family between Villa Pianore (a large property located between Pietrasanta and Viareggio) and his Schwarzau Castle in Lower Austria. It was mainly in these two residences that Zita spent her formative years. The family spent most of the year in Austria, moving to Pianore in the winter and returning in the summer. To move between them, they took a special train with sixteen coaches to accommodate the family and their belongings.

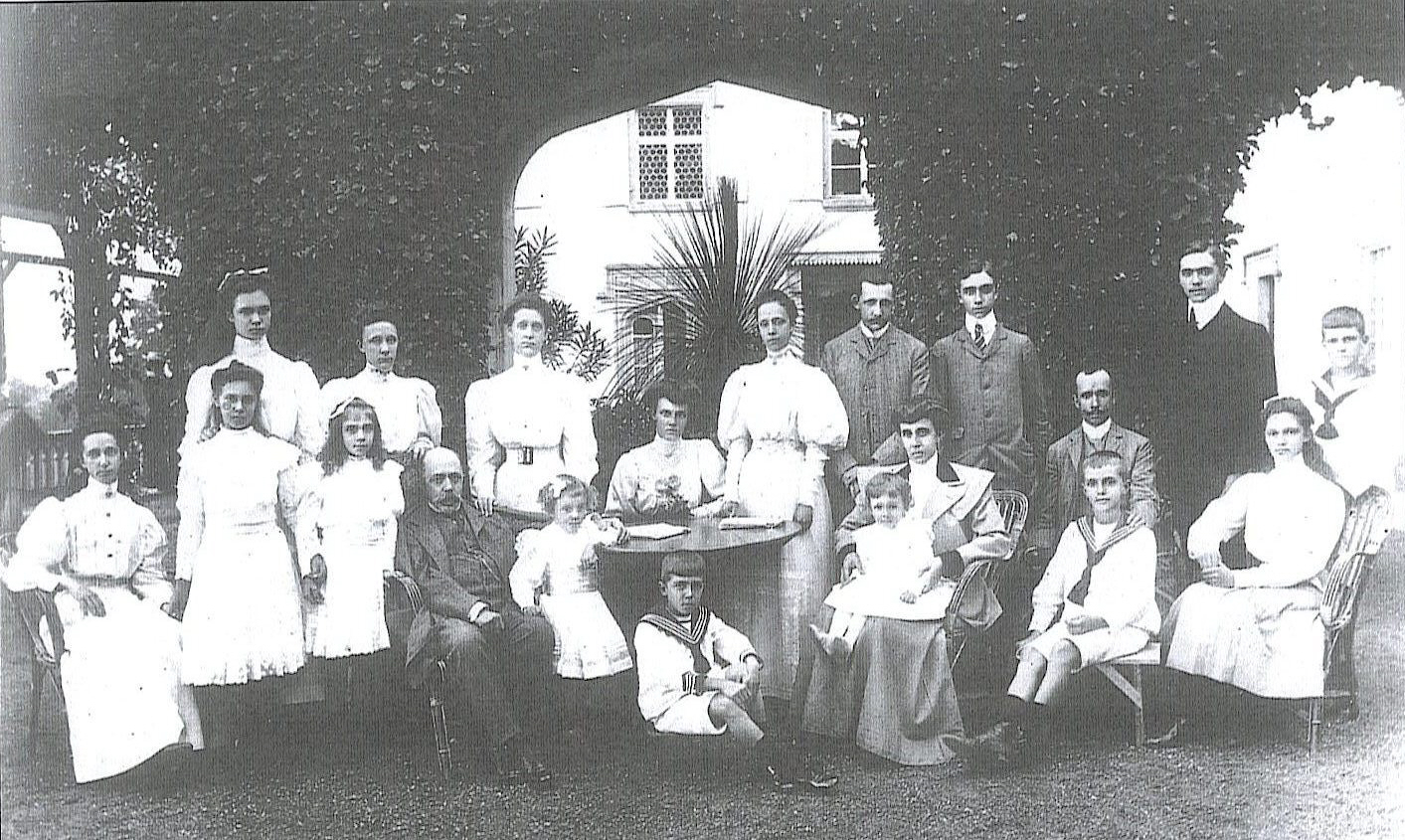
The family of Robert I, Duke of Parma. From left to right, first row: Immacolata, Antonia, Isabella, Duke Robert, Henrietta, Luigi, Gaetano, Duchess Maria Antonia, Renato, Zita (sitting on the far right). From left to right, second row: Francesca, Pia, Luisa, Adelaide, Teresa, Joseph, Xavier, Henry, Sixtus, Felix. Villa Pianore, 1906.

Zita and her siblings were raised to speak Italian, French, German, Spanish, Portuguese and English. She recalled:

We grew up internationally. My father thought of himself first and foremost as a Frenchman, and spent a few weeks every year with the elder children at Chambord, his main property on the Loire. I once asked him how we should describe ourselves. He replied, "We are French princes who reigned in Italy." In fact, of the twenty-four children only three including me, were actually born in Italy.

At the age of ten, Zita was sent to a boarding school at Zanberg in Upper Bavaria, where there was a strict regime of study and religious instruction. She was summoned home in the autumn of 1907 at the death of her father. Her maternal grandmother sent Zita and her sister Francesca to a convent on the Isle of Wight to complete their education. Brought up as devout Catholics, the Parma children regularly undertook good works for the poor. In Schwarzau the family turned surplus cloth into clothes. Zita and Francesca personally distributed food, clothing, and medicines to the needy in Pianore. Three of Zita's sisters became nuns and, for a time, she considered following the same path. Zita went through a period of poor health and was sent for the traditional cure at a European spa for two years.

== Marriage ==
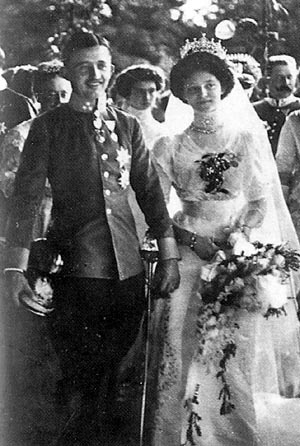
The wedding of Zita and Charles, 21 October 1911

In the close vicinity of Schwarzau castle was the Villa Wartholz, residence of Archduchess Maria Theresa of Austria, Zita's maternal aunt. She was the stepmother of Archduke Otto, who died in 1906, and the step-grandmother of Archduke Charles of Austria-Este, at that time second-in-line to the Austrian throne. The two daughters of Archduchess Maria Theresa were Zita's first cousins and Charles' half-aunts. They had met as children but did not see one another for almost ten years, as each pursued their education. In 1909, his Dragoon regiment was stationed at Brandýs nad Labem, from where he visited his aunt at Františkovy Lázně. It was during one of these visits that Charles and Zita became reacquainted. Charles was under pressure to marry (Franz Ferdinand, his uncle and first-in-line, had married morganatically, and his children were excluded from the throne) and Zita had a suitably royal genealogy. Zita later recalled:

We were of course glad to meet again and became close friends. On my side feelings developed gradually over the next two years. He seemed to have made his mind up much more quickly, however, and became even more keen when, in the autumn of 1910, rumours spread about that I had got engaged to a distant Spanish relative, Don Jaime, the Duke of Madrid. On hearing this, the Archduke came down post haste from his regiment at Brandýs and sought out his grandmother, Archduchess Maria Theresa, who was also my aunt and the natural confidante in such matters. He asked if the rumor was true and when told it was not, he replied, "Well, I had better hurry in any case or she will get engaged to someone else."

Archduke Charles traveled to Villa Pianore and asked for Zita's hand and, on 13 June 1911, their engagement was announced at the Austrian court. Zita in later years recalled that after her engagement she had expressed to Charles her worries about the fate of the Austrian Empire and the challenges of the monarchy. Charles and Zita were married at the Schwarzau castle on 21 October 1911. Charles's great-uncle, the 81-year-old Emperor Franz Joseph I, attended the wedding. He was relieved to see an heir make a suitable marriage, and was in good spirits, even leading the toast at the wedding breakfast. Archduchess Zita soon conceived a son, and Otto was born on 20 November 1912. Seven more children followed in the next decade.

== Wife of the heir to Austrian throne ==
At this time, Archduke Charles was in his twenties and did not expect to become emperor for some time, especially while Franz Ferdinand remained in good health. This changed on 28 June 1914 when the heir and his wife Sophie were assassinated in Sarajevo by Bosnian Serb nationalists. Charles and Zita received the news by telegram that day. She said of her husband, "Though it was a beautiful day, I saw his face go white in the sun."

In the war that followed, Charles was promoted to General in the Austro-Hungarian army, taking command of the 20th Corps for an offensive in Tyrol. The war was personally difficult for Zita, as several of her brothers fought on opposing sides in the conflict (Prince Felix and Prince René had joined the Austrian army, while Prince Sixtus and Prince Xavier lived in France before the war and enlisted in the Belgian army.) Also her country of birth, Italy, joined the war against Austria in 1915, and so rumours of the 'Italian' Zita began to be muttered. Even as late as 1917, the German ambassador in Vienna, Count Botho von Wedel-Jarlsberg, would write to Berlin saying "The Empress is descended from an Italian princely house... People do not entirely trust the Italian and her brood of relatives."

At Franz Joseph's request, Zita and her children left their residence at Schloss Hetzendorf and moved into a suite of rooms at Schönbrunn Palace. Here, Zita spent many hours with the old Emperor on both formal and informal occasions, where Franz Joseph confided in her his fears for the future. Emperor Franz Joseph died of bronchitis and pneumonia at the age of 86 on 21 November 1916. "I remember the dear plump figure of Prince Lobkowitz going up to my husband," Zita later recounted, "and, with tears in his eyes, making the sign of the cross on Charles's forehead. As he did so he said, 'May God bless Your Majesty.' It was the first time we had heard the Imperial title used to us."

== Empress and queen ==
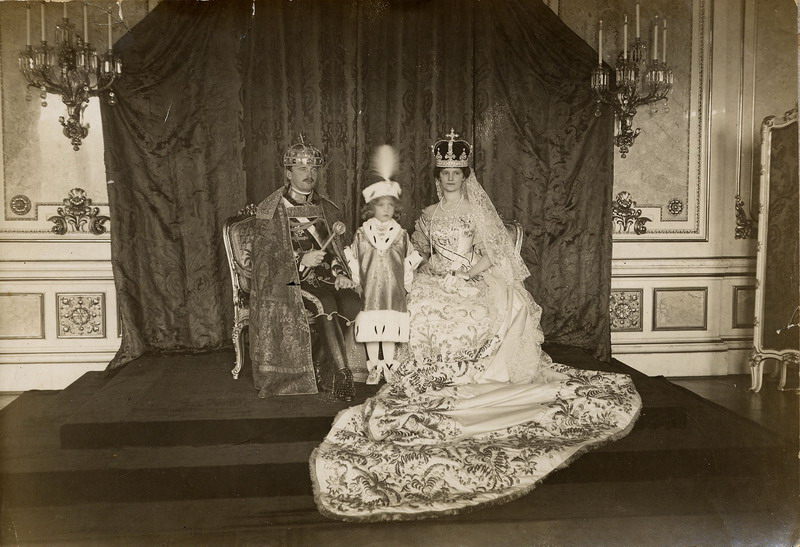
King Charles IV of Hungary, with Queen Zita and Crown Prince Otto. Photograph on the occasion of their coronation. Budapest, 1916.

Charles and Zita were crowned in Budapest on 30 December 1916. Following the coronation there was a banquet, but after that the festivities ended, as the emperor and empress thought it wrong to have prolonged celebrations during a time of war. At the beginning of the reign, Charles was more often than not away from Vienna, so he had a telephone line installed from Baden (where Charles's military headquarters were located) to the Hofburg. He called Zita several times a day whenever they were separated. Zita had some influence on her husband and would discreetly attend audiences with the Prime Minister or military briefings, and she had a special interest in social policy. However, military matters were the sole domain of Charles. Energetic and strong-willed, Zita accompanied her husband to the provinces and to the front, as well as occupying herself with charitable works and hospital visits to the war-wounded.

=== Sixtus affair ===
By the spring of 1917, the War was dragging on towards its fourth year, and Zita's brother Prince Sixtus of Bourbon-Parma, a serving officer in the Belgian Army, was a main mover behind a plan for Austria-Hungary to make a separate peace with France. Charles initiated contact with Sixtus through contacts in neutral Switzerland, and Zita wrote a letter inviting him to Vienna. Zita's mother, Maria Antonia, delivered the letter in person.

Sixtus arrived with conditions for talks which had been agreed with the French – the restoration to France of Alsace-Lorraine (annexed by Germany after the Franco-Prussian War in 1870); restoration of the independence of Belgium; independence for the kingdom of Serbia; and the handover of Constantinople to Russia. Charles agreed, in principle, to the first three points and wrote a letter to Sixtus dated 25 March 1917 which sent "the secret and unofficial message" to the President of France that "I will use all means and all my personal influence". This attempt at dynastic diplomacy eventually foundered. Germany refused to negotiate over Alsace-Lorraine, and, seeing a Russian collapse on the horizon, was loath to give up the war. Sixtus continued his efforts, even meeting David Lloyd George in London about Italy's territorial demands on Austria in the 1915 Treaty of London, but the Prime Minister could not persuade his generals that Britain should make peace with Austria. Zita managed a personal achievement during this time by stopping the German plans to send airplanes to bomb the home of the King and Queen of Belgium on their name days.

In April 1918, after the German-Russian Treaty of Brest-Litovsk, Austrian Foreign Minister Count Ottokar Czernin made a speech attacking incoming French Prime Minister Georges Clemenceau as being the main obstacle to a peace favouring the Central Powers. Clemenceau was incensed and, after seeing Emperor Charles's letter of 24 March 1917, had it published. For a while, the life of Sixtus appeared to be in danger, and there were even fears that Germany might occupy Austria. Czernin persuaded Charles to send a 'Word of Honour' to Austria's allies saying that Sixtus had not been authorised to show the letter to the French Government, that Belgium had not been mentioned, and that Clemenceau had lied about the mention of Alsace. Czernin had actually been in contact with the German Embassy throughout the whole crisis and attempted to persuade the Emperor to step down because of the Affair. After failing to do so, Czernin resigned as Foreign Minister.

=== End of Empire ===
By this time, the war was closing in on the embattled Emperor. A Union of Czech Deputies had already sworn an oath to a new Czechoslovak state independent of the Habsburg Empire on 13 April 1918; the prestige of the German Army had taken a severe blow at the Battle of Amiens; and, on 25 September 1918, Zita's brother-in-law King Ferdinand I of Bulgaria broke away from his allies in the Central Powers and sued for peace independently. Zita was with Charles when he received the telegram announcing Bulgaria's collapse. She remembered it "made it even more urgent to start peace talks with the Western Powers while there was still something to talk about." On 16 October, the Emperor issued a "People's Manifesto" proposing the empire be restructured on federal lines with each nationality gaining its own state. Instead, each nation broke away and the empire effectively dissolved.

Leaving behind their children at Gödöllő, Charles and Zita travelled to the Schönbrunn Palace. By this time ministers had been appointed by the new state of "German-Austria", and by 11 November, together with the Emperor's spokesmen, they prepared a manifesto for Charles to sign. Zita, at first glance, mistook it for an abdication and made her famous statement:

A sovereign can never abdicate. He can be deposed... All right. That is force. But abdicate – never, never, never! I would rather fall here at your side. Then there would be Otto. And even if all of us here were killed, there would still be other Habsburgs!

Charles gave his permission for the document to be published, and he, his family and the remnants of his Court departed for the Royal shooting lodge at Eckartsau, close to the borders with Hungary and Slovakia. The Republic of German-Austria was proclaimed the next day.

== Exile ==
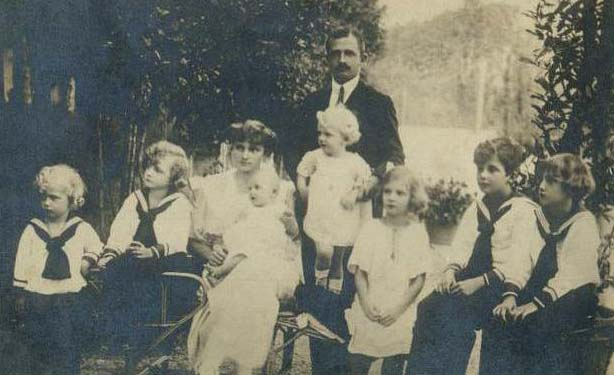
Charles and Zita with their children in exile at Herstenstein, Switzerland, 1921

After a difficult few months at Eckartsau, the Imperial Family received aid from an unexpected source. Prince Sixtus had met King George V and appealed to him to help the Habsburgs. George was reportedly moved by the request, it being only months since his imperial relatives in Russia had been executed by revolutionaries, and promised "We will immediately do what is necessary."

Several British Army officers were sent to help Charles, most notably Lieutenant-Colonel Edward Lisle Strutt, who was a grandson of Lord Belper and a former student at the University of Innsbruck. On 19 March 1919, orders were received from the War Office to "get the Emperor out of Austria without delay". With some difficulty, Strutt managed to arrange a train to Switzerland, enabling the Emperor to leave the country with dignity without having to abdicate. Charles, Zita, their children and their household left Eckartsau on 24 March escorted by a detachment of British soldiers from the Honourable Artillery Company under the command of Strutt.

=== Hungary and exile in Madeira ===
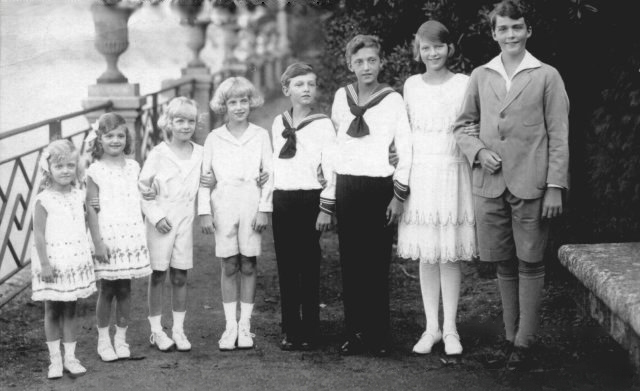
The children in Lequeitio, 1920s

The family's first home in exile was Wartegg Castle in Rorschach, Switzerland, a property owned by the Bourbon-Parmas. However, the Swiss authorities, worried about the implications of the Habsburgs living near the Austrian border, compelled them to move to the western part of the country. The next month, the Habsburgs moved to Villa Prangins, near Lake Geneva, where they resumed a quiet family life. This abruptly ended in March 1920 when, after a period of instability in Hungary, Miklós Horthy was elected regent. Charles was still technically King (as Charles IV) but Horthy sent an emissary to Prangins advising him not to go to Hungary until the situation had calmed. After the Trianon Treaty Horthy's ambition soon grew. Charles became concerned and requested the help of Colonel Strutt to get him into Hungary. Charles twice attempted to regain control, once in March 1921 and again in October 1921. Both attempts failed, despite Zita's staunch support (she insisted on travelling with him on the final dramatic train journey to Budapest).

Charles and Zita temporarily resided at Tata Castle, the home of Count Esterházy, until a suitable permanent exile could be found. Malta was mooted as a possibility, but was declined by Lord Curzon, and French territory was ruled out given the possibility of Zita's brothers intriguing on Charles's behalf. Eventually, the Portuguese island of Madeira was chosen. On 31 October 1921, the former Imperial couple were taken by rail from Tihany to Baja, where the Royal Navy monitor HMS Glowworm was waiting. They finally arrived at Funchal on 19 November. Their children were being looked after at Wartegg Castle in Switzerland by Charles's step-grandmother Maria Theresa, although Zita managed to see them in Zürich when her son Robert needed an operation for appendicitis. The children joined their parents in Madeira in February 1922.

=== Death of Charles ===
Charles had been in poor health for some time. After going shopping on a chilly day in Funchal to buy toys for Carl Ludwig, he was struck by an attack of bronchitis. This rapidly worsened into pneumonia, not helped by the inadequate medical care available. Several of the children and staff were also ill, and Zita (at the time eight months pregnant) helped nurse them all. Charles weakened and died on 1 April, his last words to his wife being "I love you so much." Charles was 34 years old. After his funeral, a witness said of Zita "This woman really is to be admired. She did not, for one second, lose her composure... she greeted the people on all sides and then spoke to those who had helped out with the funeral. They were all under her charm." Zita wore mourning black in Charles's memory throughout 67 years of widowhood.

== Widowhood ==
The family in Belgium, standing in back: Felix, Adelheid, Rudolf and Elisabeth. Seated in front: Carl Ludwig, Otto, Charlotte, Empress Zita and Robert

After Charles's death, the former Austrian imperial family were soon to move again. Alfonso XIII of Spain had approached the British Foreign Office via his ambassador in London, and they agreed to allow Zita and her seven (soon to be eight) children to relocate to Spain. Alfonso duly sent the warship Infanta Isabel to Funchal and this took them to Cádiz. They were then escorted to the Pardo Palace in Madrid, where shortly after her arrival Zita gave birth to Archduchess Elisabeth. Alfonso XIII offered his exiled Habsburg relatives the use of Palacio Uribarren at Lekeitio on the Bay of Biscay. This appealed to Zita, who did not want to be a heavy burden to the state that harboured her. For the next six years Zita settled in Lekeitio, where she got on with the job of raising and educating her children. They lived with straitened finances, mainly living on income from private property in Austria, income from a vineyard in Johannisberg in the Rhine Valley, and voluntary collections. Other members of the exiled Habsburg dynasty, however, claimed much of this money, and there were regular petitions for help from former Imperial officials.

=== Move to Belgium ===
By 1929, several of the children were approaching the age to attend university and the family moved to a castle in the Belgian village of Steenokkerzeel near Brussels, where they were closer to several members of their family. Zita continued her political lobbying on behalf of the Habsburg family, even sounding out links with Mussolini's Italy. There was even a possibility of a Habsburg restoration under the Austrian Chancellors Engelbert Dollfuss and Kurt Schuschnigg, with Crown Prince Otto visiting Austria numerous times. These overtures were abruptly ended by the annexation of Austria by Nazi Germany in 1938. As exiles, the Habsburg family took the lead in resisting the Nazis in Austria, but this foundered because of opposition between monarchists and socialists.

=== Flight to North America ===
With the Nazi invasion of Belgium on 10 May 1940, Zita and her family became war refugees. They narrowly missed being killed by a direct hit on the castle by German bombers and fled to Prince Xavier's castle at Bostz in France. The Habsburgs then fled to the Spanish border, reaching it on 18 May. On 12 June, the Portuguese ruler António Salazar issued instructions to the Portuguese consulates in France to provide Infanta Maria Antónia of Portugal, Duchess of Parma, with Portuguese passports. With these Portuguese passports the family could get visas without creating problems for the neutrality of the Portuguese Government. This way the daughter of Maria Antónia, Zita of Bourbon-Parma, and her son Otto von Habsburg got their visas because they were descendants of a Portuguese citizen. They moved on to Portugal and resided in Cascais. Not long after, the archduke was informed by Salazar that Hitler had demanded his extradition. The demand would be refused, the Portuguese ruler told him, but hinted that his safety was precarious. On 9 July the United States government granted the family visas. After a perilous journey they arrived in New York City on 27 July, having family on Long Island and Newark, New Jersey; at one point, Zita and several of her children lived, as long-term house-guests, in Tuxedo Park, New York.

The Austrian imperial refugees eventually settled in Quebec, which had the advantage of being French-speaking (the younger children were not yet fluent in English) and continued their studies in French at Université Laval. As they were cut off from all European funds, finances were more stretched than ever. At one stage, Zita was reduced to making salad and spinach dishes from dandelion leaves. However, all her sons were active in the war effort. Otto promoted the dynasty's role in a post-war Europe and met regularly with Franklin Roosevelt; Robert was the Habsburg representative in London; Carl Ludwig and Felix joined the United States Army, serving with several American-raised relatives of the Mauerer line; Rudolf smuggled himself into Austria in the final days of the war to help organise the resistance. In 1945 Empress Zita celebrated her birthday on the first day of peace, 9 May. She was to spend the next two years touring the United States and Canada to raise funds for war-ravaged Austria and Hungary.

== Later life ==
Empress Zita of Austria with her eight children. Standing in the back from left to right Archdukes Carl Ludwig, Rudolf and Robert, in the middle Archduchesses Adelheid, Elisabeth and Charlotte with Archduke Felix, in the forefront Empress Zita and Archduke Otto, 1962

After a period of rest and recovery, Zita found herself regularly going back to Europe for the weddings of her children. She decided to move back to the continent full-time in 1952 to Luxembourg to look after her aging mother. Maria Antonia died at the age of 96 in 1959. The bishop of Chur proposed to Zita that she move into a residence that he administered (formerly a castle of the Counts de Salis) at Zizers, Graubünden in Switzerland. As the castle had enough space for visits from her large family and a nearby chapel (a necessity for the devoutly-Catholic Zita), she accepted with ease.

Zita occupied herself in her final years with her family. Although the restrictions on the Habsburgs entering Austria had been lifted, that applied only to those born after 10 April 1919. That meant that Zita could not attend the funeral of her daughter Adelheid in 1971, which was painful for her. She also involved herself in the efforts to have her deceased husband, the "Peace Emperor" canonised. In 1982, the restrictions were eased, and she returned to Austria after being absent for six decades. Over the next few years, the Empress made several visits to her former Austrian homeland and even appeared on Austrian television. In a series of interviews with the Viennese tabloid newspaper Kronen Zeitung, Zita expressed her belief that the deaths of Crown Prince Rudolf of Austria and his mistress Baroness Mary Vetsera, at Mayerling, in 1889, were not a double suicide but rather murder by French or Austrian agents.

=== Death ===
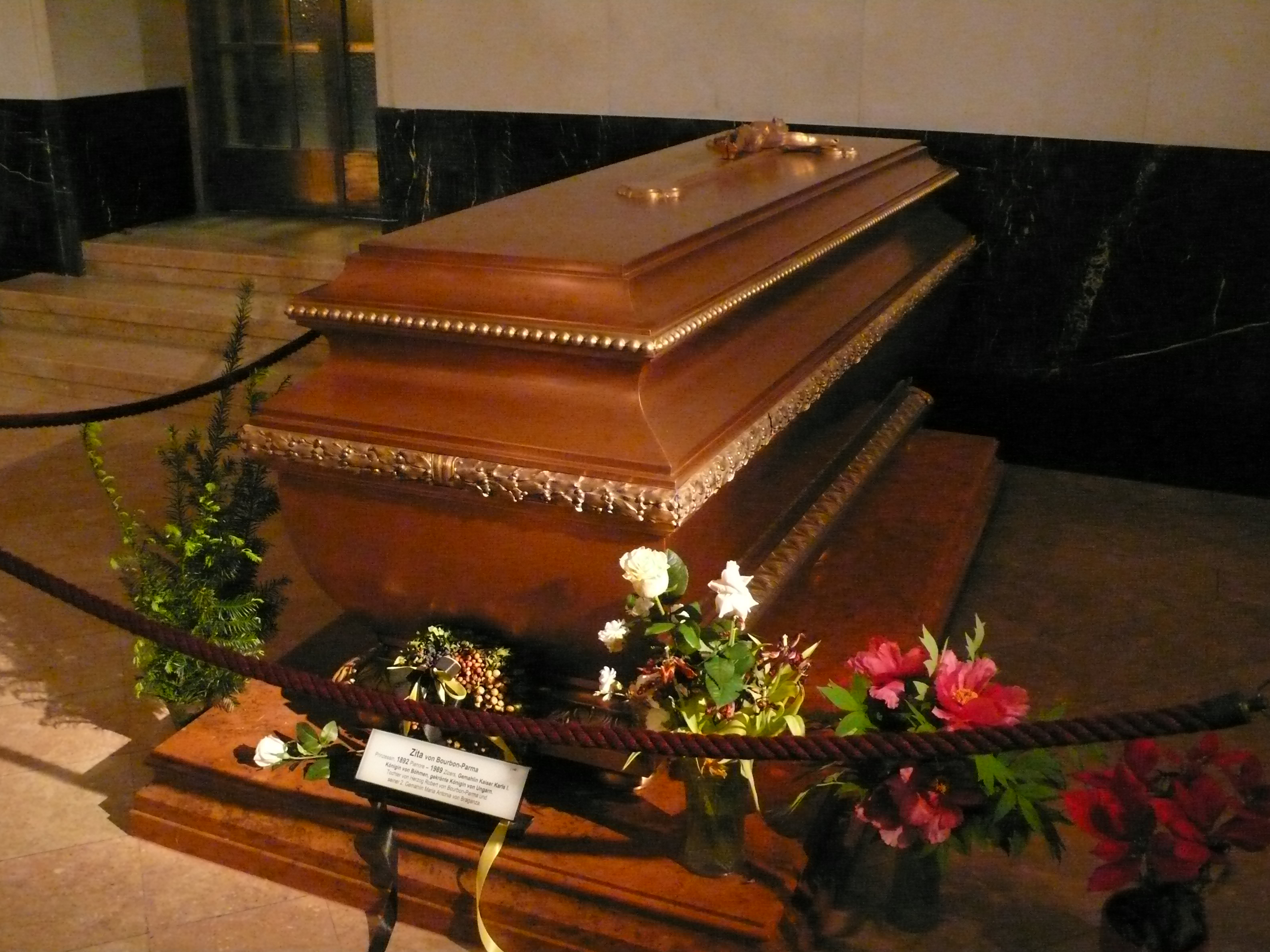
The tomb of Empress Zita at the Imperial Crypt, Vienna

After a memorable 90th birthday, at which she was surrounded by her now vast family, Zita's habitually-robust health began to fail. She developed inoperable cataracts in both eyes. Her last major family gathering took place at Zizers, in 1987, when her children and grandchildren joined in celebrating her 95th birthday. While visiting her daughter, in summer 1988, she developed pneumonia and spent most of the autumn and winter bedridden. Finally, she called Otto in early March 1989 and told him she was dying. He and the rest of the family travelled to her bedside and took turns keeping her company until she died in the early hours of 14 March 1989. She was 96 years old, and was the last surviving child of Robert, Duke of Parma from both his marriages.

Her funeral was held in Vienna on 1 April. The government allowed it to take place on Austrian soil if the cost was borne by the Habsburgs themselves. Zita's body was carried to the Imperial Crypt under Capuchin Church in the same funeral coach she had walked behind during the funeral of Emperor Franz Joseph in 1916. It was attended by over 200 members of the Habsburg and Bourbon-Parma families, and the service had 6,000 attendees including leading politicians, state officials and international representatives, including a representative of Pope John Paul II. Following an ancient custom, the Empress had asked that her heart, which was placed in an urn, stay behind at Muri Abbey, in Switzerland, where the Emperor's heart had rested for decades. In doing so, Zita assured herself that in death, she and her husband would remain by each other's side.

When the procession of mourners arrived at the gates of the Imperial Crypt, the herald who knocked on the door during the traditional "admission ceremony" introduced her as Zita, Her Majesty the Empress and Queen.

== Cause of beatification and canonization ==
Servant of God Zita of Austria-Hungary
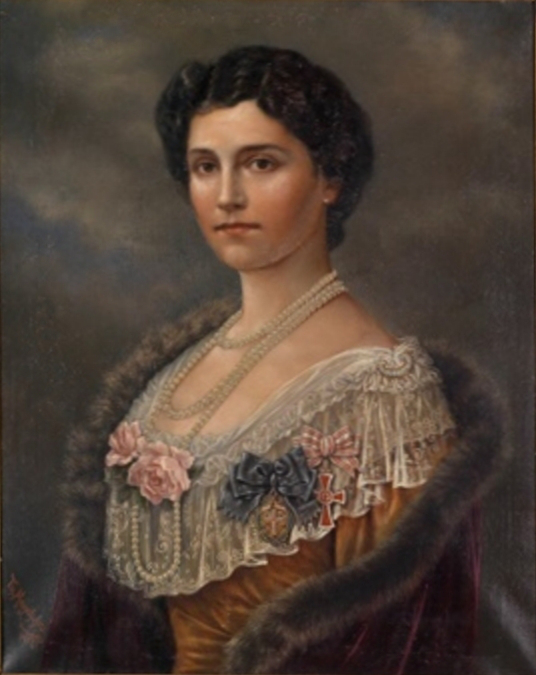
- Empress Zita of Austria painted by Theodor Mayerhofer, circa 1917.
- Venerated in: Catholic Church
- Feast: 21 October

On 10 December 2009, Mgr Yves Le Saux, Bishop of Le Mans, France, opened the diocesan process for the beatification of Zita. Zita was in the habit of spending several months each year in the diocese of Le Mans at St. Cecilia's Abbey, Solesmes, where three of her sisters were nuns.

The actor is the French Association pour la Béatification de l'Impératrice Zita. The postulator for the cause is Alexander Leonhardt. Vice postulator for Hungary is Catholic theologian Norbert Nagy. The judge of the tribunal is Bruno Bonnet. The promoter of justice is François Scrive.

With the opening of her cause, the late Empress has been named Servant of God.

== Titles, styles, honours and arms ==
Styles of Zita, Empress of Austria & Queen of Hungary
- Reference style: Her Imperial and Royal Apostolic Majesty
- Spoken style: Your Imperial and Royal Apostolic Majesty

=== Titles and styles ===
- 9 May 1892 – 21 October 1911: Her Royal Highness Princess Zita of Parma
- 21 October 1911 – 28 June 1914: Her Imperial and Royal Highness Archduchess Zita, Archduchess Karl of Austria, Princess of Parma
- 28 June 1914 – 21 November 1916: Her Imperial and Royal Highness The Archduchess of Austria-Este
- 21 November 1916 – 3 April 1919: Her Imperial and Royal Apostolic Majesty The Empress of Austria, Apostolic Queen of Hungary and Croatia, Slavonia and Dalmatia

=== Honours ===
- (Austria-Hungary) House of Habsburg:
  - Grand Mistress Dame of the Order of the Starry Cross
  - Dame Grand Cross of the Order of Elisabeth, 1913
  - Knight Grand Officer of the Order of the Red Cross, with War Decoration
- Sovereign Military Order of Malta: Dame Grand Cross of Honour and Devotion of the Order of Saint John

== Children ==
Charles and Zita had eight children and thirty three grandchildren:

Name	Birth	Death	Notes
Crown Prince Otto	20 November 1912	4 July 2011	married (1951) Princess Regina of Saxe-Meiningen (6 January 1925 – 3 February 2010) and had seven children, twenty-two grandchildren and ten great-grandchildren.
Archduchess Adelheid	3 January 1914	2 October 1971	never married, no issue
Archduke Robert	8 February 1915	7 February 1996	married (1953) Princess Margherita of Savoy-Aosta (7 April 1930 - 10 January 2022) and had five children, nineteen grandchildren and three great-grandchildren.
Archduke Felix	31 May 1916	6 September 2011	married (1952) Princess Anna Eugenie von Arenberg (5 July 1925 - 9 June 1997) and had seven children and twenty-two grandchildren.
Archduke Carl Ludwig	10 March 1918	11 December 2007	married (1950) Princess Yolanda of Ligne (6 May 1923 – 13 September 2023) and had four children, nineteen grandchildren and ten great-grandchildren.
Archduke Rudolf	5 September 1919	15 May 2010	married (1953) Countess Xenia Tschernyschev-Besobrasoff (11 June 1929 - 20 September 1968) and had four children, thirteen grandchildren and three great-grandchildren. Married (secondly) (1971) Princess Anna Gabriele of Wrede (born 11 September 1940) and had one daughter and three grandsons.
Archduchess Charlotte	1 March 1921	23 July 1989	married (1956) Duke Georg of Mecklenburg (5 October [O.S. 23 September] 1899 – 6 July 1963).
Archduchess Elisabeth	31 May 1922	6 January 1993	married (1949) Prince Heinrich of Liechtenstein (5 August 1916 – 17 April 1991) and had five children, seven grandchildren and six great-grandchildren.

== Ancestry ==
Ancestors of Zita of Bourbon-Parma

8. Charles II, Duke of Parma
4. Charles III, Duke of Parma
9. Princess Maria Teresa of Savoy
2. Robert I, Duke of Parma
10. Prince Charles Ferdinand, Duke of Berry
5. Princess Louise of Artois
11. Princess Marie Caroline of Naples and Sicily
1. Zita of Bourbon-Parma
12. John VI of Portugal and Brazil
6. Miguel I of Portugal
13. Infanta Carlota Joaquina of Spain
3. Infanta Maria Antonia of Portugal
14. Constantine, Hereditary Prince of Löwenstein
7. Princess Adelaide of Löwenstein
15. Princess Agnes of Hohenlohe-Langenburg

== See also ==
- Florentine Diamond, once owed by Zita of Bourbon-Parma

== Bibliography ==
- Bogle, James and Joanna. (1990). A Heart for Europe: The Lives of Emperor Charles and Empress Zita of Austria-Hungary, Fowler Wright, 1990, ISBN 0-85244-173-8
- Brook-Shepherd, Gordon. (1991). The Last Empress: The Life and Times of Zita of Austria-Hungary 1893–1989. Harper-Collins. ISBN 0-00-215861-2
- Harding, Bertita. (1939). Imperial Twilight: The Story of Karl and Zita of Hungary. Bobbs-Merrill Company Publishers. ASIN: B000J0DDQO
- (in German) Bernhard A. Macek: Kaiser Karl I. Der letzte Kaiser Österreichs. Ein biografischer Bilderbogen, Sutton Verlag, Erfurt 2012, ISBN 978-3-9540-0076-0
- (in French) Debris, Cyrille. (2013). Zita, Portrait intime d'une imperatrice. Cerf, Paris, 2013, ISBN 978-2-204-10085-4

Zita of Bourbon-Parma House of Bourbon-Parma Cadet branch of the House of Bourbon Born: 9 May 1892 Died: 14 March 1989
Austro-Hungarian royalty
Vacant Title last held by Elisabeth in Bavaria	Empress consort of Austria; Queen consort of Bohemia; Queen consort of Galicia and Lodomeria; Queen consort of Hungary; Queen consort of Croatia, Slavonia and Dalmatia; 1916–1918	Monarchy abolished
Titles in pretence
Monarchy abolished	— TITULAR — Empress consort of Austria; Queen consort of Bohemia; Queen consort of Galicia and Lodomeria; Queen consort of Hungary; Queen consort of Croatia, Slavonia and Dalmatia; 1918–1922	Vacant Title next held by Princess Regina of Saxe-Meiningen
