= Archduchess Adelheid of Austria =

Archduchess of Austria (1914–1971)

Archduchess Adelheid
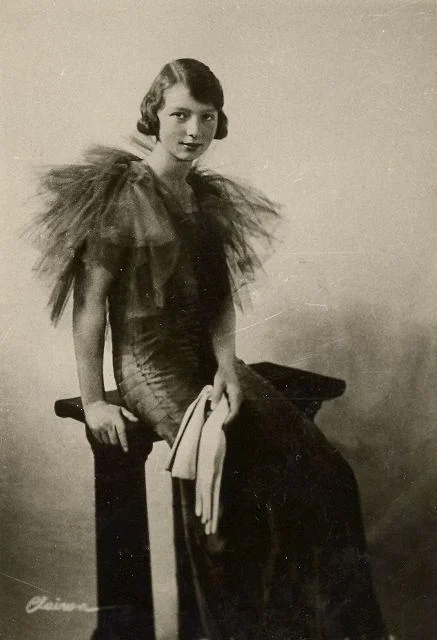
- Born: 3 January 1914; Schloss Hetzendorf Palace, Vienna, Austria-Hungary
- Died: 2 October 1971 (aged 57); Pöcking, Bavaria, West Germany
Names
- Adelheid Maria Josepha Sixta Antonia Roberta Ottonia Zita Charlotte Luise Immakulata Pia Theresia Beatrix Franziska Isabella Henriette Maximiliana Genoveva Ignatia Marcus d'Aviano Habsburg-Lothringen
- House: Habsburg-Lorraine
- Father: Charles I of Austria
- Mother: Empress Zita of Austria

Archduchess Adelheid of Austria (Adelheid Maria Josepha Sixta Antonia Roberta Ottonia Zita Charlotte Luise Immakulata Pia Theresia Beatrix Franziska Isabella Henriette Maximiliana Genoveva Ignatia Marcus d'Aviano; 3 January 1914 – 2 October 1971) was an archduchess of Austria, as the daughter of Emperor Charles I of Austria and Empress Zita.

== Biography ==
=== Early years ===
Archduchess Adelheid was born on 3 January 1914, in the Schloss Hetzendorf. She was the second child and eldest daughter of Archduke Charles of Austria and his wife, Zita of Bourbon-Parma. On 7 January 1914, she was baptised by Friedrich Gustav Piffl, Archbishop of Vienna. Her godparents that stood for her were her paternal grandmother, Princess Maria Josepha of Saxony, and her mother's brother Prince Sixtus of Bourbon-Parma.

On 21 November 1916, Adelheid's great-granduncle, Emperor Franz Joseph, died and her father succeeded him as emperor of Austria and king of Hungary. During World War I Adelheid would often accompany her brother, Crown Prince Otto, and father on trips to inspect the Austrian troops.

Following the Austro-Hungarian Empire's defeat in the war, her father was forced to renounce participation in state affairs and subsequently the empire was dismantled—and republics were established in Austria and Hungary. In 1919, Adelheid and her family were sent into exile, first at Wartegg Castle in Switzerland and lastly on the Island of Madeira.

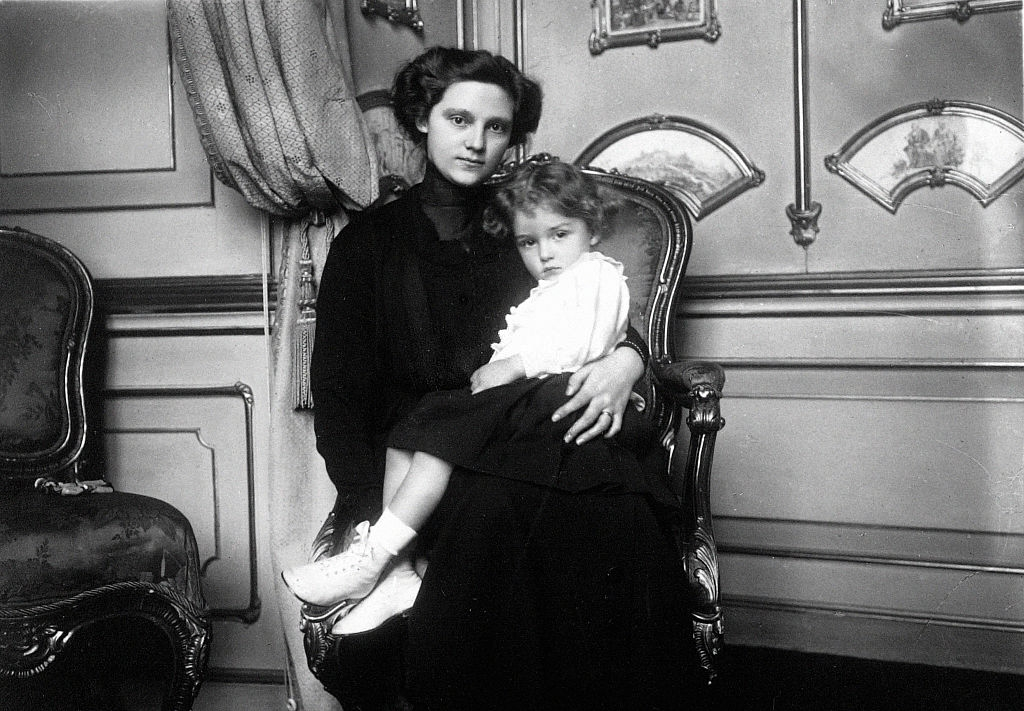
Archduchess Adelheid and her mother Zita, late 1910s

On 9 March 1922, Adelheid was with her brother Otto and father when he went into town to buy toys for Carl Ludwig's birthday. On the way back, they were enveloped by chill mists; due to this, her father caught a cold that later developed into pneumonia, from which he died on 1 April.

=== Later life ===
In December 1933 she became the first member of her family to set foot in Vienna since the establishment of the republic, when she arrived by train from Budapest. Adelheid attended the University of Louvain and gained a doctorate in 1938. During World War II she emigrated with most of her family to the United States to escape the Nazis; she would later return to Europe.

On 2 October 1971, Adelheid died in Pöcking, Bavaria, aged 57. She never married and did not have children.

== Ancestry ==
Ancestors of Archduchess Adelheid of Austria

8. Archduke Karl Ludwig of Austria
4. Archduke Otto Franz of Austria
9. Princess Maria Annunziata of Bourbon-Two Sicilies
2. Charles I of Austria
10. George of Saxony
5. Princess Maria Josepha of Saxony
11. Infanta Maria Ana of Portugal
1. Archduchess Adelheid of Austria
12. Charles III, Duke of Parma
6. Robert I, Duke of Parma
13. Princess Louise of Artois
3. Princess Zita of Bourbon-Parma
14. Miguel I of Portugal
7. Infanta Maria Antónia of Portugal
15. Princess Adelaide of Löwenstein
