= Lucy Alexa Heathcote Currie =

Lucy Alexa Heathcote Currie (28 January 1868 – 19 December 1957) was a medical-missionary midwife and nurse as well as an education missionary. She was an influential figure in the missionary healthcare community, contributing to midwifery and women's healthcare in India as part of the Church Missionary Society (CMS). Currie served as an example of the combination of healthcare, education, and missionary work during the late 19th and early 20th centuries.

== Early life ==
=== Personal life ===
Lucy Alexa Heathcote Currie was born on January 28, 1868, in Shahjahanpur, Bengal, India, to Robert George Currie and Fanny Catherine Ouseley. She was baptized on April 4, 1868, in the same town. She came from a prominent family: her grandfather, Sir Frederick Currie, served as the Foreign Secretary of State for India's government and as the Governor of Punjab. Her father was an English cricketer.

On January 19, 1895, Currie married Dr. John Orlando Summerhayes, a fellow missionary and physician in India. The couple continued their missionary work in Punjab, raising a family of eight children (two sons and six daughters).

=== Education ===
Currie received her early education in India before pursuing nursing and midwifery training at Princess Helena College in Ealing, London, England.

== Mission work ==
At the age of 25, in 1893, Currie was accepted as an honorary missionary to the Punjab and Sindh Mission of the Church Missionary Society (CMS), stationed at Tarn Taran, India.

Currie's work in Tarn Taran was part of a broader CMS project to provide healthcare and education in remote and underprivileged parts of India. She worked with other missionaries to promote health and Christianity, focusing on empowering women and improving maternal health outcomes.

Currie retired in 1906.

=== Published work ===
Currie L (compiler). Missionary Birthday Book, Religious Tract Society, 1894. A collection of daily scripture, hymns, and missionary history events.

== Death ==
Currie died on December 19, 1957, in Sussex, England, at the age of 89.
