= Charles I of Austria =

Habsburg monarch from 1916 to 1918

Charles I & IV
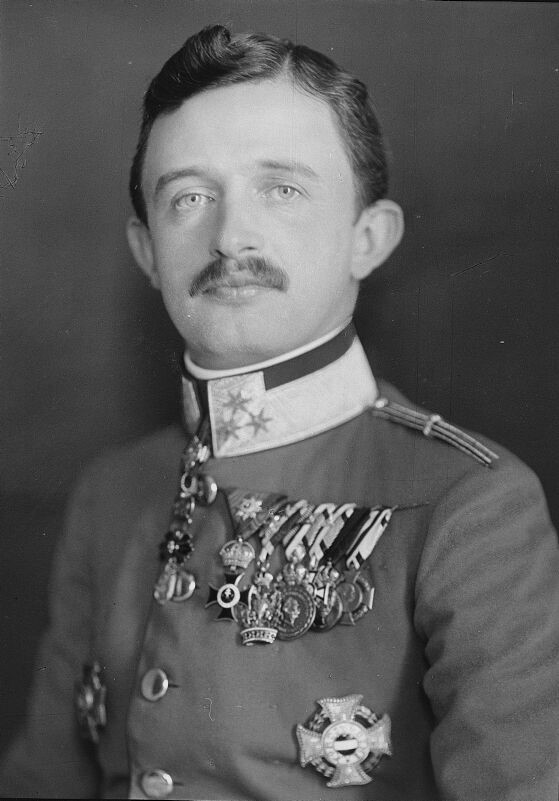
- Formal portrait, 1917

Emperor of Austria
- Reign: 21 November 1916 – 12 November 1918
- Predecessor: Franz Joseph I
- Successor: Monarchy abolished

King of Hungary
- Reign: 21 November 1916 – 16 November 1918
- Coronation: 30 December 1916; Matthias Church, Budapest
- Predecessor: Franz Joseph I
- Successor: Mihály Károlyi (as President of Hungary)

King of Bohemia
- Reign: 21 November 1916-12 November 1918
- Predecessor: Franz Joseph I
- Successor: Monarchy abolished
- Born: 17 August 1887; Persenbeug-Gottsdorf, Austria-Hungary
- Died: 1 April 1922 (aged 34); Funchal, Madeira, Portugal
- Burial: Church of Our Lady of the Mount (body); Muri Abbey (heart)
- Spouse: Zita of Bourbon-Parma (m. 1911)
- Issue: Otto, Crown Prince of Austria; Archduchess Adelheid; Robert, Archduke of Austria-Este; Archduke Felix; Archduke Carl Ludwig; Archduke Rudolf; Archduchess Charlotte, Duchess of Mecklenburg-Strelitz; Archduchess Elisabeth
Names
- Karl Franz Josef Ludwig Hubert Georg Otto Maria
- House: Habsburg-Lorraine
- Father: Archduke Otto Franz Joseph of Austria
- Mother: Princess Maria Josepha of Saxony
- Religion: Catholic Church
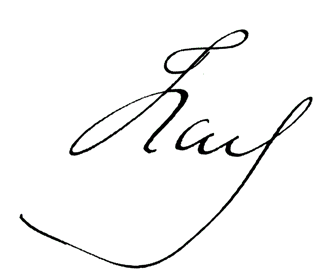
- Signature
- Charles I's voice Charles I on the Austrian Army in World War I Recorded 5 February 1915

Charles I and IV (German: Karl Franz Josef Ludwig Hubert Georg Otto Maria, Hungarian: Károly Ferenc József Lajos Hubert György Ottó Mária; 17 August 1887 – 1 April 1922) was Emperor of Austria (as Charles I), King of Hungary (as Charles IV), and the ruler of the other states of the Habsburg monarchy from November 1916 until the monarchy was abolished in November 1918. He was the last of the monarchs belonging to the House of Habsburg-Lorraine to rule over Austria-Hungary. The son of Archduke Otto of Austria and Princess Maria Josepha of Saxony, Charles became heir presumptive of Emperor Franz Joseph when his uncle Archduke Franz Ferdinand of Austria was assassinated in 1914. In 1911, he married Princess Zita of Bourbon-Parma.

Charles succeeded to the thrones in November 1916 following the death of his grand-uncle, Franz Joseph. He began secret negotiations with the Allies, hoping to peacefully end the First World War, but was unsuccessful. Despite Charles's efforts to preserve the empire by returning it to federalism and by championing Austro-Slavism, Austria-Hungary hurtled into disintegration: Czechoslovakia and the State of Slovenes, Croats and Serbs were proclaimed, and Hungary broke monarchic ties to Austria by the end of October 1918. Following the Armistice of 11 November 1918, Charles "renounced any participation" in government affairs, but did not abdicate. However, the Republic of German-Austria was proclaimed the following day, and in April 1919 the National Assembly formally dethroned the Habsburgs and banished Charles from German-Austria for life.

Charles spent the early part of his exile in Switzerland. He spent the remaining years of his life attempting to restore the monarchy. He made two attempts to reclaim the Hungarian throne in 1921, but failed due to the opposition of Hungary's Calvinist regent, Admiral Miklós Horthy. Charles was exiled for a second time to the Portuguese island of Madeira, where he soon fell ill and died of respiratory failure in 1922. A deeply religious man, Charles was beatified by the Catholic Church in 2004, with October 21 as his feast day.

== Early life ==
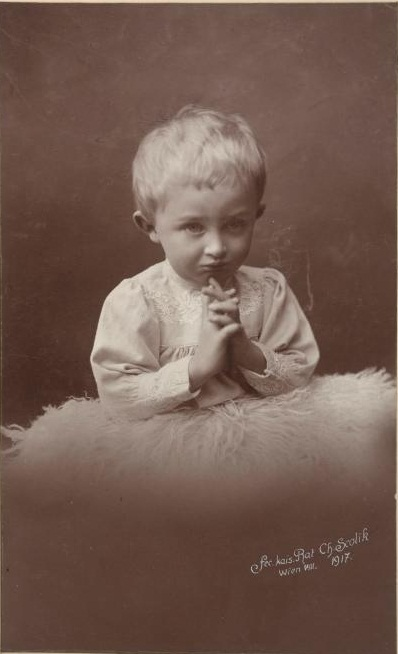
Charles as a child, c. 1889

Charles was born on 17 August 1887, in the Castle of Persenbeug, in Lower Austria. His parents were Archduke Otto Franz of Austria and Princess Maria Josepha of Saxony. At the time, his grand-uncle Franz Joseph reigned as Emperor of Austria and King of Hungary. Upon the death of the Emperor's son Crown Prince Rudolph in 1889, Franz Joseph's brother (Charles' grandfather) Archduke Karl Ludwig became next in line to the Austro-Hungarian throne. However, his death in 1896 from typhoid made his eldest son, Archduke Franz Ferdinand, the new heir presumptive.

Archduke Charles was raised a devout Catholic. He spent his early years wherever his father's regiment happened to be stationed; later on, he lived in Vienna and Reichenau an der Rax. He was privately educated, but, contrary to the custom ruling in the imperial family, he attended a public gymnasium (the Schottengymnasium) for the sake of demonstrations in scientific subjects. On the conclusion of his studies at the gymnasium, he entered the army, spending the years from 1906 to 1908 as an officer chiefly in Prague, where he studied Law and Political Science concurrently with his military duties.

In 1907, he was declared of age, and Prince Zdenko von Lobkowitz was appointed as his chamberlain. During the next few years, he carried out his military duties in various Bohemian garrison towns. Charles's relations with his great-uncle were not intimate, and those with his uncle Franz Ferdinand were not cordial, with the differences between their wives increasing the existing tension between them. For these reasons, Charles, up to the time of the assassination of his uncle in 1914, obtained no insight into affairs of state, but led the life of a prince not destined for a high political position.

== Marriage ==
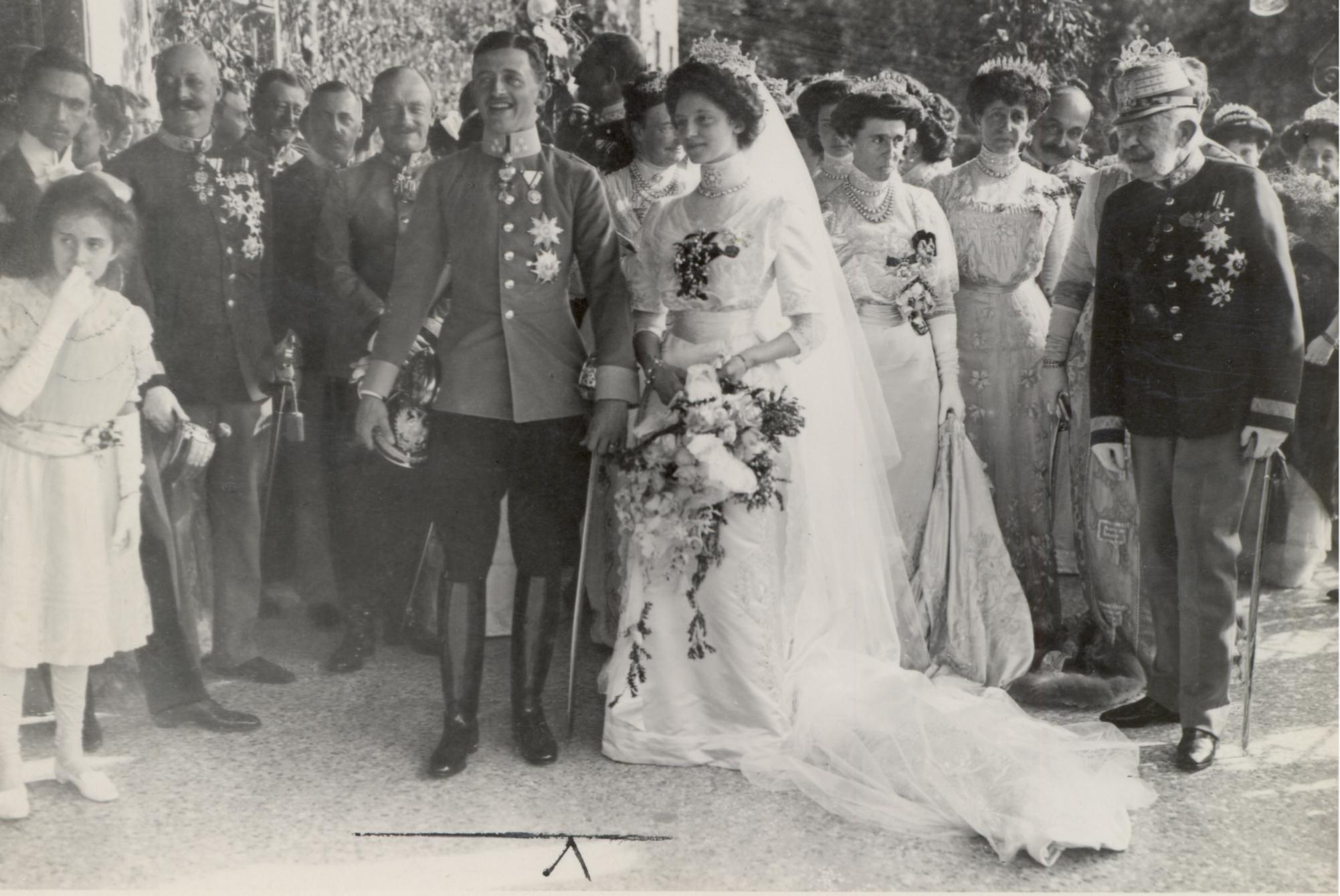
Charles and Zita's wedding, 21 October 1911.

On 21 October 1911, Charles married Princess Zita of Bourbon-Parma. They had met as children but did not see one another for almost ten years, as each pursued their education. In 1909, his dragoon regiment was stationed at Brandýs nad Labem in Bohemia, from where he visited his aunt at Franzensbad.

It was during one of these visits that Charles and Zita became reacquainted. Due to Franz Ferdinand's morganatic marriage in 1900, his children were excluded from the succession. As a result, the Emperor pressured Charles to marry. Zita not only shared Charles's devout Catholicism, but also an impeccable royal lineage. Zita later recalled:

We were of course glad to meet again and became close friends. On my side feelings developed gradually over the next two years. He seemed to have made his mind up much more quickly, however, and became even more keen when, in the autumn of 1910, rumours spread about that I had got engaged to a distant Spanish relative, Jaime, Duke of Madrid. On hearing this, the Archduke came down post haste from his regiment at Brandeis and sought out his [step]grandmother, Archduchess Maria Theresa, who was also my aunt and the natural confidante in such matters. He asked if the rumor was true and when told it was not, he replied, "Well, I had better hurry in any case or she will get engaged to someone else."

Archduke Charles traveled to Villa Pianore, the Italian winter residence of Zita's parents, and asked for her hand; on 13 June 1911, their engagement was announced at the Austrian court. Charles and Zita were married at the Bourbon-Parma castle of Schwarzau in Austria on 21 October 1911. Charles's grand-uncle, the 81-year-old Emperor Franz Joseph, attended the wedding. He was relieved to see the second-in-line to the throne in a suitable marriage, and was in good spirits, even leading the toast at the wedding breakfast. Archduchess Zita soon conceived a son, and Otto was born 20 November 1912. Seven more children followed in the next decade.

== Heir presumptive ==
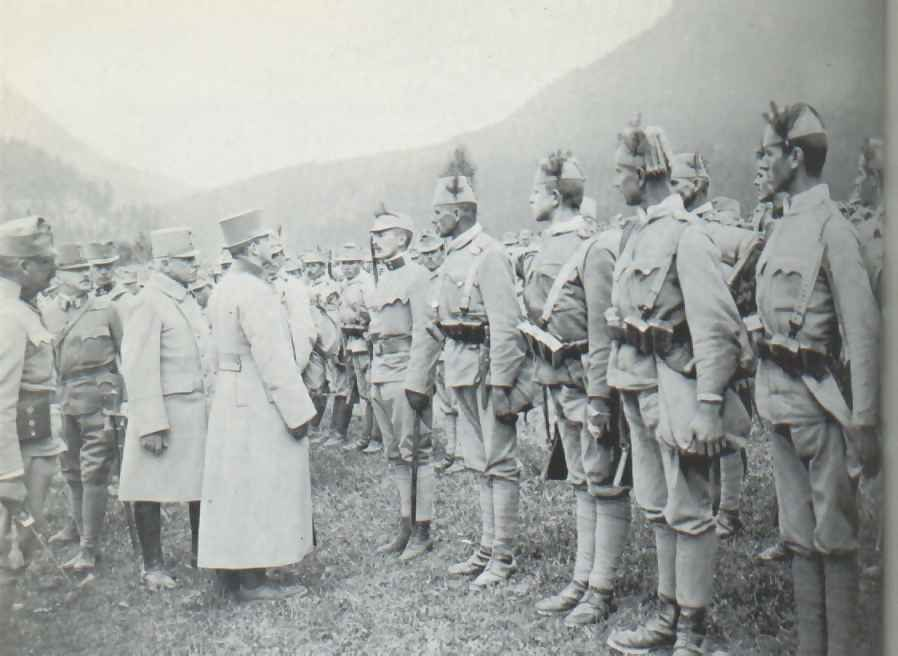
Charles with Bosnian-Herzegovinian Infantry on the Isonzo front in Italy in 1915

Charles, whose father had died in 1906, became heir presumptive after the assassination of Archduke Franz Ferdinand, his uncle, in Sarajevo in 1914, the event which precipitated World War I. The old Emperor took steps to initiate Charles in affairs of state, but the outbreak of World War I interfered with this political education. Charles spent the first phase of the war at headquarters at Teschen, but exercised no military influence.

Charles then became a Feldmarschall (Field Marshal) in the Austro-Hungarian Army. In the spring of 1916, in connection with the offensive against Italy, he was entrusted with the command of the XX. Corps, whose affections he won by his affability and friendliness. The offensive, after a successful start, soon came to a standstill. Shortly afterwards, Charles went to the eastern front as commander of Army Group Archduke Karl operating against the Russians and Romanians.

== Reign ==
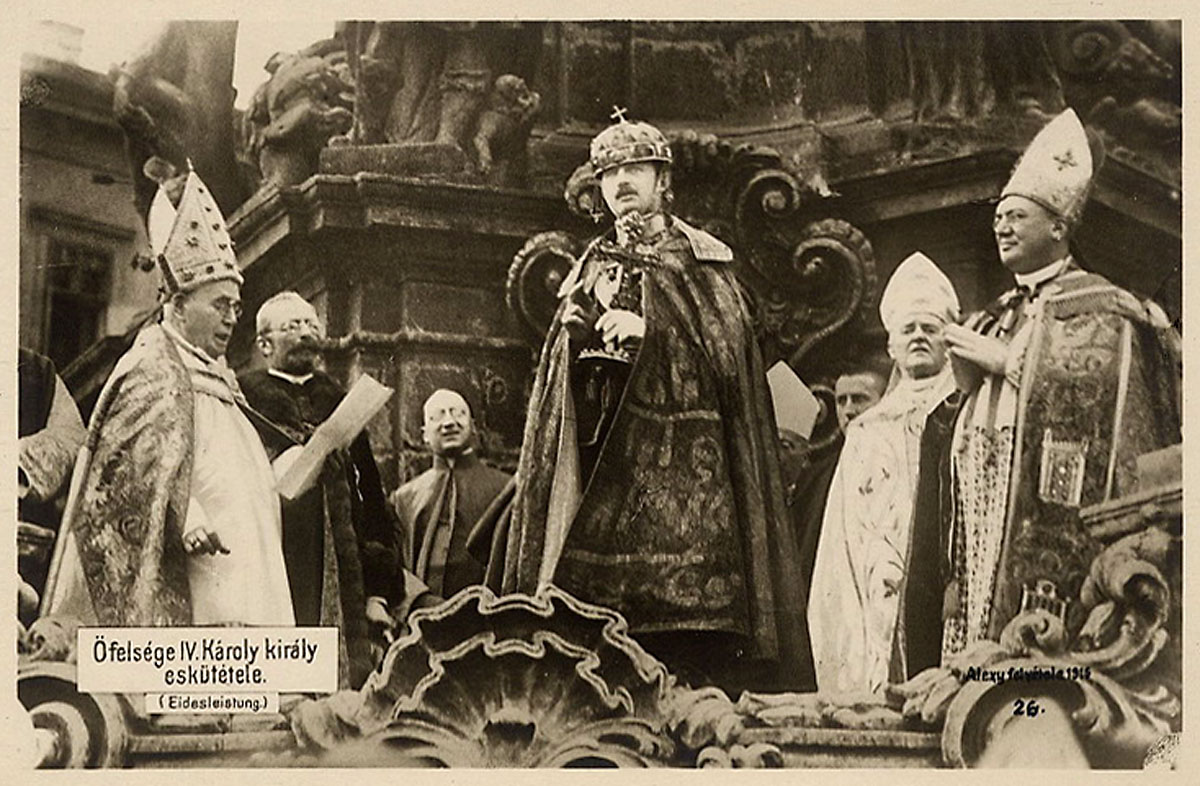
King Charles IV taking his coronation oath at Holy Trinity Column outside Matthias Church, Budapest, 30 December 1916

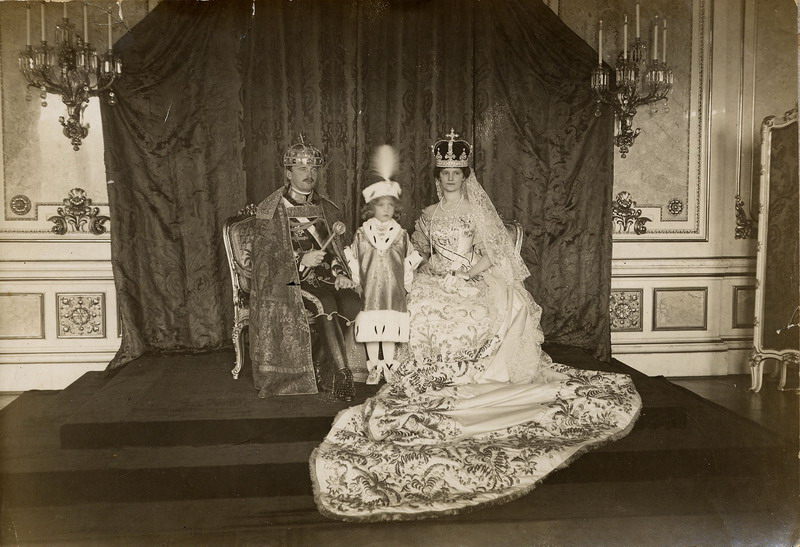
Portrait of the recently crowned King Charles IV of Hungary and Queen Zita with their son Otto

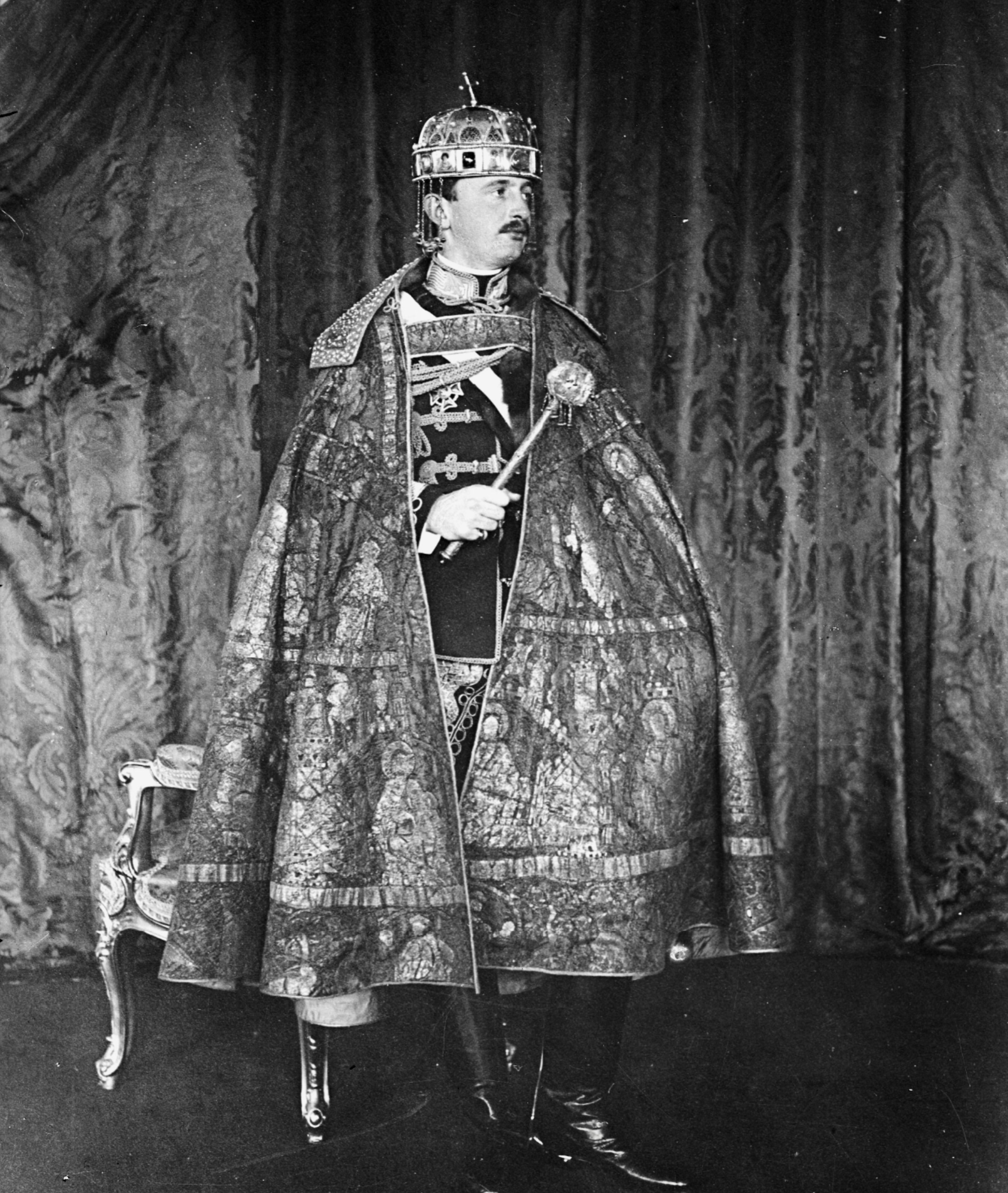
Charles as King of Hungary

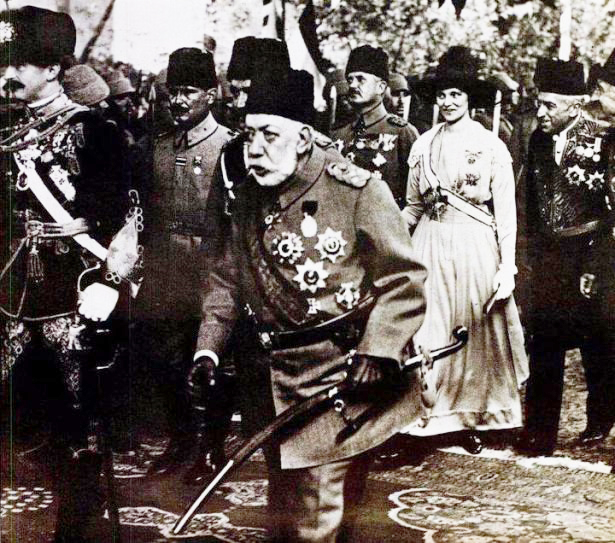
Mehmed V hosting King Charles IV (left) in Constantinople, 1918

Charles succeeded to the thrones on 21 November 1916 upon the death of his grand-uncle, Emperor Franz Joseph. On 2 December 1916, he assumed the title of Supreme Commander of the Austro-Hungarian Army, succeeding Archduke Friedrich. His coronation as King of Hungary occurred on 30 December. In 1917, Charles secretly entered into peace negotiations with France. He employed his brother-in-law, Prince Sixtus of Bourbon-Parma, an officer in the Belgian Army, as intermediary. However, the Allies insisted on Austrian recognition of Italian claims to territory and Charles refused, so no progress was made. Foreign minister Graf Czernin was only interested in negotiating a general peace which would include Germany; Charles himself went much further in suggesting his willingness to make a separate peace. When news of what became known as the Sixtus Affair leaked in April 1918, Charles denied involvement until French Prime Minister Georges Clemenceau published letters signed by him. This led to Czernin's resignation, forcing Austria-Hungary to give Berlin full control of its armed forces, factories, and railways.

The Austro-Hungarian Empire was wracked by inner turmoil in the final years of the war, with escalating tension between ethnic groups. As part of his Fourteen Points, U.S. President Woodrow Wilson demanded that the Empire allow for autonomy and self-determination of its peoples. In response, Charles agreed to reconvene the Imperial Parliament and allow for the creation of a confederation with each national group exercising self-governance. However, the ethnic groups fought for full autonomy as separate nations, as they were now determined to become independent from Vienna at the earliest possible moment.

The new foreign minister Baron Istvan Burián asked for an armistice on 14 October based on the Fourteen Points, and two days later Charles issued a proclamation that radically changed the nature of the Austrian state. The Poles were granted full independence with the purpose of joining their ethnic brethren in Russia and Germany in what was to become the Second Polish Republic. The rest of the Austrian lands were transformed into a federal union composed of four parts: German, Czech, South Slav, and Ukrainian. Each of the four parts was to be governed by a federal council, and Trieste was to have a special status. However, U.S. Secretary of State Robert Lansing replied four days later that the Allies were committed to the political independence of the Czechs, Slovaks and South Slavs, and that autonomy inside the Empire was no longer enough. In fact, a Czechoslovak provisional government had joined the Allies on 14 October, and the South Slav national council declared an independent South Slav state on 29 October 1918.

=== Trialism and Croatia ===
From the beginning of his reign, Charles I favored the creation of a third, Croatian, political entity in the Empire, in addition to Austria and Hungary. In his Croatian coronation oath in 1916, he recognized the union of the Triune Kingdom of Croatia, Dalmatia and Slavonia with Rijeka and during his short reign supported trialist suggestions from the Croatian Sabor and Ban; however, the suggestions were always vetoed by the Hungarian Parliament, which did not want to share power with other nations. After Emperor Charles's People's Manifesto of 14 October 1918 was rejected by the declaration of the National Council in Zagreb, President of the Croatian pro-monarchy political party Pure Party of Rights Dr. Aleksandar Horvat with Ivo Frank and other parliament members and generals went to visit the emperor on 21 October 1918 in Bad Ischl, where the emperor agreed and signed the trialist manifesto under the proposed terms set by the delegation, on the condition that the Hungarian part does the same since he swore an oath on the integrity of the Hungarian crown. The delegation went the next day to Budapest where it presented the manifesto to Hungarian officials and Council of Ministers who signed the manifesto and released the king from his oath, creating a third Croatian political entity (Zvonimir's kingdom). After the signing, two parades were held in Zagreb, one for the ending of the K.u.K. monarchy, which was held in front of the Croatian National Theater, and another one for saving the trialist monarchy. The last vote for the support of the trialist reorganization of the empire was, however, too late. On 29 October 1918, the Croatian Sabor (parliament) ended the union and all ties with Hungary and Austria, proclaimed the unification of all Croatian lands and entered the State of Slovenes, Croats and Serbs.

The Lansing note effectively ended any efforts to keep the Empire together. One by one, the nationalities proclaimed their independence; even before the note the national councils had been acting more like provisional governments. Charles's political future became uncertain. On 31 October, Hungary officially ended the personal union between Austria and Hungary. Nothing remained of Charles's realm except the predominantly German-speaking Danubian and Alpine provinces, and he was challenged even there by the German Austrian State Council. His last Austrian prime minister, Heinrich Lammasch, advised him that he was in an impossible situation, and his best course was to temporarily give up his right to exercise sovereign power.

== Proclamations of November 1918 ==
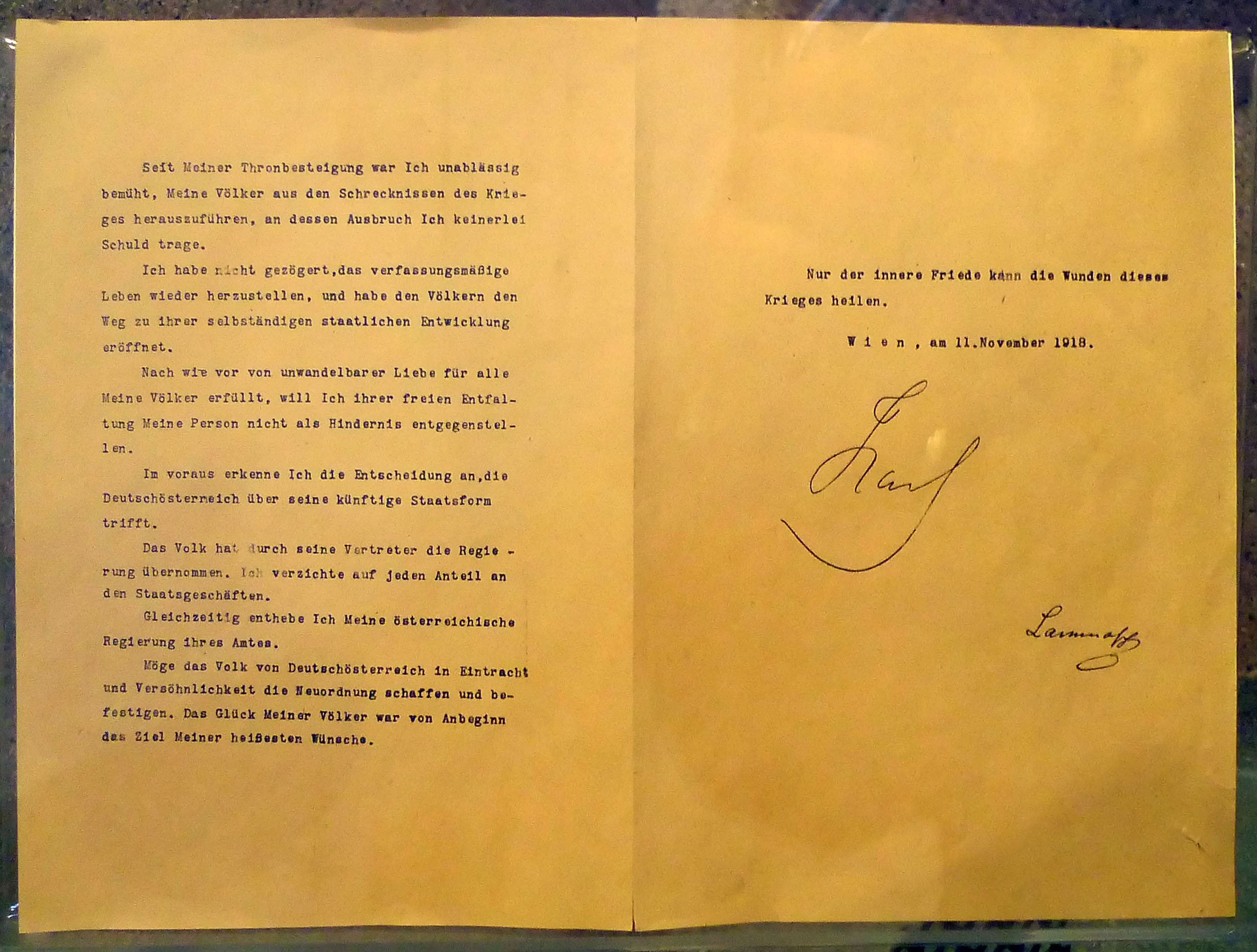
Proclamation of 11 November 1918

On the day of the Armistice of 11 November 1918, Charles issued a carefully worded proclamation in which he recognized the Austrian people's right to determine the form of the state and "relinquish[ed] every participation in the administration of the State." He also released his officials from their oath of loyalty to him. On the same day, the Imperial Family left Schönbrunn Palace and moved to Schloss Eckartsau, east of Vienna. On 13 November, following a visit with Hungarian magnates, Charles issued a similar proclamation—the Eckartsau Proclamation—for Hungary.

Although it has widely been cited as an "abdication", the word itself was never used in either proclamation. Indeed, he deliberately avoided using the word abdication in the hope that the people of either Austria or Hungary would vote to recall him. Privately, Charles left no doubt that he believed himself to be the rightful emperor. He wrote to Friedrich Gustav Cardinal Piffl, the Archbishop of Vienna:

I did not abdicate, and never will [...] I see my manifesto of 11 November as the equivalent to a cheque which a street thug has forced me to issue at gunpoint [...] I do not feel bound by it in any way whatsoever."

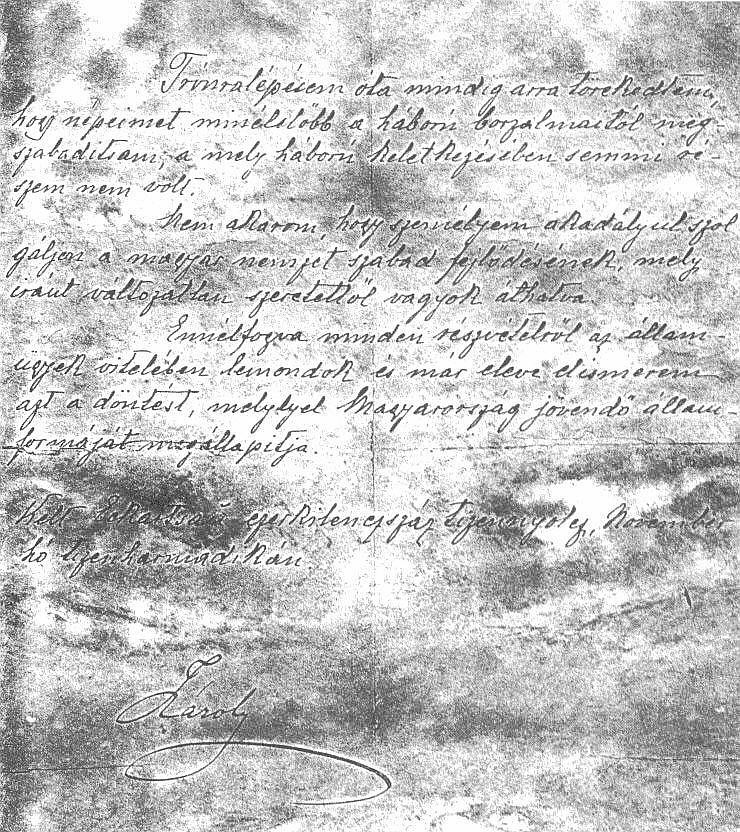
Proclamation of 13 November 1918

Instead, on 12 November, the day after he issued his proclamation, the independent Republic of German-Austria was proclaimed, followed by the proclamation of the First Hungarian Republic on 16 November. An uneasy truce-like situation ensued and persisted until 23 to 24 March 1919, when Charles left for Switzerland, escorted by the commander of the small British guard detachment at Eckartsau, Lieutenant Colonel Edward Lisle Strutt.

As the imperial train left Austria on 24 March, Charles issued another proclamation in which he confirmed his claim of sovereignty, declaring that:

[W]hatever the national assembly of German Austria has resolved with respect to these matters since 11 November is null and void for me and my House.

The newly established republican government of Austria was not aware of this "Manifesto of Feldkirch" at this time—it had been dispatched only to King Alfonso XIII of Spain and to Pope Benedict XV through diplomatic channels—and politicians in power were irritated by the Emperor's departure without explicit abdication.

The Austrian Parliament responded on 3 April with the Habsburg Law, which dethroned and banished the Habsburgs. Charles was barred from ever returning to Austria. Other male Habsburgs could only return if they renounced all intentions of reclaiming the defunct throne and accepted the status of ordinary citizens. Another law passed on the same day abolished all nobility in Austria. In Switzerland, Charles and his family briefly took residence at Wartegg Castle, near Rorschach at Lake Constance, and later moved to Château de Prangins at Lake Geneva on 20 May.

== Attempts to reclaim throne of Hungary ==
Following the restoration of the Kingdom of Hungary, encouraged by Hungarian royalists ("legitimists"), Charles sought twice in 1921 to reclaim the throne of Hungary, but failed largely because Hungary's regent, Admiral Miklós Horthy (the last commander of the Imperial and Royal Navy), refused to support Charles's restoration. Horthy's action was declared "treasonous" by royalists. Critics suggest that Horthy's actions were more firmly grounded in political reality than those of Charles and his supporters. Indeed, neighbouring countries had threatened to invade Hungary if Charles tried to regain the throne. Princess Zita however, claimed that Charles had come to a verbal agreement with the French prime minister and foreign minister Aristide Briand (who had supported Charles' peace efforts in 1917) regarding a Habsburg restoration in Hungary, which meant it would receive French recognition and military backing if successful. In the event of the attempt failing, Briand would deny all involvement, which he indeed did during both attempts. Later in 1921, the Hungarian parliament formally nullified the Pragmatic Sanction, an act that effectively dethroned the Habsburgs in Hungary.

== Exile in Madeira, Portugal, and death ==
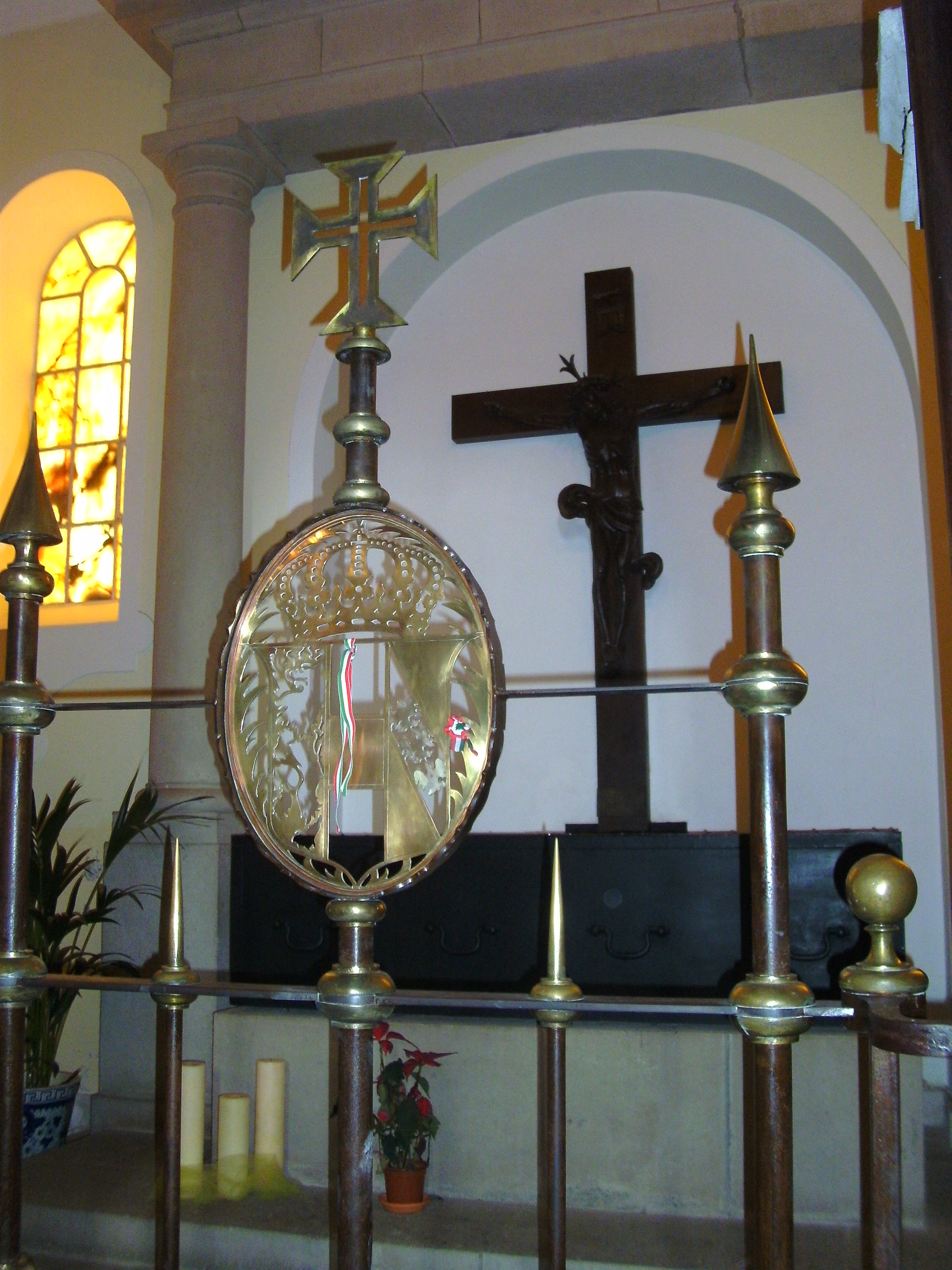
Tomb of Charles I in Madeira

After the second failed attempt at restoration in Hungary, Charles and his pregnant wife Zita were arrested by the Hungarian authorities and imprisoned in Tihany Abbey. On 1 November 1921 they were transported down the Danube aboard the gunboat HMS Glowworm and across the Black Sea on the cruiser HMS Cardiff.

Charles received a military escort into exile by order of King George V of the United Kingdom. They were provided escorts into exile because socialist regimes were taking over Vienna, Austria, after WWI, and there was fear of a potential assassination. The first military escort was Sir Thomas Montgomery-Cuninghame, 10th Baronet. He was followed by John Orlando Summerhayes in Ekartsau. Summerhayes was assigned to his role after leading prisoners-of-war out of Germany and Austria. Emperor Charles I wrote a letter to King George thanking him for sending Colonel Summerhayes for his protection. He wrote that Summerhayes was charming and fulfills his duty as a virtuous and clever man. Furthermore, Summerhayes' cheerful character was able to brighten the mood of the royal family during their stay in Eckartsau, providing emotional and medical support. Summerhayes was replaced by Edward Lisle Strutt, another British Army Colonel, as protector to emperor. It has been said that the emperor developed a particularly close relationship with Strutt and looked upon him with favor.

Summerhayes was later sent to accompany Archduke Felix, the fourth child of Charles I, to Switzerland to monitor his health.

On 19 November 1921 Charles and his wife arrived at their final exile, the isolated, heavily guarded Portuguese island of Madeira.

The couple and their children, who joined them on 2 February 1922, lived first at Funchal at the Villa Vittoria, next to Reid's Hotel, and later moved to a modest residence in Quinta do Monte.

Charles never left Madeira. On 9 March 1922 he caught a cold in town, which developed into bronchitis and progressed to severe pneumonia. Having suffered two heart attacks, he died of respiratory failure on 1 April, in the presence of his wife (who was pregnant with their eighth child) and nine-year-old former Crown Prince Otto, remaining conscious almost until his last moments. His last words to his wife were "I love you so much." He was 34 years old. His remains except for his heart are still on the island, resting in state in a chapel devoted to the Emperor in the Portuguese Church of Our Lady of the Mount, in spite of several attempts to move them to the Habsburg Crypt in Vienna. His heart and the heart of his wife are entombed in Muri Abbey, Switzerland.

== Legacy ==
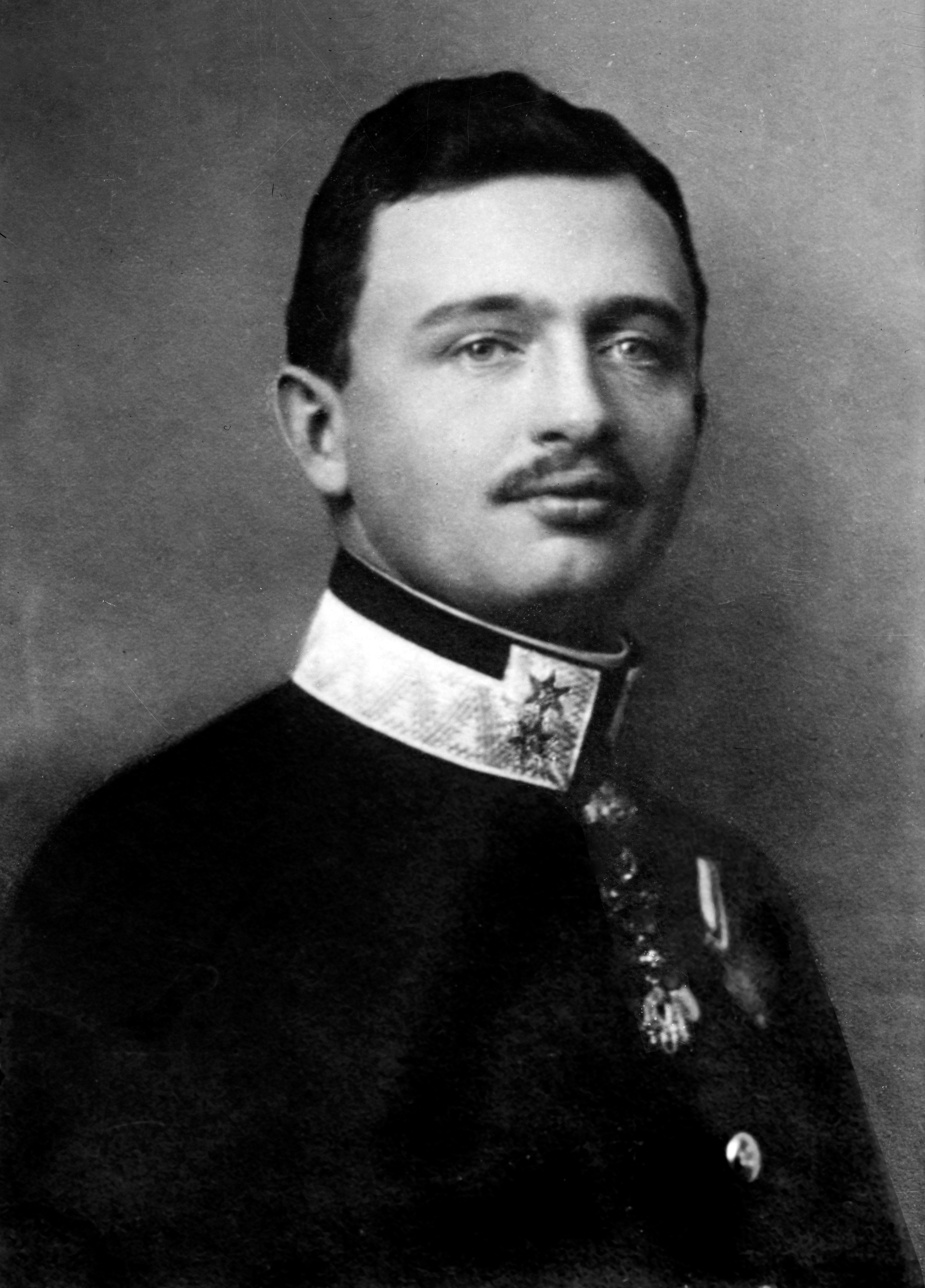
Charles as Archduke

Historians have been mixed in their evaluations of Charles and his reign. In the interwar period, he was celebrated in Austria as a military hero. When Nazi Germany took over it made his memory into that of a traitor. For decades after 1945, both popular and academic interest practically disappeared, but attention has slowly returned.

Helmut Rumpler, the head of the Habsburg commission of the Austrian Academy of Sciences, described Charles as "a dilettante, far too weak for the challenges facing him, out of his depth, and not really a politician." Others have seen Charles as a brave and honourable figure who tried to stop the war in which his Empire was drowning. Anatole France, the French novelist, stated:

This war without end is criminal. What is abominable is that they do not want to end it. No, they do not want. Do not try to tell me that there was no way to end it. Emperor Charles offered peace; he is the only decent man to have appeared in this war, and he was not listened to. There was, through him, a chance that could have been seized... Clemenceau called the emperor a "rotten conscience", it's ignoble. Emperor Charles sincerely wanted peace, and therefore was despised by the whole world. [...] A king of France, yes a king, would have had pity on our poor, exhausted, blood-soaked nation. However democracy is without a heart and without entrails. When serving the powers of money, it is pitiless and inhuman.

Paul von Hindenburg, the German commander in chief, commented in his memoirs 1920:

He tried to compensate for the evaporation of the ethical power which Emperor Franz Joseph had represented by offering völkisch reconciliation. Even as he dealt with elements who were sworn to the goal of destroying his empire he believed that his acts of political grace would affect their conscience. These attempts were totally futile; those people had long ago lined up with our common enemies, and were far from being deterred.

== Beatification ==
Blessed Karl of Austria
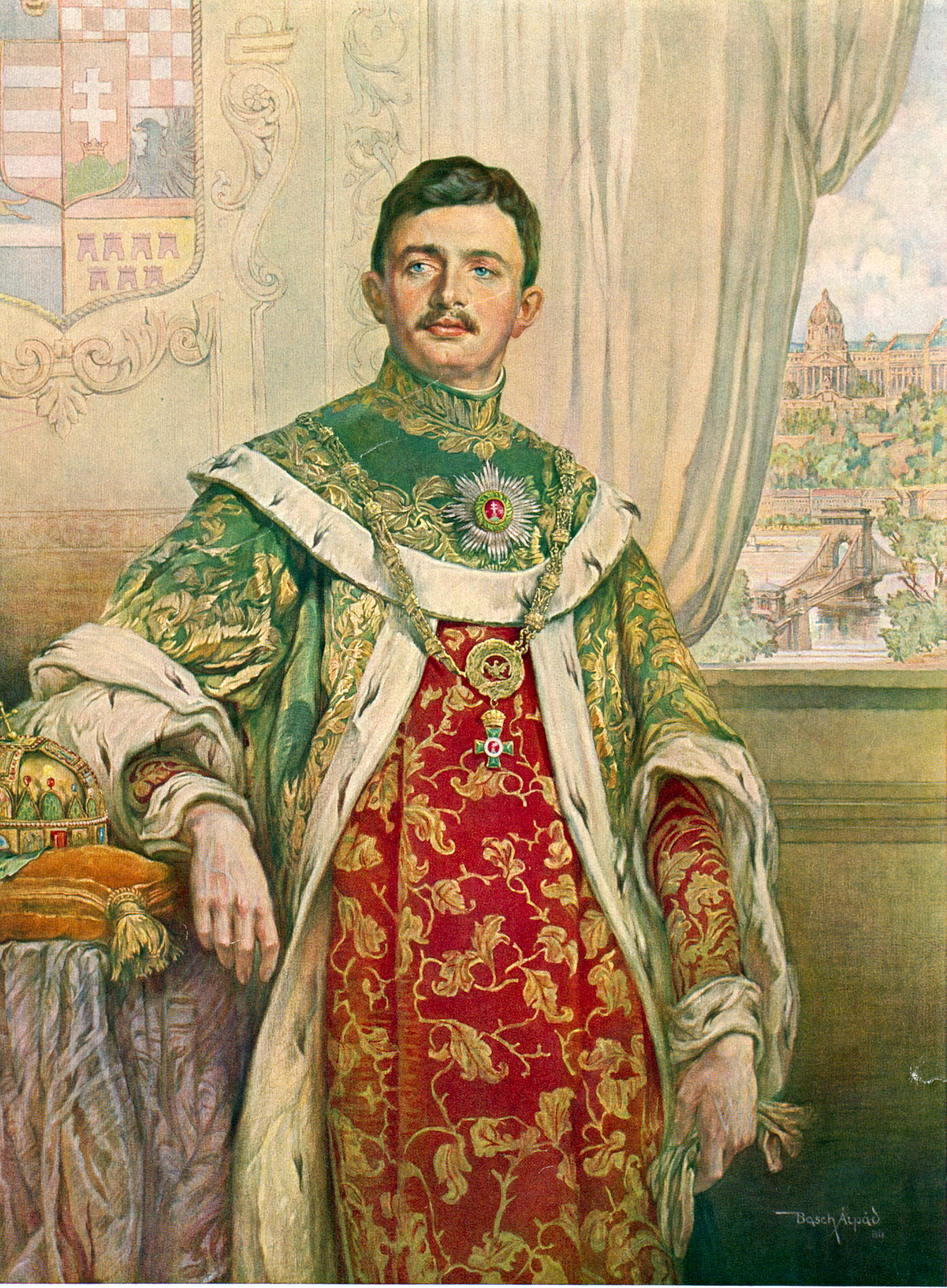
- Charles I of Austria with the habit of the Order of Saint Stephen of Hungary

Emperor and Confessor
- Venerated in: Catholic Church
- Beatified: 3 October 2004, Saint Peter's Square, Vatican City by Pope John Paul II
- Major shrine: Church of Our Lady of Monte, Funchal, Portugal
- Feast: 21 October
- Attributes: Imperial attire; Medals
- Patronage: World peace

Catholic Church leaders have praised Charles for putting his Christian faith first in making political decisions, and for his role as a peacemaker during the war, especially after 1917.

The cause or campaign for his canonization began in Vienna in 1949. On 25 April 1951, the cause was transferred to Rome, and Charles was declared "servant of God", the first step in the process. At the beginning of the cause for canonization in 1972 his tomb was opened and his body was discovered to be incorrupt.

On 14 April 2003, the Vatican's Congregation for the Causes of Saints, in the presence of Pope John Paul II, promulgated Charles of Austria's "heroic virtues". Charles thereby acquired the title "venerable". On 21 December 2003, the Congregation certified, on the basis of three expert medical opinions, that a miracle in 1960 occurred through the intercession of Charles. The miracle attributed to Charles was the scientifically inexplicable healing of the Polish-born Brazilian Sister Maria Zita Gradowska of the Daughters of Charity of St. Vincent de Paul. Sister Maria Zita had suffered from pains in her legs since her youth, and later on would suffer from problems with her venous circulation and swellings, for which she was repeatedly treated over the years, but her health issues would not go away for good. In 1957 she became the Mother Superior of Santa Cruz Hospital in Canoinhas, but the pains in her right leg also gradually became worse. By the end of 1960 she was unable to leave her bed. Despite wanting to resign her position as Mother Superior because of this, she was unable to, as there was an insufficient number of sisters.

Around this time, another sister, who was an assistant of Sister Maria Zita, received printed leaflets about the life of Emperor Karl, which included prayers for his beatification. Naturally, Sister Maria Zita was also informed, however, as she did not care much for the Habsburg dynasty, she did not do anything with this information. She told the other sisters that her bedridden state and the coming absence of another sister worried her, and she was again advised to ask for the intercession of the Emperor, but she did not plan on doing so. That evening however, when lying in bed, she was unable to sleep because of the excruciating pain in her right leg. It is then that she decided to say a prayer of intercession and promised to start the next day with a novena to beg for the grace of beatification for the Servant of God. After praying, she did not feel the pain anymore and was able to easily fall asleep. From then on she was able to resume her duties as Mother Superior and would not suffer from any health problems with her legs for the rest of her life.

Pope John Paul II declared Charles "Blessed" in a beatification ceremony in St. Peter's Square on 3 October 2004. The Pope also declared 21 October, the date of Charles's marriage in 1911 to Princess Zita, to be Charles's feast day. At the ceremony, the Pope stated:

The decisive task of Christians consists in seeking, recognizing and following God's will in all things. The Christian statesman, Charles of Austria, confronted this challenge every day. To his eyes, war appeared as "something appalling". Amid the tumult of the First World War, he strove to promote the peace initiative of my Predecessor, Benedict XV.

The main points of Pope Benedict XV's peace plan were: (1) the moral force of right ... be substituted for the material force of arms, (2) there must be simultaneous and reciprocal diminution of armaments, (3) a mechanism for international arbitration must be established, (4) true liberty and common rights over the sea should exist, (5) there should be a renunciation of war indemnities, (6) occupied territories should be evacuated, and (7) there should be an examination of rival claims. The best outcome to the war, according to Pope Benedict XV, was an immediate restoration of the status quo without reparations or any form of forced demands. Although the plan seemed unattainable due to the severity of the war thus far, it appealed to Charles, perhaps as a way to fulfill and preserve his role as Catholic Emperor of Austria and Apostolic King of Hungary. The beatification nevertheless raised controversy over the mistaken claim that Charles authorised the use of poison gas by the Austro-Hungarian Army during World War I. The Emperor actually forbade its use.

Pope John Paul II, who was born Karol Józef Wojtyła in Wadowice (then part of Austrian Poland), was named after Karl. During a private audience with Archduke Rudolf (Karl's son), his sons and their families and Empress Zita (whom the Pope addressed as "his Empress" and bowed his head before) he told them the following:

Do you know why I was named Charles at baptism? Because my father had great admiration for Emperor Charles I, of whom he was a soldier.

From the beginning, Emperor Charles conceived of his office as a holy service to his people. His chief concern was to follow the Christian vocation to holiness also in his political actions. For this reason, his thoughts turned to social assistance.

On 31 January 2008, after a 16-month investigation, a Church tribunal recognized a second miracle attributed to Charles I. A "devout Baptist" from Orlando, Florida was allegedly cured after several recent converts to Roman Catholicism in Louisiana prayed for Charles's intercession.

In 2011, the League of Prayers for the promotion of Charles's cause set up a website, and Cardinal Christoph Schönborn of Vienna has sponsored the cause. One of Charles's granddaughters, Princess Maria-Anna Galitzine, has been a prominent figure in the campaign for sainthood.

== Titles, styles, honours and arms ==
Styles of Charles I of Austria & IV of Hungary
- Reference style: His Imperial and Royal Apostolic Majesty
- Spoken style: Your Imperial and Royal Apostolic Majesty

Monarchical styles of Károly IV of Hungary
- Reference style: His Apostolic Majesty
- Spoken style: Your Apostolic Majesty

Imperial monogram as Emperor of Austria

Royal monogram as Apostolic King of Hungary

=== Titles and styles ===
- 17 August 1887 – 28 June 1914: His Imperial and Royal Highness Archduke Charles of Austria, Royal Prince of Hungary, Bohemia and Croatia
- 28 June 1914 – 21 November 1916: His Imperial and Royal Highness The Archduke of Austria-Este
- 21 November 1916 – 3 April 1919: His Imperial and Royal Apostolic Majesty The Emperor of Austria, Apostolic King of Hungary and Croatia, Slavonia and Dalmatia

=== Honours ===
- Austria-Hungary:
  - Knight of the Golden Fleece, 1905
  - Grand Cross of the Military Order of Maria Theresa, 1917
  - Knight Grand Officer of the Order of the Cross of Military Merit
  - Bronze Medal of Military Merit, on red ribbon, pre-1915; Gold ("Signum Laudis")
  - Military Cross for the 60th year of the reign of Franz Joseph
- (Tuscany) Tuscan Grand Ducal Family: Grand Cross of St. Joseph
- Sovereign Military Order of Malta: Bailiff Grand Cross of Honour and Devotion, with Distinction for Jerusalem
- United Kingdom:
  - Honorary Grand Cross of the Royal Victorian Order
  - Commemorative Medal for the Coronation of King George V
- Kingdom of Prussia:
  - Knight of the Black Eagle
  - Pour le Mérite (military), 20 May 1916; with Oak Leaves, 6 December 1916
  - Iron Cross, 1st and 2nd Classes
- Kingdom of Bavaria:
  - Knight of St. Hubert, 1908
  - Grand Cross of the Military Order of Max Joseph
- Kingdom of Saxony:
  - Knight of the Rue Crown
  - Grand Cross of the Military Order of St. Henry
- Belgium: Grand Cordon of the Order of Leopold
- Mecklenburg: Grand Cross of the Wendish Crown, with Crown in Ore
- Kingdom of Bulgaria:
  - Knight of Saints Cyril and Methodius
  - Order of Bravery, Grade I, 2nd Class

== Postage stamp ==
On 30 December 1916, Hungary issued a postage stamp featuring Charles as part of a series commemorating his coronation.

== Children ==
Charles and Princess Zita of Bourbon-Parma had eight children together.

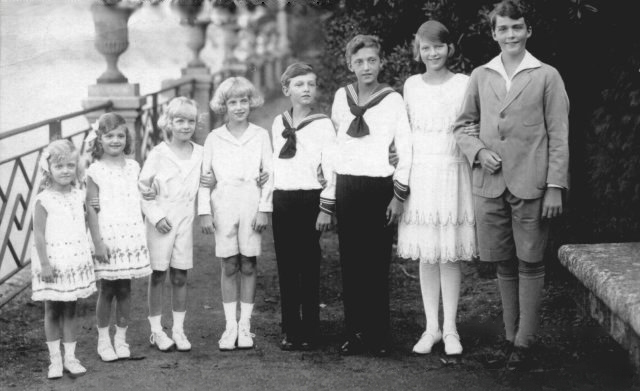
The children in Funchal, 1920s

Name	Birth	Death	Notes
Crown Prince Otto	20 November 1912	4 July 2011 (aged 98)	married (1951) Princess Regina of Saxe-Meiningen (1925–2010); seven children.
Archduchess Adelheid	3 January 1914	2 October 1971 (aged 57)	
Archduke Robert	8 February 1915	7 February 1996 (aged 80)	Archduke of Austria-Este; married (1953) Princess Margherita of Savoy-Aosta (7 April 1930 – 10 January 2022); five children.
Archduke Felix	31 May 1916	6 September 2011 (aged 95)	married (1952) Princess Anna-Eugénie of Arenberg (5 July 1925 – 9 June 1997); seven children.
Archduke Karl Ludwig	10 March 1918	11 December 2007 (aged 89)	married (1950) Princess Yolanda of Ligne (6 May 1923 – 13 September 2023); four children.
Archduke Rudolf	5 September 1919	15 May 2010 (aged 90)	married (1953) Countess Xenia Czernichev-Besobrasov (11 June 1929 – 20 September 1968); four children. Second marriage (1971) Princess Anna Gabriele of Wrede (born 11 September 1940); one daughter.
Archduchess Charlotte	1 March 1921	23 July 1989 (aged 68)	married (1956) George, Duke of Mecklenburg (5 October [O.S. 23 September] 1899 – 6 July 1963).
Archduchess Elisabeth	31 May 1922	7 January 1993 (aged 70)	married (1949) Prince Heinrich Karl Vincenz of Liechtenstein (5 August 1916 – 17 April 1991), grandson of Prince Alfred; five children.

== Ancestry ==
Ancestors of Charles I of Austria

8. Archduke Franz Karl of Austria
4. Archduke Karl Ludwig of Austria
9. Princess Sophie of Bavaria
2. Archduke Otto Franz of Austria
10. Ferdinand II of the Two Sicilies
5. Princess Maria Annunziata of Bourbon-Two Sicilies
11. Archduchess Maria Theresa of Austria
1. Charles I of Austria
12. John, King of Saxony
6. George, King of Saxony
13. Princess Amalie Auguste of Bavaria
3. Princess Maria Josepha of Saxony
14. Ferdinand II of Portugal
7. Infanta Maria Ana of Portugal
15. Maria II of Portugal

== See also ==
- List of heirs to the Austrian throne

== Notes ==
Charles I of Austria House of Habsburg-Lorraine Cadet branch of the House of Lorraine Born: 17 August 1887 Died: 1 April 1922
Regnal titles
Preceded by Franz Joseph I	Emperor of Austria; King of Bohemia; King of Galicia and Lodomeria; King of Hungary; King of Croatia, Slavonia and Dalmatia; 1916–1918	Dissolution of Austria-Hungary
Titles in pretence
Dissolution of Austria-Hungary	— TITULAR — Emperor of Austria; King of Bohemia; King of Galicia and Lodomeria; King of Hungary; King of Croatia, Slavonia and Dalmatia; 1918–1922	Succeeded by Crown Prince Otto
Preceded by Archduke Franz Ferdinand	— TITULAR — Archduke of Austria-Este; 28 June 1914 – 16 April 1917; Reason for succession failure: Title abolished in 1860	Succeeded by Archduke Robert
