= Eckartsau =

- Municipality
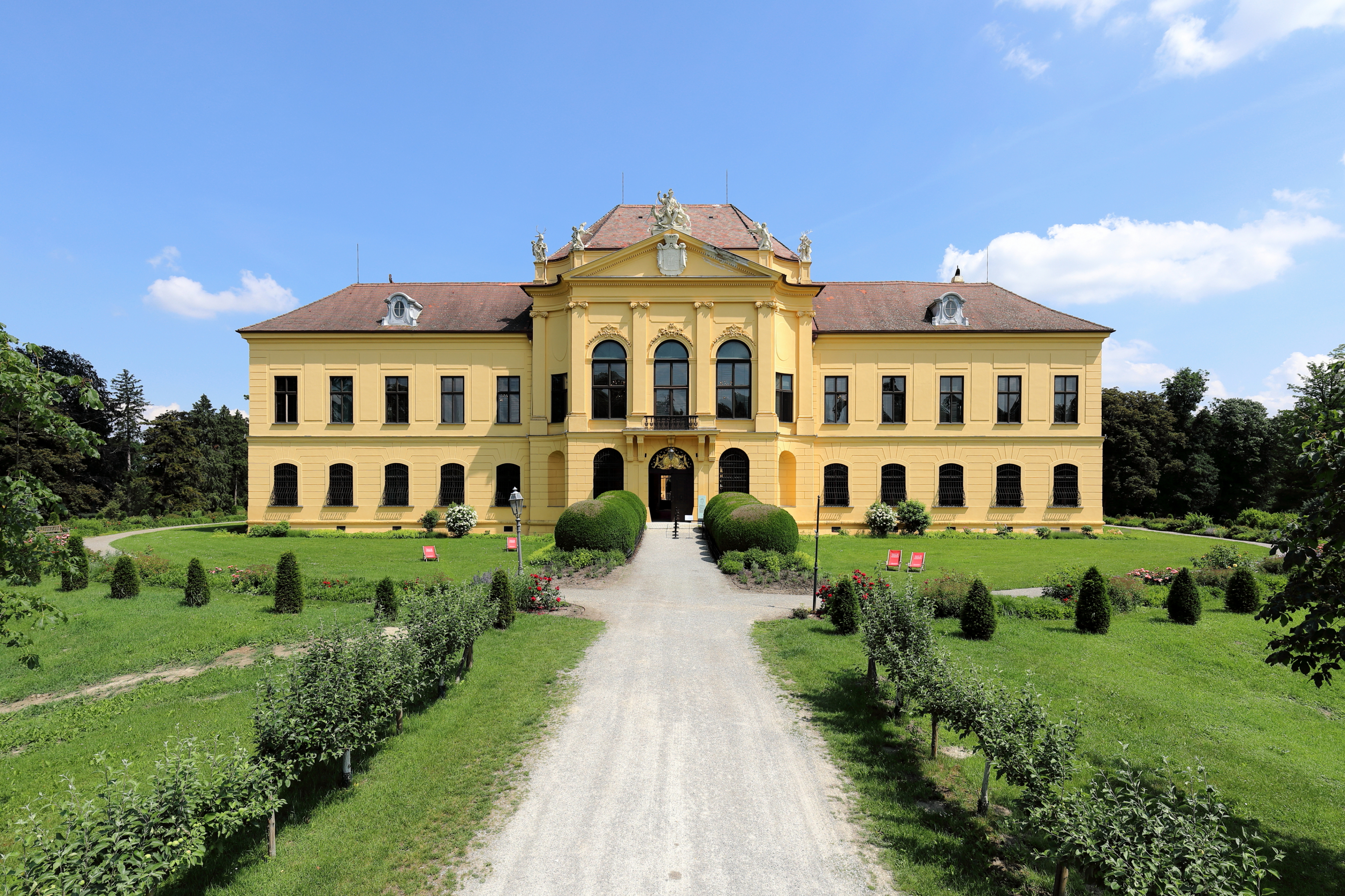
- Eckartsau Castle

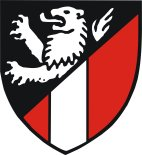
- Coat of arms

- Location within Austria
- Coordinates: 48°7′N 16°48′E
- Country: Austria
- State: Lower Austria
- District: Gänserndorf

Government
  - Mayor: Josef Lukacs

Area
  - Total: 48.98 km^{2} (18.91 sq mi)
- Elevation: 147 m (482 ft)

Population (2018-01-01)
  - Total: 1,283
  - Density: 26.19/km^{2} (67.84/sq mi)
- Time zone: UTC+1 (CET)
  - Summer (DST): UTC+2 (CEST)
- Postal code: 2305
- Area code: 02214
- Website: www.eckartsau.gv.at

Eckartsau (Czech: Krcov) is a town in the district of Gänserndorf in the Austrian state of Lower Austria.

== History ==
Schloss Eckartsau was the last residence of Charles I of Austria prior to his departure from the former Austria-Hungary in March, 1919.

The present Eckartsau was formed in 1971 from the union of the market town Eckartsau with Witzelsdorf and the villages Kopfstetten, Pframa and Wagram.

== Subdivisions ==
- Eckartsau
- Kopfstetten
- Pframa
- Wagram an der Donau
- Witzelsdorf

== See also ==
- Schloss Eckartsau (de)
- Marchegger Ostbahn (de)
