= Gentlewoman =

Woman of good family

A gentlewoman (from the Latin gentilis, belonging to a gens, and English 'woman') in the original and strict sense is a woman of good family, analogous to the Latin generosus and generosa. The closely related English word "gentry" derives from the Old French genterise, gentelise, with much of the meaning of the French noblesse and the German Adel, but without the strict technical requirements of those traditions, such as quarters of nobility.

By association with gentleman, the word can refer to:

- A woman of gentle birth or high social position;
- A woman attending a great lady (as, for example, the character in William Shakespeare's Macbeth called only 'Gentlewoman', who attends Lady Macbeth). This might be a court appointment as the female equivalent to a valet de chambre.
- A woman with good manners and high standards of behaviour.

== At court ==
From the time of Queen Mary I and Queen Elizabeth I, the title Gentlewoman of Her Majesty's Bedchamber was borne by ladies serving the Queen of England, later becoming Lady of the Bedchamber.

== United States Congress ==
'Gentlewoman' also has a local usage in the United States House of Representatives, referring to a female member of the House, as in "the gentlewoman from [state]".

== Some uses in literature ==
- Enitan Bereola II, Gentlewoman: Etiquette for a Lady, from a Gentleman (2014)
- Isabella Whitney, The Copy of a Letter, Lately Written in Meter by a Young Gentlewoman: to her Unconstant Lover, ca. 1567 earliest known volume of English language secular poetry published by a woman
- Jane Anger: Her Protection for Women to defend them against the scandalous reports of a late surfeiting Lover... Written by Jane Anger, Gentlewoman at London (1589)
- Richard Braithwait's The English Gentlewoman (1631), followed his The English Gentleman (1630), both being books about acceptable behaviour.
- "Helena, a Gentlewoman", in All's Well That Ends Well
- A Yorkshire Gentlewoman and Her Son by George Chapman (17th century)
- "Quartilla, gentlewoman to Triphoena", in Holland's Leaguer (1631) by Shackerley Marmion
- "Mrs Pleasant, a handsome young Gentlewoman of a good fortune" in The Parson's Wedding (1641) by Thomas Killigrew
- Anne Bradstreet, The Tenth Muse Lately Sprung Up into America, by a Gentlewoman in such Parts (1647)
- Hannah Woolley, The Gentlewoman's Companion; or, a Guide to the Female Sex (1673)
- Eliza Smith, The Compleat Housewife: or, Accomplished Gentlewoman’s Companion (16th edition ed., 1758)
- The Gentlewoman's Magazine (18th century periodical)
- Arvind Nehra, Letters of an Indian Judge to an English Gentlewoman (1934)
- Charles Angell Bradford, Blanche Parry, Queen Elizabeth's Gentlewoman (1935)
- Margery Sharp The Foolish Gentlewoman (1948)
- Langton, A., A Gentlewoman in Upper Canada (1950)
- Mary Hallock Foote, A Victorian Gentlewoman in the Far West: The Reminiscences of Mary Hallock Foote (1972)
- Jezail Brett, a witness from the video game The Great Ace Attorney Chronicles developed by Capcom.

== See also ==
- The Gentlewoman
- Gentleman
- Lady
- Title
- Cult of Domesticity
- English rose (epithet)
- Good Wife, Wise Mother
- Ideal womanhood
- Yamato-damashii
- Yamato nadeshiko
- María Clara
- Seven Heavenly Virtues
