= Pierre David =

Pierre David may refer to:

- Pierre David (mayor) (1771–1839), Belgian politician
- Pierre David (film producer) (born 1944), Canadian film producer
