= Enitan =

Enitan is a given name. Notable people with the name include:

- Enitan Bababunmi (1940–2017), Nigerian academic
- Enitan Badru (born 1953), Nigerian politician
- Enitan Bereola II (born 1982), Nigerian-American author
- Enitan Carrol, British physician
- Enitan Ransome-Kuti (born 1964), Nigerian general
- Adeyeye Enitan Ogunwusi (born 1974), Nigerian ruler
