= Regina von Habsburg =

Wife of Otto von Habsburg (1925–2010)

- Crown Princess of Austria-Hungary
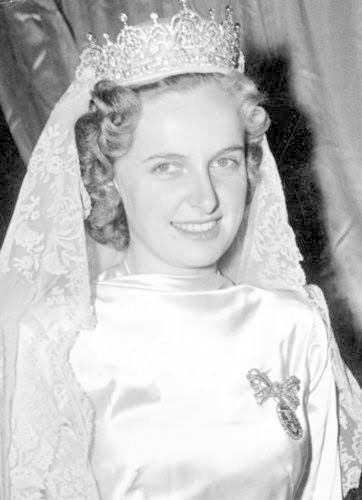
- Regina in 1951
- Born: 6 January 1925; Würzburg, Germany
- Died: 3 February 2010 (aged 85); Pöcking, Germany
- Burial: Imperial Crypt, Vienna
- Spouse: Otto von Habsburg (m. 1951)
- Issue: Andrea von Habsburg; Monika von Habsburg; Michaela von Habsburg; Gabriela von Habsburg; Walburga von Habsburg; Karl von Habsburg; Georg von Habsburg
- House: Saxe-Meiningen
- Father: Georg, Prince of Saxe-Meiningen
- Mother: Countess Klara Marie von Korff genannt Schmising-Kerssenbrock

Regina von Habsburg (née Princess Regina Helene Elisabeth Margarete of Saxe-Meiningen; 6 January 1925 – 3 February 2010), also known by the traditional royal title of Archduchess Regina of Austria, was a German-born Austrian social worker. She was a member of the House of Wettin by birth and married to Otto von Habsburg, the last heir of the Austro-Hungarian Empire.

== Early years ==
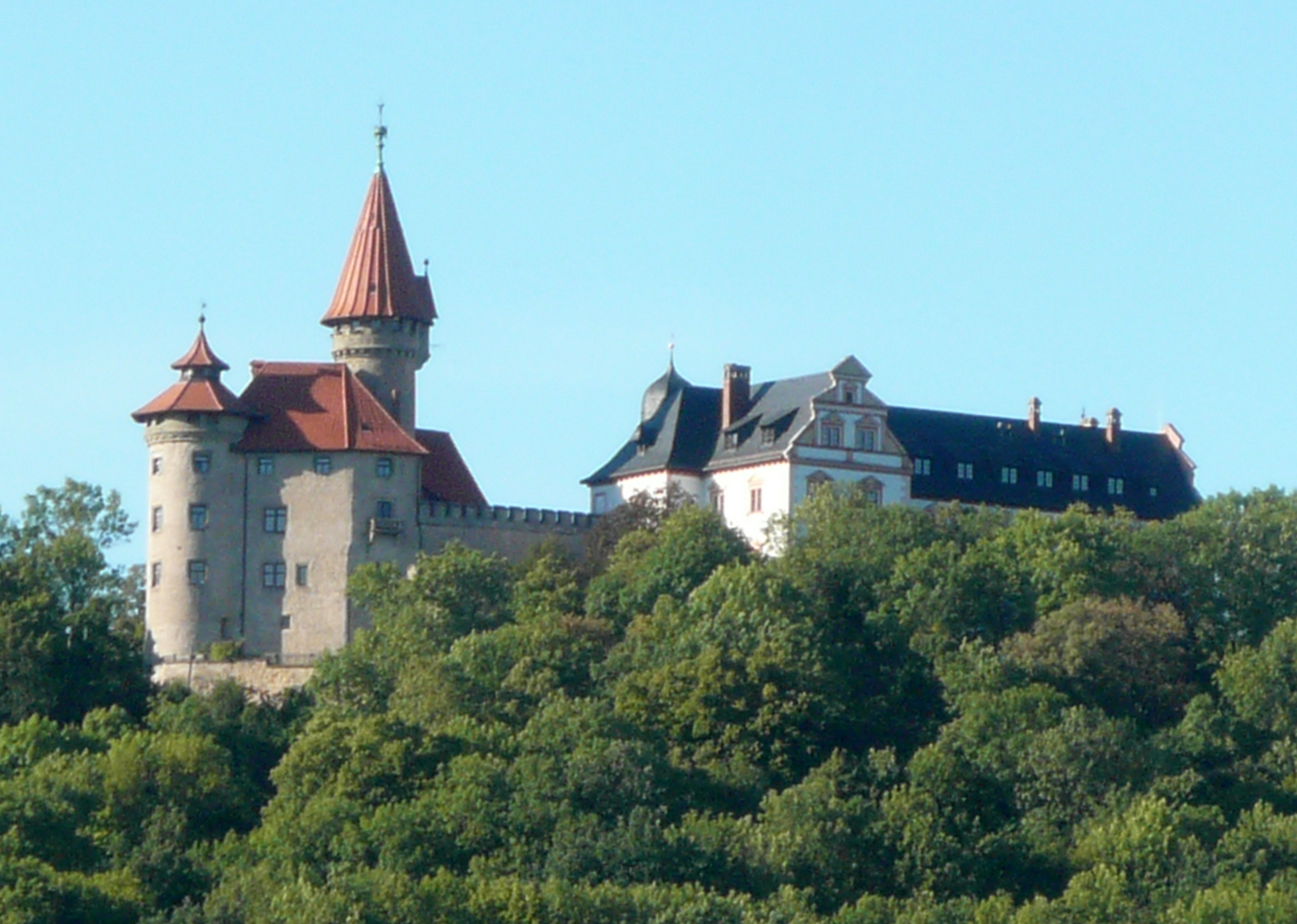
The Veste Heldburg castle, where Princess Regina grew up

Regina was born in Würzburg. She was the youngest of four children born to Prince Georg of Saxe-Meiningen and his wife, Countess Klara Marie von Korff genannt Schmising-Kerssenbrock (1895–1992).

A sister, Princess Marie Elisabeth, died an infant in 1923. The elder brother, Prince Anton Ulrich, was killed in action during the Second World War, whereas the younger, Friedrich Alfred, became a Carthusian monk.

Although the Saxe-Meiningen dynasty was Protestant, Regina was raised in the Roman Catholic faith of her mother. She grew up in the Veste Heldburg which overlooks the Heldburger Land in south Thuringia. Her father, a judge in Meiningen and Hildburghausen, joined the Nazi Party in 1933 and died a captive at the Soviet camp for prisoners of war at Cherepovets in 1946. Her mother had fled with her to West Germany.

Regina studied social work at Bamberg and then worked in Munich at a Caritas home for Hungarian refugees. In 1949, she met Otto von Habsburg, the heir of the House of Habsburg-Lorraine and the last crown prince of the dissolved Austria-Hungary, when he came to visit his former subjects in the Caritas home. Regina and Otto were engaged in 1950. They were fourth cousins as both were descendants of Karl Ludwig, Prince of Hohenlohe-Langenburg and his wife Countess Amalie Henriette of Solms-Baruth.

== Marriage ==
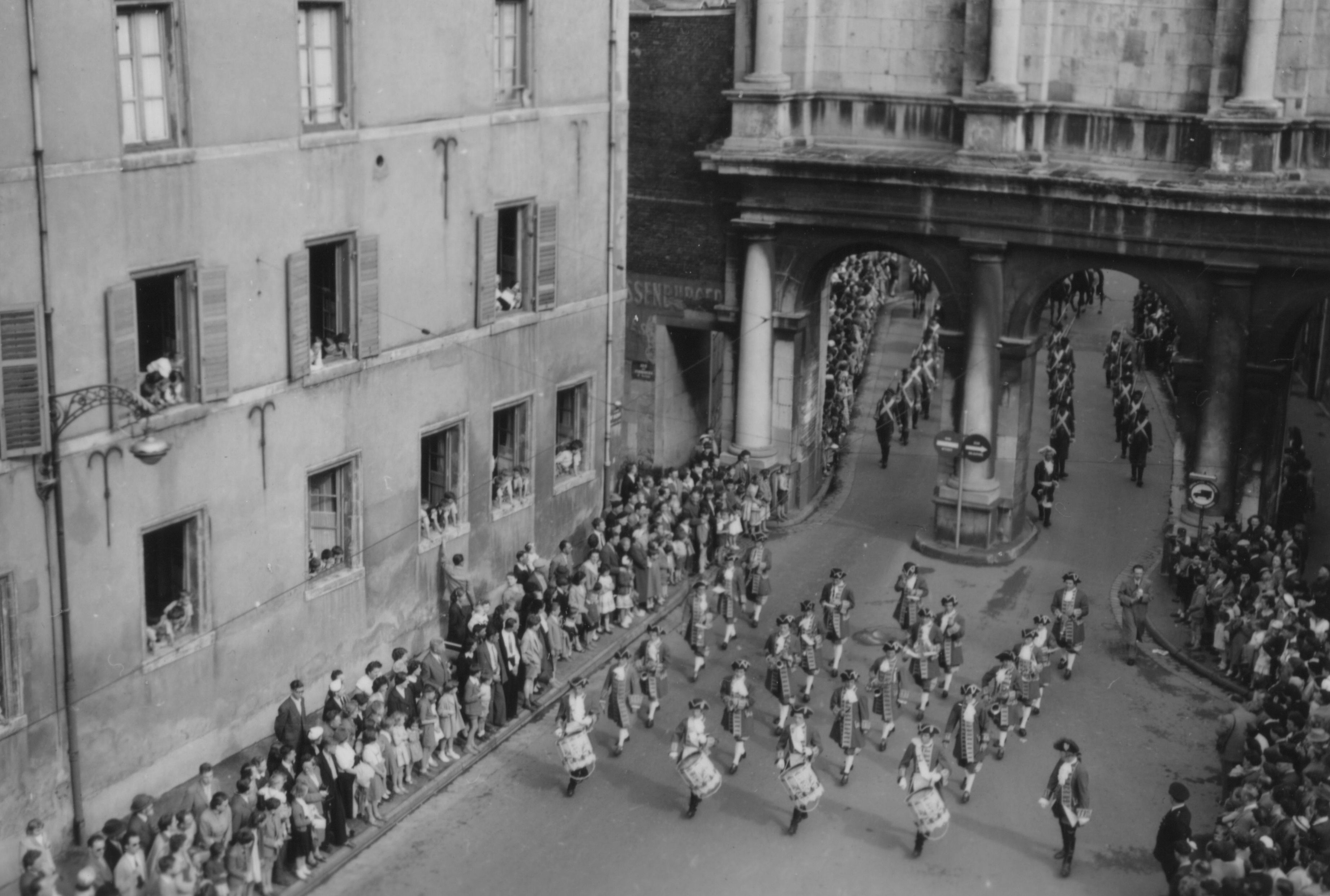
Regina and Otto's wedding procession

As Otto was prohibited from entering Austria until 1966, his and Regina's wedding had to be celebrated elsewhere. The wedding was held on 10 May 1951 in the Church of Saint-François-des-Cordeliers in Nancy, where several members of the House of Lorraine are buried. Pope Pius XII gave his blessing. Unusually among the heirs to deposed monarchies, Otto did not use royal titles or pursue his claim. Instead, he had a political career in the European Parliament, the success of which he attributed to Regina's support. From 10 May 1954 until her death Regina and Otto lived at Villa Austria, also called the Kaiservilla, in Pöcking near Lake Starnberg.

In her dynastic role as wife of the head of the House of Habsburg-Lorraine, Regina acted as protectress of the all-female Roman Catholic Order of the Starry Cross, grand mistress of the similar Order of Saint Elizabeth, and an honorary lady grand cross of the Sovereign Order of Malta.

In April 1985 she represented her husband Otto at the reburial of the remains of Albert II, Duke of Austria in the Gaming Charterhouse.

== Later life ==
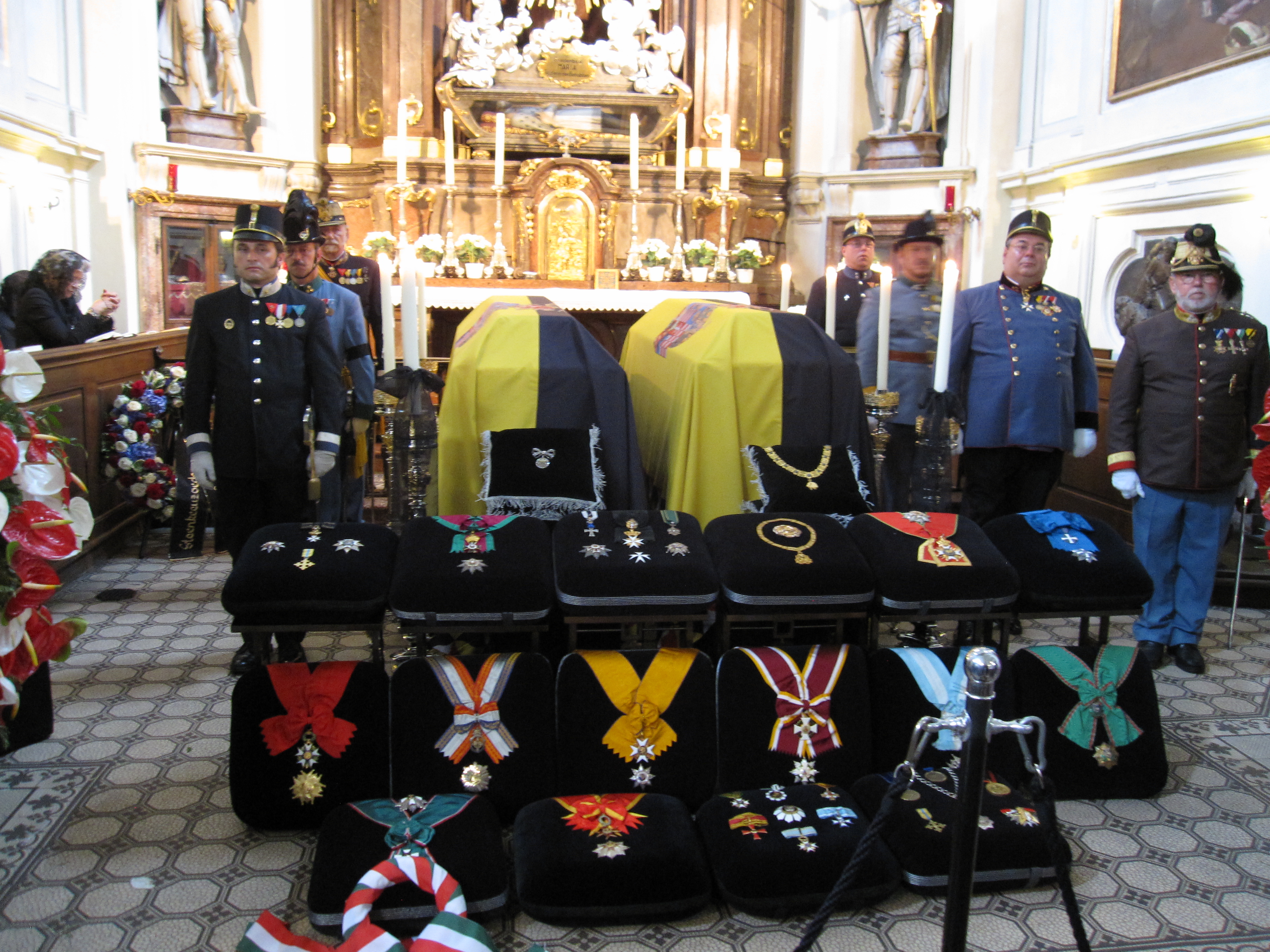
Regina and Otto lying in repose in the Capuchin Church, Vienna, draped with the Habsburg standard. The guards of honour are dressed in Austro-Hungarian uniforms.

On 2 December 2005 Regina had a stroke and was taken to a hospital in Nancy. By 22 February 2006 she had recovered sufficiently to participate in the transfer of the remains of her mother and her brother, Anton Ulrich, to the vault of the Veste Heldburg in the churchyard of Heldburg. The transfer of the remains of her father from Cherepovets took place in the spring of 2007.

Regina died in Pöcking on 3 February 2010, aged 85, and was entombed at Veste Heldburg on 10 February. Her remains, except for her heart, were moved to Mariazell and then to the Kaisergruft in Vienna at the time of her husband's funeral on 16 July 2011.

== Children ==
Regina and Otto had two sons and five daughters:

- Andrea von Habsburg (born 30 May 1953), married Imperial Count Karl Eugen von Neipperg and had issue; one of them, Dominik, married Marie-Anna, Princess of Salm-Salm, a descendant of Friedrich, Prince of Waldeck and Pyrmont and his wife Princess Bathildis of Schaumburg-Lippe
- Monika von Habsburg (born 13 September 1954), married Don Luis María Gonzaga de Casanova-Cárdenas y Barón, 13th Duke of Santángelo
- Michaela von Habsburg (born 13 September 1954), married firstly Eric Alba-Teran d'Antin and secondly Count Hubertus von Kageneck
- Gabriela von Habsburg (born 14 October 1956), married Christian Meister, divorced in 1997 and then annulled
- Walburga von Habsburg (born 5 October 1958), married Count Archibald Douglas
- Karl von Habsburg (born 11 January 1961), married Baroness Francesca Anne Dolores Thyssen-Bornemisza de Kászon et Impérfalva, civilly divorced in 2017
- Georg von Habsburg (born 16 December 1964), married Duchess Eilika of Oldenburg

== Honours ==
- House of Saxe-Meiningen: Dame, Special Class of the Royal Decoration of Honour of the Saxe-Ernestine
- (Austria-Hungary) House of Habsburg: Grand Mistress Dame of the Imperial and Royal Order of the Starry Cross
- (Austria-Hungary) House of Habsburg: Grand Mistress Dame Grand Cordon of the Imperial and Royal Order of Elisabeth
- Sovereign Military Order of Malta: Dame Grand Cross of Honour and Devotion of the Order of Saint John

Regina von Habsburg House of Saxe-Meiningen Cadet branch of the House of Wettin Born: 6 January 1925 Died: 3 February 2010
Austro-Hungarian royalty
Titles in pretence
Vacant Title last held by Zita of Bourbon-Parma	— TITULAR — Empress consort of Austria; Queen consort of Bohemia; Queen consort of Galicia and Lodomeria; Queen consort of Hungary; Queen consort of Croatia, Slavonia and Dalmatia; 1951–2010; Reason for succession failure: Monarchy abolished in 1918	Vacant Title next held by Francesca Thyssen-Bornemisza
