= Last Love =

Last Love may refer to:

== Books ==
- Last Love, a 1946 novel by Dorothy Black
- The Last Love, a 1963 novel by Thomas B. Costain

== Films ==
- Last Love (1935 film), an Austrian drama film
- Last Love (1947 film), an Italian drama film
- Last Love (1949 film), a French drama film
- Play for Today (1983) - ' Last Love ' (Series 13, episode 9) - (co-written by Reg Gadney), with Elizabeth Sellars and Dave King (actor)
- Last Love (2007 film), a Japanese film
- Last Love (2013 film), directed by Sandra Nettelbeck
- Last Love (short film), a 2017 Russian film

== Songs ==
- "Last Love", a 1963 song by Stranger Cole
- "Last Love" (Vera Lynn song), 1955
- "Last Love" (Miliyah Kato song), 2010
- "Last Love", a 2013 single by Rihwa
