= Order of the Starry Cross =

Habsburg chivalric order for women

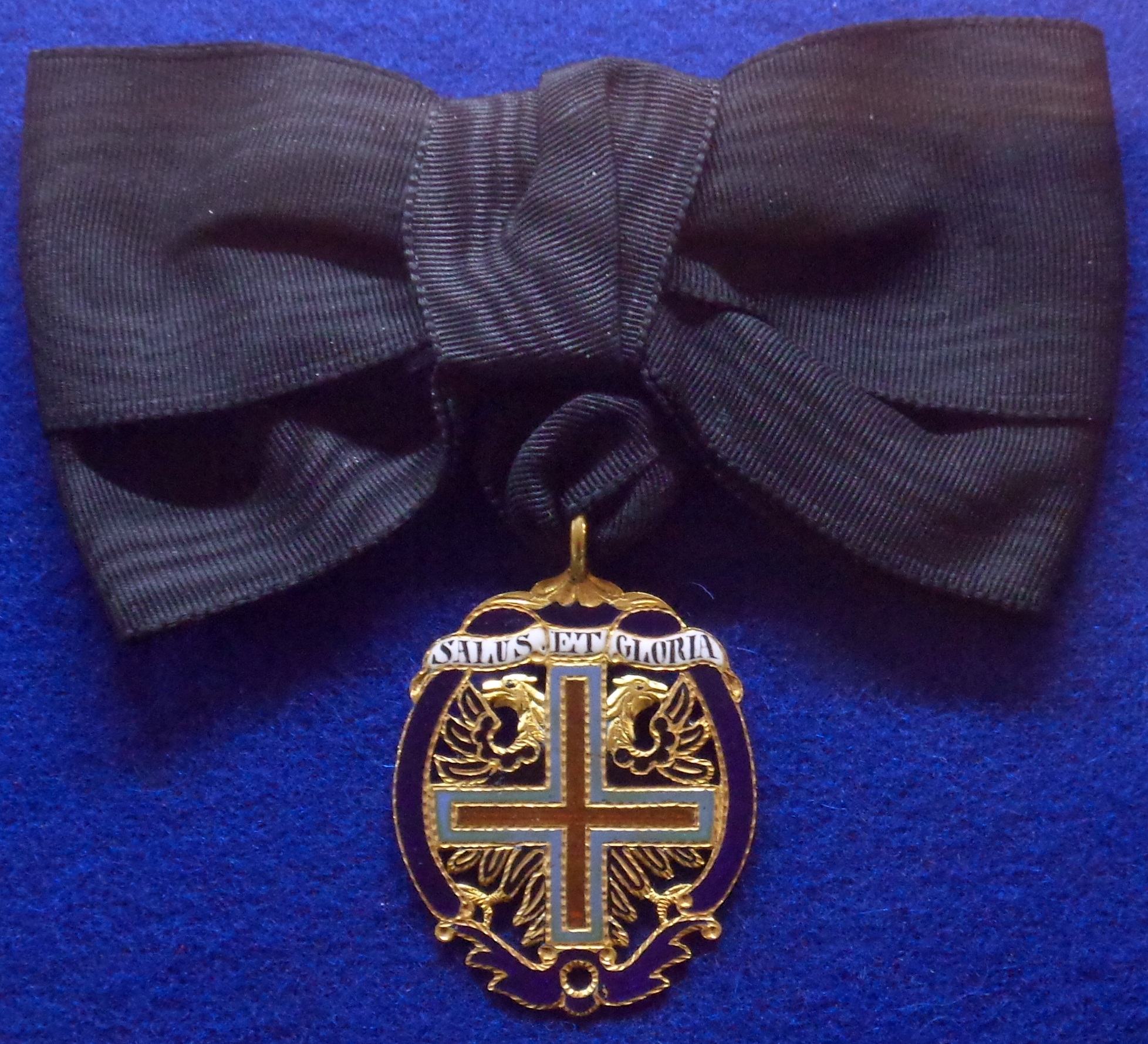
- Badge and ribbon of the order

Awarded by the Head of the House of Habsburg-Lorraine
- Type: Order of chivalry for women
- Royal house: House of Habsburg-Lorraine
- Religious affiliation: Roman Catholic
- Motto: SALUS ET GLORIA ("Hail and Glory")
- Awarded for: Devotion to the service and worship of the Holy Cross; A virtuous life in the exercise of religion and works of charity
- Sovereign: Archduke Karl
- High Protectress (Höchste Schutzfrau): Archduchess Gabriela of Austria
- Chancellor: Count Norbert Salburg-Falkenstein

Precedence
- Next (higher): none
- Next (lower): Military Order of Maria Theresia
- Equivalent: Order of the Golden Fleece
- Ribbon of the order

The Order of the Starry Cross (also known as Order of the Star Cross or Star Cross Order; German: Sternkreuz-Orden) is an imperial Austrian dynastic order for Catholic noble ladies, founded in 1668. The order still exists under the House of Habsburg-Lorraine.

== History ==
The Order was founded in 1668 by Eleonora Gonzaga of Mantua, dowager empress of the Holy Roman Empire. This all-female order was confirmed by Pope Clement IX on 28 June 1668 and was placed under the spiritual management of the Prince-Bishop of Vienna. Only high-born ladies could be invested with the Order, including “princesses, countesses, and other high nobility.” Once invested, members were to “devote themselves to the service and worship of the Holy Cross, and to lead a virtuous life in the exercise of religion and works of charity.”

According to legend, the Habsburg dynasty owned a piece of the True Cross on which Jesus was crucified. Though it is impossible to prove its authenticity, the holy relic was set in gold and worn by at least two Holy Roman Emperors, Maximilian II and Ferdinand III. Ferdinand III’s last consort, Empress Eleanora, was given the relic by her stepson, Emperor Leopold I, after Ferdinand’s 1657 death. In the aftermath of a fire at the Hofburg on 2 February 1668 the relic was discovered in near-perfect condition. The dowager empress founded the Order in celebration that the relic had survived the fire, believing it to be a true miracle.

In 1881, Empress Elisabeth accorded multiple noble ladies of the royal Belgian court the Starry Cross, after the engagement of Archduke Rudolf.

Members of the Order wore the following insignia:

"An oval medallion, with a broad blue enameled border, inclosing a black enameled Eagle with two heads, and claws, both of gold, on which lies a Gold Cross, enameled green, and bordered with brown wood. Over this, on an intwined (sic) wreath in black letters, on a white ground, is the motto of the Order, "Salus et Gloria” – (Hail and Glory.) It is worn, pendent to a strip of black riband (sic), on the left breast."

The order was conceived with only one class.

== High Protectresses (Höchste Schutzfrauen) ==
	Period	Name	Remarks
1.	1668–1686	Eleanor, Dowager Holy Roman Empress	born Princess Eleonora Gonzaga
2.	1686–1720	Eleanora Magdalena Theresia, Holy Roman Empress	born Princess Eleonora Magdalena Theresia of Neuburg
3.	1720–1742	Wilhelmina Amalia, Holy Roman Empress	born Princess Wilhelmina Amalia of Brunswick-Lüneburg
4.	1742–1750	Elisabeth Christina, Holy Roman Empress	born Princess Elisabeth Christina of Brunswick-Wolfenbüttel
5.	1750–1780	Maria Theresa, Holy Roman Empress and reigning Queen of Hungary and Bohemia	
6.	1780–1792	Maria Ludovika, Holy Roman Empress	born Infanta María Luisa of Spain
7.	1792–1807	Maria Theresa, Holy Roman Empress	born Princess Maria Teresa of the Two Sicilies
8.	1807–1816	Empress Maria Ludovika of Austria	born Archduchess Maria Ludovika of Austria-Este
9.	1816–1835	Empress Caroline Augusta of Austria	born Princess Caroline Augusta of Bavaria
10.	1835–1848	Empress Maria Anna of Austria	born Princess Maria Anna of Savoy
11.	1848–1854	Archduchess Sophie of Austria	born Princess Sophie of Bavaria
12.	1854–1898	Empress Elisabeth of Austria	born Duchess Elisabeth in Bavaria
13.	1898–1916	Archduchess Maria Josepha of Austria	born Princess Maria Josepha of Saxony
14.	1916–1951	Empress Zita of Austria	born Princess Zita of Bourbon-Parma
15.	1951–2007	Regina, Crown Princess of Austria	born Princess Regina of Saxe-Meiningen
16.	2007–present	Archduchess Gabriela of Austria	current High Protectress

== Current administration ==
According to the website of the Archdiocese of Vienna, the officers of the Order are:

- High Protectress: Archduchess Gabriela of Austria
- Chancellor: Count Norbert von Salburg-Falkenstein
- Secretary: Altgraf Niklas zu Salm-Reifferscheid-Raitz

== Sources ==
- Tagore, Rajah Sir Sourindro Mohun. The Orders of Knighthood, British and Foreign. Calcutta: The Catholic Orphan Press, 1884.
