= Gabriela von Habsburg =

Austrian Archduchess (born 1956)

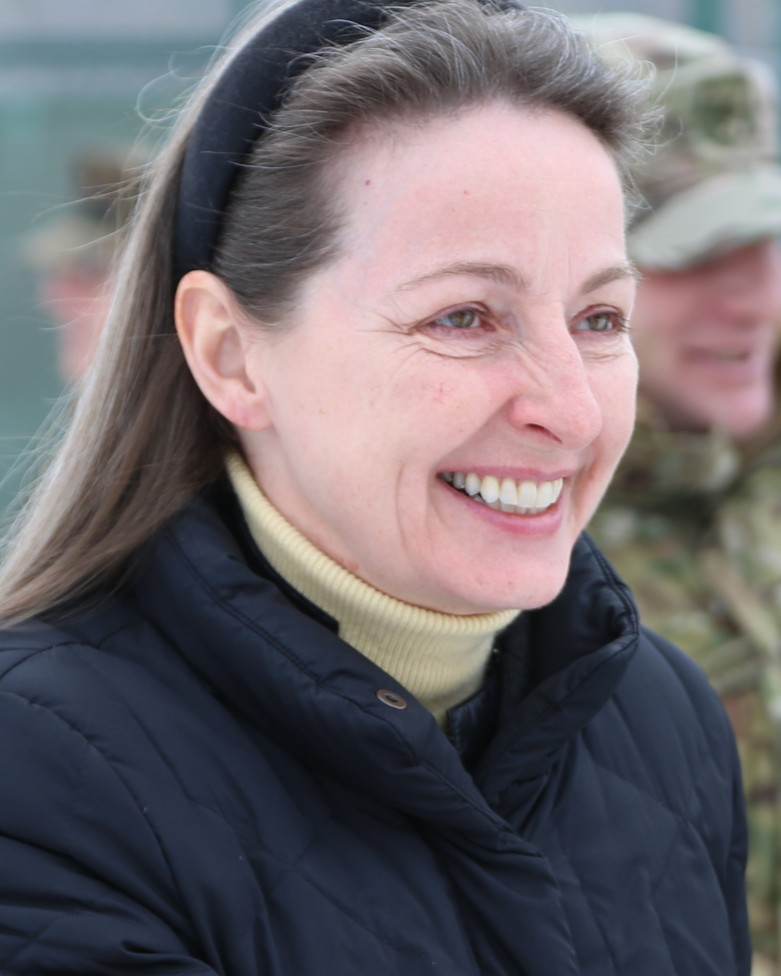
- Pictured in 2013

Ambassador of Georgia to Germany
- In office 6 November 2009 – 15 January 2013
- Preceded by: Levan Duchidze
- Succeeded by: Vladimer Chanturia

Personal details
- Born: 14 October 1956 (age 70) Luxembourg City, Luxembourg
- Spouse: Christian Meister (m. 1978; div. 1997)
- Children: 3
- Parents: Otto von Habsburg (father); Regina Prinzessin von Sachsen-Meiningen (mother)
- Website: www.habsburg.de

Gabriela von Habsburg (born 14 October 1956) is an abstract sculptor, working mainly in stainless steel as well as stone-printed lithography. She was the ambassador of Georgia to Germany from 2009 to 2013. She is the granddaughter of Charles I, the last emperor of Austria.

== Early life ==
Gabriela von Habsburg was born in Luxembourg, the fourth child of the German politician Otto von Habsburg, head of the House of Habsburg-Lorraine and erstwhile heir apparent to the throne of Austria-Hungary, and Regina (née Prinzessin von Sachsen-Meiningen). She was baptised with the names Gabriela Maria Charlotte Felicitas Elisabeth Antonia. The name in her birth certificate is Gabriela von Österreich-Ungarn.

Gabriela von Habsburg was raised at her parents' home in exile, Villa Austria, in Pöcking, Bavaria. As a result of the Habsburgs' banishment from Austria, she feels that she grew up devoid of any sense of pride of country and thus identifies as European. She believes that her dynasty's role in history shaped her upbringing, noting that her family "never spoke about anything at mealtimes except politics". A granddaughter of the last Austrian emperor, Charles I, she does not use the traditional Habsburg-Lorraine titles ("Princess Imperial and Archduchess of Austria, Princess Royal of Hungary and Bohemia", with the style of Imperial and Royal Highness).

After graduating in 1976, Gabriela von Habsburg studied philosophy for two years at LMU Munich. From 1978 to 1982, she studied art at the Munich Academy of Arts with Robert Jacobsen and Eduardo Paolozzi.

== Career ==
Since 2001, she has been an art professor at the Academy of Arts of Tbilisi, Georgia while also teaching at the Summer Academy of Arts in Neuburg an der Donau, Germany until 2005. She found the creativity and cheerfulness of her students in the face of the adversity then prevalent in Georgia inspiring. During her tenure there she was granted Georgian citizenship. Her five hectare vineyard in Georgia produces wine.

In November 2009, Georgia appointed Gabriela von Habsburg as its ambassador to Germany, and since March 2011, she has maintained a flat in Berlin. Believing that Georgian history served as a crucible for European culture, she has maintained that the liberalizing reforms of President Mikheil Saakashvili have been welcome and invigorating for Georgia's people and economy, which has prompted her to work for Georgia's membership in the European Market. She was dismissed from her position in January 2013, after the change of government in Georgia in October 2012.

Since March 2010, Gabriela von Habsburg has represented Georgia at the International Council of the Austrian Service Abroad.

== Public installations ==
- 1985 Museum of the State of Tyrolya (Ferdinandeum), Innsbruck, Austria
- 1990 National Academy of Science, Washington D.C.
- 1994 Voest Alpine MCE, Linz, Austria
- 1994 Achmatowa Museum, St. Petersburg, Russia
- 1994 Museion Bozen, Bolzano, Italy
- 1995 Museum for foreign Art, Riga, Latvia
- 1996 Museum Würth, Künzelsau, Germany
- 1997 Municipal Gallery of Budapest, Hungary
- 1998 City Museum of Skopje, Macedonia
- 1998 Galeria Murska Sobota, Slovenia
- 2004 Skulpturschweiz Foundation Sculpture park, Luzern, Switzerland
- 2007 Monument of the Rose Revolution in Georgia
- 2009 Monument to the Three Powers in the State, at the Ceremonial Palace of Georgia in Georgia

== Marriage and children ==
On 30 August 1978, in Pöcking, Bavaria, Gabriela was married civilly and on 5 September 1978 religiously at Mont Sainte-Odile to Christian Meister (born 1 September 1954 in Starnberg), a German attorney. They divorced in 1997 and the marriage was annulled canonically. Gabriela was the only one of her parents' seven children to marry a spouse who had neither a title nor an aristocratic name. They have three children and five grandchildren.

== Honours ==
=== Dynastic honours ===
Gabriela von Habsburg-Lothringen is sometimes referred to as "Archduchess of Austria", a reference to the defunct familial title of her grandfather, but says that "I do not like my family titles. Whatever you inherit, you haven’t done anything for".

- (Austria-Hungary) House of Habsburg-Lorraine: High Protectress of the Order of the Starry Cross

=== National state honours ===
- Georgia: Recipient of the Order of the Golden Fleece
- Georgia: Recipient of the Order of Honor

== Literature ==
Gabriela von Habsburg. Sculpture (English version) By Prof. Mathias Frehner and Prof. Carla Schulz-Hofmann Bucher GmbH & Co. Druck Verlag Netzwerk; (22. Oktober 2007) ISBN 978-3-902612-31-1

Gabriela von Habsburg.Skulpturen (German version) ISBN 978-3-902612-20-5
