= Georg von Habsburg =

Hungarian diplomat (born 1964)

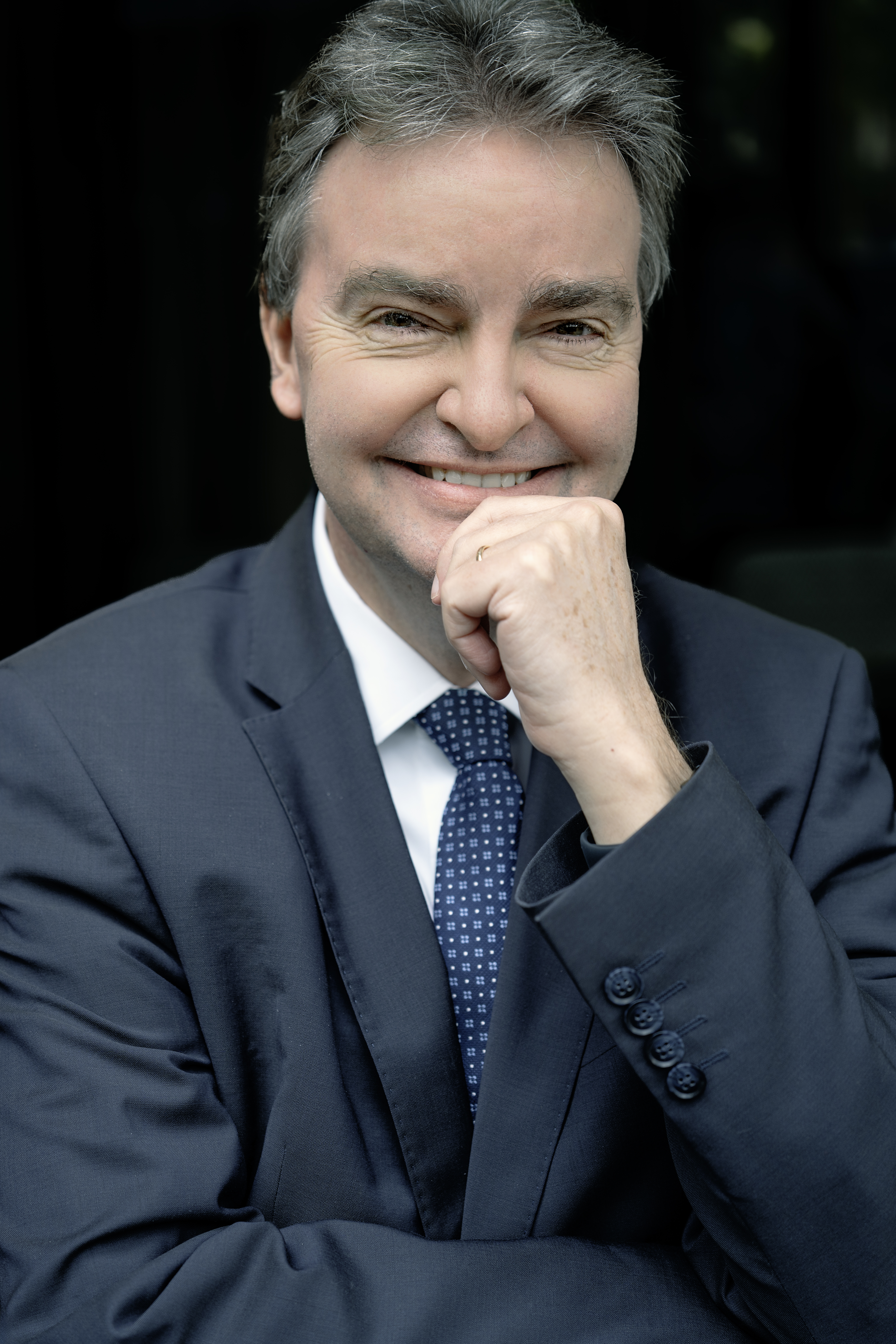
- Portrait in 2024

Ambassador of Hungary to Spain
- Incumbent
- Assumed office May 2025
- President: Tamás Sulyok; András Baka

Ambassador of Hungary to France
- In office 2020–2025
- President: János Áder; Katalin Novák; Tamás Sulyok

Personal details
- Born: 16 December 1964 (age 61) Starnberg, Bavaria, West Germany
- Spouse: Duchess Eilika of Oldenburg (m. 1997)
- Children: 3
- Parents: Otto von Habsburg (father); Regina Prinzessin von Sachsen-Meiningen (mother)
- Occupation: Diplomat

Georg von Habsburg (born 16 December 1964) is a Hungarian diplomat. He is referred to in Austria as Georg Habsburg-Lothringen and in Hungary as Habsburg György.

He has served as Hungary's ambassador to Spain since May 2025. Previously, he was the country's ambassador to France from 2020 to 2025.

== Family ties ==
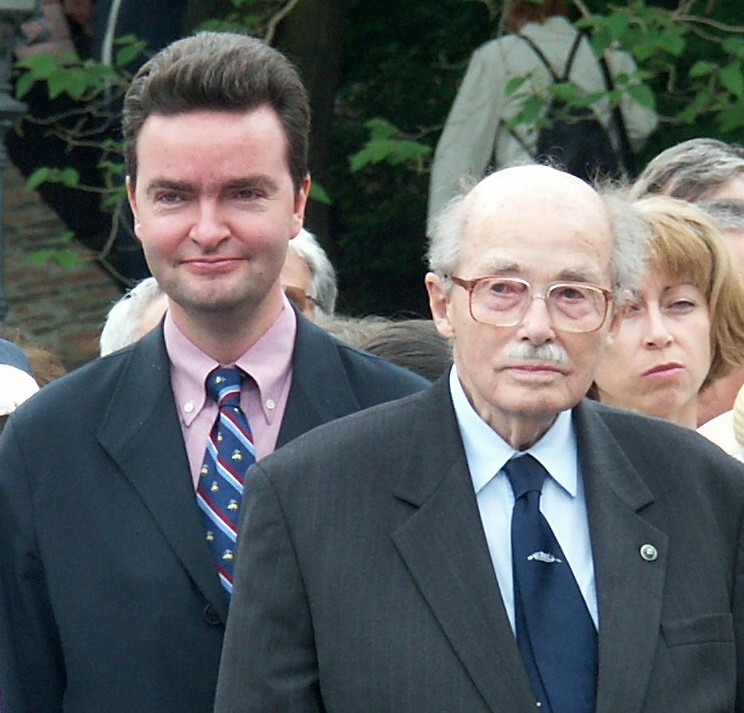
With his father in 2006

Born in Germany as Paul Georg Maria Joseph Dominikus, he is the second son (and seventh and youngest child) of Otto von Habsburg, the last Crown Prince of Austria-Hungary, and his wife Regina Prinzessin von Sachsen-Meiningen. His father, heir of Charles I and IV, the last monarch of Austria-Hungary, renounced all claims to the Austrian throne in 1961. Georg von Habsburg was raised at his parents' home in exile, Villa Austria in Pöcking, Bavaria.

He married Duchess Eilika of Oldenburg (born 22 August 1972 in Bad Segeberg), the elder daughter of Duke Johann of Oldenburg (younger son of Nikolaus, Hereditary Grand Duke of Oldenburg, and his wife Princess Helena of Waldeck and Pyrmont) and Countess Ilka of Ortenburg, on 18 October 1997 in Budapest, Hungary. He contracted a dynastic marriage according to the former Habsburg house laws, unlike his elder brother Karl in 1993. While Georg is a Catholic, Eilika has chosen to remain a Lutheran. The couple have three children.

He and his family live near the village of Sóskút, in Pest County in Hungary. Their eldest child was the first Habsburg to be born in Hungary in more than fifty years.

== Career ==
He was named as Hungary's ambassador extraordinary to the European Parliament in 1996. He served as the president of the Hungarian Red Cross from 2004 to 2012.

In December 2020, he was appointed as Hungary's ambassador to France. He served in that role until becoming the ambassador to Spain in May 2025.

== Honours and awards ==
=== Dynastic ===
- (Austria-Hungary) House of Habsburg-Lorraine:
  - Knight of the Order of the Golden Fleece
  - Deputy Grand Master of the Order of Saint George

=== National ===
- Holy See: Knight Commander with Star of the Order of St. Gregory the Great (2019)
- Tonga:
  - Grand Cross of The Most Devoted Royal Household Order of Tonga
  - King Tupou VI Coronation Medal

=== Other ===
- Civis Honoris Causa of the University of Debrecen
- Kopácsi Sándor Polgárőr Érdemrend Medal
- Honorary Citizen (Civis Honoris Causa) of the Budapest University of Technology and Economics
