= Steve Canal =

American writer

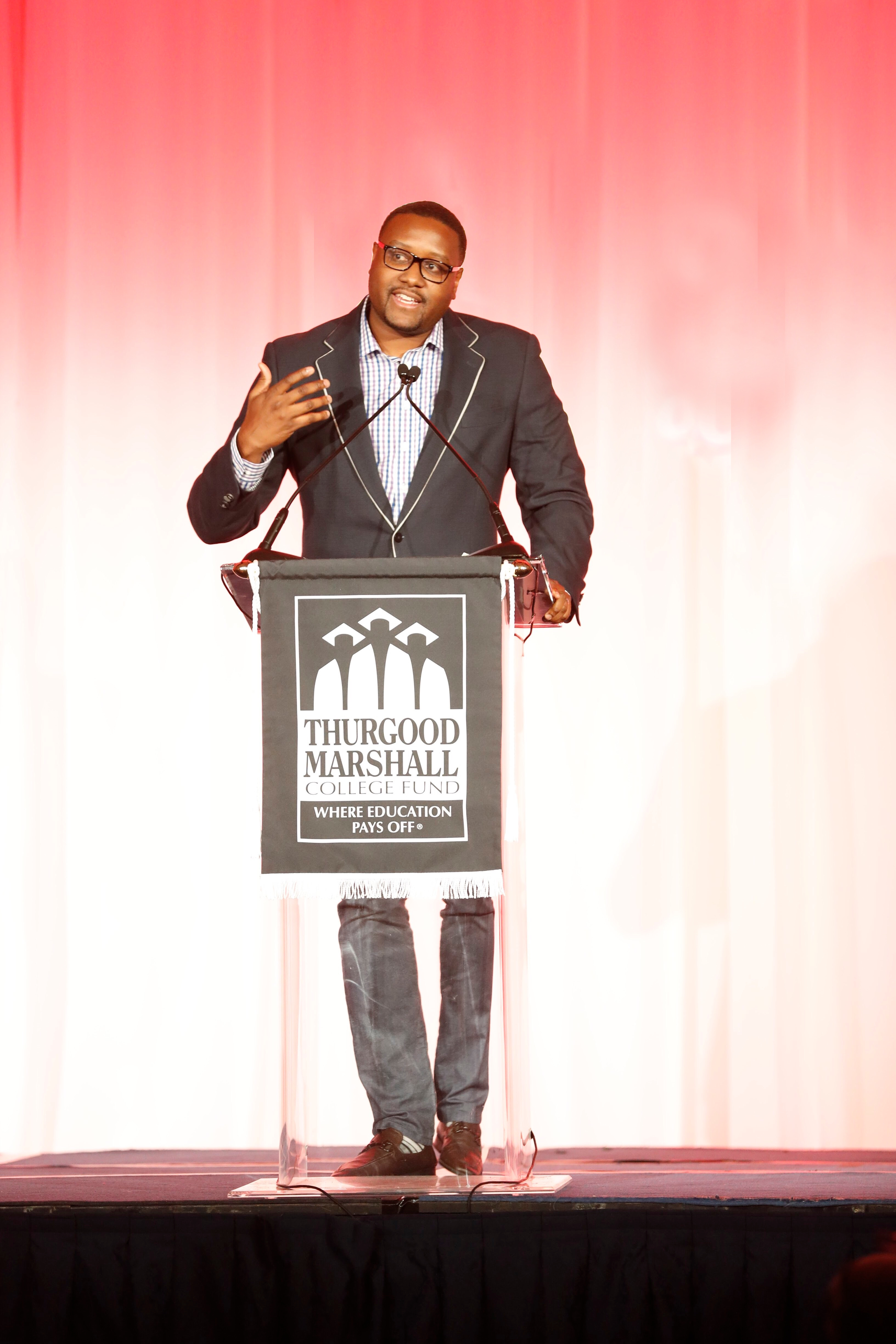
- Born: Steve Canal; January 17, 1980 (age 46); New York City, New York
- Education: Fordham University
- Occupations: Author, public speaker
- Spouse: Swin Cash (m. 2015)
- Writing career
- Language: English
- Notable work: The Mind of a Winner
- Website: Official website

Steve Canal (born January 17, 1980) is an American author, public speaker, branding expert and former basketball player based in New York City.

== Early life and education ==
Canal was born in New York City in 1980. His parents were born in Haiti and immigrated to the United States in the late 1970s. Canal received his early education in Nyack, New York, and attended Fordham University where he received a bachelor's degree in sociology in 2002. Canal played on the Fordham Rams men's basketball team in the Atlantic 10 Conference from 1998 to 2002.

== Career ==
Canal began his basketball career in 1998 while attending Fordham University in New York City. Canal represented Fordham Rams in 92 games, spreading over four seasons of Atlantic 10 Conference between 1998 and 2002. He played at forward position and scored over 340 points.

After basketball, Canal started his professional career as an operational manager at Vital Marketing, New York, in 2003. In 2011, Canal joined MillerCoors, a beer brewing company based in Chicago. Canal is currently serving as a National Community Affairs Lead at MillerCoors in New York City. He is accountable for the growth and execution of community investment and outreach strategies at the organization.

In 2017, Canal authored his debut book, The Mind of a Winner. The book was published in July with contributions from Daymond John, Barbara Corcoran, Enitan Bereola II, Grammy award winner 2 Chainz and Kenny Smith.The Mind of a Winner focuses on personal growth of an individual. The book rose to No. 1 on the Amazon bestseller list in August 2017. Canal is also the founder and CEO at The Brand Executive, a personal development firm based in New York City.

== Personal life ==
In 2015, Canal married his long-term girlfriend, Swin Cash, in Atlanta, Georgia. Cash is an executive with the NBA's New Orleans Pelicans and played in the Women's National Basketball Association.
