= Otto von Habsburg =

Heir to the Austrian throne (1912–2011)

- Crown Prince of Austria-Hungary
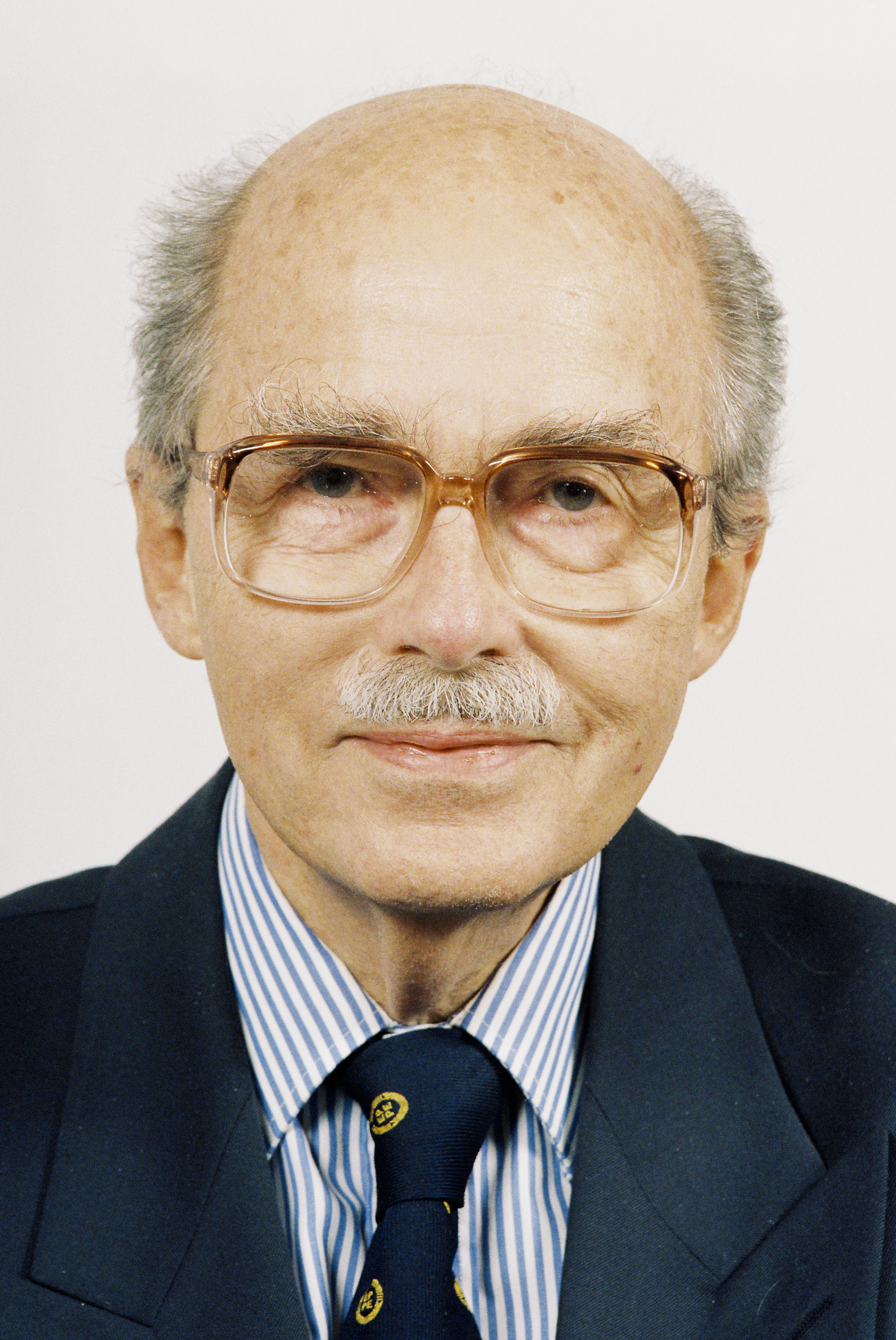
- Official portrait as an MEP, 1994

Head of the House of Habsburg-Lorraine
- Reign: 1 April 1922 – 1 January 2007
- Predecessor: Emperor Charles I & IV
- Successor: Karl von Habsburg
- Born: 20 November 1912; Reichenau an der Rax, Austria-Hungary
- Died: 4 July 2011 (aged 98); Pöcking, Germany
- Burial: 16 July 2011: Imperial Crypt (body); 17 July 2011; Pannonhalma Archabbey (heart)
- Spouse: Princess Regina of Saxe-Meiningen (m. 1951; died 2010)
- Issue: 7, including Gabriela, Walburga, Karl and Georg
- House: Habsburg-Lorraine
- Father: Charles I of Austria
- Mother: Zita of Bourbon-Parma

Member of the European Parliament
- In office 17 July 1979 – 20 July 1999
- Constituency: Germany

Personal details
- Citizenship: Austria (1912–1938; from 1965); Hungary (1912–2011); Nazi Germany (1938–1941); Stateless (1941–1946); Monaco (1946–1965); West Germany (1978–1990); Germany (from 1990); Croatia (from 1990)
- Party: Christian Social Union

Otto von Habsburg (Note: German: Franz Joseph Otto Robert Maria Anton Karl Max Heinrich Sixtus Xaver Felix Renatus Ludwig Gaetan Ignatius von Habsburg Santiago Pius Ignatius, Hungarian: Ferenc József Ottó Róbert Mária Antal Károly Max Heinrich Sixtus Xaver Felix Renatus Lajos Gaetan Pius Ignác) (20 November 1912 – 4 July 2011) was the last crown prince of Austria-Hungary from 1916 until its dissolution in November 1918. In 1922, he became the pretender to the former thrones, head of the House of Habsburg-Lorraine, and sovereign of the (Austrian) Order of the Golden Fleece, upon the death of his father. He resigned as Sovereign of the Golden Fleece in 2000 and as head of the Imperial House in 2007.

The eldest son of Charles I and IV, the last emperor of Austria and king of Hungary, and his wife, Zita of Bourbon-Parma, Otto was born as Franz Joseph Otto Robert Maria Anton Karl Max Heinrich Sixtus Xaver Felix Renatus Ludwig Gaetan Pius Ignatius von Habsburg, third in line to the thrones, as Archduke Otto of Austria, Royal Prince of Hungary, Bohemia, and Croatia. With his father's accession in 1916, he was likely to become emperor and king. As his father never abdicated, Otto was considered by himself, his family and Austro-Hungarian legitimists to be the rightful emperor-king from his father's death in 1922.

Otto was exiled in 1919 and grew up mostly in Spain. His devout Catholic mother raised him according to the old curriculum of Austria-Hungary, preparing him to become a Catholic monarch. During his life in exile, he lived in Austria, Belgium, France, Madeira (Portugal), Spain, Switzerland, the US, and from 1954 until his death, in Bavaria (Germany), in the residence Villa Austria. He had been stateless de jure and de facto, and possessed passports of the Order of Malta and Spain.

Otto was active on the European political stage from the 1930s, by promoting the cause of Habsburg restoration and as an early proponent of European integration. He was a fierce opponent of Nazism, nationalism, and communism. He has been described as one of the leaders of the Austrian resistance. After the 1938 Anschluss, he was sentenced to death by the Nazis and fled Europe to the US.

Otto was Vice President (1957–73) and President (1973–2004) of the International Paneuropean Union movement. From 1979 to 1999, he served as a Member of the European Parliament for Germany's Christian Social Union of Bavaria (CSU). He took a strong interest in Eastern Bloc countries behind the Iron Curtain, and had an empty chair set up in the European Parliament to symbolize their absence. Otto played a notable role in the revolutions of 1989 as a co-initiator of the Pan-European Picnic. He was a strong supporter of EU membership for Central and Eastern European countries. He published several books on historical and political affairs.

Otto has been described as one of the "architects of the European idea and of European integration" together with Robert Schuman, Konrad Adenauer, and Alcide De Gasperi. His funeral took place at St. Stephen's Cathedral in Vienna on 16 July 2011; he was entombed in the Imperial Crypt in Vienna and his heart buried in Pannonhalma Archabbey in Hungary.

== Early life ==
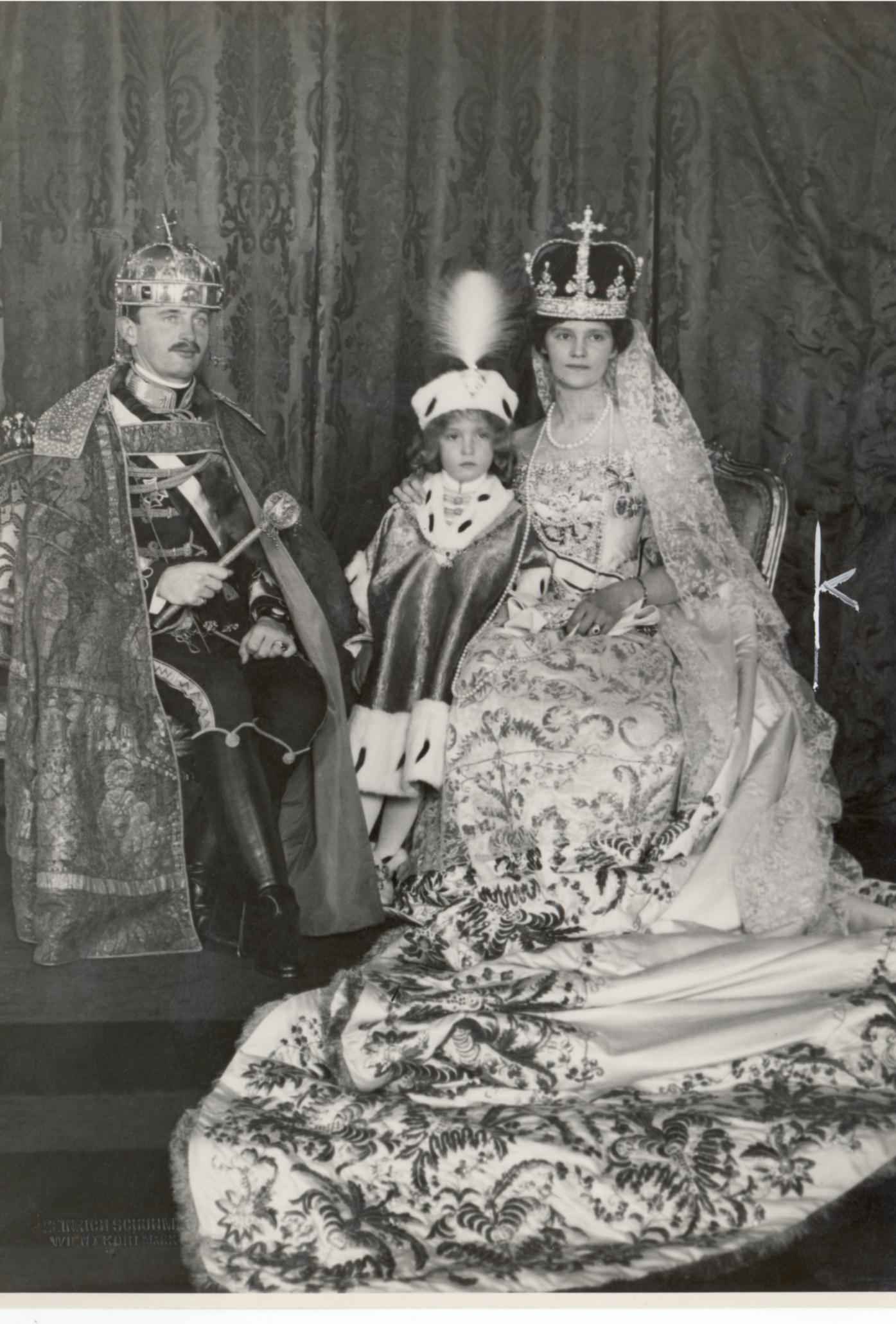
The young crown prince Otto with his parents posing for official photographs on the occasion of the coronation in Budapest, 1916

Otto von Habsburg at his parents' coronation in Budapest on 30 December 1916

Otto was born at Villa Wartholz in Reichenau an der Rax, Austria-Hungary, during the reign of his great-granduncle, Franz Joseph I of Austria. He was baptised Franz Joseph Otto Robert Maria Anton Karl Max Heinrich Sixtus Xaver Felix Renatus Ludwig Gaetan Pius Ignatius on 25 November 1912 at Villa Wartholz by Franz Xaver Cardinal Nagl, Prince-Archbishop of Vienna. This name was chosen so that he might reign as "Franz Joseph II" in the future. His godfather was Franz Joseph I, Emperor of Austria (represented by Archduke Franz Ferdinand of Austria); his godmother was his maternal grandmother Infanta Maria Antonia of Portugal.

In November 1916, Otto became Crown Prince of Austria, Hungary, Bohemia and Croatia when his father, Archduke Charles, acceded to the throne. However, in 1918, after the end of the First World War, the monarchies were abolished, the republics of Austria and Hungary were founded in their place, and the family was forced into exile in Madeira. Hungary did become a kingdom again, but Charles was never to regain the throne. Instead, Miklós Horthy ruled as regent until 1944, in a kingdom without a king.

Otto spoke German, Hungarian, Croatian, English, Spanish, French, and Latin fluently. In later life, he would write some forty books in German, Hungarian, French, and Spanish. His mother made him learn many languages because she believed he one day might rule over many lands.

== Years in exile ==
Otto was in the Gödöllő Palace during the Aster Revolution, but quickly evacuated from Hungary at the rise of republican sentiment. Otto's family spent the subsequent years at Wartegg Castle in Switzerland, and on the Portuguese island of Madeira, where 34-year-old Charles died in 1922, leaving the nine-year-old Otto pretender to the throne. On his father's deathbed, his mother, Empress Dowager Zita, told Otto, "your father is now sleeping the eternal sleep—you are now Emperor and King". The family eventually relocated to the Basque town of Lequeitio, where forty Spanish grandees bought them a villa.

Meanwhile, the Austrian parliament had officially expelled the Habsburg dynasty and confiscated all the official property via the Habsburg Law of 3 April 1919. Charles was banned from ever returning to Austria again, while Otto and other male members could return only if they renounced all claims to the throne and accepted the status of private citizens.

In 1935, he graduated with a doctorate in Political and Social Sciences from the University of Louvain in Belgium. His thesis was on "the right, born of usage and of the peasant law of inheritance, of the indivisibility of rural land ownership in Austria". In 1937 he wrote,

I know very well that the overwhelming majority of the Austrian population would like me to assume the heritage of the peace emperor, my beloved father, rather earlier than later ... The [Austrian] people have never cast a vote in favor of the republic. They have remained silent as long as they were exhausted from the long fight, and taken by surprise by the audacity of the revolutionaries of 1918 and 1919. They shook off their resignation when they realized that the revolution had raped their right to life and freedom. ... Such trust places a heavy burden on me. I accept it readily. God willing, the hour of reunion between the Duke and the people will arrive soon.

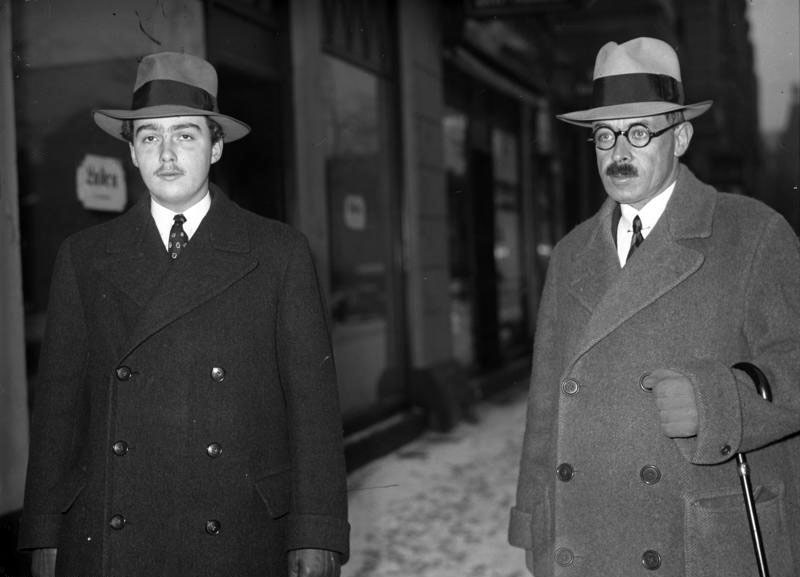
Otto von Habsburg (left) and Count von Degenfeld in 1933

He continued to enjoy considerable public support in Austria; from 1931 to 1938, 1,603 Austrian municipalities named Otto an honorary citizen. John Gunther believed that Zita was less popular among Austrians, however, writing in 1936 that "restoration would be a good deal closer if Otto's return would not mean also the return of his mother—to say nothing of hundreds of assorted and impoverished Habsburg cousins and aunts, who would flock to Vienna like ants to a keg of syrup". A greater obstacle, he wrote, was the opposition of Czechoslovakia and Yugoslavia, which feared that their people might want to rejoin a recreated monarchy.

== World War II ==
Otto denounced Nazism, stating:

I absolutely reject [Nazi] Fascism for Austria ... This un-Austrian movement promises everything to everyone, but really intends the most ruthless subjugation of the Austrian people ... The people of Austria will never tolerate that our beautiful fatherland should become an exploited colony, and that the Austrian should become a second-class citizen.

He strongly opposed the Anschluss, and in 1938 requested Austrian Chancellor Kurt Schuschnigg to resist Nazi Germany. He supported international intervention and offered to return from exile to take over the reins of government to repel the Nazis. According to Gerald Warner, "Austrian Jews were among the strongest supporters of a Habsburg restoration, since they believed the dynasty would give the nation sufficient resolve to stand up to the Third Reich".

Following the German annexation of Austria, Otto was sentenced to death by the Nazi regime; Rudolf Hess ordered that Otto was to be executed immediately if caught. As ordered by Adolf Hitler, his personal property and that of the House of Habsburg were confiscated. It was not returned after the war. The so-called "Habsburg Law", which had previously been repealed, was reintroduced by the Nazis. Otto's supporters, the leaders of the Austrian legitimist movement, were arrested by the Nazis and largely executed (Stefan Zweig's novella The Royal Game is based on these events). Otto's cousins Max, Duke of Hohenberg, and Prince Ernst of Hohenberg were arrested in Vienna by the Gestapo and sent to Dachau concentration camp where they remained throughout Nazi rule. Otto was involved in helping around 15,000 Austrians, including thousands of Austrian Jews, flee the country at the beginning of the Second World War.

After the German invasion of France in 1940, the family left the French capital and fled to Portugal. On 12 June, the Portuguese ruler António Salazar issued instructions to the Portuguese consulates in France to provide Infanta Maria Antónia of Portugal with Portuguese passports which would allow visas for her daughter Empress Zita and grandson Otto without violating Portuguese neutrality. The family resided in Cascais during their exodus. When the German authorities pressed Salazar for Otto's extradition from Portugal, Salazar offered to protect Otto, but asked him as a friend to leave the country. Otto left, and lived from 1940 to 1944 in Washington, D.C. In 1941, Hitler personally revoked the citizenship of Otto, his mother and his siblings, and the imperial-royal family found themselves stateless.

Otto was listed on the Nazi Sonderfahndungsliste G.B. ("Special Search List Great Britain"), and was the unofficial head of numerous resistance groups in Central Europe. These groups hated Nazi ideology and saw the resurgence of a Danube confederation as the only way for small states to exist between Germany and Russia. They championed the centuries-old Habsburg principle of "live and let live" among ethnic groups, peoples, minorities, religions, cultures and languages. These imperial resistance groups became embroiled in ferocious partisan warfare against Hitler, who profoundly hated the Habsburg family tradition. Many of these imperial resistance fighters (according to current estimates 4000–4500) were sent directly to concentration camps without trial, and over 800 were executed by the Nazis. Among them was Karl Burian, who was planning to blow up the Gestapo headquarters in Vienna, or Dr. Heinrich Maier, who passed on plans and production facilities for V-2 rockets, Tiger tanks, and Messerschmitt airplanes to the Allies. In contrast to many other German resistance groups, the Maier group was informed very early about the mass murder of Jews through its contacts with the Semperit factory near Auschwitz.

During his wartime exile in the United States, Otto and his younger brothers were in direct contact with President Franklin D. Roosevelt and the federal government. His efforts to create an "Austrian Battalion" in the United States Army were delayed and never implemented. However, he successfully convinced the U.S. to halt or limit the bombardment of Austrian cities, especially Vienna; due to this influence, bombardments on Vienna were delayed until 1943. Otto greatly desired Austria to be free, independent and democratic; he expressed concern that after the war the country was in danger of becoming a Soviet satellite state. Otto was commonly known in the U.S. as "Otto of Austria", and tried to keep his homeland and its neighbours in the minds of the people in the U.S. by influencing the U.S. Post Office to issue a series of stamps (the Overrun Countries series) featuring the German-occupied nations of Europe.

He obtained the support of Winston Churchill for a conservative "Danube Federation", in effect a restoration of Austria-Hungary, but Joseph Stalin put an end to these plans. Otto lobbied for the recognition of an Austrian government-in-exile, for the rights of the German-speaking population of South Tyrol, against the deportation of the German-speaking inhabitants of Bohemia and eastern Europe, and against letting Stalin rule Eastern Europe.

== After World War II ==
At the end of the war, Otto returned to Europe and lived for several years in France and Spain.

As he did not possess a passport and was effectively stateless, he was given a passport of the Principality of Monaco, thanks to the intervention of Charles de Gaulle in 1946. The Sovereign Military Order of Malta, of which he was a knight, also issued him a diplomatic passport. Later, he was also issued a Spanish diplomatic passport.

On 8 May 1956, Otto was recognized as an Austrian citizen by the provincial government of Lower Austria. The Austrian Interior Ministry approved this declaration of citizenship, but on the condition that he accept the name Dr. Otto Habsburg-Lothringen, on 8 February 1957. However, this only entitled him to a passport "valid in every country but Austria". Otto had already submitted a written statement, on 21 February 1958, that he and his family would renounce all former personal privileges of the House of Habsburg, but this did not satisfy the requirements of the Habsburg Law, which stated that Otto and other descendants of Charles could only return to Austria if they renounced all royal claims and accepted the status of private citizens. He officially declared his loyalty to the Republic of Austria on 5 June 1961, but this statement was ruled insufficient as well.

In a declaration dated 31 May 1961, Otto renounced all claims to the Austrian throne and proclaimed himself "a loyal citizen of the republic", "for purely practical reasons". In a 2007 interview on the occasion of his approaching 95th birthday, Otto stated:

This was such an infamy, I'd rather never have signed it. They demanded that I abstain from politics. I would not have dreamed of complying. Once you have tasted the opium of politics, you never get rid of it.

The Austrian administrative court found on 24 May 1963 that Otto's statement was legally sufficient. Upon his return to Austria, he and his wife were issued a Certified Proof of Citizenship on 20 July 1965. However, several political elements in the country, particularly the Socialists, were ill-disposed to welcoming back the heir of the deposed dynasty. This touched off political infighting and civil unrest that almost precipitated a crisis of state, and later became known as the "Habsburg Crisis". It was only on 1 June 1966, after the People's Party won an outright majority in the national election, that Otto was issued an Austrian passport, and was finally able to visit his home country again on 31 October 1966 for the first time in 48 years. That day, he travelled to Innsbruck to visit the grave of Archduke Eugen of Austria. Later, he visited Vienna on 5 July 1967.

== Political career ==
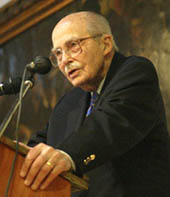
Otto von Habsburg giving a speech

An early advocate of a unified Europe, Otto was president of the International Paneuropean Union from 1973 to 2004. He served from 1979 until 1999 as a Member of the European Parliament for the conservative Christian Social Union of Bavaria (CSU) party, eventually becoming the senior member of the European Parliament. He was also a member of the Mont Pelerin Society. Habsburg was also part of the secretive conservative network Le Cercle during the cold war. He was a major supporter of the expansion of the European Union from the beginning and especially of the acceptance of Hungary, Slovenia, and Croatia. During his time in the European Parliament, he was involved in a fracas with fellow MEP Ian Paisley, a unionist Protestant pastor from Northern Ireland. In 1988, Pope John Paul II had just begun a speech to the Parliament when Ian Paisley, a vehement anti-Catholic, shouted and held up a poster reading "Pope John Paul II Antichrist". While other members threw papers and other objects at Paisley, Otto snatched Paisley's banner and, along with other MEPs and security personnel, roughed him up, punched him, tore his shirt, pulled on his tie, and ejected him head-first through the doors of the chamber, as the Pope looked on.

With others, he was instrumental in organising the so-called Pan-European Picnic at the Hungary-Austria border on 19 August 1989. This event is considered a milestone in the collapse of Communist dictatorships in Europe.

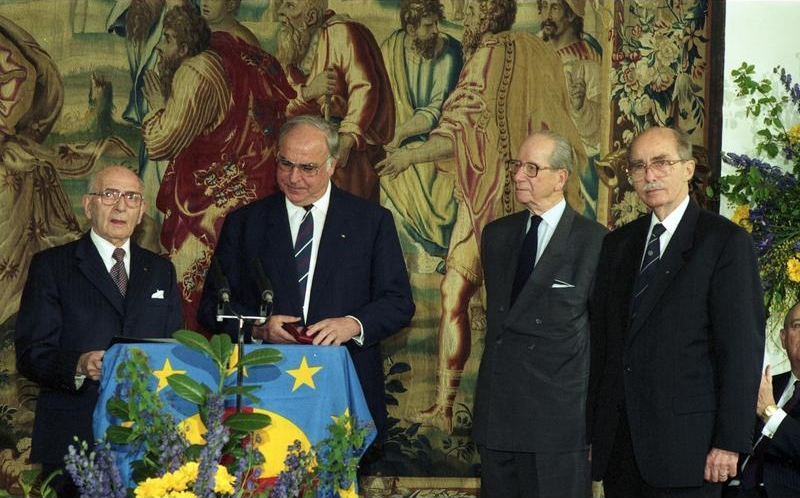
Otto (first right) with Helmut Kohl (third right) at the ceremony of the European Prize Coudenhove-Kalergi

In December 2006, he observed that, "The catastrophe of 11 September 2001 struck the United States more profoundly than any of us, whence a certain mutual incomprehension. Until then, the United States felt itself secure, persuaded of its power to bombard any enemy, without anyone being able to strike back. That sentiment vanished in an instant. Americans understand viscerally for the first time the risks they face." He was known as a supporter of the rights of refugees and displaced people in Europe, notably of the ethnic Germans displaced from Bohemia where he was once the Crown Prince. He was a jury member of the Franz Werfel Human Rights Award. He also held Francisco Franco in a high regard and praised him for helping refugees, stating that he was "a dictator of the South American type, not totalitarian like Hitler or Stalin".

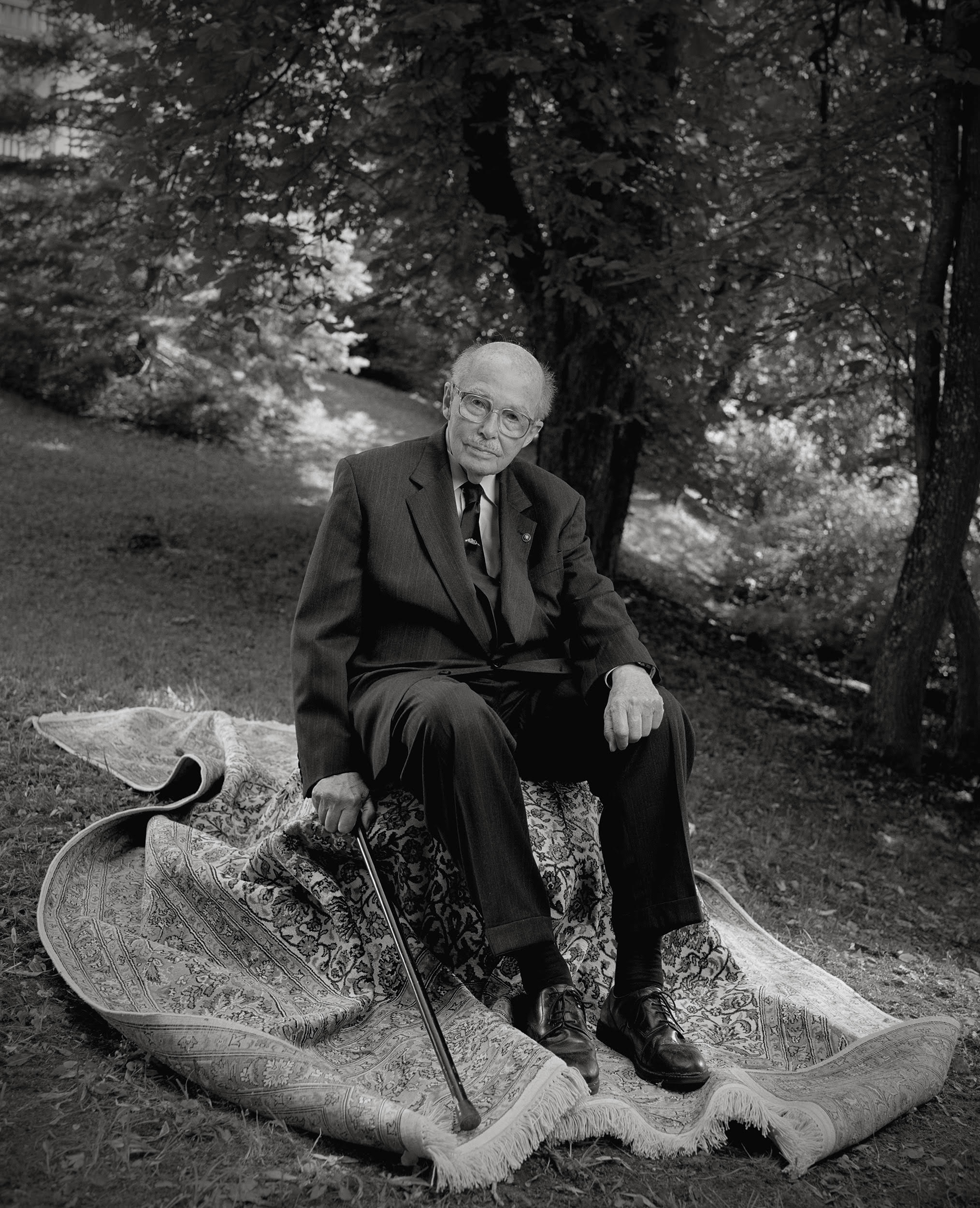
Otto in 2006

In 2002, he was named the first-ever honorary member of the European People's Party group.

Otto von Habsburg was an early critic of Russian President Putin. In a newspaper interview in 2002 and in two speeches in 2003 and 2005, he warned of Putin as an "international threat" that he was "cruel and oppressive" and a "stone cold technocrat".

== Criticism and controversy ==
At the end of 1998 Habsburg was targeted by criticism and the public prosecutor's office in Munich because he compared the allegations and calls for resignation against his son Karl Habsburg in connection with the World Vision donation affair with the Nazi persecution of the Jews:

Karl is attacked because he bears the certain yellow star, the name Habsburg. ... The poor Jews went through terrible things. I often think of them in this context.

Karl Habsburg's EU election campaign for the ÖVP in 1996 was partly financed - according to Habsburg without his knowledge - with donations from the Christian aid organisation World Vision Austria that were embezzled and diverted to the Paneuropean Union.

Otto's public advocacy for the weekly Junge Freiheit which was affiliated with the Neue Rechte, and for which he repeatedly made himself available as an interviewee, was met with criticism. As the first to sign two petitions initiated by the editors, he campaigned in 2002 against the background of a legal dispute against the then constitutional protection categorisation of the newspaper as "right-wing extremist" and in 2006 against its uninvitation at the Leipzig Book Fair.

In 2002, Habsburg said in an interview with Junge Freiheit that US domestic policy was split in two, namely a Department of Defense "filled with Jews" in key positions, "today a Jewish institution", on the one hand and one by "blacks, on the other hand". For example, Colin Powell and Condoleezza Rice "occupied" State Department. On the other hand, after the Habsburgs, the "Anglo-Saxons, i.e. the white Americans" played "hardly any role".

In November 2007, the Habsburgs commented on their position on Engelbert Dollfuss' coup. He "respected Dollfuss infinitely. The man was brave, ready to stand up for Austria to the last consequence. At that time I saw everything from this perspective: We have to preserve Austria". He also had "no" problem at all with the dissolution of parliament and the ban on parties and trade unions: "When it comes to the country, I'm ready for anything."

On the 2008 anniversary of the Anschluss, Otto von Habsburg made a statement as part of his "1938 Remembrance Day" address before Parliament that "there is no country in Europe that has a better claim to be a victim of the Nazis than Austria". Although his speech received an ovation, this received public protest, media criticism and disapproval voiced by Austrian politicians. Social Democratic Party Defence Minister Norbert Darabos was quoted as saying that the remarks were "unacceptable", "a veritable democratic-political scandal" and that he had "insulted the victims of National Socialism". Otto von Habsburg was also quoted as saying that "a discussion as to whether Austria was an accomplice or a victim is an outrage". Austrian People's Party military spokesman Walter Murauer defended Otto's statement at the time.

Murauer claimed that there was "another reality behind the mass of people who listened to Hitler on the Heldenplatz", meaning the "thousands in the resistance and thousands in prison waiting to be transported to Dachau" near Munich. Murauer also recalled that Engelbert Dollfuß had been the only head of government in Europe to have been murdered by the Nazis. Murauer advised Darabos "to avoid populist pot-shots against an honourable European of the highest calibre". Otto's son, Karl von Habsburg, also defended his father's words, in a 2011 statement, stating that "there were guilty parties in practically every country".

== Death and funeral ==
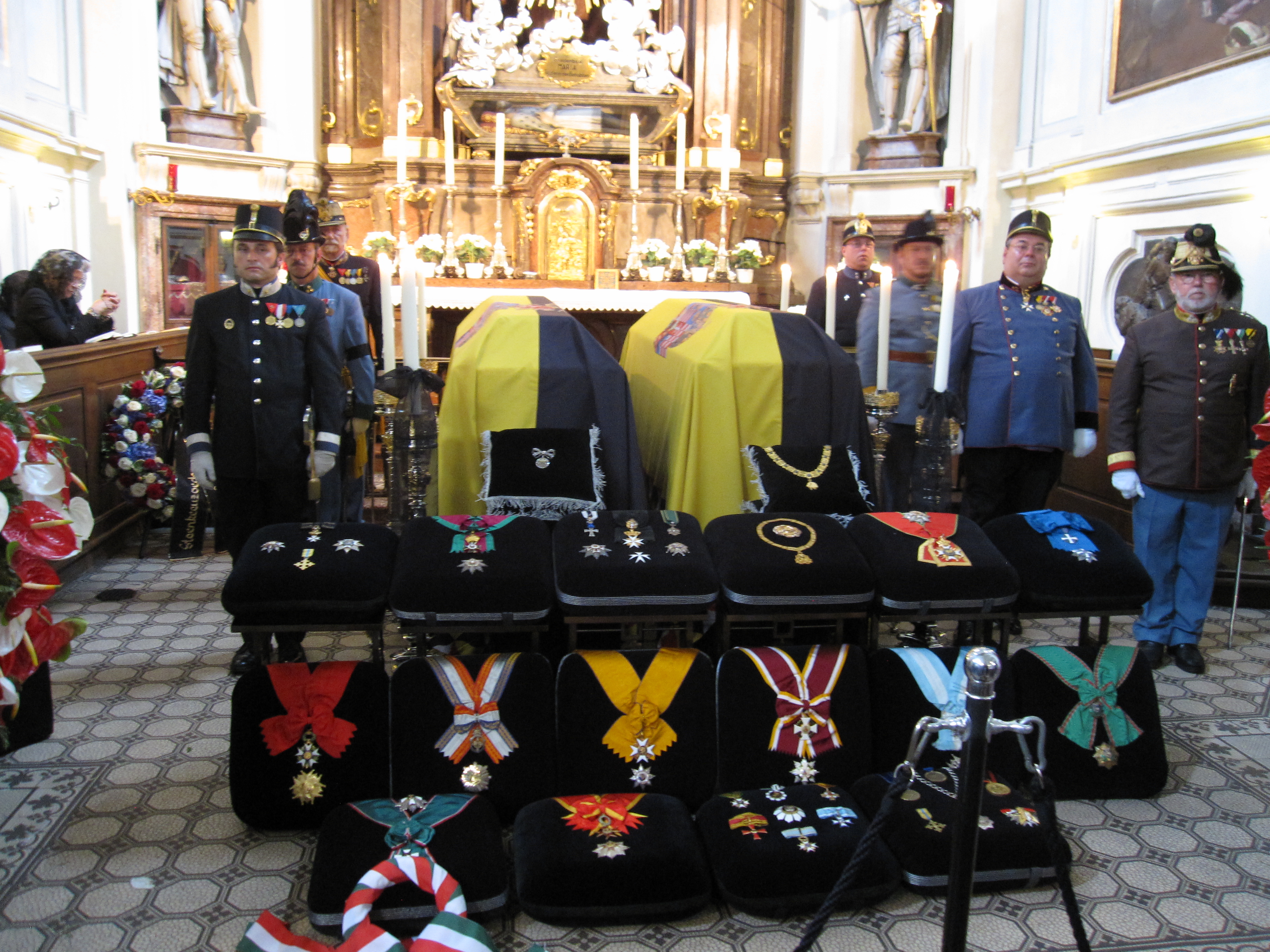
Otto and Regina lying in repose in the Capuchin Church, Vienna, draped with the Habsburg flag. The insignias of the various orders and decorations accumulated by Habsburg are on display. The guards of honour are dressed in Austro-Hungarian uniforms.

After the death of his wife, Regina, on 3 February 2010, Otto stopped appearing in public. He died at his home in Pöcking, on 4 July 2011, at the age of 98. His spokeswoman reported that he died "peacefully and without pain in his sleep". On 5 July, his body was laid in repose in the Church of St. Ulrich near his home in Pöcking, and a massive 13-day period of mourning started in several countries formerly part of Austria-Hungary. Otto's coffin was draped with the Habsburg flag decorated with the imperial–royal coats of arms of Austria and Hungary in addition to the Habsburg family coat of arms. In line with the Habsburg family tradition, Otto von Habsburg was buried in the family's crypt in Vienna, while his heart was buried in Pannonhalma Archabbey in Hungary.

== Family ==
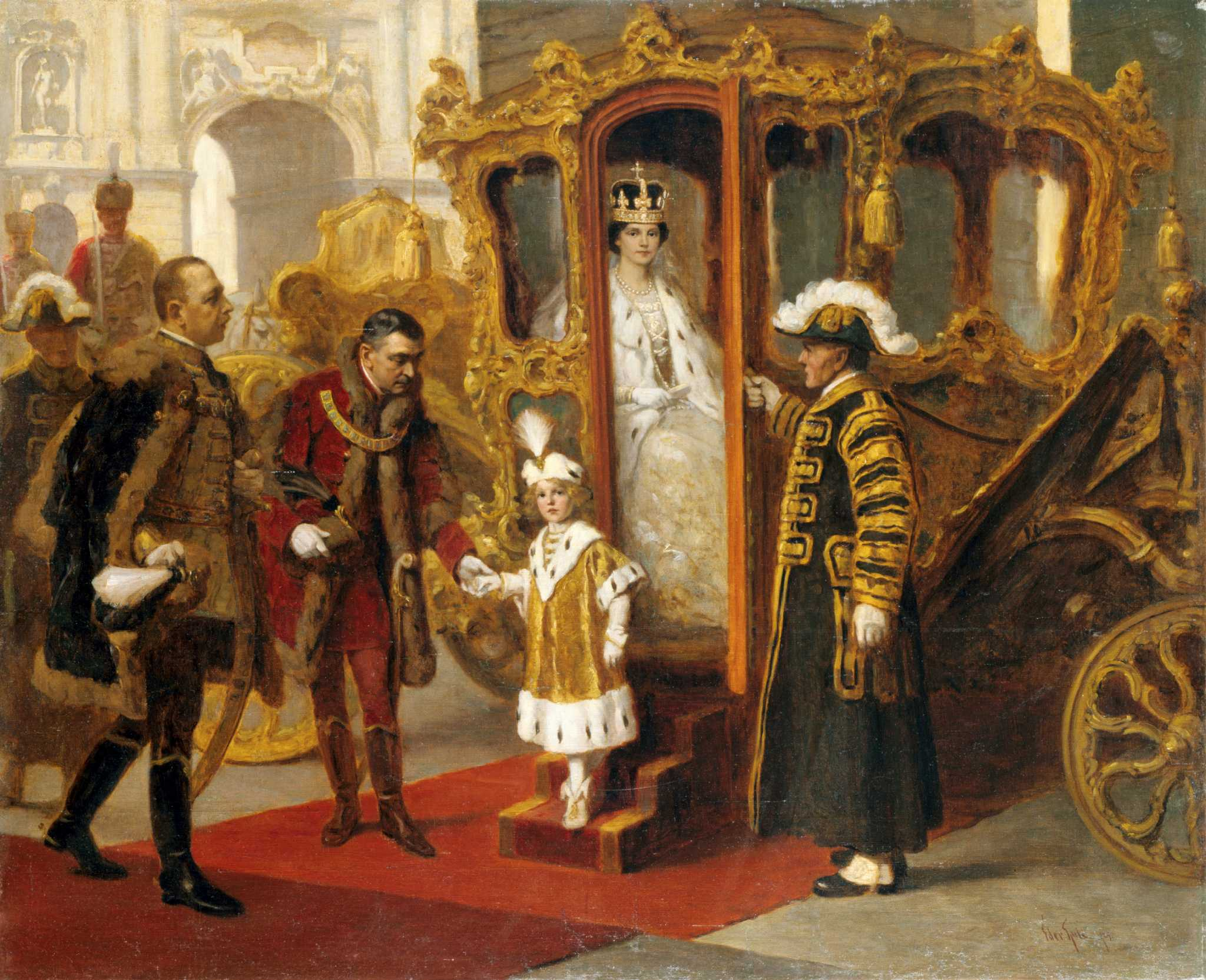
4-year-old Crown Prince Otto of Hungary in Budapest in 1916, attending his parents' coronation as King and Queen of Hungary, painted by Gyula Éder (inspired by a frame of the coronation film)

He married Princess Regina of Saxe-Meiningen on 10 May 1951 at the Church of Saint-François-des-Cordeliers in France. They were fourth cousins as both were descendants of Karl Ludwig, Prince of Hohenlohe-Langenburg and his wife Countess Amalie Henriette of Solms-Baruth. The wedding was attended by his mother, Empress Zita. He returned there with his wife for their golden jubilee in 2001. Otto lived in retirement at the Villa Austria in Pöcking near Starnberg, upon Starnberger See, Upper Bavaria, Bavaria, Germany.

At the time of his death in 2011, the couple had seven children, twenty-two grandchildren and two great-grandchildren:

- Andrea von Habsburg (born 30 May 1953), married Karl Eugen, Count of Neipperg (born 1951 in Schweigern). They have three sons and two daughters.
- Monika von Habsburg (born 13 September 1954), married Luis María Gonzaga de Casanova-Cárdenas y Barón, Duke of Santángelo and Grandee of Spain (born 1950 in Madrid), son of Balthasar de Casanova-Cárdenas y de Ferrer and María de los Dolores Barón y Osorio de Moscoso, Duchess de Maqueda, a descendant of Infanta Luisa Teresa of Spain, Duchess of Sessa, and sister of Francis, King-Consort of Spain. They have four sons.
- Michaela von Habsburg (born 13 September 1954, twin of Monika), married firstly Eric Alba-Teran d'Antin (born in Mexico City – 2004 in New York City), and secondly Count Hubertus von Kageneck (born 1940 in Wittlich), son of Count Franz Joseph von Kageneck and Princess Elisabeth Maria of Bavaria. Twice divorced, she has two sons and one daughter from her first marriage.
- Gabriela von Habsburg (born 14 October 1956), married Christian Meister (born 1954 in Starnberg). Divorced in 1997, they had one son and two daughters.
- Walburga von Habsburg (born 5 October 1958), married Count Archibald Douglas (born 1949 in Stockholm), a descendant of Ludwig I, Grand Duke of Baden. They have one son.
- Karl von Habsburg (born 11 January 1961), married (later divorced) Baroness Francesca Thyssen-Bornemisza (born 1958 in Lausanne), daughter of Baron Hans Heinrich Thyssen-Bornemisza and Fiona Frances Elaine Campbell-Walter. They have one son and two daughters.
- Georg von Habsburg (born 16 December 1964), married Duchess Eilika of Oldenburg (born 1972 in Bad Segeberg). They have one son and two daughters.

== Titles, styles and arms ==
Styles of Crown Prince Otto of Austria
- Reference style: His Imperial and Royal Highness
- Spoken style: Your Imperial and Royal Highness

- 20 November 1912 – 21 November 1916: His Imperial and Royal Highness Archduke and Imperial Prince Otto of Austria, Royal Prince of Hungary, Bohemia, Dalmatia, Croatia and Slavonia
- 21 November 1916 – 4 July 2011: His Imperial and Royal Highness The Crown Prince of Austria, Hungary, Bohemia, and Croatia

=== Titles in pretence from 1 April 1922 ===
- By the Grace of God Emperor of Austria; Apostolic King of Hungary, King of Bohemia, Dalmatia, Croatia, Slavonia, Galicia and Lodomeria; King of Jerusalem etc.; Archduke of Austria; Grand Duke of Tuscany and Cracow; Duke of Lorraine, Salzburg, Styria, Carinthia, Carniola and Bukowina; Grand Prince of Transylvania, Margrave of Moravia; Duke of Silesia, Modena, Parma, Piacenza, Guastalla, Auschwitz and Zator, Teschen, Friuli, Dubrovnik and Zadar; Princely Count of Habsburg and Tyrol, of Kyburg, Gorizia and Gradisca; Prince of Trent and Brixen; Margrave of Upper and Lower Lusatia and Istria; Count of Hohenems, Feldkirch, Bregenz, Sonnenburg etc.; Lord of Trieste, Kotor and the Windic March, Grand Voivod of the Voivodeship of Serbia etc.

=== Official in Austria ===
- 20 November 1912 – 21 November 1916: His Imperial and Royal Highness Archduke and Imperial Prince Otto of Austria, Royal Prince of Hungary, Bohemia, Dalmatia, Croatia and Slavonia
- 21 November 1916 – 1919: His Imperial and Royal Highness the Crown Prince of Austria, Hungary, Bohemia, Dalmatia, Croatia and Slavonia
- 8 February 1957 – 4 July 2011: Herr Doktor Otto Habsburg-Lothringen

=== Official in Croatia ===
- 21 November 1916 – 29 October 1918: His Royal Highness The Crown Prince of Croatia, Dalmatia and Slavonia

He became a citizen of the Republic of Croatia in 1990, with the official name:

- 1990 – 4 July 2011: Archduke Otto von Habsburg

=== Official in Germany ===
Otto von Habsburg became a citizen of the Federal Republic of Germany in 1978, and was allowed the official name:

- 1978 – 4 July 2011: Otto von Habsburg

=== Honours ===
==== Dynastic honours ====
- House of Habsburg-Lorraine:
  - Knight of the Austrian Imperial and Royal Order of the Golden Fleece, 1916; Sovereign, 1922
  - Sovereign of the Royal Hungarian Order of Saint Stephen
  - Sovereign of the Imperial and Royal Order of Leopold

==== Foreign honours ====
- Croatia: Grand Cross of the Grand Order of King Dmitar Zvonimir
- Estonia: Grand Cross of the Order of the Cross of Terra Mariana
- France: Grand Cross of the Order of the Legion of Honour, 31 October 2008
- Germany:
  - German Empire:
    - Bavarian Royal Family: Knight Grand Cross of the Royal Order of Saint Hubert
    - Ernestine Ducal Families: Knight Grand Cross of the Ducal Saxe-Ernestine House Order
  - Federal Republic of Germany: Grand Cross of the Order of Merit of the Federal Republic of Germany
    - Bavaria: Member of the Decoration of Merit
- Hungary: Grand Cross of the Order of Merit of the Republic of Hungary
- Italian Royal Family: Knight Grand Collar of the Royal Supreme Order of the Most Holy Annunciation
  - Two Sicilian Royal Family:
    - Knight Grand Cross with Collar of the Royal Order of Saint Januarius
    - Bailiff Knight Grand Cross with Collar of the Two Sicilian Royal Sacred Military Constantinian Order of Saint George
  - Parmese Ducal Royal Family: Knight Grand Cross of the Parmese Royal Sacred Military Constantinian Order of Saint George
- Kosovo: Recipient of the Medal of Liberty, Special Class
- Latvia: Commander of the Order of the Three Stars
- Lithuania: Commander of the Order of Grand Duke Gediminas
- Luxembourg: Knight Grand Cross of the Order of the Gold Lion of the House of Nassau
- Morocco: Knight of the Order of Military Merit
- Netherlands: Knight Grand Cross of the Order of the House of Orange
- Macedonia: Grand Cross of the Order of Merit
- Pakistan: Grand Officer of the Order of the Great Leader
- Portuguese Royal Family: Knight Grand Cross of the Royal Order of the Immaculate Conception of Vila Viçosa
- Rhodesia: Grand Cross of the Order of the Legion of Merit
- San Marino: Grand Cross of the Order of Saint Agatha
- Sovereign Military Order of Malta: Bailiff Knight Grand Cross of Obedience of the Sovereign Military Order of Malta, 2nd Class
- Spain:
  - Knight Grand Cross of the Order of Charles III
  - Knight Grand Cross of the Order of Africa
- Vatican: Honorary Knight Grand Commander of the Teutonic Order
  - Holy See:
    - Knight Grand Cross of the Order of Saint Gregory the Great
    - Knight Grand Cross of the Order of Saint Sylvester

=== Awards ===
- South Tyrol: Recipient of the Grand Order of Merit
- Badge of the Tyrolean Nobility Register

=== Non-governmental awards ===
- Paneuropean Union: Special Rank of the European Medal of the Paneuropean Union Germany
- Sudetendeutsche Landsmannschaft: European Charles Prize of the Sudetendeutsche Landsmannschaft

=== Academic awards ===
- Medal of the Académie des Sciences Morales et Politiques, Institut de France, Paris, France
- Medal of the Royal Moroccan Academy, Morocco
- Medal of the Academia da Cultura Portuguesa, Lisbon, Portugal
- Medal of the Real Academia de Ciencias Morales y Políticas, Madrid, Spain
- Honorary Professor of the University of Bogota, Colombia
- Honorary Fellow of the Hebrew University of Jerusalem
- Honorary Member of the Instituto de Estudos da Marinha, Portugal
- Honorary Senator of the University of Maribor, Slovenia
- Honorary Doctor of the University of Osijek, Croatia
- Honorary Doctor of the University of Nancy, Lorraine, France
- Honorary Doctor of the University of Turku, Finland
- Honorary Doctor of the University of Budapest, Hungary
- Honorary Doctor of the University of Pécs, Hungary
- Honorary Doctor of the University of Veszprém, Hungary
- Honorary Doctor of the Hebrew University of Jerusalem
- Honorary Doctor of the University of Ferrara, Italy
- Honorary Doctor of the University of Skopje, Macedonia
- Honorary Doctor of the University of Cincinnati, Cincinnati, Ohio, US
- Honorary Doctor of the University of Wisconsin–Milwaukee, Milwaukee, Wisconsin, US
- Honorary Doctor of the University of Tampa, Tampa, Florida, US
- Academician of Studium, Accademia di Casale e del Monferrato, Italy

== Bibliography ==
- Brook-Shepherd, Gordon (2007). Uncrowned Emperor: The Life and Times of Otto von Habsburg. A&C Black. ISBN 978-1852855499.
- Flavia Foradini, Otto d'Asburgo. L'ultimo atto di una dinastia, mgs press, Trieste, 2004. ISBN 8889219041Hatos, P. (2018). Az elátkozott köztársaság: az 1918-as összeomlás és az őszirózsás forradalom története.
- Hatos, P. (2018). Az elátkozott köztársaság: az 1918-as összeomlás és az őszirózsás forradalom története.
- Stefan Haderer, Otto von Habsburg (1912–2011): The Life of an Uncrowned Emperor, Royalty Digest Quarterly, Vol. 3/2011, Rosvall Royal Books, Falköping 2011
- Stefan Haderer, An Imperial Farewell: Funeral Ceremonies of Otto von Habsburg, Royalty Digest Quarterly, Vol. 4/2011, Rosvall Royal Books, Falköping 2011

Otto von Habsburg House of Habsburg-Lorraine Cadet branch of the House of Lorraine Born: 20 November 1912 Died: 4 July 2011
Titles in pretence
Preceded by Emperor-King Charles	— TITULAR — Emperor of Austria, King of Hungary, Bohemia, Croatia etc. 1 April 1922 – 1 January 2007; Reason for succession failure: Austro-Hungarian Empire abolished in 1918	Succeeded by Charles von Habsburg
Political offices
Preceded by Richard von Coudenhove-Kalergi	International President of the Paneuropean Union; 1973–2004	Succeeded by Alain Terrenoire
