= Pierre David (mayor) =

Belgian politician (1771–1839)

Burgomaster (mayor) of Verviers
- In office 1830 – 30 June 1839

Maire (mayor) of Verviers
- In office 4 July 1800 – 21 September 1808
- Succeeded by: Jean-Toussaint Rutten

Personal details
- Born: 9 January 1771 Verviers, Prince-Bishopric of Liège
- Died: 30 June 1839 (aged 68) Verviers, Belgium

Pierre David (9 January 1771 – 30 June 1839) was a Belgian civic official who was mayor of Verviers under French rule from 1800 to 1808; and after Belgian independence, from 1830 until his death. David's family were cloth-makers and he ran a weaving factory. He became involved in local government after serving as an officer in the city's police force. David, a Francophile and Republican, was appointed mayor of the city after the French annexation of the Prince-Bishopric of Liège. He resigned in 1808 after disagreeing with one of the Emperor Napoleon's decrees but remained involved in the running of the city. When Verviers was incorporated into the United Netherlands, David secured a seat on the city's Regency Council. During the 1830 Belgian Revolution, David supported independence for Belgium as a republic, but when this proved unachievable, he instead voted for union with France. David was subsequently appointed the first mayor of Verviers within the independent Kingdom of Belgium, holding this position until his death.

David was responsible for establishing the city's first fire brigade and creating a new cemetery to replace its inner-city burial ground. He also supported low-cost housing for workers, and established a secondary school and several charitable organisations. David played a key role in constructing the city's second river crossing and also planted numerous lime trees. After his death, he was memorialised in a fountain in the city centre, in which his heart was entombed. Several busts of David survive in the city and some of its streets are named after him.

== Early life ==
Pierre David was born on 9 January 1771 to Pierre David and Catherine-Joseph Jacob David. The David family was involved in cloth manufacture and the junior Pierre David maintained a factory with 26 looms that employed 20 workers. His brother Jean-Nicolas David maintained a factory at Lambermont, west of Verviers, that had 140 looms and 200 workers. Pierre David was noted for his loyalty during the 1789 Liège Revolution, in which rebels overthrew the Prince-Bishopric of Liège and established the Republic of Liège. After Austrian troops restored Prince Bishop César-Constantin-François de Hoensbroeck to the throne David was appointed by him as a second lieutenant in the Verviers police force. David was sworn in on 20 February 1792, at the same time as Jean-Nicolas who was appointed adjutant; they were assigned particular responsibility for the Brassine (brewery) district.

== Civic official ==
Liège was annexed by the French First Republic in 1795 and Verviers became part of the Ourthe department of France. David, a Francophile and supporter of the French Revolution, was appointed a municipal officer by the French authorities on 20 April 1799 and became maire (mayor) on 4 July 1800. David established a fire brigade in Verviers in 1802 and in 1808 supported the construction of low-cost housing for workers. After the establishment of the First French Empire decrees from Emperor Napoleon limited the freedom allowed to David as mayor. On 21 September 1808, he resigned the position. Succeeded by Jean-Toussaint Rutten, David remained a key adviser with a significant role in the management of the city.

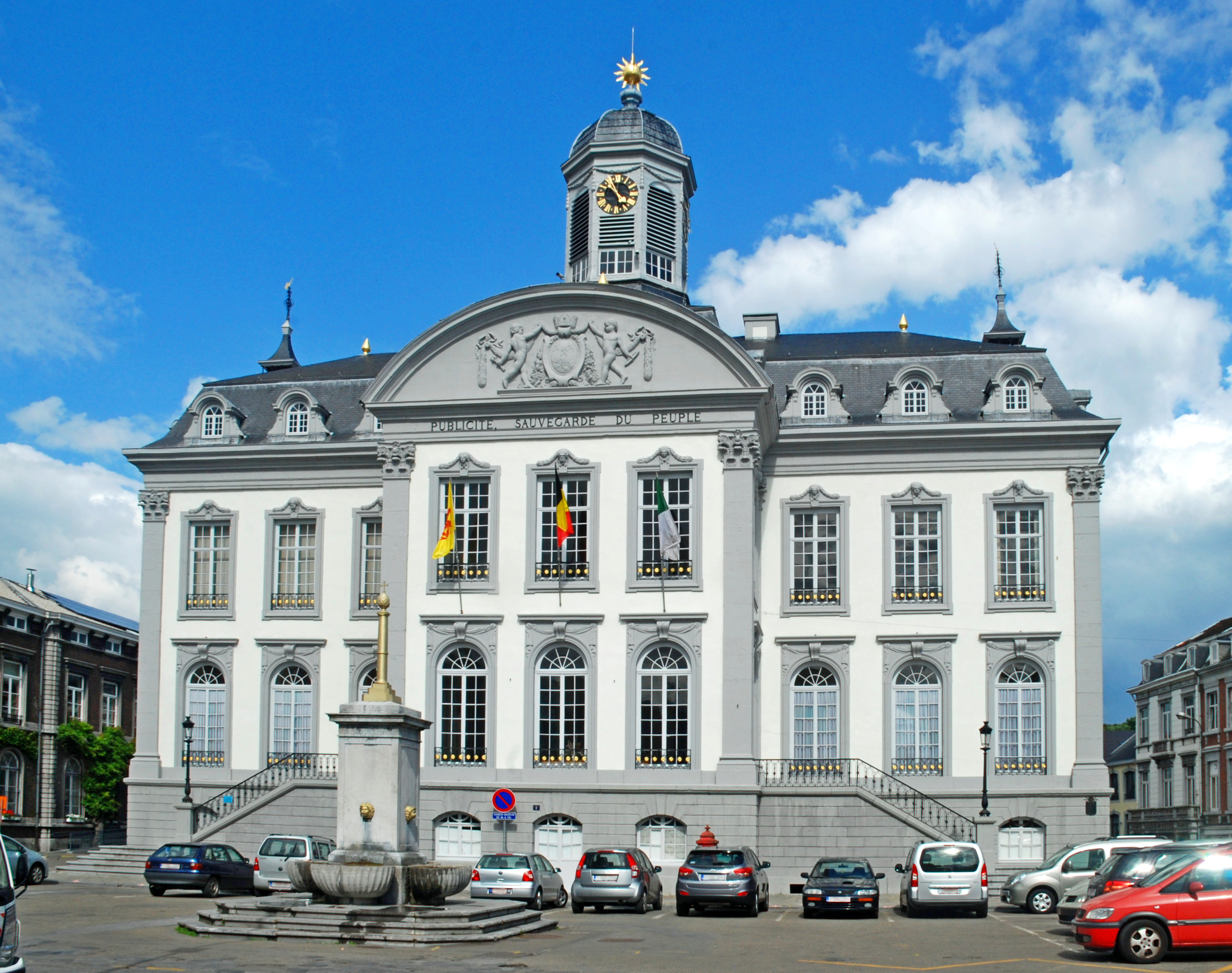
Verviers city hall

Verviers was captured by forces of the Sixth Coalition on 5 February 1814, as part of the campaign in north-east France. David was appointed by the coalition as a member of their commission d'arrondissement (council) for the area. The post-war Congress of Vienna, which concluded in 1815, stipulated that Belgium was to be incorporated into the new Kingdom of the Netherlands. Verviers was then governed by a Regency Council and David secured a seat on this body. In 1817 David closed the old church cemetery in the city and established a new cemetery on the outskirts. In 1830 Belgium began a revolution against Dutch rule. David, a supporter of the Belgian cause, was a member of the Commission of Public Safety. He was also a member of the National Congress; he was one of nine members who voted for the establishment of a Belgian republic and later voted for Belgium to be annexed to France. David was appointed the first burgomaster (mayor) of Verviers under the Kingdom of Belgium in 1830.

David played a key role in stabilising the city in the aftermath of the revolution, during which it had been damaged. He led a campaign to build a second bridge across the Vesdre, laying the foundation stone on 9 May 1832. The following year David received the royal visit of King Leopold I and his new Queen Louise-Marie. David survived local government reforms in 1836, securing re-election as a city councillor and being reappointed as mayor by Royal decree. During his time in office he established a secondary school as well as a number of charitable organisations and planted 53 lime (Tilia spp.) trees on the Promenade des Récollets to provide shade.

== Death and legacy ==
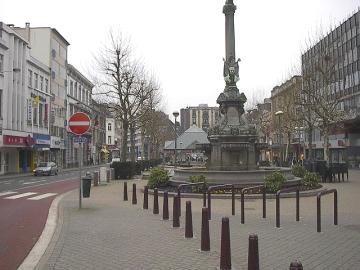
Fontaine David in Place Verte

David never married and lived with his sister on a 5-hectare (12-acre) farm within the city boundary. On 30 June 1839 David went into his hay loft to air it out. The door had swollen due to heavy rain and in trying to force it open the hinges broke and he fell through. David hit his head and died instantly. A large number of city residents went to the mortuary to view David's corpse. The Regency Council arranged David's funeral for 2 July at the Notre-Dame des Récollets and requested that local businesses release their workers at 4 pm to attend. After the service a funeral procession accompanied the body to the cemetery.

After his death, all three of the city's rival newspapers praised David, despite their differing political stances (liberal, conservative and republican). Prior to his burial, surgeons had reconstructed the broken bones in David's face to allow for a death mask to be made, which is now on display in the city museum. A portrait of David was commissioned from Laurent Olivier to hang in the city hall and is now also in the museum's collection. A bust by B Delbove is located in city hall. In 1843 David had a railway locomotive named after him and the city considered naming a new bridge in his honour, but opted to call it the Pont du Chêne (Oak Bridge) instead. David's brother named his son Pierre in his honour and Pierre's son was also named after David. Both men were involved in local and national government.

Three days after David's death, with his family's permission, his heart was removed with the intention of entombing it within a suitable memorial structure. It was preserved in a jar of alcohol within a zinc casket. Disagreements over the type of memorial and funding meant that the heart sat in storage at the city hall for four decades. A memorial fountain, the Fontaine David in the city's Place Verte, was designed by Clément Vivroux and inaugurated on 25 June 1883. The fountain underwent extensive renovation works in 2020 and on 20 August the heart was rediscovered. It was found within a hollowed stone near to a bust of David. Its zinc casket was found to be engraved with the text "The heart of Pierre David was solemnly placed in the monument on 25 June 1883" in French. The case was put on display at the city's Fine Arts Museum until 20 September.

In 1889, the 50th anniversary of his death, a medal commemorating David was struck. A number of streets in Verviers are named in David's honour.

== Bibliography ==
- Léon, Paul (1979). "Pierre David (1771-1839)" (PDF). Biographie Nationale. Vol. 41/13. Brussels: Royal Academy of Belgium.
- Joris, Freddy; Potelle, Jean-François (2009). Verviers: 250 ans de résistance, 1759-2009 (in French). Cerisier. ISBN 978-2-87267-133-5.
