= Letters of an Indian Judge to an English Gentlewoman =

1934 novel by Dorothy Black

- Author: Dorothy Black (Anonymously)
- Language: English
- Genre: Fictional correspondence
- Publisher: Lovat Dickson
- Publication date: 1934
- Publication place: England
- Pages: 255

Letters of an Indian Judge to an English Gentlewoman is a book of correspondence, in the form of letters, from Arvind Nehra, an Indian judge in colonial India. First published in 1934, this compilation of letters that were "unhindered by thoughts of public utterance". Nehra met the English woman, the wife of an English Colonel, at a party at Government House in Calcutta, after having recently returned from university in Cambridge. The author is then sent to Burma and he documents his time there, suffering all the racism that was ever present in colonial India towards the first half of the twentieth century. In Burma, he befriended his superior, and when with him, is treated to a life that he had known not since he had left England. He is able to attend the clubs whilst in this man's company, and is sometimes invited to make up a bridge four. Although, it eventually becomes apparent that he is only being treated kindly by the white ruling class when in this man's company, and when his superior leaves town for several days, he is again treated horribly.

== Authorship ==
This book was originally published by Lovat Dickson in 1934 who sold his publishing list in 1938 to Peter Davies Limited which was founded by Peter Llewelyn Davies, a cousin of Daphne du Maurier and a family friend of J. M. Barrie (Peter and his brothers were the 'originals' for Peter Pan and the Lost Boys). A Publishers' Note printed at the beginning of the book in the first edition and reprints by Lovat Dickson and Peter Davies states, referring to the letters, "The Publishers have satisfied themselves that they are genuine".

The British Library's on-line catalogue cites a Publisher's Note in later reprints by Futura 1978(1979) and Mandarin 1992 which mentions claims that the entire work is fiction without, however, endorsing the claims or naming the claimants. The aforementioned Publisher's Note identifies the author of the letters in this anonymous and frequently reprinted work are addressed as Dorothy Black (niece of Frederick Delius), a prolific novelist from 1916 to 1974, who had also written about life in Burma. She became much later a vice-president of the Romantic Novelists' Association.
