= Charles Angell Bradford =

British writer and historian (1864–1940)

- Born: 3 November 1864; England
- Died: 5 February 1940 (aged 75); England
- Occupations: Civil servant, historian
- Relatives: Joseph Bradford (great-grandfather)

Charles Angell Bradford FSA FRSL (3 November 1864 – 5 February 1940) was a British writer and historian.

== Life ==
Charles was born on 3 November 1864, the seventh child of Samuel and Sarah Bradford.

He passed an exam for the civil service in 1883.

He was elected a Fellow of the Royal Society of Literature in 1898 and was on their council from 1905.

In 1899, he was appointed as Assistant Superintendent in the Registry at the Home Office.

He was elected a Fellow of the Society of Antiquaries of London on 1 March 1900.

He died in February 1940, aged 75.

== Bibliography ==
- Eltham Palace (18??)
- On a window at Millom church (18??)
- The Lady Well, Lewisham (1896) OCLC 558614613
  - (2011 reprint) British Library, Historical Print Editions, pp30 ISBN 9781241317676
- Trinity Hospital, Greenwich, and its Founder. (1899) Blackheath OCLC 558614663
- Of allegory (1907) London LCCN a45001152 OCLC 558614633
- Ralph Rowlet, Goldsmith of London (1925) Kendal: T. Wilson & Son pp30 OCLC 558614636
- The Life of the Rev. Joseph Bradford (1932) Hunger pp48 OCLC 644464653
- Heart Burial (1933) London: George Allen & Unwin. pp256 LCCN 33031135 OCLC 10641494
  - (2005 reprint) ISBN 9780766192119
  - (2012 reprint) ISBN 9781162771816
- William Dodington: a tragedy of St. Sepulchre's, Holborn, in 1600 (1933) London: OCLC 26463044
  - Reprinted from Transactions of the London and Middlesex Archaeological Society,
    new series, vol. 3, part 1, 1933. pp9
- Nicasius Yetsweirt [d. 1586]:Secretary for the French Tongue (1934) Hunger pp12 OCLC 024300045
- Blanche Parry, Queen Elizabeth's Gentlewoman (1935) London : R.F. Hunger pp34 OCLC 021112871
- The Conway Papers ... (1936) pp256 OCLC 080945342
- Helena, Marchioness of Northampton (1936) London : G. Allen & Unwin, pp222 LCCN 36033726 OCLC 867881929
- Christopher Dodington, a Patron of St. Sepulchre's Church, Holborn (1937) OCLC 558614572
- Sanctuary at St. Sepulchre's, Holborn, circa 1499 (1936) London: OCLC 558614660
- Rowland Vaughan, an Unknown Elizabethan (1937) Heron pp17 OCLC 24331430
- Emanuel Lucar and St. Sepulchre, Holborn (1938) OCLC 558614579
- Hugh Morgan, Queen Elizabeth's Apothecary (1939) London : E. T. Heron & Co., pp30 OCLC 024310501
