= Heart-burial =

Type of burial in which the heart is interred apart from the body

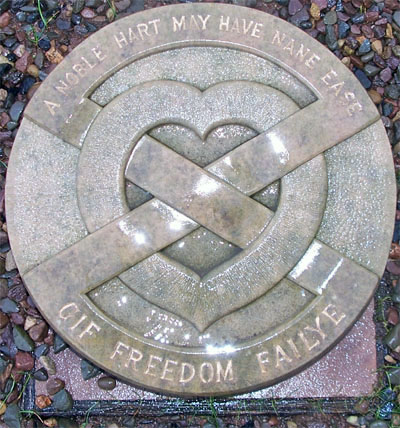
Modern marker for the site of the burial of the heart of Robert the Bruce at Melrose Abbey

Heart-burial is a type of burial in which the heart is interred apart from the body. In medieval Europe heart-burial was fairly common among the higher echelons of society, as was the parallel practice of the separate burial of entrails or wider viscera: examples can be traced back to the beginning of the twelfth century. Evisceration was carried out as part of normal embalming practices, and, where a person had died too far from home to make full body transport practical without infection, it was often more convenient for the heart or entrails to be carried home as token representations of the deceased. The motivation subsequently became the opportunity to bury and memorialise an individual in more than one location.

== Medieval ==
Notable medieval examples include:

- Otto the Great (d. 973), whose body was buried in Magdeburg separately from his entrails, which were interred at Memleben.
- Henry I (d. 1135), whose body was buried in Reading Abbey, but his heart, along with his bowels, brains, eyes & tongue, is interred at Rouen Cathedral in Normandy.
- Richard I (d. 1199), whose heart, preserved in a casket, was placed in Rouen Cathedral in Normandy.
- Saer de Quincy, 1st Earl of Winchester (died at Acre 1219), heart returned to Garendon Abbey and there interred.
- Eleanor of Castile (d. 1290), Queen of Edward I, whose body was interred in Westminster Abbey, but whose heart was buried at Blackfriars and her other viscera in Lincoln Cathedral
- Robert the Bruce (d. 1329), whose body lies in Dunfermline Abbey, but whose heart is at Melrose Abbey in Roxburghshire. He wished his heart to rest at Jerusalem in the church of the Holy Sepulchre, and on his deathbed entrusted the fulfilment of his wish to Sir James Douglas. The latter broke his journey to join the Spaniards in their war with the Moorish kings of Granada, and was killed in battle. He had kept the heart of Bruce enclosed in a silver casket hanging round his neck. The heart was subsequently recovered and buried in the Abbey.
- Ebrach Abbey, Germany, heart burials of the Bishops of Würzburg: beginning in the 13th century, the bishops of Würzburg had their hearts brought to the monastery in Ebrach (with their entrails going to the Marienkirche, and their bodies to Würzburg Cathedral). About 30 hearts of bishops, some of which had been desecrated during the German Peasants' War, are said to have found their final resting place at Ebrach. The prince-bishop Julius Echter von Mespelbrunn (d. 1617) broke with this tradition and had his heart buried in the Neubaukirche.

== Modern ==
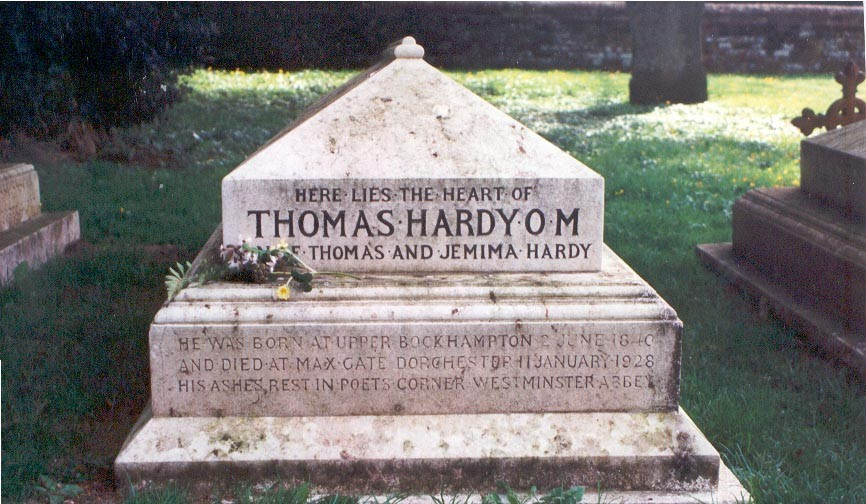
Burial site of Thomas Hardy's heart

More modern examples include:

- John II Casimir Vasa (d. 1672), King of Poland, heart buried at Abbey of Saint-Germain-des-Prés (of which he was latterly abbot), body interred at the Wawel in Kraków.
- Leopold Anton Eleutherius Freiherr von Firmian (d. 1744), Prince-Archbishop of Salzburg, had his heart buried in the chapel of Schloss Leopoldskron, the final palace he commissioned to be built in his lifetime, while his body was interred in the Salzburg Cathedral.
- Louis-Charles de France or Louis XVII (d. 1795), uncrowned claimant to the French throne, had his heart removed and placed in a crystal urn in the 1830s, after having been stored in distilled wine before that time. The urn eventually had its formal reburial in 2004 at St Denis Basilica.
- Maria Christina, Duchess of Teschen (d. 1798). She was buried in the Tuscan Vault of the Imperial Crypt in Vienna. Her heart was buried separately and is located in the Herzgruft, behind the Loreto Chapel in the Augustinian Church within the Hofburg Palace complex in Vienna.
- Peter I of Brazil and IV of Portugal (d. 1834). Requested that his heart should remain in the city of Porto (where he endured a siege between 1832 and 1833 in a war against his brother), while his remains were to be brought back to Brazil. However, only in 1972, on the 150th anniversary of Brazilian independence, were his remains returned, and interred in the Monument to the Independence of Brazil at Ipiranga.
- Pierre David (d. 1839), mayor of Verviers (initially in the United Netherlands, and afterwards in Belgium), whose heart was removed to be buried separately. Disagreements over type of memorial and funding meant that the heart sat in storage at the city hall for four decades before being interred in a fountain. The heart was rediscovered when the fountain underwent extensive renovation works in 2020.
- Frédéric Chopin (d. 1849), composer. Before his funeral, pursuant to his dying wish, his heart was removed. It was preserved in alcohol (perhaps brandy) to be returned to his homeland, as he had requested. His sister smuggled it in an urn to Warsaw, where it was later sealed within a pillar of the Holy Cross Church on Krakowskie Przedmieście, beneath an epitaph sculpted by Leonard Marconi, bearing an inscription from Matthew VI:21: "For where your treasure is, there will your heart be also." Chopin's heart has reposed there – except for a period during World War II, when it was removed for safekeeping – within the church that was rebuilt after its virtual destruction during the 1944 Warsaw Uprising. The church stands only a short distance from Chopin's last Polish residence, the Krasiński Palace at Krakowskie Przedmieście.
- John Crichton-Stuart, 3rd Marquess of Bute (d. 1900), scholar, art patron and Catholic convert. His heart was buried on the Mount of Olives in Jerusalem.
- Thomas Hardy (d. 1928), novelist and poet. His ashes were interred in Poets' Corner of Westminster Abbey, while his heart was buried in his beloved Wessex alongside his first wife. A recent biography of Hardy details the arguments over the decision, and addresses the long-standing rumour that the heart was stolen by a pet cat so that a pig's heart had to be used as a replacement.
- Queen Marie of Romania (d. 1938). She requested that her heart should be put inside the jewelry box, that she received from the Romanian noblewomen, when she arrived in Bucharest in 1893, as her first wedding gift from the Romanians, and be placed inside the Stella Maris Chapel at Balchik, her favorite residence. After the Treaty of Craiova and the subsequent occupation of Southern Dobruja by Bulgaria, the heart’s box was brought to Bran Castle, an estate she received as a gift from the people of Brașov after the Great Union. There, her youngest daughter, Princess Ileana, who had inherited the castle from her mother, built a copy of the Stella Maris Chapel and a marble crypt, inside the rock at the castle’s base, where she put the box. After the communists overthrew King Michael, the Royal Family was forced to leave the country, Ileana tried to take the heart into exile with her, but she couldn’t open the marble sarcophagus, thus the heart remained literally in the heart of Romania. In 1968, the director of the museum created after the castle’s nationalization, secretly opened the crypt and took the box to study it, until 1971 when the authorities discovered the desecration, and took the box to the National Museum of History where it remained until 2015. At the wish of the Royal Family, the heart was moved during an official ceremony to Pelişor Castle, and displayed in the Golden Room, where Queen Marie had died. The rest of her body was buried, according to her wish, inside the legendary Argeş Monastery, the necropolis of the Romanian Dynasty, near her husband’s resting place, King Ferdinand I.
- Ignacy Jan Paderewski (d. 1941), pianist, composer and third Prime Minister of Poland. His heart is encased in a bronze sculpture in the National Shrine of Our Lady of Czestochowa near Doylestown, Pennsylvania.
- Tsar Boris III of Bulgaria (d. 1943). In 1994, his heart was interred in the Rila Monastery. Due to several removals by different regimes, the main portion of his body has gone missing.
- Otto von Habsburg (d. 2011), former head of the House of Habsburg. His heart was buried at the Pannonhalma Archabbey in Hungary.

== Cultural references ==
In the 1994 movie Legends of the Fall, the character Samuel (Henry Thomas) is killed while serving in the Canadian Army in World War I. His brother (Brad Pitt) cuts the heart out of the body and sends it home to be buried on his father's ranch in Montana.

== See also ==
- Herzgruft; a burial chamber that protects 54 urns containing the hearts of members of the House of Habsburg.

== Bibliography ==
- Badham, Sally (2019). "Divided in death: the iconography of English medieval heart and entrails monuments". Church Monuments. 34: 16–76.
- Bradford, C. A. (1933). Heart Burial. London: Allen & Unwin.
- Dru Drury, Godfrey (1927). "Heart burials and some Purbeck marble heart shrines". Proceedings of the Dorset Natural History and Antiquarian Field Club. 46: 38–58.
- Dietz, Armin (1998). Ewige Herzen: Kleine Kulturgeschichte der Herzbestattungen. Munich: Medien & Medizin Verlag. ISBN 3-8208-1339-X.
- Hartshorne, Emily Sophia (1861). Enshrined Hearts of Warriors and Illustrious People. London: Robert Hardwicke.
- Léon, Paul (1979). "Pierre David (1771-1839)" (PDF). Biographie Nationale. Vol. 41/13. Brussels: Royal Academy of Belgium.
- Warntjes, Immo (2012). "Programmatic double burial (body and heart) of the European high nobility, c.1200–1400: its origin, geography, and functions". In Spiess, Karl-Heinz; Warntjes, Immo (eds.). Death at Court. Wiesbaden: Harrassowitz. pp. 197–259. ISBN 9783447067607.
- Weiss-Krejci, Estella (2001). "Restless corpses: secondary burial in the Babenberg and Habsburg dynasties". Antiquity. 75 (290): 769–80. doi:10.1017/S0003598X00089274. S2CID 161843486.
- Weiss-Krejci, Estella (2010). "Heart burial in medieval and early post-medieval central Europe". In Rebay-Salisbury, Katharina; Sørensen, Marie Louise Stig; Hughes, Jessica (eds.). Body Parts and Bodies Whole: changing relations and meanings (PDF). Studies in Funerary Archaeology. Vol. 5. Oxford: Oxbow Books. pp. 119–34. ISBN 978-1-84217-402-9.
- Westerhof, Danielle (2008). Death and the Noble Body in Medieval England. Woodbridge: Boydell & Brewer. ISBN 9781843834168.
