= Dorothy Black (novelist) =

British journalist and novelist

Dorothy Delius Allan Black MacLeish
- Born: Dorothy Delius Allan Black; March 27, 1890; Bradford, Yorkshire, England, UK
- Died: 1977 (aged 86–87); Scotland, UK
- Occupations: Novelist, journalist, writer
- Spouse: Hugh MacLeish
- Children: Yes
- Relatives: Frederick Delius (uncle); Clare Delius (mother)
- Writing career
- Pen name: Dorothy Black; Peter Delius
- Language: English
- Period: 1916–1974
- Genres: Romance, children's fiction
- Notable work: Letters of an Indian Judge to an English Gentlewoman

Dorothy MacLeish (née Black; 27 March 1890 – 1977) was a British journalist and writer of over 100 romance novels and several short stories from 1916 to 1974 under her maiden name Dorothy Black and as Peter Delius. In 1934 published anonymously Letters of an Indian Judge to an English Gentlewoman, later reedited under her name. She wrote her auto-biography "The Foot of the Rainbow" in 1960.

Dorothy Black was vice-president of the Romantic Novelists' Association.

== Biography ==
Born Dorothy Delius Allan Black on 27 March 1890 in Bradford, Yorkshire, England, UK, was the daughter of Clare (Edith) Delius (1866–1954), and her husband J. W. A. Black, her parents married in 1889. She was niece of the famous composer, Frederick Delius (1862–1934). Her mother wrote her brother's biography: Frederick Delius: Memories of my Brother.

She worked as a journalist. In 1916, she was married with Hugh MacLeish. Because of her husband's job, they moved to Rangoon, Burma (now also known as Myanmar), where she started to published fiction.

She raised her children in Burma. On 7 January 1921, she described Burma as "A Paradise for Women" in an article for the London Daily Mail. She also used Burma and India as inspiration to many of her novels. In 1934, Letters of an Indian Judge to an English Gentlewoman was published anonymously, later reedited under her name.

In the summer of 1949, she assisted Marion Crawford to write a series of features on life with Princess Margaret.

In 1960, she wrote her auto-biography "The Foot of the Rainbow".

She died in 1977 in Scotland, UK.

== Bibliography ==
=== As Dorothy Black ===
==== Single novels ====
- Her Lonely Soldier (1916)
- The Man with a Square Face (1916)
- Romance – The Loveliest Thing (1925)
- Idle Women (1928)
- Women Men Forget (1931)
- Amri Clare (1932)
- Wise Folly (1933)
- Someday I'll Find You (1934)
- The Loving Adventure (1934)
- The Broken Lute (1935)
- Love Came Late (1935)
- The Pineapple Garden (1935)
- The Spring Returns (1935)
- What No Man Knows (1935)
- Love in Exile (1936)
- All Love Excelling (1937)
- Corner House (1937)
- If I Should Lose You (1937)
- Summer's End (1937)
- If Sorrow Follows After (1938)
- Odd Job Man (1938)
- White Woman (1938)
- Lovers (1939)
- Dance, Little Lady (1940)
- First Love (1940)
- Never Leave Me (1941)
- Sailor, Sailor! (1941)
- My Love Belongs to Me (1942)
- Two for Mirth (1942)
- Burmese Picnic (1943)
- The Sun is Near (1943)
- Alone Am I (1944)
- Fantastic Journey (1944)
- The Gay Adventure (1945)
- Last Love (1946)
- The Hidden Heart (1947)
- Song before Dawn (1948)
- The Broken Moon (1949)
- The One I Love (1950)
- The Stag at Bay (1950)
- To Meet My Love (1950)
- We'll Meet Again (1951)
- Peacock Pie (1952)
- Well Done, Belinda! (1952)
- My Love for You (1953)
- The Blackthorn Winter (1953)
- Candles in the Dark (1954)
- Follow Your Heart (1954)
- Three Lame Men (1954)
- The Blue Orchid (1955)
- Her Heart was in the Highlands (1955) aka The Heart is Highland
- The House Without Doors (1955)
- The Trees Were Green (1955)
- Gentle Stranger (1956)
- Forsaking All Others (1956)
- The Uphill Road (1957)
- Afraid to Love (1958)
- Love Locked Out (1958)
- The Loveless Marriage (1958)
- The Long Day Done (1959)
- Where No Love Is (1959)
- Life with Money (1960)
- The Orange Robe (1960)
- The Unforgettable Miss Jones (1960)
- Hold in Your Keeping (1961)
- The Imprudent Princess (1961)
- The Quiet Waters (1961)
- Young Doctor Shannon (1961)
- In a Little Spanish Town (1962)
- A Sprig of Heather (1962)
- The Captain's Wife (1963)
- Paradise for Two (1963)
- When Love is True (1963)
- And Love Forever New (1964)
- As Long as You Need Me (1964)
- Return to Glenfern (1965)
- A Letter to My Love (1966)
- Sisters Three (1966)
- As Only Love Can Do (1967)
- Luxury Cruise (1967)
- O Come, My Love (1967)
- Wild Gold Rose (1967)
- The Winter Wind (1967)
- Love Endureth (1968)
- Mistress of Skula (1968)
- There is a Love for Everyone (1968)
- Make This My Home (1969)
- Midsummer Magic (1969)
- Love Must be Wise (1969)
- One Day in Spring (1969)
- I Will Remember (1970)
- Romantic Stranger (1970)
- Heritage of Love (1971)
- Love Belongs to Everyone (1972)
- Flower of the Snow (1973)
- Where Love is (1974)
- From Faraway (1974)
- It Had to be You (1974)

==== Children's books ====
- The Magic Egg (1922)

==== Omnibus ====
- Merry Times With Louis Wain (1916)
- Adventures in Magic Land and Other Tales (1917)

==== Non-fiction ====
- The Foot of the Rainbow (1961)

==== Short stories ====
- What All the World Is Seeking (1925)
- It's Difficult for Girls! (1926)
- The Girl with Painted Lips (1927)
- The Captains and the Kings Depart (1927)
- Passing the Love of Women (1927)
- East Is East (1928)
- The Desert's Dusty Face (1928)
- Jacobs Ladder (1928)
- In the House of Wa Lee (1928)
- His Wonders to Perform (1929)
- The Gift (1929)
- I Kiss Your Hand, Madam (1929)
- Prisoners of Love (1930)
- Unborn To-Morrow (1930)
- Sedition (1931)
- Besieged at Christmas (1932)
- A Knight Came Riding By (1933)
- This for Remembrance (1933)
- Where We Are All Spoiled Darlings (1934)
- Where There's a Will (1934)
- Goodbye, Summer (1934)
- Such Folk are Dangerous (1934)
- Daphne Demurs (1935)
- The Hungry Man (1935)
- Babes in the Wood (1935)
- Love and Guile (1935)
- Queer Bedfellows (1935)
- Mr. Charrabandi's Assistant (1936)
- Something in the Wind (1937)
- Little Singing Bird (1940)
- Love Your Neighbor (1940)
- The Fantastic Armada (1940)
- Love a la Mode (1941)
- The Sowers Went Forth (1943)
- Another Woman (1943)
- The Hidden Heart (1946)
- My Heart Flies Homing (1946)
- Solo for Flute (1949)
- Home is the Sailor (1949)
- Men Are Naturally Dangerous (1952)
- The Goose and the Gendarme (1954)
- House Without Doors (1954)
- Gentle Stranger (1955)
- The Loveless Marriage (1956)
- Love's Old Sweet Song (1957)
- Life with Money (1958)
- Luck of the Draw (1960)
- The Old Dog (1962)

=== As Peter Delius ===
==== Single novels ====
- Women in white (1934) aka Nursing Home
- Boarding House (1935)
- Love of Women (1940)
- The last affair (1964)

=== Anonymously ===
==== Single novels ====
- Letters of an Indian Judge to an English Gentlewoman (1934)
