= Enitan Bereola II =

American writer

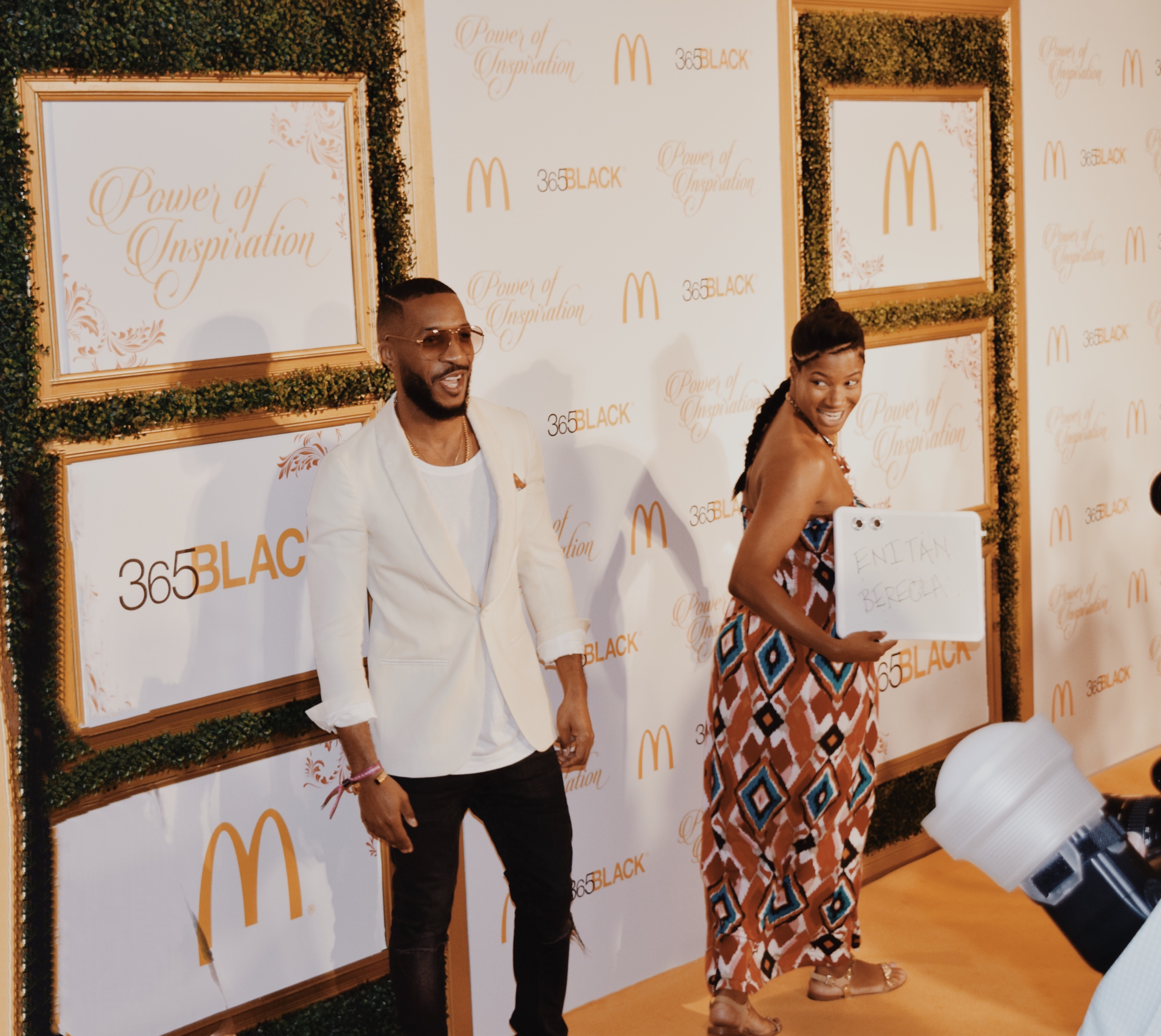
- Enitan Bereola II
- Born: Enitan O. Bereola II; February 8, 1982 (age 44); San Jose, California
- Education: Information technology
- Alma mater: Florida Agricultural and Mechanical University
- Occupations: Author, entrepreneur
- Writing career
- Language: English
- Genres: Lifestyle, etiquette
- Notable works: Gentlewoman: Etiquette for a Lady, from a Gentleman

Enitan O. Bereola II (born February 8, 1982) is a Nigerian American author, entrepreneur and public speaker based in San Jose, California.

== Biography ==
Bereola was born to Enitan (Olu) Bereola and Gwendolyn Toney, in San Jose, California, in 1982. He completed his early education at Piedmont Hills High School. He attended Florida Agricultural and Mechanical University where he studied computer information systems and Business marketing. Bereola started writing at the age of 25. He is a three-time best-selling author, celebrity ghostwriter, former columnist at Soul Train and contributor to Essence Magazine for relationship advice columns. Bereola is currently Co-founder and Creative director at SAINT MILES®, a sanctuary for colorful brands. Enitan is Founder at The Bereolaesque Group, a creative branding and publishing company based in Greater Los Angeles Area. He is married and currently resides in Oakland, California.

== Career ==
Bereola authored his first book, Bereolaesque: The Contemporary Gentleman & Etiquette Book for the Urban Sophisticate, in 2009. The book was published by AuthorHouse and debuted in the Top 5 on iTunes self improvement book list in 2009. The book also became an Amazon Kindle bestseller of 2009. In 2013, Bereola published his second book, Gentlewoman: Etiquette for a Lady, from a Gentleman. The book explores the demise of femininity and class in contemporary society. Gentlewoman attributes commentaries from New York Times best-selling author Hill Harper. The book also features contribution from prominent celebrities including Meagan Good, Grammy Award winner Michelle Williams and Bryan-Michael Cox. Gentlewoman became a bestseller in America and one of the top translated bestsellers in Lithuania. In December 2016, Bereola published his third book The Gray: A Relationship Etiquette Study. The book is the study of relationships and is inspired by true events. The Gray debuted as fine art at Art Basel in Miami Beach. Bereola has also contributed to Letters to an Incarcerated Brother: Encouragement, Hope, and Healing for Inmates and Their Loved Ones by Hill Harper, published in 2013, Revival by Angela Benton, published in 2017 and The Mind of a Winner by Steve Canal with contributions from Daymond John, Barbara Corcoran, Grammy award winner 2 Chainz and Kenny Smith, also published in 2017. In 2010, Bereola produced a short film, This Time directed by Academy Award winning director Matthew A. Cherry featuring NAACP Awards winning actresses Terri J. Vaughn and Reagan Gomez-Preston.

Bereola was awarded with The Power 30 Under 30 Award by Porsche in 2011. He has also received BC Award for Greatness in Literature. He was selected as Black Enterprise Magazine Young & Bold Business Leader in 2013. Bereola has been an invited keynote speaker and panelist at multiple educational institutes including Harvard University, Stanford University and Tufts University. He has also appeared on multiple nationally broadcast TV and radio channels including Fox News, NBC Niteside, Centric, TV One with Roland Martin and KMEL.

== Books ==
- Bereolaesque: The Contemporary Gentleman & Etiquette Book for the Urban Sophisticate (2009)
- Gentlewoman: Etiquette for a Lady, from a Gentleman (2013)
- The Gray: A Relationship Etiquette Study (2016)
