= Galitzine =

Galitzine is an alternative romanization of Golitsyn, a surname chiefly associated with members of the House of Golitsyn of Lithuanian-Russian origin.

Notable people with the surname include:

== House of Golitsyn ==
- Alexandra Pavlovna Galitzine (1905–2006), Russian princess
- Irene Galitzine (1916–2006), Russian-Georgian fashion designer
- Maria Galitzine (1988–2020), Russian interior designer
- Maria-Anna Galitzine (born 1954), Belgian Catholic activist
- Mstislav Galitzine (1899–1966), Russian prince
- Tatiana Galitzine (born 1984), American-born architectural designer and UNICEF activist
- Vladimir Galitzine (1884–1954), chairman of the Russian Society of Support to Russian Emigrants in England

== Other people ==
- Nicholas Galitzine (born 1994), British actor

== See also ==
- Gallitzin (disambiguation)
- Golitsyn (disambiguation)
- Category:Golitsyn family
