= Death and funeral of Otto von Habsburg =

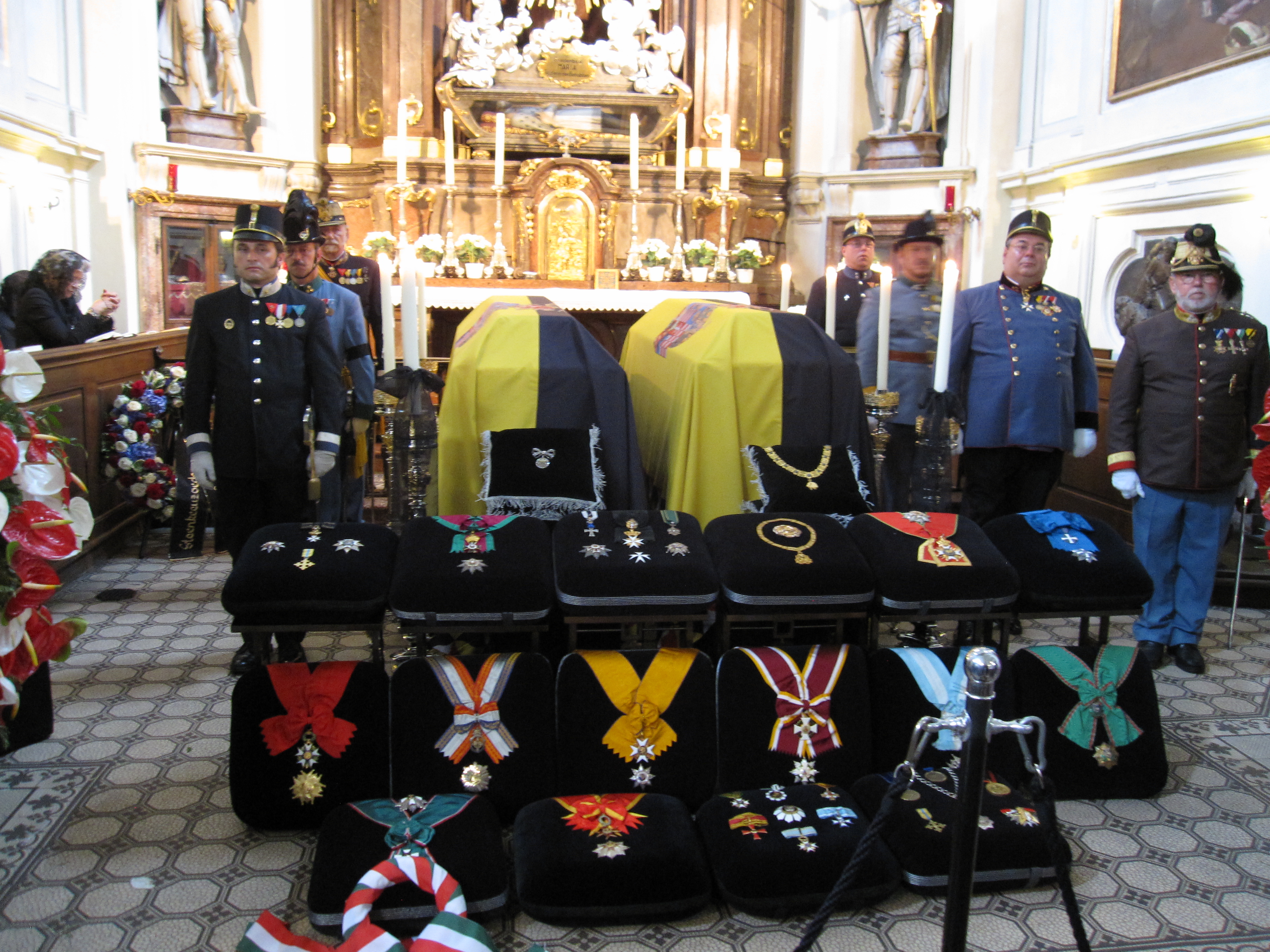
Archduke Otto of Austria and his wife Princess Regina of Saxe-Meiningen lying in repose in the Capuchin Church, Vienna, draped with the Habsburg flag. The insignias of the various orders and decorations accumulated by Habsburg are on display. The Guards of Honour are dressed in Austro-Hungarian uniforms.

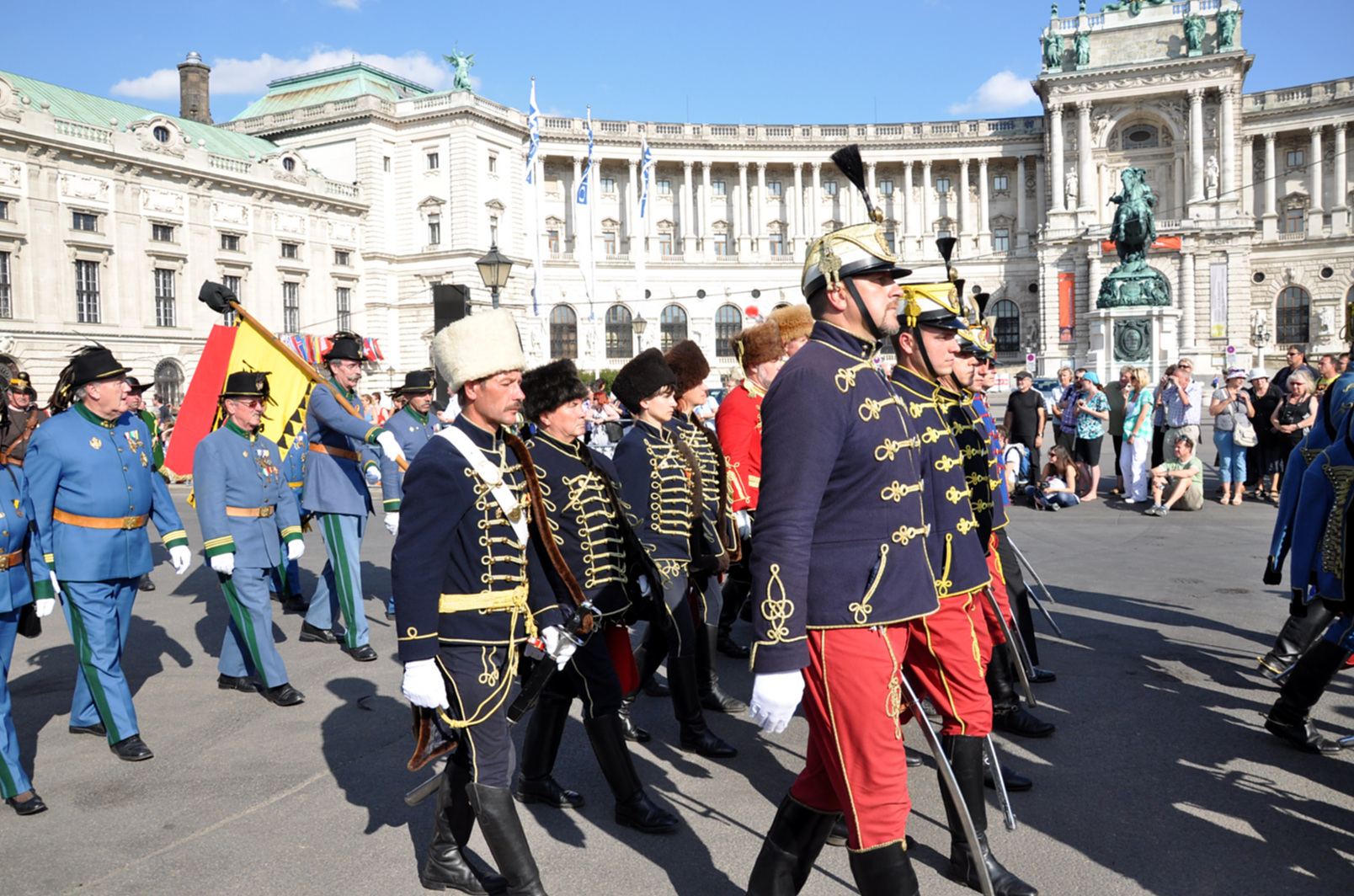
Funeral procession passing the Heldenplatz (uniforms: Austro-Hungarian Hussars and Imperial Riflemen)

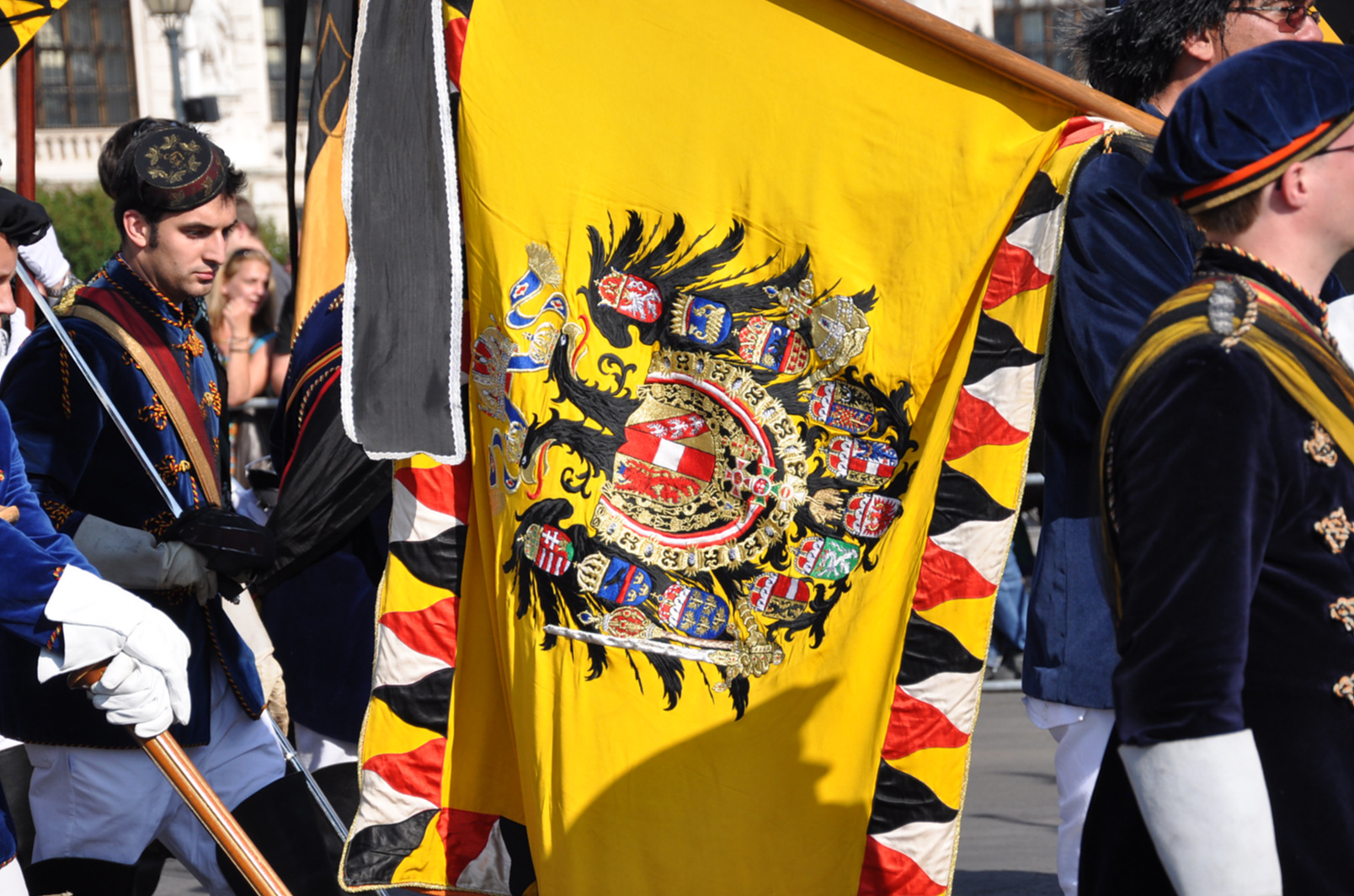
Banner displaying the Imperial & Royal Coat of Arms, with those of the Kronländer

On 4 July 2011, Otto von Habsburg, also known as Otto of Austria, former head of the House of Habsburg-Lorraine and Sovereign of the Order of the Golden Fleece (1922–2007), and former Crown Prince (1916–1918) and Emperor-King (from 1922) of Austria-Hungary, died at 98 years old.

The following day, a 13-day period of mourning started in several countries formerly part of Austria-Hungary. Otto was entombed in the Imperial Crypt under the Capuchin Church in Vienna on 16 July and his heart buried in Pannonhalma Archabbey in Hungary on 17 July. Multiple requiems were celebrated. Many foreign dignitaries—among them reigning or former monarchs King Carl XVI Gustaf of Sweden, Henri, Grand Duke of Luxembourg, King Michael I of Romania, Tsar Simeon II of Bulgaria, Hans-Adam II, Prince of Liechtenstein, and Fra' Matthew Festing, Prince and Grand Master of the Order of Malta—attended the Requiem Mass in Vienna's St. Stephen's Cathedral on 16 July, presided over by Cardinal Christoph Schönborn, which was followed by the entombment in the Imperial Crypt. Commemorations were also held in Bavaria.

This was the most recent burial of a royal Habsburg in the Imperial Crypt—following a centuries-old ceremony—where 145 other members of the House of Habsburg, among them many Holy Roman Emperors and Austrian Emperors, have been entombed since 1633. (Note: Otto was the penultimate person to be buried in the Imperial Crypt, because the Crypt is almost full. After Otto's entombment, there is only one remaining place, which is reserved for Archduchess Yolande of Austria, the wife of his brother who was buried there in 2008. Yolande was born in 1923, when Austria-Hungary no longer existed.)

Around 1,000 invited guests and 100,000 members of the public attended the funeral in Vienna, which was broadcast live by Austrian Television. A funeral procession over one kilometer long brought Otto's coffin from St. Stephen's Cathedral to the Imperial Crypt. The ceremonies led to large parts of central Vienna being closed down for public traffic.

The funeral has been described as the "last Emperor's funeral" to take place in Vienna.

== Reaction ==
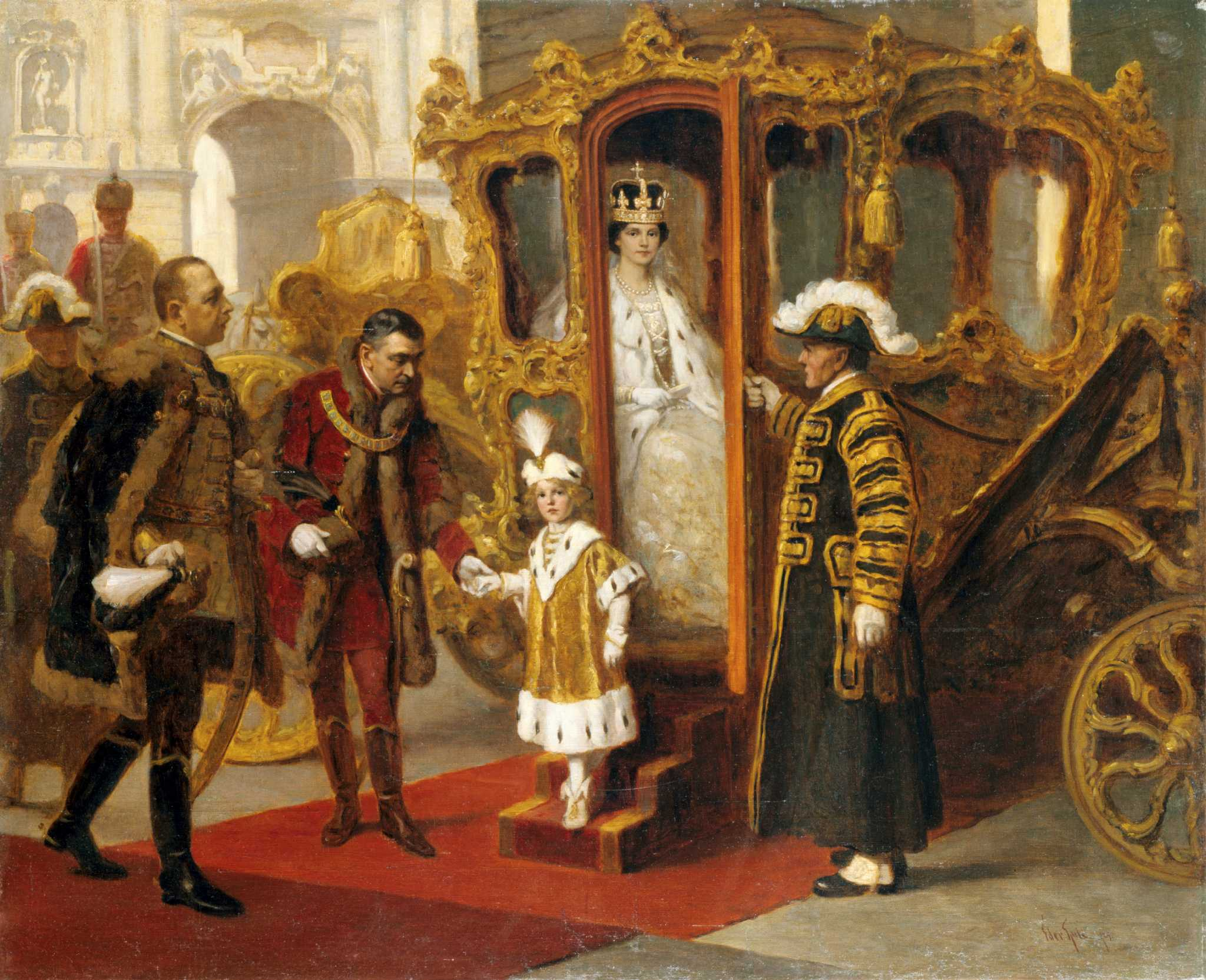
Crown Prince Otto in Budapest in 1916, attending his parents' coronation as King and Queen of Hungary. Painted by Gyula Éder (inspired by a frame of the coronation film).

The eldest son of Charles I, the last Emperor of Austria and King of Hungary, and his wife, Zita of Bourbon-Parma, Otto was born as third in line to the thrones of Austria, Hungary, Croatia and Bohemia. With his father's ascent to the thrones in 1916, he was himself likely to become the Emperor. As his father never abdicated, Otto was considered by himself, his family and Austro-Hungarian legitimists to be the rightful Emperor-King. Forced to live in exile with his family after 1918, Otto was active on the Austrian and European political stage from the 1930s, as an early proponent of European integration and a fierce opponent of Nazism and communism. After the Second World War, he was Vice President (1957–1973) and President (1973–2004) of the International Paneuropean Union, and served as a Member of the European Parliament. He played a central role in the revolutions of 1989, as a co-initiator of the Pan-European Picnic. Later he was a strong supporter of the EU membership of central and eastern European countries.

He has been described as "the last Emperor" or "the last Habsburg".

Supranational bodies

EU – European Commission President José Manuel Barroso said, "with Otto von Habsburg, a great European has left us who gave an important impetus to the European project throughout his rich life. ... [His] commitment to Europe should set a political example for all of us, especially in difficult times." In his statement, Barroso pointed out that Otto had "made a central contribution to the opening of the Iron Curtain and the peaceful reunification of our continent that had been divided for too long".

The President of the European Parliament, Jerzy Buzek, stated: "This morning, a European giant passed away [...] In the darkest hours of our continent, Otto von Habsburg has been a rock of truth and humanity. He resisted Nazism with the same determination he opposed the Communist regimes of the Eastern bloc. He kept the flame of hope for the reunification of Europe alive when many others had given up. I will never forget the moment when the Paneuropean Picnic, which Otto von Habsburg organised on 19 August 1989 at the Austro-Hungarian border, cut the first holes in that Iron Curtain of shame."

The European Parliament held a minute of silence in honour of Otto von Habsburg.

European People's Party – President Wilfried Martens said: "Otto von Habsburg was a great European. He relentlessly defended the European project and European integration".

European People's Party Group – Chairman Joseph Daul stated: "Otto von Habsburg embodied the history of European integration like no-one else. The son of the last Austro-Hungarian emperor fought all his life for democracy, freedom, and an understanding of the peoples of Europe. From the beginnings of the movement for European integration following the end of World War II until the now-famous Paneuropean picnic on the border between Austria and Hungary in 1989, he succeeded in overcoming borders and showing Europeans a way forward to a common future."

Unrepresented Nations and Peoples Organization – The UNPO secretary-general Marino Busdachin praised Otto as "a champion of multi-culturalism and European integration."

Paneuropean Union – Bernd Posselt, chair of the Paneuropean Union in Germany, said Otto was "the last grand architect of European unity from the pioneer generation." Zoltán Wodianer-Nemessuri, chair of the Paneuropean Union in Hungary, stated: "He deserves undying respect in Hungary (for doing) by far the most to ensure that the 1956 Hungarian Uprising should not fade from public memory".

States

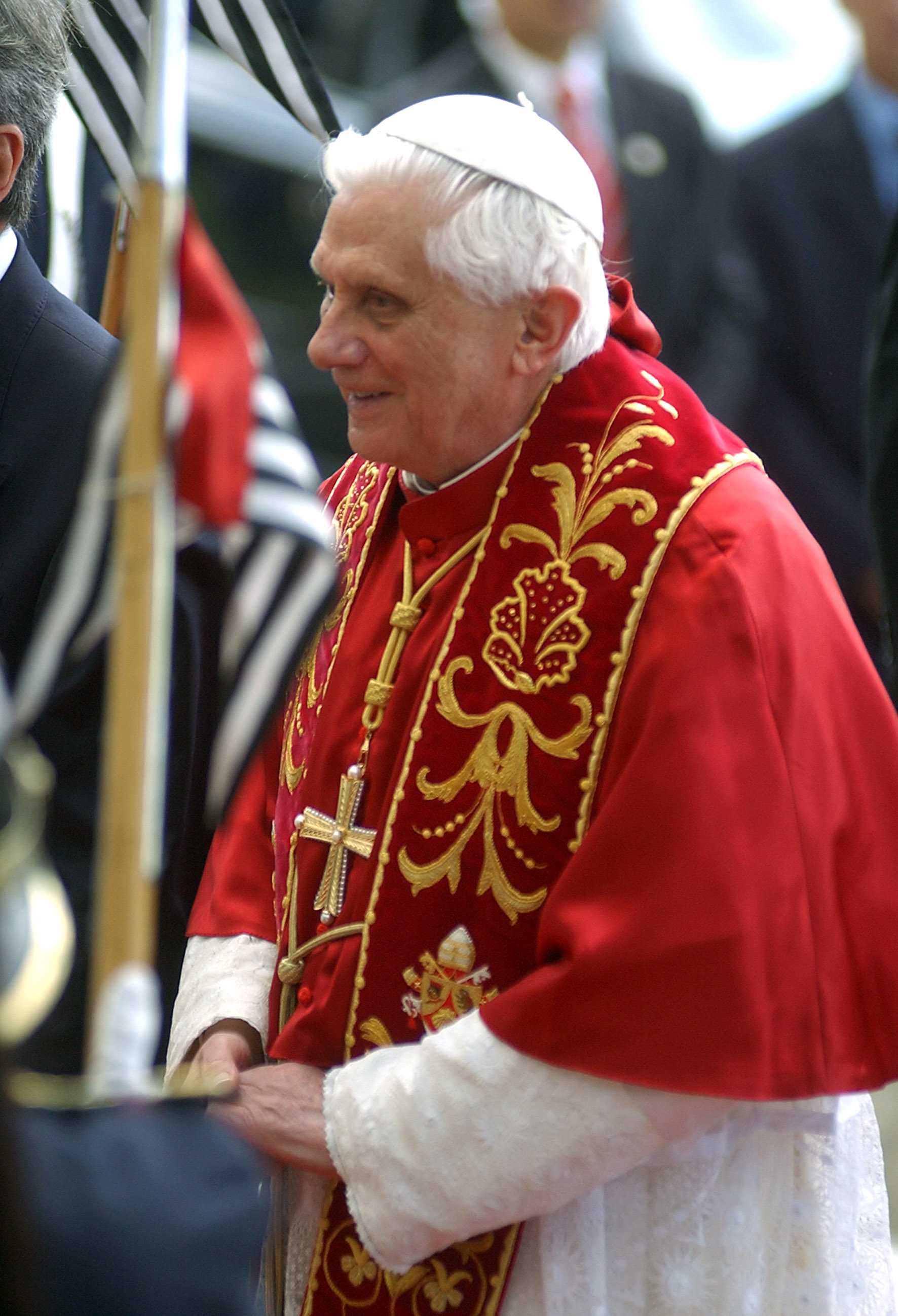
Pope Benedict XVI stated that Otto was "a great European" who worked tirelessly for peace, the coexistence of peoples and a just order in Europe

Holy See – In a telegram addressed to Karl von Habsburg, Archduke of Austria, Pope Benedict XVI offered his condolences to the House of Habsburg. Benedict praised Otto von Habsburg as "a great European" who had worked tirelessly for peace, the coexistence of peoples and a just order in Europe. "In the hour of grief over this tragic loss, I associate myself with you and the entire imperial family in prayer for the deceased. In a long and fulfilling life, Archduke Otto was a witness to the eventful history of Europe," the Pope wrote. Cardinal Renato Martino remembered Otto as one of the twentieth century's "greatest defenders" of the Catholic faith and human dignity, stating that his father, "Blessed Karl of Austria, instilled in him from an early age that the office of a ruler is one of holy service and selfless sacrifice for the good of the peoples entrusted to him. It was a philosophy that would influence him all his life." Cardinal Christoph Schönborn said that "Otto von Habsburg was without doubt one of the really great Europeans," and that he should be regarded as one of the "architects of the European idea and of European integration" together with Robert Schuman, Konrad Adenauer, and Alcide De Gasperi. Schörnborn regretted that it had taken so much time for Austria to show "the reasonable gratitude towards the House of Habsburg, which Austria owes so incredibly much" and whose "political and cultural heritage we consume today."

Hungary – As the news emerged about Otto's death in Budapest, Hungarian lawmakers immediately held a minute of silence in parliament. The President of Hungary, Pál Schmitt, and the Prime Minister of Hungary, Viktor Orbán, both sent their condolences to the Habsburg family. An official government statement said that "his staunch support for the Hungarian cause and for Hungarian people brought him universal recognition and popularity in our country".

Austria – Austrian president Heinz Fischer labeled Otto a "loyal citizen of the republic of Austria". Despite the fact that his family was forbidden to enter Austria until Otto formally renounced his claim to the throne, the president noted that his relationship with the republican government "had developed well in the last decades". Chancellor Werner Faymann said that "his life reflects the great turning points of the Austrian and European history."

Former Chancellor of Austria Wolfgang Schüssel said that Otto was "a convinced European and paved the way for Austria's road to Europe", and that he "internalized like no other person the all-European idea and articulated it already at a time when there was still a dark shadow over the continent." Othmar Karas, leader of the European Parliament delegation of the Austrian People's Party, said that "all of Europe is crying."

Czech Republic – Foreign Minister Karel Schwarzenberg praised Otto, stating that Otto had "courageously fought for the peoples imprisoned behind the Iron Curtain." Schwarzenberg remarked that Otto was the last person who had had a constitutional position "in the old Monarchy", stating that "we should never forget that he was the Crown Prince of Austria, Hungary, and Bohemia." Schwarzenberg also praised Otto's strong anti-Nazi stance, stating that the fact that the annexation of Austria was codenamed "Operation Otto", meant that "the Nazis knew Otto was their main enemy".

Slovenia – President Danilo Türk said: "Otto von Habsburg was one of the strongest advocates of a united Europe, a great man and a promoter of human freedom."

Latvia – Foreign Minister Ģirts Valdis Kristovskis sent his condolences to the German Foreign Minister, saying Habsburg's "involvement of spreading European democracy and the European idea will be remembered in Latvia."

North Macedonia – President Gjorge Ivanov sent his letter of condolences to the Habsburg family, stating that Otto von Habsburg was a "friend of the Republic of North Macedonia" and that "he never forgot about North Macedonia."

Kosovo – President Atifete Jahjaga sent her condolences to the Habsburg court, stating that "with deep sorrow I heard the news of the death of his Majesty Archduke Otto von Habsburg. Today, Europe has lost a prominent politician, the great proponent of peace and a contributor to its union, while Kosovo has lost an irreplaceable friend who will be considered and remembered forever. On this painful occasion, on behalf of the Republic of Kosovo and its citizens, and on my personal behalf, I express my most heartfelt condolences and my deepest sympathy to the Court of Habsburg."

Croatia – Foreign Minister Gordan Jandroković sent his condolences to the Habsburg family, and described Otto as "a great political role model, a great European and a relentless promoter of human rights." He said that the Croatian people always had a great friend in Otto and that he will be especially remembered for his involvement and contribution to the international recognition of the Republic of Croatia, as well as for his support to Croatia's membership in the European Union.

Domestic

Germany – Member of Parliament and President of the Federation of Expellees Erika Steinbach praised Otto as "a strong supporter of the refugees and a compassionate intermediary between the peoples of Europe".

Bavaria – The ruling Christian Social Union of Bavaria, the party which Otto represented as a MEP, issued a statement, stating, "the CSU mourns the death of His Imperial and Royal Highness Dr. Otto von Habsburg." Prime Minister Horst Seehofer lauded Otto as "an advocate for Europe, a defender of freedom, and of the faith and our values." He also mentioned Otto's role in bringing down the Iron Curtain.

== Funeral ==
His funeral took place on 16 July 2011 in Vienna and on 17 July in Pannonhalma Archabbey, Hungary. A 13-day period of mourning started in several countries formerly part of Austria-Hungary on 5 July 2011, when the body of Archduke Otto was laid in repose in the Church of St. Ulrich near his home in Pöcking, Bavaria. The body was transferred by train to the Catholic pilgrimage basilica in Mariazell on 12 July, before being transferred by train to Vienna. Requiem Masses were celebrated in three countries, in Munich, Pöcking, Mariazell, Vienna, and Budapest. In accordance with the Habsburg tradition, his body and heart were buried separately. Otto was entombed in the Imperial Crypt (Kapuzinergruft) together with his mother, wife and other family members. His heart was buried in Pannonhalma Archabbey in Hungary. Crown Prince Otto was educated by monks from Pannonhalma Benedictine College. He was exiled from Austria and Hungary in 1918.

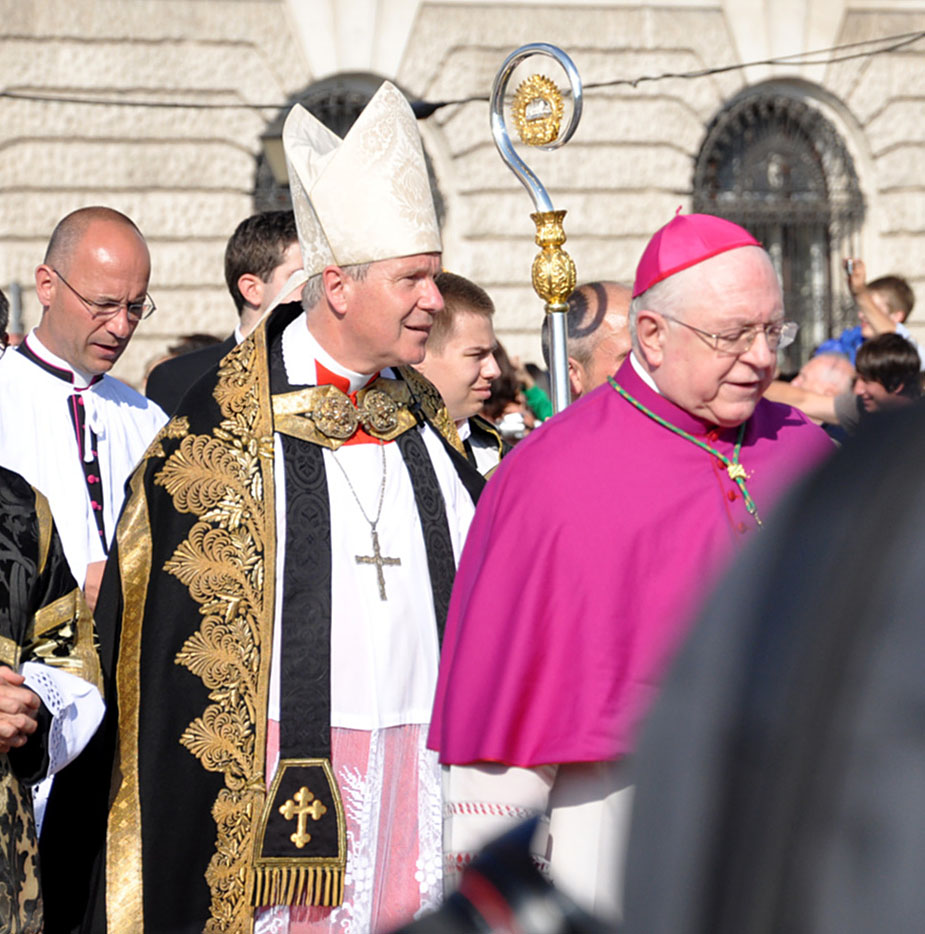
Cardinal Christoph Schönborn and the papal nuncio, Archbishop Peter Zurbriggen, during the funeral procession

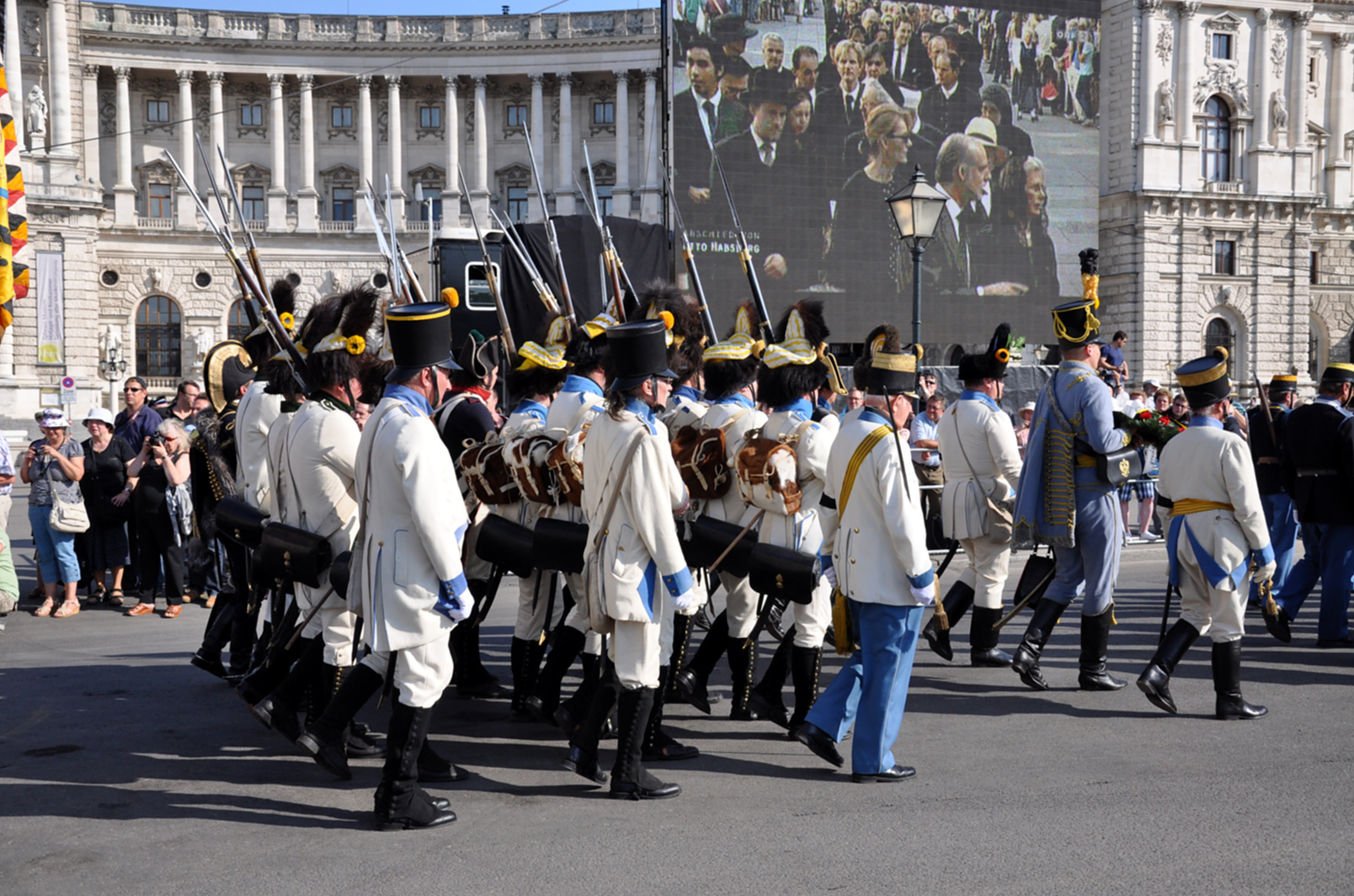
Funeral procession at Heldenplatz with big screen in the background

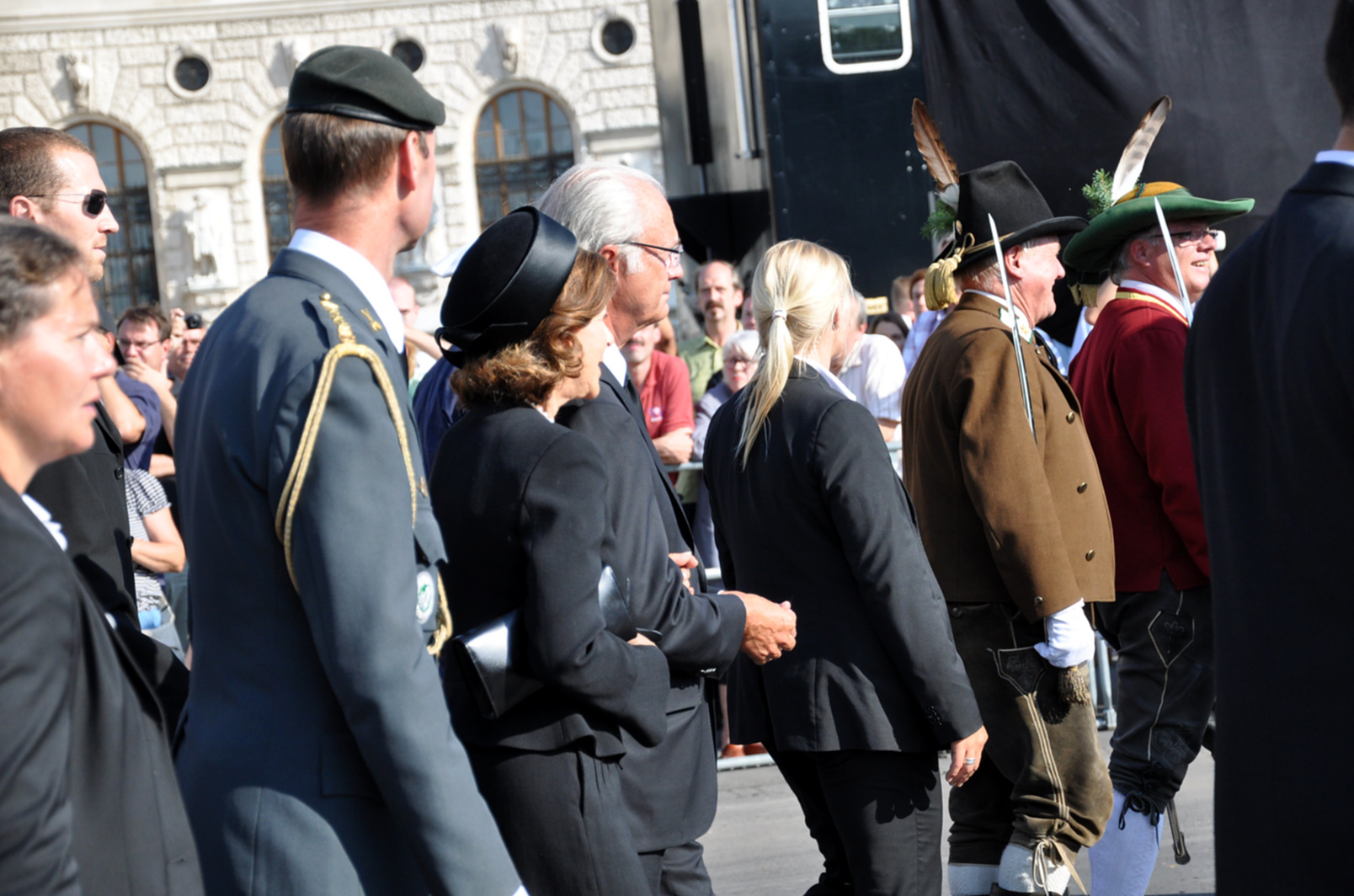
The King and Queen of Sweden during the procession

The funeral has been described as a major event in Vienna's history; Cardinal Schönborn described it as "a historic moment for Austria", stating that it will be good for the country to "think of this great Habsburger in prayer and gratitude". Otto's mother, former Empress-Queen Zita's funeral in 1989, was attended by 40,000 people.

Otto was buried with military honours. The funeral in Vienna was broadcast live by Austrian Television and the requiem was also screened on big screens at Stephansplatz. The funeral procession through Innere Stadt was over one kilometer long. Following the procession, Otto was entombed in the Imperial Crypt. A blessing from Pope Benedict XVI was read during the requiem.

Otto was the penultimate person to be entombed in the Imperial Crypt, where 145 other members of his family have been entombed since 1633, because the Crypt is almost full.

In Bavaria, the ruling Christian Social Union of Bavaria organised the largest commemorations in the state since the death of its former Prime Minister Franz Josef Strauss; the commemorations included the celebration of two requiems and a reception at the Munich Residenz.

Otto's coffin was draped with the Habsburg imperial flag in black-yellow and featuring the imperial-royal coats of arms of Austria and Hungary in addition to the Habsburg family coat of arms.

Otto von Habsburg wrote that the funeral of Franz Joseph I of Austria in 1916 had been the most profound experience of his childhood; the 4-year-old had attended the funeral dressed completely in white among all the adults dressed in black.

Otto's funeral was organised by his sons, Karl von Habsburg, head of the House of Habsburg, and Georg von Habsburg. Karl von Habsburg revealed that the planning for the funeral had started 12 years earlier, and that Otto had not involved himself in it, except for expressing the wish for a ceremony in Hungary in line with the family tradition.

The Imperial Crypt of the Habsburg family is each year visited by around 200,000 people. The Crypt was constructed in accordance with the will of Empress Anna.

The sarcophagus of Otto's wife Regina, who was interred in her family crypt in the castle of Veste Heldburg in Germany in 2010, was transferred to Mariazell and then to the Imperial Crypt in Vienna at the same time. However, Regina's heart will remain in her family crypt in Veste Heldburg.

The security measures were reportedly massive. Large parts of central Vienna were closed down for public traffic. The small Austrian Green Party criticized the government for the extensive state involvement in the funeral, which made it indistinguishable from a state funeral in their opinion.

The funeral was said to have nourished Austria's important tourist industry; according to a study, the imperial Habsburg heritage is the main reason tourists visit the country.

The Malteser Hospitaldienst Austria (MHDA), an organisation which is subordinated to the Order of Malta, was responsible for providing medical assistance.

=== Requiems and ceremonies ===
Six requiems in four countries were celebrated.

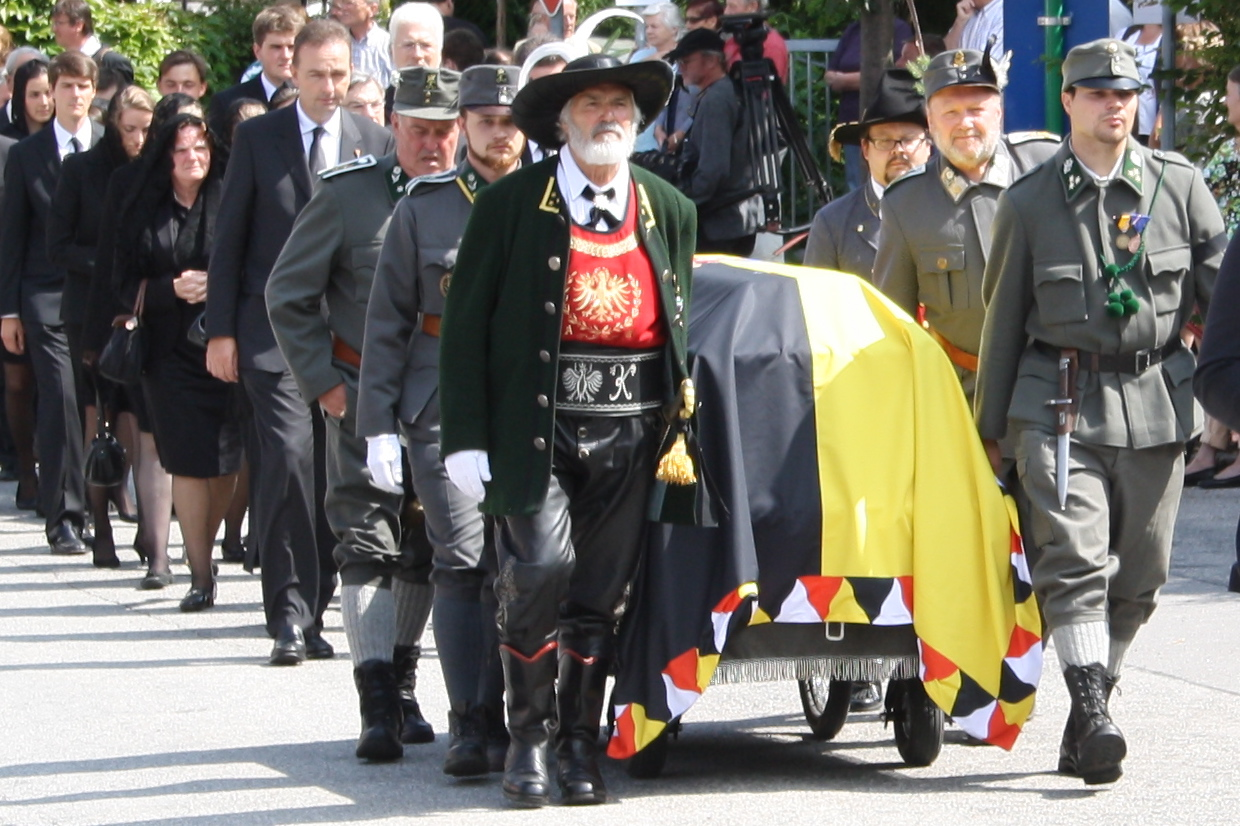
Procession in Pöcking on 9 July with Otto's coffin draped with the Habsburg imperial flag. The pallbearers are dressed in Austro-Hungarian uniforms.

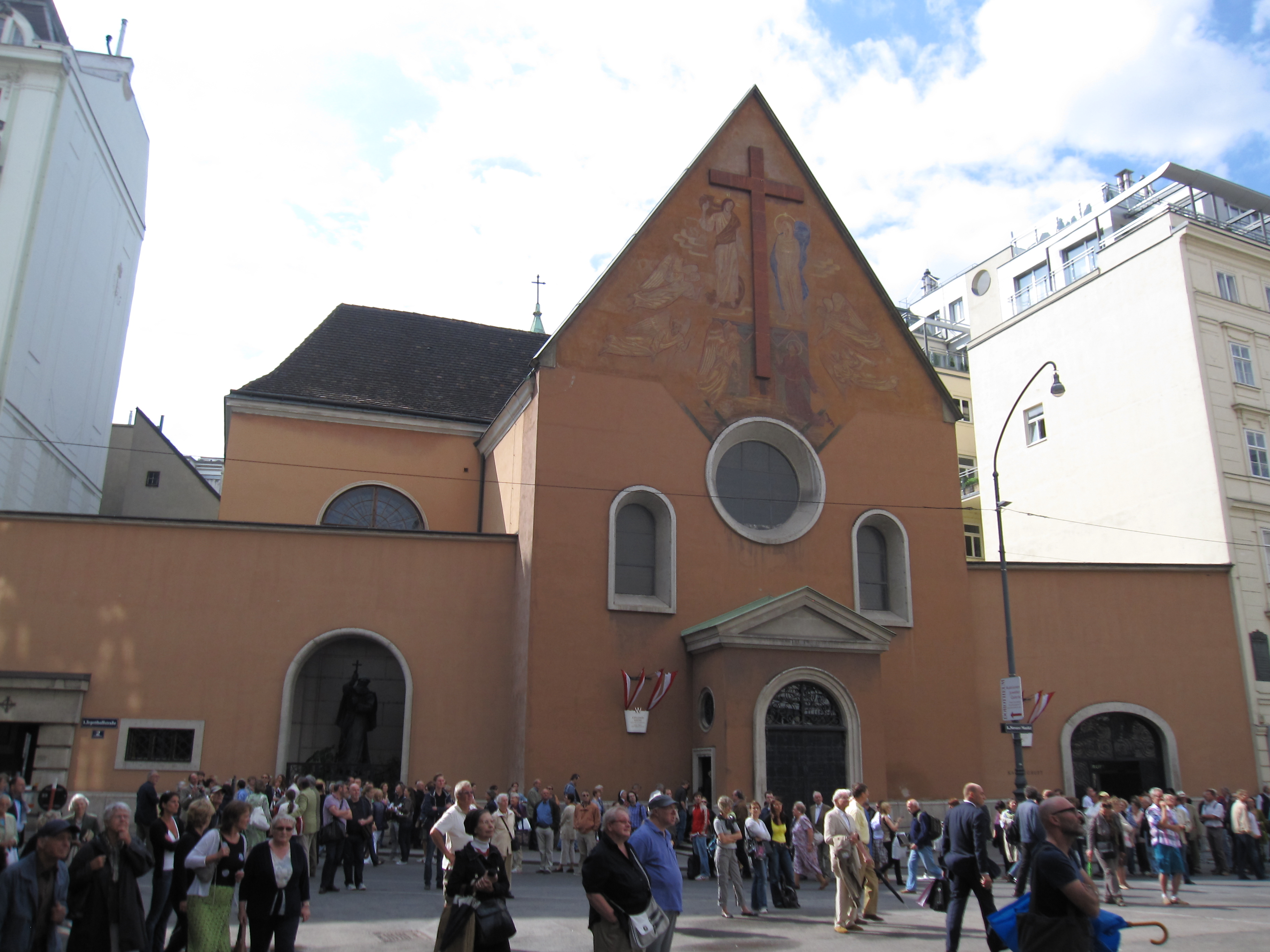
People queueing outside the Capuchin Church to pay their last respects during the lying in repose on 15 July

Pöcking, Bavaria – The requiem masses were initiated with a mass for His Imperial and Royal Highness Archduke Otto of Austria, Prince Royal of Hungary, celebrated on 9 July by Bishop Konrad Zdarsa of Augsburg in the St. Pius church in Pöcking, near Otto's home.

Munich, Bavaria – The second requiem mass was celebrated in the Theatine Church in Munich on 11 July at 10:00 by Cardinal Reinhard Marx and co-celebrated by his predecessor, Cardinal Friedrich Wetter The requiem was screened on big screens at Odeonsplatz and broadcast by Bavarian Television. Munich's senior rabbi, Steven Langnas, recited a Jewish funeral prayer. In closing, God Save Our Emperor, the old Austrian imperial anthem, was sung. Following the requiem Prime Minister of Bavaria Horst Seehofer hosted a reception for around 700 invited guests in the Kaisersaal of the Munich Residenz. Among those attending the requiem and reception were former Austrian Chancellor Wolfgang Schüssel, members of the House of Wittelsbach, of the Order of Malta and the Order of the Golden Fleece, and other European royals and leading politicians.

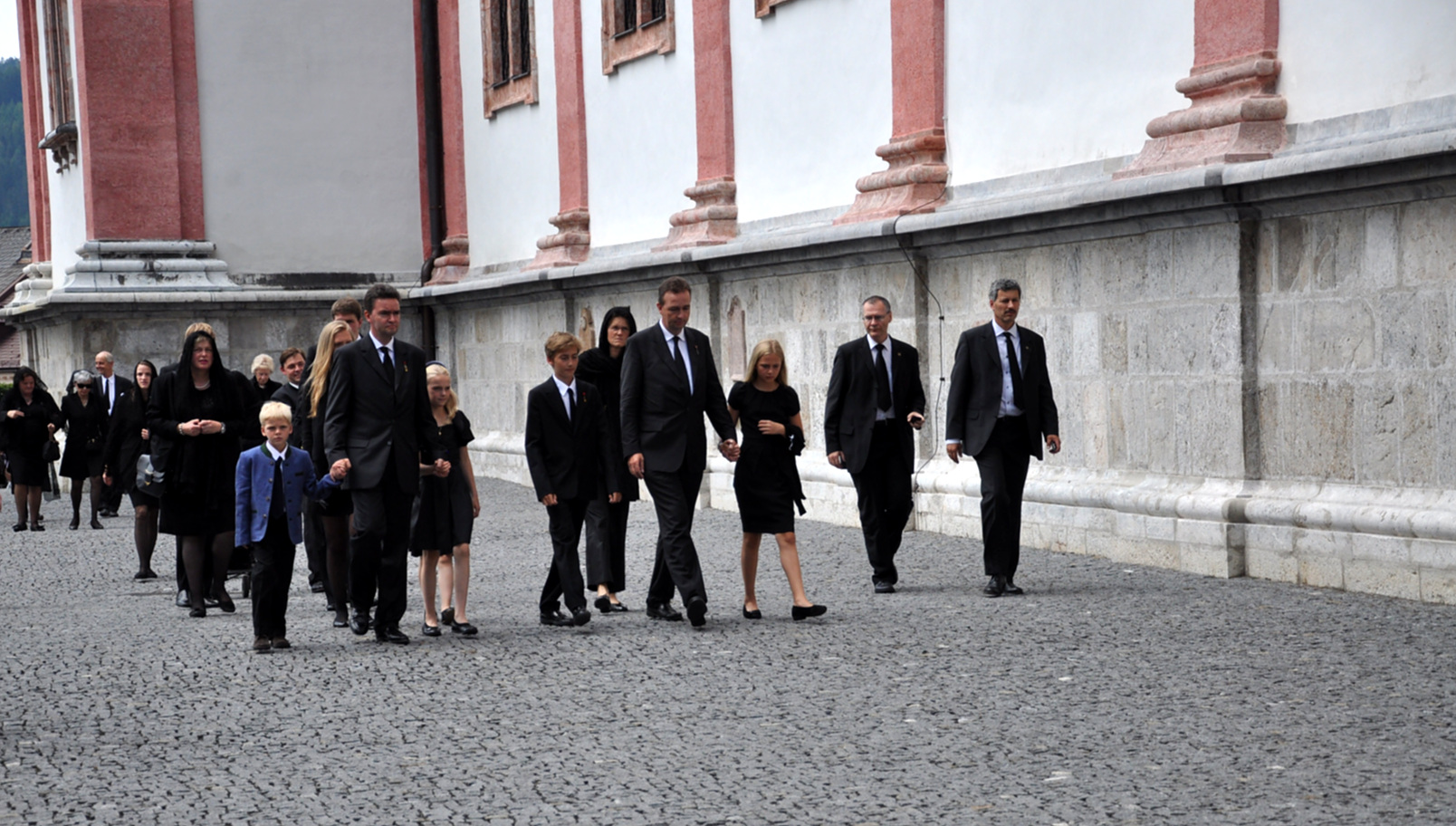
Members of the House of Habsburg arriving in Mariazell for the requiem

Mariazell, Austria – The third requiem was celebrated by Bishop Egon Kapellari in the pilgrimage town of Mariazell on 13 July 2011 at 14:00, with around 1,000 members of the high nobility and leading politicians present. Mariazell has for centuries been the most important pilgrimage town for the House of Habsburg, and large parts of the former Austria-Hungary.

Vienna, Austria – The main funeral ceremony took place in Vienna. The requiem was celebrated in St. Stephen's Cathedral on 16 July 2011 from 15:00, and was presided over by Cardinal Christoph Schönborn, assisted by seven bishops from the various nations of Austria-Hungary. A message from Pope Benedict XVI, addressed to His Imperial Highness, Archduke Karl of Austria, was read by the papal nuncio, Archbishop Peter Zurbriggen. The requiem was followed by a funeral procession through Innere Stadt and the entombment (following the traditional ceremony) of Otto and his wife, Regina, in the Imperial Crypt. Cardinal Schönborn said that the collection which was taken was given to the victims of the 2011 East Africa drought.

While Otto and Regina were lying in repose in the Capuchin Church, Christian, Jewish and Muslim prayers—reflecting the multicultural and multi-religious heritage of Austria-Hungary—were read on Thursday 14 July, by Bishop Stephan Turnovszky, Rabbi Steven Langnas, and Grand Mufti Mustafa Cerić, respectively. On Friday 15 July, the Jewish community organised a ceremony in the Stadttempel, Vienna's main synagogue.

During the lying in repose on 15 July, guards in traditional uniform stood in honour on either side of the two coffins, draped in the imperial yellow-black flag. Thousands of people paid their respect, and visitors were able to write into books of condolence. In front of the coffins, a number of orders, honours and decorations that Otto received throughout his life were laid out on velvet cushions. They include the Order of the Golden Fleece, Grand Cross of the Order of Saint Stephen of Hungary, Grand Cross of the Order of Leopold, Order of the Most Holy Annunciation, Order of Saint Januarius, Order of Saint Hubert, Grand Cross of the Order of Merit of the Federal Republic of Germany, Grand Cross of the Legion of Honour, Grand Cross of the Order of Merit, Sovereign Military Order of Malta Grand Cross Bailiff of Grace and Devotion, Grand Cross of the Order of Charles III, Grand Cross of the Order of St. Gregory the Great, and many others (for a list see here).

Zagreb, Croatia – On 16 July, a requiem was also celebrated in Croatia.

Budapest and Pannonhalma, Hungary – The last requiem mass took place on Sunday, 17 July 2011 at 15:00, and was celebrated by Cardinal László Paskai and co-celebrated by Pannonhalma Archabbot Asztrik Várszegi and a number of Hungarian bishops in St. Stephen's Basilica in Budapest, Hungary. Finally Otto's heart was interred in Pannonhalma Archabbey with only the closest family present.

=== Entombment ceremony ===
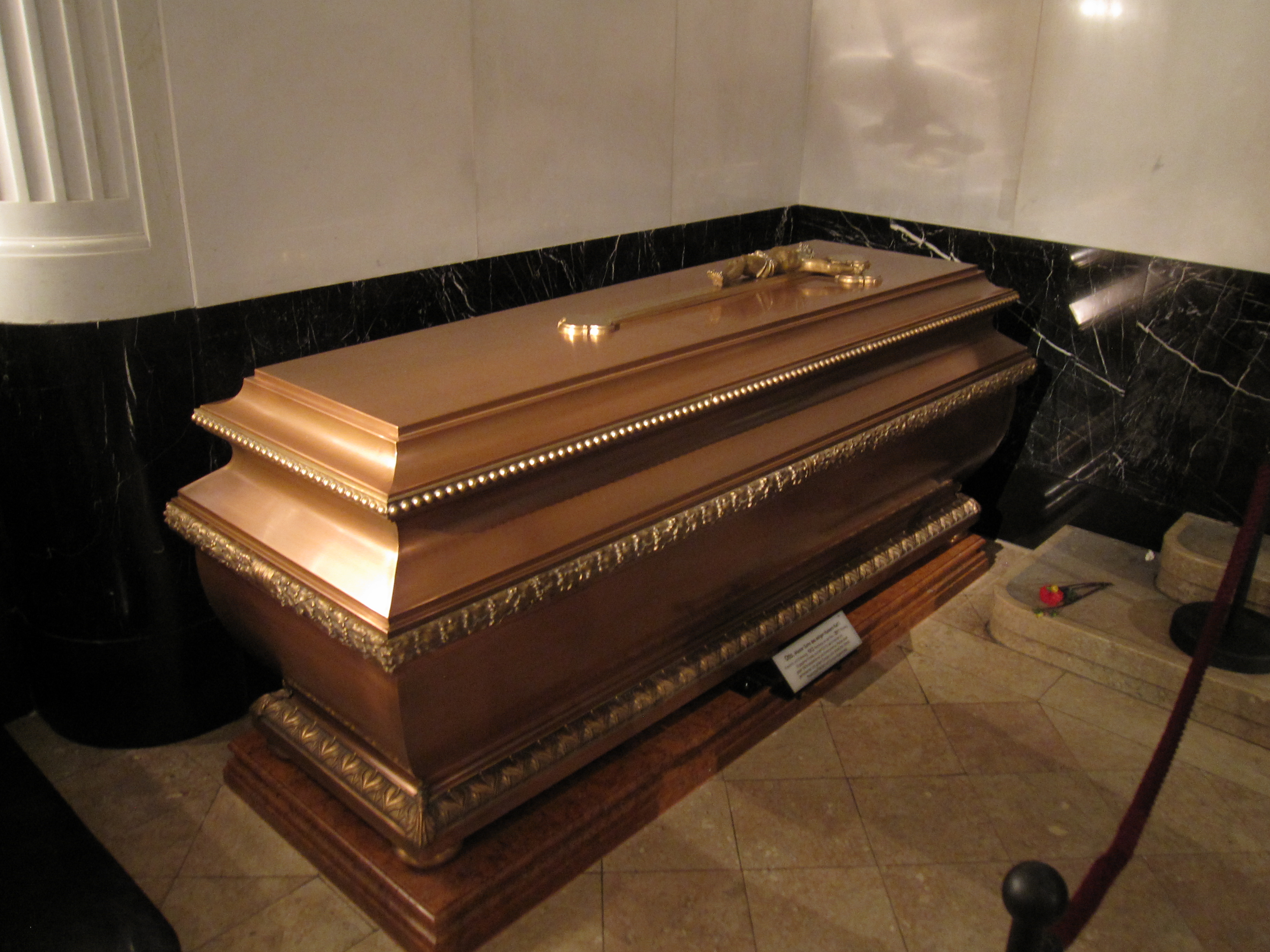
Tomb at Imperial Crypt

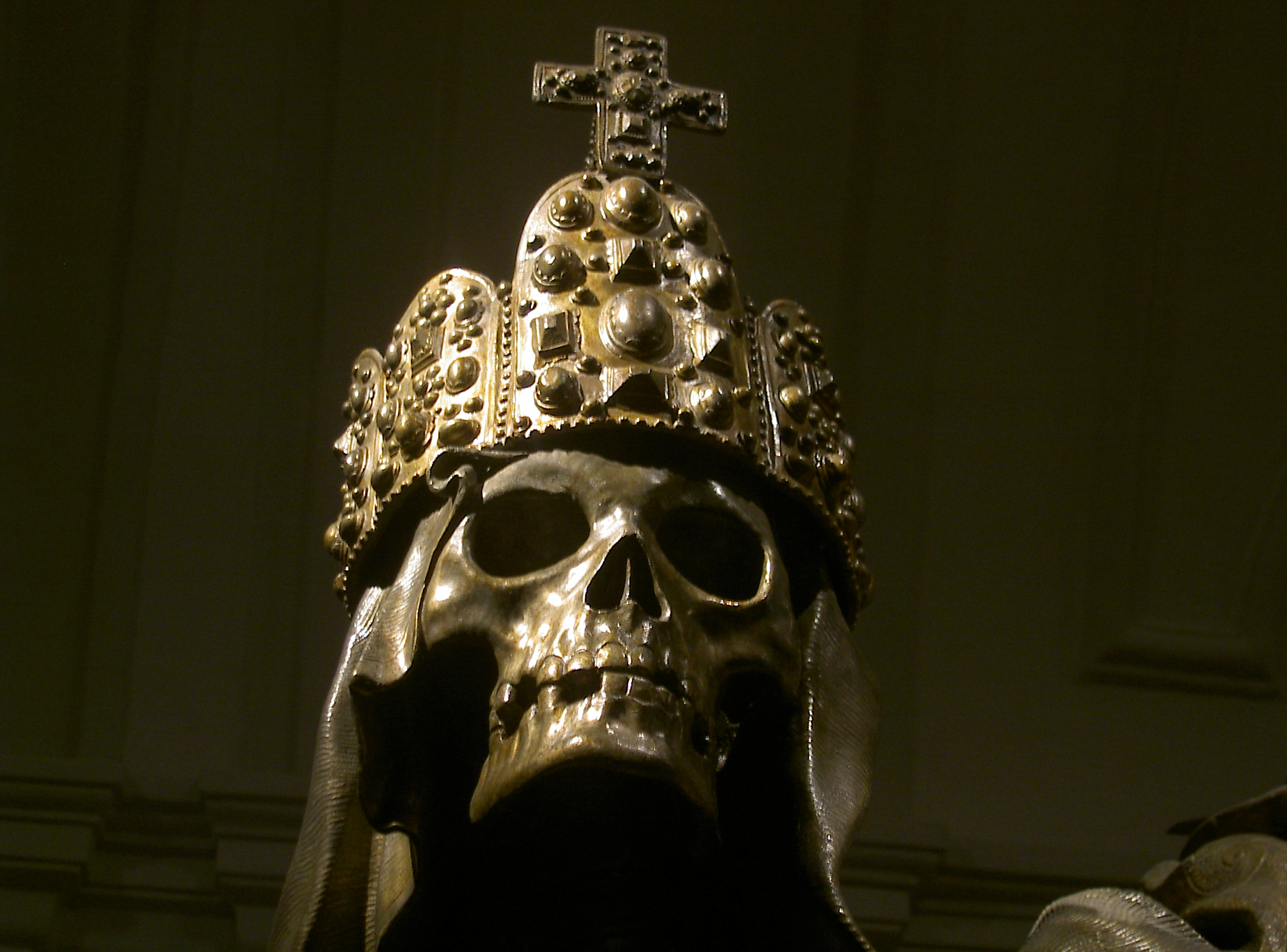
An ornament of the sarcophagus of Otto's ancestor, Charles VI, Holy Roman Emperor, in the Imperial Crypt: a death's head with the Imperial Crown

A traditional ceremony during the funeral is when the procession of mourners arrives at the gates of the Capuchin Church, under which the Imperial Crypt lies, and the Herald knocks on the door. A Capuchin then asks "who demands entry?" The Herald responds with the name and title of the deceased. The Capuchin then responds "we don't know him/her." The same procedure is repeated once. Only on the third attempt, when the Herald responds with "a sinful, mortal human being", are the gates opened and the dead Habsburg admitted into the Crypt. In 1989, Otto's mother, Zita, was first introduced with all her titles, and the second time introduced as "Zita, Her Majesty the Empress and Queen".

Ulrich-Walter Lipp, a friend of the family, was chosen to be the Herald in 2011. Otto was first introduced as "Otto of Austria; former Crown Prince of Austria-Hungary; Prince Royal of Hungary and Bohemia, of Dalmatia, Croatia, Slavonia, Galicia, Lodomeria, and Illyria; Grand Duke of Tuscany and Cracow; Duke of Lorraine, of Salzburg, Styria, Carinthia, Carniola and Bukowina; Grand Prince of Transylvania, Margrave of Moravia; Duke of Silesia, Modena, Parma, Piacenza, Guastalla, Auschwitz and Zator, Teschen, Friuli, Dubrovnik and Zadar; Princely Count of Habsburg and Tyrol, of Kyburg, Gorizia and Gradisca; Prince of Trent and Brixen; Margrave of Upper and Lower Lusatia and Istria; Count of Hohenems, Feldkirch, Bregenz, Sonnenburg etc.; Lord of Trieste, Kotor and the Windic March, Grand Voivod of the Voivodeship of Serbia etc. etc." The traditional Habsburg claims to Jerusalem and Austria were omitted.

The second time he was introduced as "Dr. Otto von Habsburg" and a number of his civic achievements, notably as President of the Paneuropean Union and Member of the European Parliament, mentioned. "Otto Habsburg-Lothringen", the name Austrian authorities use when referring to him, was not used.

The third time he was introduced, in a humble, subdued voice as: "Otto, a mortal, sinful human being!"

The Capuchin opening the gates, finally exclaiming "So he may come in", was Father Gottfried Undesser, the custodian of the Imperial Crypt, born in 1933 and a Capuchin since 1951. It was also Father Gottfried who opened the gates for Empress-Queen Zita in 1989. The Capuchins have been in charge of building and maintaining the Imperial Crypt since 1622.

=== Heart burial ===
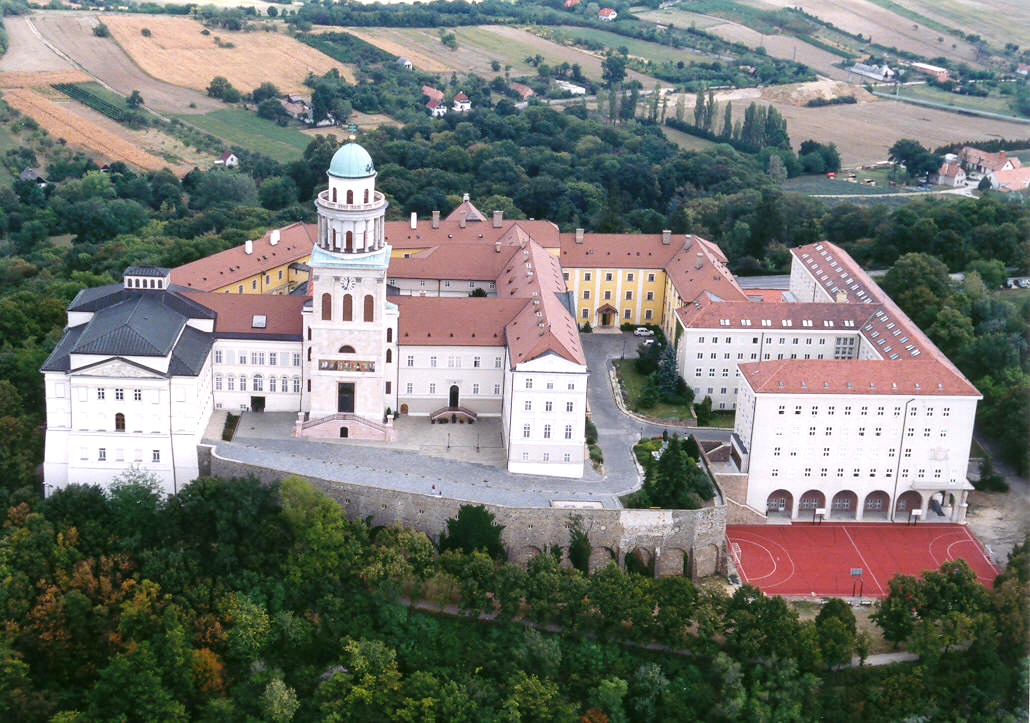
His heart was laid to rest in Pannonhalma Archabbey in Hungary

On Sunday 17 July 2011, Otto's heart was buried in the Benedictine Pannonhalma Archabbey, following a ceremony with vespers in Latin, and an ecumenical prayer. Archabbot Asztrik Várszegi, Reformed Bishop Gusztáv Bölcskei, Lutheran Bishop Tamás Fabinyi, and Chief Rabbi Zsolt Markovics participated, together with around hundred members of the House of Habsburg and Deputy Prime Minister Zsolt Semjén with his wife representing the Hungarian government. A silver urn containing his heart was surrounded by a wreath of flowers and leaves in the colours of the Hungarian flag—red, white and green. His sons Karl (Károly in Hungary) and Georg (György) finally carried the urn to the crypt, where it was buried under a marble slab.

Father Albin, one of the monastery's monks, said that "Hungary never expelled him personally, and he wanted to be buried in a country which still loves him."

With the burial of his heart, 12 days of commemoration and funeral ceremonies in several countries were concluded.

His heart urn lists his name and titles as:

S.K.K.H. [His Imperial and Royal Highness]
Otto
Erzherzog von Österreich [Archduke of Austria]
Königlicher Prinz von Ungarn [Prince Royal of Hungary]

== Dignitaries ==
The list is a selection of those whose participation is publicly known.

=== Pöcking 9 July ===
Royalty and nobility

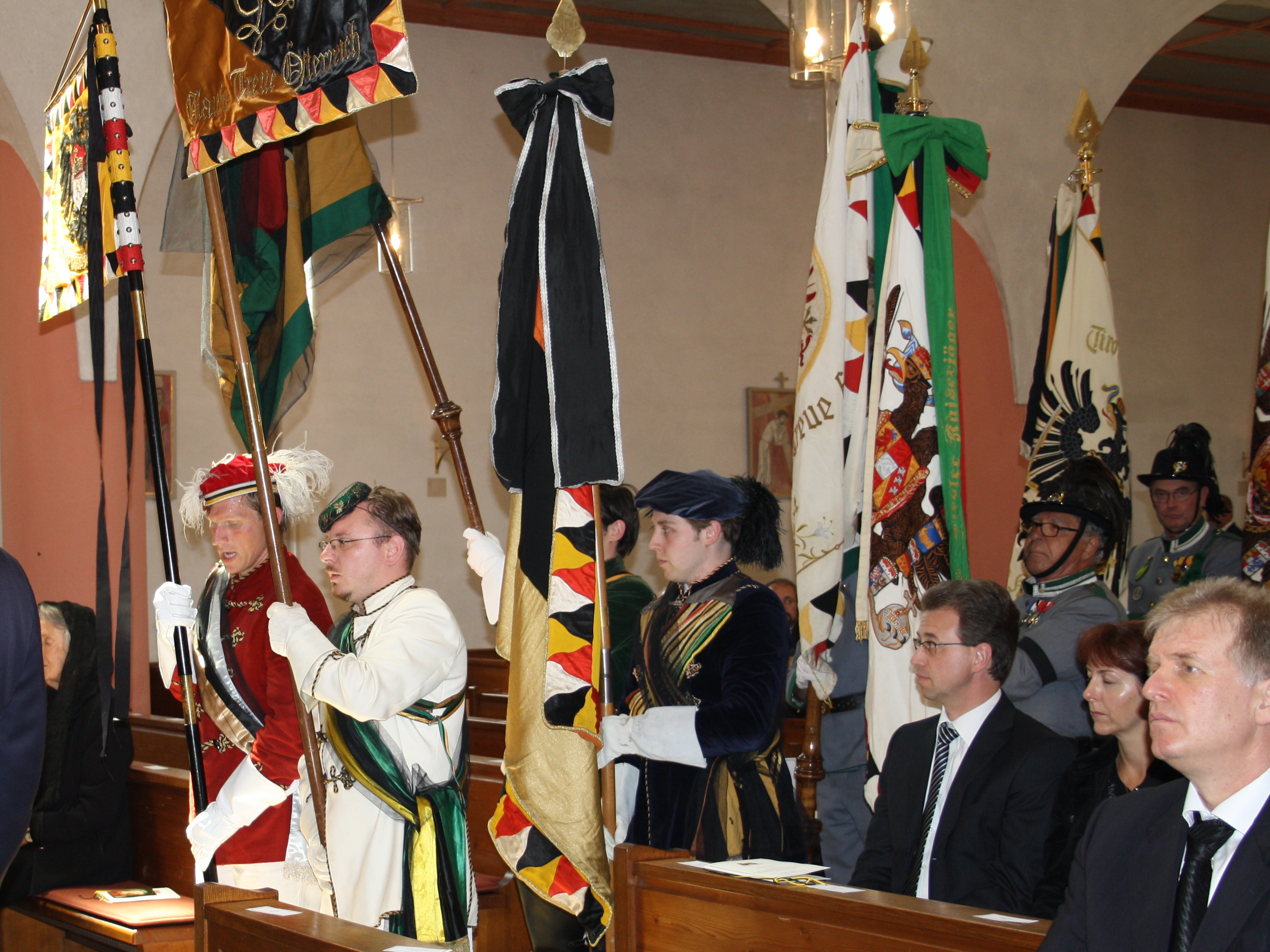
Requiem in Pöcking on 9 July with flag-bearers in traditional uniform

House of Habsburg – Karl of Austria, Georg of Austria, Andrea of Austria, Monika of Austria, Michaela of Austria, Gabriela of Austria, Walburga of Austria, and others

House of Wittelsbach – Prince Luitpold of Bavaria, and others

House of Thurn und Taxis – The Princess Dowager of Thurn and Taxis

House of Esterházy – Count Endre and Countess Christine Esterházy von Galántha

Representatives of state

Bavaria – Minister of State Georg Fahrenschon

Germany – Federal Minister Ilse Aigner

=== Munich 11 July ===
Royalty and nobility

House of Habsburg – Karl of Austria, Georg of Austria, Andrea of Austria, Monika of Austria, Michaela of Austria, Gabriela of Austria, Walburga of Austria, and others

House of Wittelsbach – Prince Luitpold of Bavaria, Prince Max, Duke in Bavaria, Princess Elisabeth, Duchess in Bavaria, and others

Thurn und Taxis – The Princess Dowager of Thurn and Taxis

Representatives of state and politicians

Bavaria – Prime Minister Horst Seehofer, former Prime Minister Edmund Stoiber

Germany – Federal Minister Peter Ramsauer, former Federal Minister Theo Waigel

Austria – Former Chancellor Wolfgang Schüssel

Kosovo – Foreign Minister Enver Hoxhaj

=== Mariazell 13 July ===
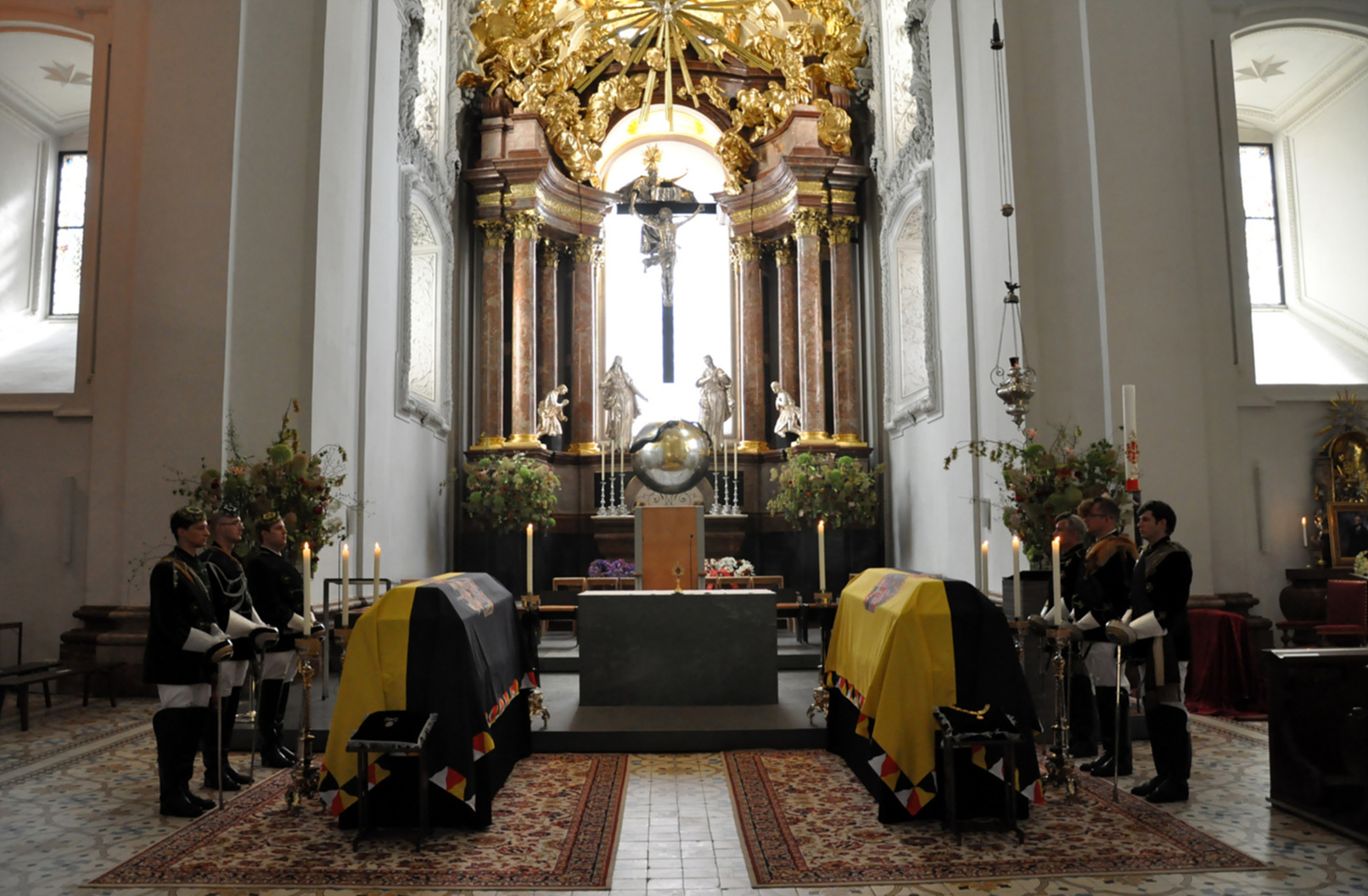
Requiem in the Basilica of Mariazell on 13 July

Representatives of state

Holy See – Cardinal Christoph Schönborn participated as Pope Benedict XVI's personal representative; he also presided over the requiem in Vienna

Religious

Archbishops of central European and Balkan countries that once formed the Austro-Hungarian empire.

=== Vienna 16 July (requiem with subsequent procession and entombment in the Imperial Crypt) ===
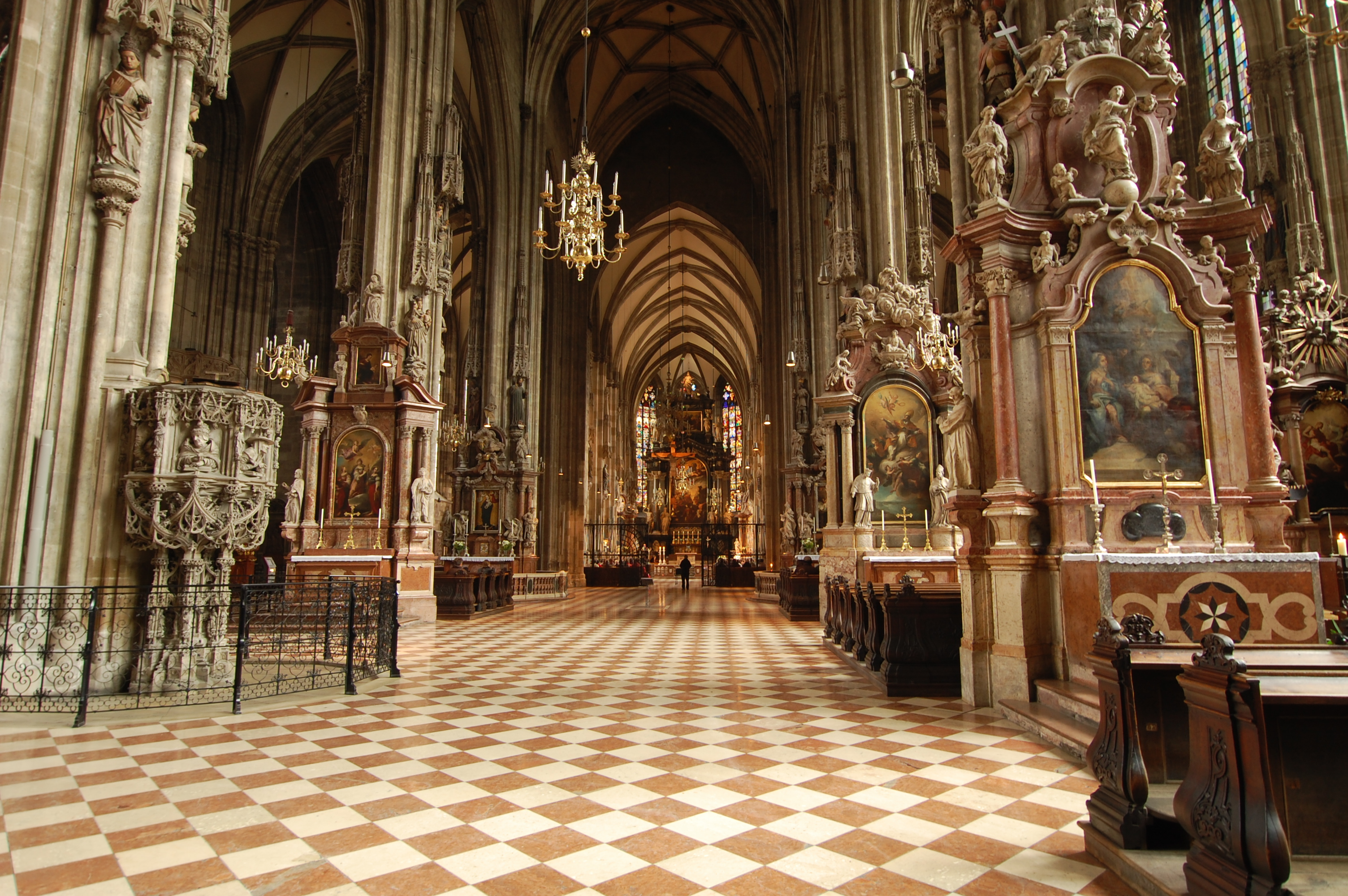
The funeral ceremony took place in St. Stephen's Cathedral, Vienna on 16 July

Many dignitaries attended the funeral in Vienna on 16 July. In total, around 1,000 invited guests were present, among them many royals, nobles, heads of state and government representatives.

Royalty

House of Habsburg (former imperial-royal family of Austria-Hungary) – Karl of Austria, Georg of Austria, Zsófia of Austria, Károly-Konstantin of Austria, Ildikó of Austria, Francesca of Austria, Eleonore of Austria, Ferdinand Zvonimir of Austria, Gloria of Austria, Andrea of Austria, Monika of Austria, Michaela of Austria, Gabriela of Austria, Walburga of Austria, Prince Lorenz of Belgium, Archduke of Austria-Este, Maria-Anna of Austria, Princess Galitzine, and others

Branches of the House of Bourbon

House of Bourbon-Parma (former ducal family of Parma) – Prince Carlos of Bourbon-Parma, Duke of Parma and Piacenza, Princess Annemarie, Prince Jaime, Count of Bardi

House of Bourbon-Parma (Grand Ducal Family of Luxembourg) – Henri, Grand Duke of Luxembourg, Maria Teresa, Grand Duchess of Luxembourg

House of Bourbon (Spanish Royal Family) – Infanta Cristina of Spain

Princely family of Liechtenstein – Hans-Adam II, Prince of Liechtenstein, Marie, Princess of Liechtenstein

House of Bernadotte (Swedish royal family) – King Carl XVI Gustaf of Sweden, Queen Silvia of Sweden

House of Golitsyn – Prince Piotr Dmitrijevitch Galitzine, Princess Tatiana Galitzine, Princess Maria Galitzine (husband and daughters of Archduchess Maria Anna of Austria)

Branches of the House of Hohenzollern

House of Hohenzollern (former Prussian royal family) – Georg Friedrich, Prince of Prussia

House of Hohenzollern-Sigmaringen (former Romanian royal family) – King Michael of Romania

Branches of the House of Saxe-Coburg and Gotha

House of Saxe-Coburg and Gotha (Belgian Royal Family) – Princess Astrid of Belgium, Archduchess of Austria-Este (by marriage a member of the Austria-Este branch of the House of Habsburg)

House of Saxe-Coburg and Gotha (former Bulgarian royal family) – Tsar Simeon II of Bulgaria, former prime minister

(United Kingdom) House of Windsor (British royal family) – Prince Michael of Kent and Marie Christine, Princess Michael of Kent (not attending in official capacity but privately).

House of Savoy – Vittorio Emanuele, Prince of Naples

House of Baden – Maximilian, Margrave of Baden, Valerie, Margravine of Baden (by birth a member of the House of Habsburg)

House of Wittelsbach – Prince Leopold of Bavaria

House of Oldenburg – Duchess Eilika of Oldenburg, wife of Archduke Georg von Habsburg

House of Braganza – Duarte Pio, Duke of Braganza

Solomonic dynasty (former imperial family of Ethiopia) – Le'ul Ras (Prince) Asfa-Wossen Asserate

Royal Family of Jordan – Prince Hassan bin Talal, Princess Sarvath El Hassan

House of Petrović-Njegoš – Crown Prince Nicholas II of Montenegro

Representatives of state (in order of precedence)

Holy See – Pope Benedict XVI appointed Cardinal Christoph Schönborn as his personal representative to the funeral celebrations. Schönborn presided over the requiem in Vienna, as Archbishop of Vienna. The Holy Mass was concelebrated by Czech bishops Dominik Duka (Prague), Vojtěch Cikrle (Brno) and František Lobkowicz (Ostrava-Opava).

Order of Malta – Prince and Grand Master Fra' Matthew Festing

Austria – President Heinz Fischer, his wife Margit Fischer, Chancellor Werner Faymann, Vice-Chancellor Michael Spindelegger, most of the Austrian cabinet and governors, including the major of Vienna Michael Häupl and governor of Lower Austria Erwin Pröll, and other representatives of state.

Hungary – President Pál Schmitt

Georgia – President Mikheil Saakashvili.

North Macedonia – Prime Minister Nikola Gruevski

Croatia – Prime Minister Jadranka Kosor

Czech Republic – Foreign Minister Karel Schwarzenberg.

Bavaria – Representatives of the government of Bavaria are expected.

Other

EU – Jerzy Buzek, Hans-Gert Pöttering, Alejo Vidal-Quadras.

Religious

Teutonic Order – Hochmeister Bruno Platter

Bosnia-Herzegovina – Grand Mufti Mustafa Cerić of Bosnia-Herzegovina

Bavaria – Former Chief Rabbi Steven Langnas of Munich

=== Budapest 17 July ===
Royalty

House of Habsburg – Karl of Austria, Georg of Austria, Andrea of Austria, Monika of Austria, Michaela of Austria, Gabriela of Austria, Walburga of Austria, and others

Representatives of state

Hungary – President Pál Schmitt, Prime Minister Viktor Orbán, Deputy Prime Minister Zsolt Semjén, and others

Members of the Diplomatic Corps and the Order of the Golden Fleece

== Media coverage ==
Around 300 journalists from Europe, America and Japan were accredited to cover the funeral in Vienna.

=== Television broadcasts ===
(Bavaria) – The requiem in the Munich Theatine Church on 11 July was broadcast live by Bayerischer Rundfunk (BR).

(Austria) – ORF broadcast live for six hours from the Vienna funeral on 16 July. Before the live broadcast, ORF broadcast documentaries related to the Imperial-Royal Family.

On average, the 6-hour live broadcast was watched by 413,000 people in Austria, reaching 557,000 at the most.
