= Tatiana Galitzine =

American socialite (born 1984)

Princess Tatiana
- Born: 16 August 1984 (age 41); Santa Clara, California, United States
- Spouse: Guillermo Sierra y Uribe (m. 2017)
- House: Golitsyn
- Father: Prince Peter Galitzine
- Mother: Maria-Anna von Habsburg

Princess Tatiana Petrovna Galitzine (born 16 August 1984) is an American-born architectural designer and UNICEF activist.

== Biography ==
Galitzine was born on 16 August 1984 in Santa Clara, California. She is the second of six children of Prince Peter Galitzine and Archduchess Maria Anna of Austria. She is a member of the House of Golitsyn, a Russian noble family with Lithuanian ancestry. Her mother, the daughter of Archduke Rudolf of Austria and Countess Xenia Czernichev-Besobrasov, is a member of the House of Habsburg-Lorraine. Galitzine is a great-granddaughter of Charles I and Zita of Bourbon-Parma, the last Emperor and Empress of Austria. She was an older sister of Princess Maria Galitzine.

She grew up in Luxembourg, Russia, and the United States and earned degrees in architecture and engineering from the Technical University of Munich. In 2011, she visited Austria to attend the funeral of her granduncle Otto von Habsburg, the last Crown Prince of Austria. She moved from San Francisco, where she was working for Andrew Skurman Architects, to Houston to work at the architectural firm Gensler. In 2017, she founded her own company, Tatiermo Design Firm. She and her husband are board members of UNICEF's Houston Regional Office.

Galitzine married Guillermo Sierra y Uribe, a Mexican-American investment banker, on 29 April 2017 in a Russian Orthodox ceremony at the Colegio de San Ignacio de Loyola Vizcaínas in Mexico City. The wedding was attended by Princess Maria Laura of Belgium, Princess Theresa of Liechtenstein, and Simeon von Habsburg. They live in Houston.
