= Golitsyn =

Golitsyn may refer to:

== People ==
- Anatoliy Golitsyn (1926–2008), Soviet KGB defector
- Anatoliy Golitsyn (pilot) (1908–1978), Soviet pilot
- Golitsyn family, noble family originating in Russia
  - Dmitry Golitsyn (1771–1844), Russian cavalry general prominent during the Napoleonic Wars and Governor of Moscow for 25 years
  - Georgy Golitsyn (1935–2026), Soviet physicist and writer on nuclear winter
  - Mikhail Mikhailovich Golitsyn (field marshal) (1675–1721), Russian Imperial Army general
  - Nikolai Golitsyn (1850–1925), last Tsarist prime minister of Russia
  - Sergei Golitsyn (1909–1989), Russian writer
  - many others listed at House of Golitsyn

== Other ==
- Golitsyn (crater), a lunar crater
- 7161 Golitsyn, minor planet
- Akademik Golitsyn, Soviet and Russian research vessel

== See also ==
- Galitzine
- Golitsyno (disambiguation)
- Category:Golitsyn family
