= Chernyshyov =

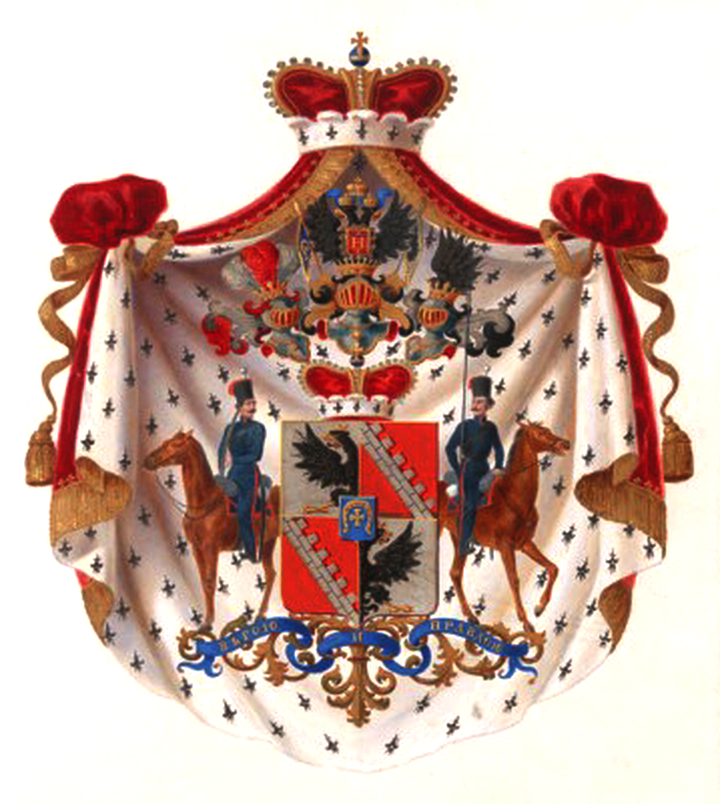
Coat of arms of Princes Chernyshev

The House of Chernyshev (Chernyshyov) is an ancient Russian princely family, part the Russian nobility, whose members once bore the title of Knyaz in the Russian Empire, granted to them by Emperor Nicholas I on 16 April 1841.

== Surname ==
Chernyshyov or Chernyshev (Russian: Чернышёв) is also a Russian masculine surname, its feminine counterpart is Chernyshyova or Chernysheva.

== Notable people ==
- Arkady Chernyshev (1914–1992), Soviet ice hockey and association football player
- Alexander Chernyshyov (1786–1857), military leader of 1812 guerrilla warfare, diplomat and statesman (Russian Minister of War, 1827–1856)
- Aleksandr Chernyshyov (1882–1940), Russian electrical engineer
- Alexey Chernyshyov (born 1939), governor of Orenburg Oblast, Russia
- Avdotya Chernysheva (1693–1747), Russian noble and lady in waiting
- Darya Petrovna Saltykova, née Chernyshyova (1739–1802), lady-in-waiting, socialite and noble
- Dmitry Chernyshyov (born 1975), Russian swimmer
- Evgenia Chernyshyova, Russian figure skater
- Feodosy Chernyshyov (1856–1914), Russian geologist and paleontologist
- Ivan Chernyshyov (1726–1797), Russian field marshal
- Lyudmila Chernyshyova (born 1952), Russian volleyball player
- Nadezhda Chernyshyova (born 1951), Russian rower
- Natalya Golitsyna, née Chernyshyova (1741–1838), lady-in-waiting, socialite and noble
- Nikolai Chernyshev (1906–1953), Soviet rocket scientist
- Olga Chernysheva (born 1962), Russian artist
- Peter Tchernyshev (born 1971), Russian-American ice dancer
- Piotr Grigoryevich Chernyshev (1712–1773), diplomat, statesman
- Vladimir Chernyshyov (1951–2004), Russian volleyball player
- Countess Xenia Czernichev-Besobrasov (1929–1968), Austrian princess
- Zakhar Chernyshyov (1722–1784), Russian Minister of War
