= Gallitzin =

Gallitzin may refer to:

== People ==
- House of Golitsyn, sometimes romanized Gallitzin; with this spelling, in particular:
  - Adelheid Amalie Gallitzin (1748–1806), German salonist
  - Dmitri Alekseyevich Gallitzin (1728–1803), Russian diplomat, author, and mineralogist
  - Demetrius Augustine Gallitzin (1770–1840), Dutch-born Russian-American Roman Catholic priest, son of Adelheid Amalie
  - Demetrius Michalowitsch von Gallitzin (1721–1793), Russian diplomat, philanthropist and art collector

== Places ==
- Gallitzin, Pennsylvania, US
- Gallitzin Township, Pennsylvania, US
- Gallitzin State Forest, Pennsylvania, US

== See also ==
- Galitzine
