= Maria Galitzine =

Russian interior designer (1988–2020)

Princess Maria
- Born: 11 May 1988; Luxembourg City, Luxembourg
- Died: 4 May 2020 (aged 31); Houston, Texas, US
- Burial: Forest Park Westheimer Cemetery; Houston, Texas
- Spouse: Rishi Roop Singh (m. 2017)
- Issue: Maxim Vir Singh
- House: Golitsyn
- Father: Prince Peter Galitzine
- Mother: Archduchess Maria Anna von Habsburg
- Occupation: Interior designer

Princess Maria Petrovna Galitzine (11 May 1988 – 4 May 2020) was a Luxembourg-born Russian interior designer.

== Biography ==
Galitzine was born on 11 May 1988 in Luxembourg City, Luxembourg as the fourth of six children of Prince Peter Galitzine and Archduchess Maria Anna of Austria. She was a member of the House of Golitsyn, a Russian noble family with Lithuanian ancestry. Her mother, the daughter of Archduke Rudolf of Austria and Countess Xenia Czernichev-Besobrasov, is a member of the House of Habsburg-Lorraine. Galitzine was a great-granddaughter of Charles I and Zita of Bourbon-Parma, the last Emperor and Empress of Austria. She was also a descendant of King George II via his daughter Anne, Princess Royal. She was a younger sister of Princess Tatiana Galitzine.

In 1993, she moved to Russia with her parents and attended the German School of Moscow. She attended the College of Art & Design in Brussels before moving to Chicago to work as an interior designer. She later moved to Houston.

She married Rishi Roop Singh, a Houston-based chef of Indian descent, in a Russian Orthodox ceremony on 10 February 2017. They had one son.

She died on 4 May 2020 from a cardiac aneurysm. She is buried in the Eastern Orthodox section of Forest Park Westheimer Cemetery in Houston.
