= Andrew Skurman =

American architect (born 1953)

- Born: March 17, 1953 (age 73); Oceanside, New York, U.S.
- Education: Cooper Union (BArch)
- Occupation: Architect

Andrew Skurman (March 17, 1953) is an American architect. He is currently principal architect at Andrew Skurman Architects.

== Early life and education ==
Skurman was born in Oceanside, New York in 1953. Skurman received his Bachelor of Architecture in 1976 from Cooper Union in New York. Skurman credits a visit as a teenager to Philip Johnson's office in the Seagram Building on Park Avenue as the deciding moment he wanted to become an architect. Skurman has cited Andrea Palladio, Juan Gris, Le Corbusier as influences and I.M. Pei and John Hejduk as early mentors. Diane Lewis wrote, "For Skurman the project--each project--comes to fruition almost at once. Lines of light defining space. A collage he once made, inspired by Violon et Guitare by Juan Gris, folded and cut simply of only white paper, sliced in the manner in which he draws, was and remains the opening salvo of his style."

== Career ==
After graduating from Cooper Union, Skurman worked as a designer for I.M. Pei in 1976, where he assisted on the design of the Louvre Pyramid. In 1980, Skurman worked in the San Francisco office of Skidmore, Owings, and Merrill and, in 1987, joined Gensler & Associates before founding Andrew Skurman Architects in 1992. Diane Dorrans.

In 2010, Skurman received the honor of being named a Chevalier of Arts and Letters by the Minister of Culture of France. He is a founder of the Northern California chapter of The Institute of Classical Architecture and Art and was that chapter's president in 2013–2014. Skurman is on the board of directors for the National Institute of Classical Architecture and Art. He was Creative Director of the San Francisco Fall Antiques Show, the oldest continuously operating international antiques show on the West Coast, from 2008 to 2013.

In 2025 'The Watercolors of Skurman Architects" was published by Triglyph Books. In December 2025, Mr. Skurman sold his firm to Ed Watkins and Pierre Guettier, two architects at the firm who have worked with Andrew for close to 20 years. Since then, the firm's name has been legally changed to Skurman Architects. Andrew is still very active with the firm, as a consultant, and now lives permanently in France.

== Work ==
In addition to working nationally the firm is currently working on projects in India, Poland, Japan and France.

Notable Architectural Projects

Major Projects of Andrew Skurman and his architectural office Andrew Skurman Architects include:

• The Salon Dore and the French Rooms of Gallery 9 of the California Palace of the Legion of Honor—San Francisco

• Wattis Room, Louise M. Davies Symphony Hall—San Francisco

• Resort at Pelican Hill—Newport Beach

Books

• Contemporary Classical: The Architecture of Andrew Skurman (2012)

• The Watercolors of Skurman Architecture (2025)

== Awards ==
- Eight Julia Morgan Awards from the Institute of Classical Architecture and Art
- Chevalier of Arts & Letters by the French Minister of Culture (2010)
- Arthur Ross Award in Architecture from The Institute of Classical Architecture and Art (2020)
- Best Residential Architects in San Francisco (2020)
- Ranked 2nd in the world for Best Traditional Architecture Firm (2026)
- Honorary doctorate from Academy of Art University (2023)
