= Feodosy Chernyshev =

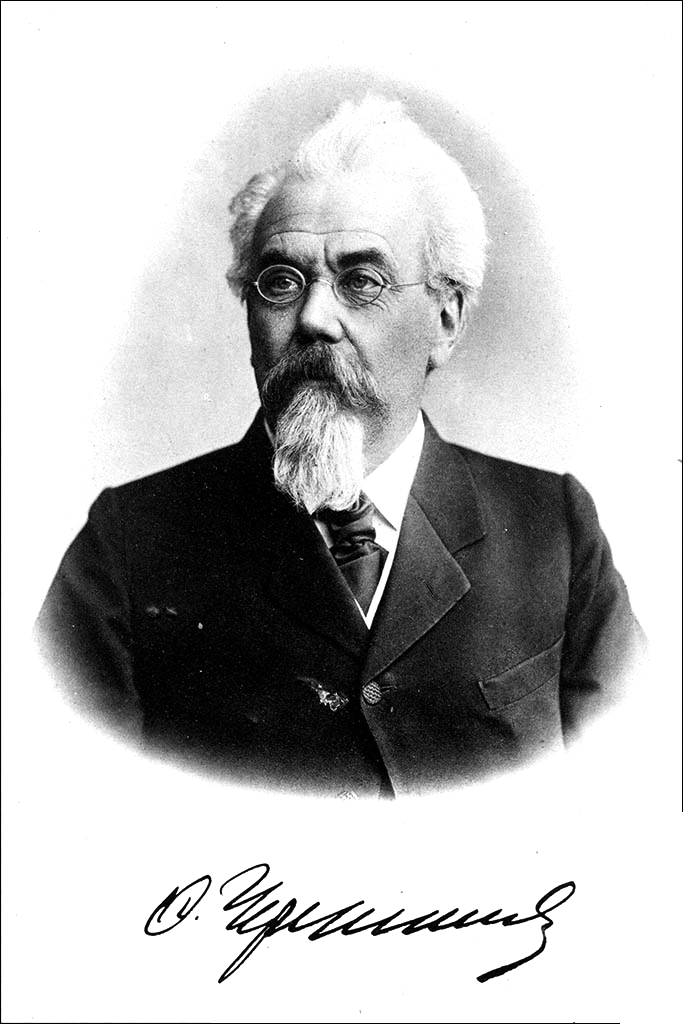
F. N. Chernyshev

Feodosy Nikolayevich Chernyshov or Feodosii Nikolaevich Chernyshev (Russian: Феодо́сий Никола́евич Чернышёв; 24 September [O.S. 12 September] 1856 – 15 January [O.S. 2 January] 1914) was a geologist and a paleontologist. He was among the first to produce high resolution geological maps of the Urals region where he discovered Devonian strata. Chernyshev was an Honorary Member of Russian and Foreign Learned Societies.

== Early life ==
Chernyshev was born in Kiev where his parents were teachers. He was named after St. Theodosius. After studies at home, he joined Kiev gymnasium where he studied languages, mathematics and physics. He became interested in travels after meeting a family acquaintance who brought stories of sea voyages. He then joined the naval school in 1872 but in 1875 his father asked the head of the school to dismiss his son due to poor health (probably poor eyesight) and this was granted. He then joined the mining institute in 1875 and graduated from the St. Petersburg Mining Institute in 1880. Here his teachers included P.V. Eremeev and V.I. Möller, A.P. Karpinsky, I.V. Mushketov, and G. D. Romanovsky. He also received a Catherine's Scholarship. He then joined the civil service as a mining engineer and worked under V.I. Möller in the Urals. His field surveys led him to the study of stratigraphy of paleozoic deposits in the Ural Mountains. In 1882, he was put in charge of compiling a geological map at the scale of 10 Versts to an inch.

In 1892, he directed the mapping of the Donbas area and geologic maps of the southern Urals and Timan Ridge. He later, in 1900, became the director of the Geologic Museum.

He died suddenly in 1914 and was buried in Smolensk Cemetery, St. Petersburg.
