= Gusztáv Bölcskei =

Hungarian bishop

The Most Revd Gusztáv Bölcskei
- Bishop of Debrecen
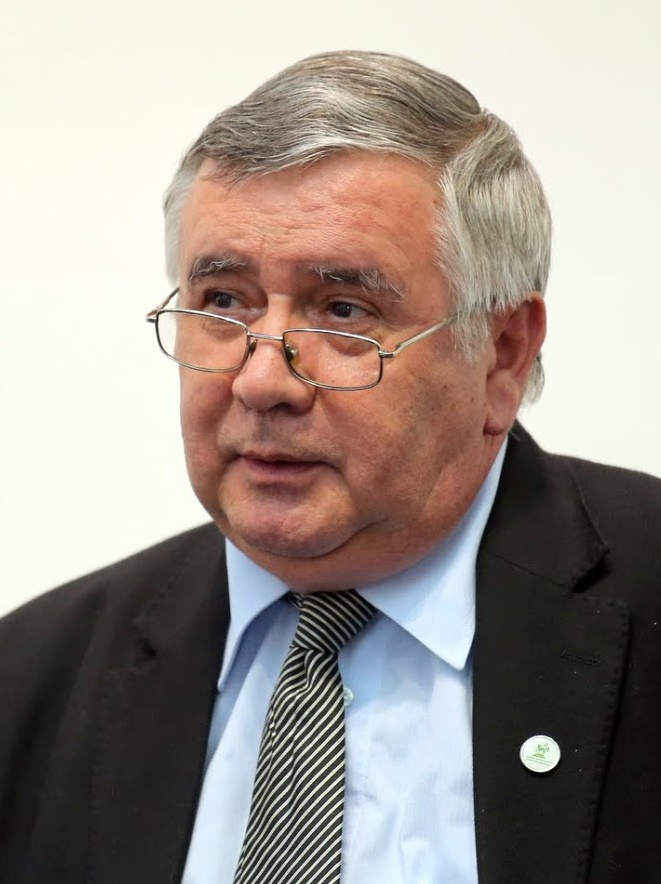
- Diocese: Tiszántúl Reformed District
- Installed: 1997
- Predecessor: Dr Elemér Kocsis

Orders
- Ordination: 1978
- Consecration: 1997

Personal details
- Born: Gusztáv Bölcskei; 30 July 1952 (age 74) Szamoskér, Hungary
- Denomination: Reformed
- Residence: Palace of Bishop, Debrecen
- Profession: Theologian
- Education: Debrecen Reformed Theological University

Dr. Gusztáv Bölcskei (born 30 July 1952) is a Hungarian Reformed bishop and a theologian. He is the former clerical president of the Synod of the Reformed Church in Hungary and bishop of Debrecen. Bölcskei is Executive Committee Member of the World Communion of Reformed Churches, former president of WCRC Europe, and a professor of church sociology at Debrecen Reformed Theological University.

== Life and career ==
Bölcskei was born on 30 July 1952 in Szamoskér, Hungary, as the 6th child of a minister of the Reformed Church in Hungary. He received his primary education in Szamoskér, then at age 14 he went to the Grammar school of the famous Debrecen Reformed College in Debrecen, Hungary. He finished school in 1970, and worked for a year in a state foster home in Nyírmártonfalva, as a non-qualified educator. Between 1971 and 1976 he studied at Debrecen Reformed Theological University (then called Debrecen Reformed Theological Academy).

He spent the academic year 1977/78 with a scholarship at University of Tübingen, Germany. From 1979 he taught as a tutor in theology at Debrecen Reformed Theological Academy. In December 1984 Bölcskei started to teach RE in the Grammar School of Debrecen reformed College.

He became chair of Department of Social Ethic at Debrecen Reformed Theological University in 1990. In the 90's he was twice elected to be head of the university, and also the college. He received a Doctorate from Gáspár Károli University of the Reformed Church (Budapest, Hungary) in 1994. His dissertation was on the social ethic of Arthur Rich. From 2015 to 2017, he was the rector of the Reformed Theological University.

Two universities awarded him Honorary Doctorates: Babeș-Bolyai University, Cluj, Romania in 2003, and the Evangelical-Lutheran Theological University (Budapest, Hungary) in 2005.

=== Pastor and Bishop ===
From 2006 to 2011 he was president of WCRC Europe and Executive Committee Member of the World Communion of Reformed Churches.

== Selected publications ==
- Modus Concordiae, Enyed 1564, in: Barton, P. – Makkai L. (ed.), Confessiones ecclesiarum evangelico-reformatorum A.C. et H.C. Europae Centro-Orientalis tempore reformationis, III/1. 1564–1576, Budapest, 1987
- A kezdetektől a váradi iskola beolvadásáig, in: Barcza József (szerk.), A Debreceni Református Kollégium története, Budapest, MORE Zsinati Irodájának Sajtóosztálya, 1988, 9–42. o.
- Idegen eredetű vallási szavak és kifejezések szótára, (Lenkey Istvánnal közösen), Debrecen, Ethnica Alapítvány, 1991 = Idegen szavak szótára. Függelékben az egyházi irodalomban használt hazai és külföldi rövidítések válogatott jegyzéke, (Lenkey Istvánnal közösen), Debrecen, Debreceni Református Kollégium, 1985
- A református egyház, in: Gesztelyi Tamás (szerk.), Egyházak és vallások a mai Magyarországon, Budapest, Akadémiai Kiadó, 1991
- A Magyarországi Református Egyház, in: Barcza József – Bütösi János (szerk.), „Tebenned bíztunk eleitől fogva", Debrecen, 1991
- „A halálon túl." Öt évezred filozófiai és teológiai válaszaiból, (DRTA Etikai és Szociológiai Szemináriumának Füzetei; 1), Debrecen, 1991
- Aufklärung und Säkularisation als Herausforderung für die Kirchen in Ungarn, in: Kirchen im Kontext unterschiedlicher Kulturen, Göttingen, Vandenhoeck & Ruprecht, 1991
- Az Ige fényénél. Válogatás a debreceni Nagytemplomban elhangzott igehirdetésekből, Arató Ferenc, Bölcskei Gusztáv et al., Debrecen, Nagytemplomi Református Egyházközség, 1992
- Europa und seine Grenzen. Kulturelle-anthropologische Unterschiede im Denken über Lebensqualität. Beispiel Ungarn, in: Ethik des Lebens in kulturellen Kontexten, Hg. Societas Ethica, 1994
- Arthur Rich szociáletikai kritériológiája és a XX. század második felének magyar református szociáletikai felismerései, in: „Krisztusért járva követségben…" Tanulmányok Fekete Károly és Lenkeyné Semsey Klára professzorok tiszteletére, Debrecen, DRTA, 1996
- A szociális kérdés a teológiában és az egyházban – akkor és ma, Confessio 1997/2. 36–40. o.
- A legújabb kori egyháztörténetünk áttekintése (1948–1990), in: Barcza József – Dienes Dénes (szerk.), A Magyarországi Református Egyház története 1918–1990. Tanulmányok, (A Sárospataki Teológiai Akadémia Egyháztörténeti Tanszékének kiadványai; 4), Sárospatak, Sárospataki Református Kollégium Teológiai Akadémiája, 1999, 155–172. o.
- A magyarországi református teológiai munka fél évszázada szociáletikai megközelítésből, in: Barcza József – Dienes Dénes (szerk.), A Magyarországi Református Egyház története 1918–1990. Tanulmányok, (A Sárospataki Teológiai Akadémia Egyháztörténeti Tanszékének kiadványai; 4), Sárospatak, Sárospataki Református Kollégium Teológiai Akadémiája, 1999, 191–200. o.
- Krisztus követésében – szabadon, avagy létezik-e „vidám engedelmesség"?, in: Sulyok Elemér – Varga Mátyás (szerk.): Találkozások – Várszegi Asztrik pannonhalmi főapát hatvanadik születésnapjára, Pannonhalma, Pannonhalmi Főapátság, 2006, 195–204. o.
- A hatalom alá vetett ember szabadsága. Az egyház igehirdetése a szekularizált ember felé, in: Látó szívvel (Lukács László piarista szerzetes köszöntésére), Budapest, Vigilia, 2006, 188–192. o.

== See also ==
- Reformed Church in Hungary
- Debrecen Reformed Theological University
- World Communion of Reformed Churches
