= Maria-Anna Galitzine =

Austrian princess and Catholic activist (born 1954)

Archduchess Maria-Anna
- Princess Piotr Galitzine
- Born: Maria-Anna Charlotte Zita Elisabeth Regina Therese von Habsburg-Lothringen; 19 May 1954 (age 72); Brussels, Belgium
- Spouse: Prince Piotr Dmitrijevitch Galitzine (m. 1981)
- Issue: Princess Xenia; Princess Tatiana; Princess Alexandra; Princess Maria; Prince Dimitri; Prince Ioann
- House: Habsburg-Lorraine
- Father: Archduke Rudolf
- Mother: Countess Xenia Czernichev-Besobrasov

Maria-Anna Galitzine (Maria-Anna Charlotte Zita Elisabeth Regina Therese; born 19 May 1954), also known as Archduchess Maria-Anna of Austria and Princess Maria-Anna Galitzine, is a Belgian traditionalist Catholic activist and member of the House of Habsburg-Lorraine. A granddaughter of Charles I of Austria and Zita of Bourbon-Parma, the last emperor and empress of Austria-Hungary, she has been active in supporting their cause for sainthood in the Catholic Church.

== Early life, family, and education ==
Maria-Anna was born in exile in Brussels on 19 May 1954 to Archduke Rudolf of Austria and Countess Xenia Czernichev-Besobrasov. A member of the exiled Austrian imperial family, her father was the youngest son of Charles I and Zita, the last emperor and empress of Austria and king and queen of Hungary. Her mother was a member of the Russian nobility and a descendant of the Sheremetev family. Maria-Anna was raised in a religious family and was baptized in the Catholic faith. Her mother died in a car accident in 1968. Her father married a second time, to Princess Anna Gabriele von Wrede, in 1971. Maria-Anna is a sister of Simeon von Habsburg.

She was educated in Brussels and studied economics, politics, and sociology at Université catholique de Louvain. After graduating, she worked at a financial fund in Belgium and, later, at Brown Brothers Harriman & Co. in New York City.

== Activism ==
In 1993, Maria-Anna and her family moved to Moscow. While there, she served on the board of a children's school, organized an annual charity dinner for local medical institutions for children in need, and worked on repairing churches in Russian villages.

Maria-Anna has played an active role in the campaign for sainthood of her grandparents. Her grandfather, Charles I, was Beatified by Pope John Paul II in 2004, and is known in the Catholic Church as Blessed Karl of Austria. Her grandmother, Zita, was named a Servant of God in 2009.

After moving to Chicago in 2008, Maria-Anna became a parishioner at St. John Cantius Church. Father Frank Phillips, the pastor of St. John Cantius Church, built a shrine in honor of Maria-Anna's family in the church's Chapel of Dormition. The shrine is dedicated to her grandparents and an ancestor of her husband, Prince Demetrius Augustine Gallitzin, who is also venerated in the Catholic faith. She was a guest at a formal banquet hosted by the Canons Regular of St. John Cantius at the University Club of Chicago, and promoted the religious community's efforts to maintain traditional liturgical forms.

In July 2011, she served on the VIP Host Committee of the Moscow Demographic Summit, an event sponsored by the World Congress of Families focusing on promoting traditional marriage, increasing birthrates, ending abortion, ending the death penalty, and advocating for family rights around the world.

In 2015, she attended the Museum of Fine Arts, Houston's exhibit “Habsburg Splendor: Masterpieces from Vienna’s Imperial Collections. In October of the same year, she attended a solemn mass and was a guest speaker at a reception for the feast day of her grandfather at St. Mary, Mother of God Catholic Church in Washington, D.C.

In October 2018, Maria-Anna was a guest of honor at a three-day symposium held in Dallas, hosted by the Emperor Karl League of Prayer and the Priestly Fraternity of Saint Peter, in honor of her grandfather's feast day. The symposium, attended by over five-hundred people, was held in order to bring awareness to the cause for sainthood of Charles I. Maria-Anna gave talks about her family at the public library in Allen and at Mater Dei Catholic Church as part of the symposium. The symposium concluded with a Solemn Mass including the veneration and blessing of a first-class relic of Charles I. Maria-Anna remains an active member and leader in the Blessed Karl League of Prayer. In 2019, she gave an interview during the Symposium on Blessed Karl von Habsburg, The Last Emperor & King of Austria-Hungary.

On 8 November 2020, Maria-Anna and Suzanne Pearson gave a lecture, as part of the Cardinal Mindszenty Speaker Series, called The Saintly Life of Blessed Karl of Austria-Hungary, at St. Mary of Victories Church in St. Louis, Missouri.

== Personal life ==
Maria-Anna married Prince Piotr Dmitrijevitch Galitzine, a Russian Orthodox aristocrat, businessman, and member of the House of Golitsyn, on 24 November 1981 in a civil ceremony in Woluwe-Saint-Pierre. They had a Catholic ceremony on 25 November 1981 in Uccle.

Maria-Anna and her husband had six children:

- Princess Xenia Petrovna Galitzine (b. 23 May 1983)
- Princess Tatiana Petrovna Galitzine (b. 16 August 1984)
- Princess Alexandra Petrovna Galitzine (b. 7 August 1986)
- Princess Maria Petrovna Galitzine (11 May 1988 – 4 May 2020)
- Prince Dimitri Petrovich Galitzine (b. 11 June 1990)
- Prince Ioann Teimouraz Petrovich Galitzine (b. 27 May 1992)

Exiled from Austria in the earlier years of their marriage, due to the Habsburg Law, Maria-Anna and her family lived in Belgium, Luxembourg, Russia, and the United States.

On 16 July 2011, the family attended the funeral and burial of Maria-Anna's uncle and the last crown prince of Austria, Otto von Habsburg, in Vienna.

Her daughter, Princess Maria, died in 2020.
