= Archduke Rudolf of Austria (1919–2010) =

Austrian Archduke (1919–2010)

Archduke Rudolf
- Royal Prince of Hungary and Bohemia
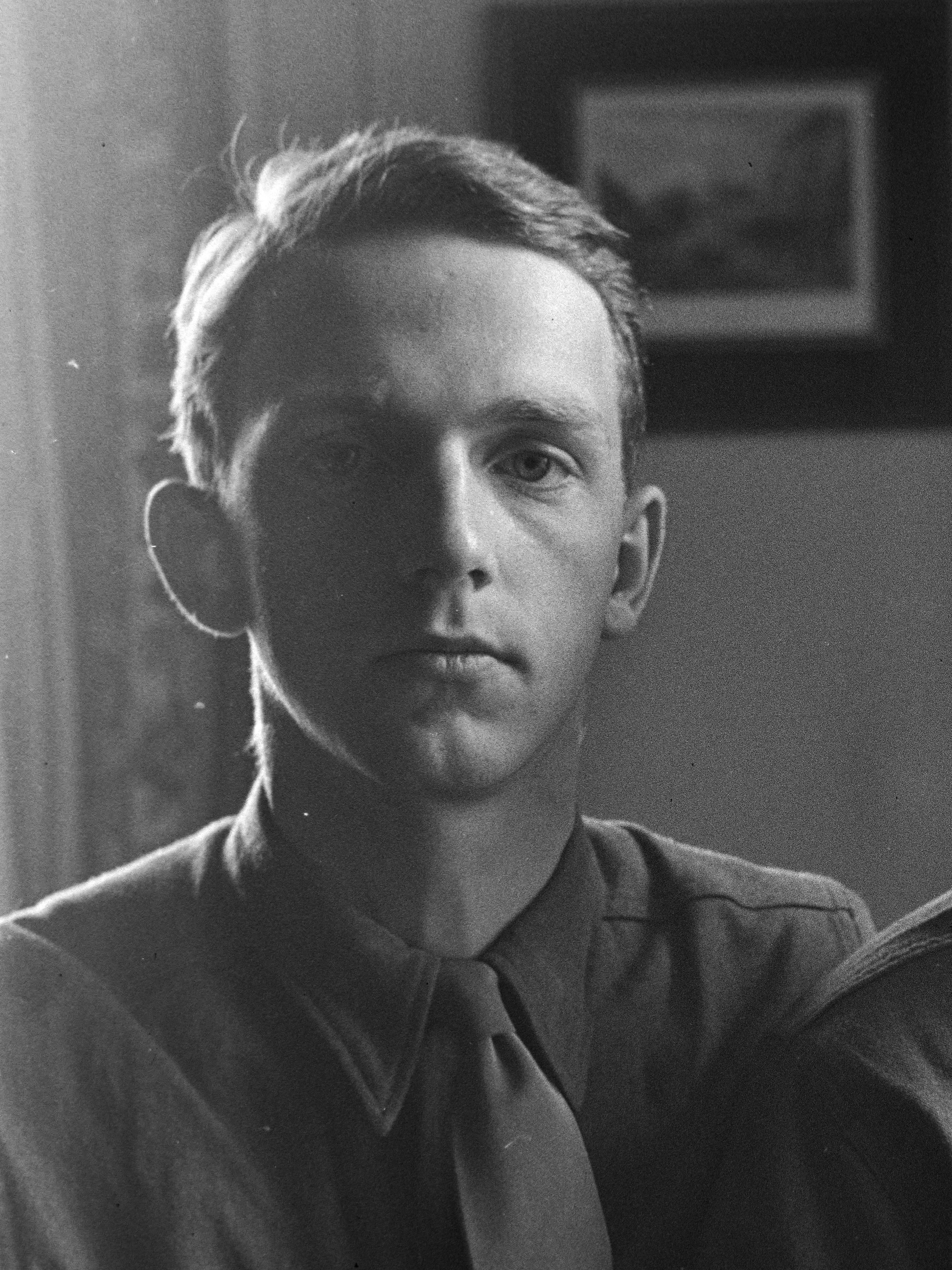
- Rudolf in 1941
- Born: 5 September 1919; Prangins, Switzerland
- Died: 15 May 2010 (aged 90); Brussels, Belgium
- Burial: Muri Abbey, Switzerland
- Spouse: Countess Xenia Czernichev-Besobrasov (m. 1953; died 1968) Anna Gabriele von Wrede (m. 1971)
- Issue: Maria-Anna Galitzine; Karl Peter; Simeon von Habsburg; Johannes Karl; Catharina-Maria
Names
- Rudolf Syringus Peter Karl Franz Joseph Robert Otto Antonius Maria Pius Benedikt Ignatius Laurentius Justiniani Marcus d'Aviano
- House: Habsburg-Lorraine
- Father: Charles I of Austria
- Mother: Princess Zita of Bourbon-Parma

Archduke Rudolf of Austria (5 September 1919 – 15 May 2010) was the sixth child and youngest son of Emperor Charles I of Austria and Zita of Bourbon-Parma.

== Early life ==
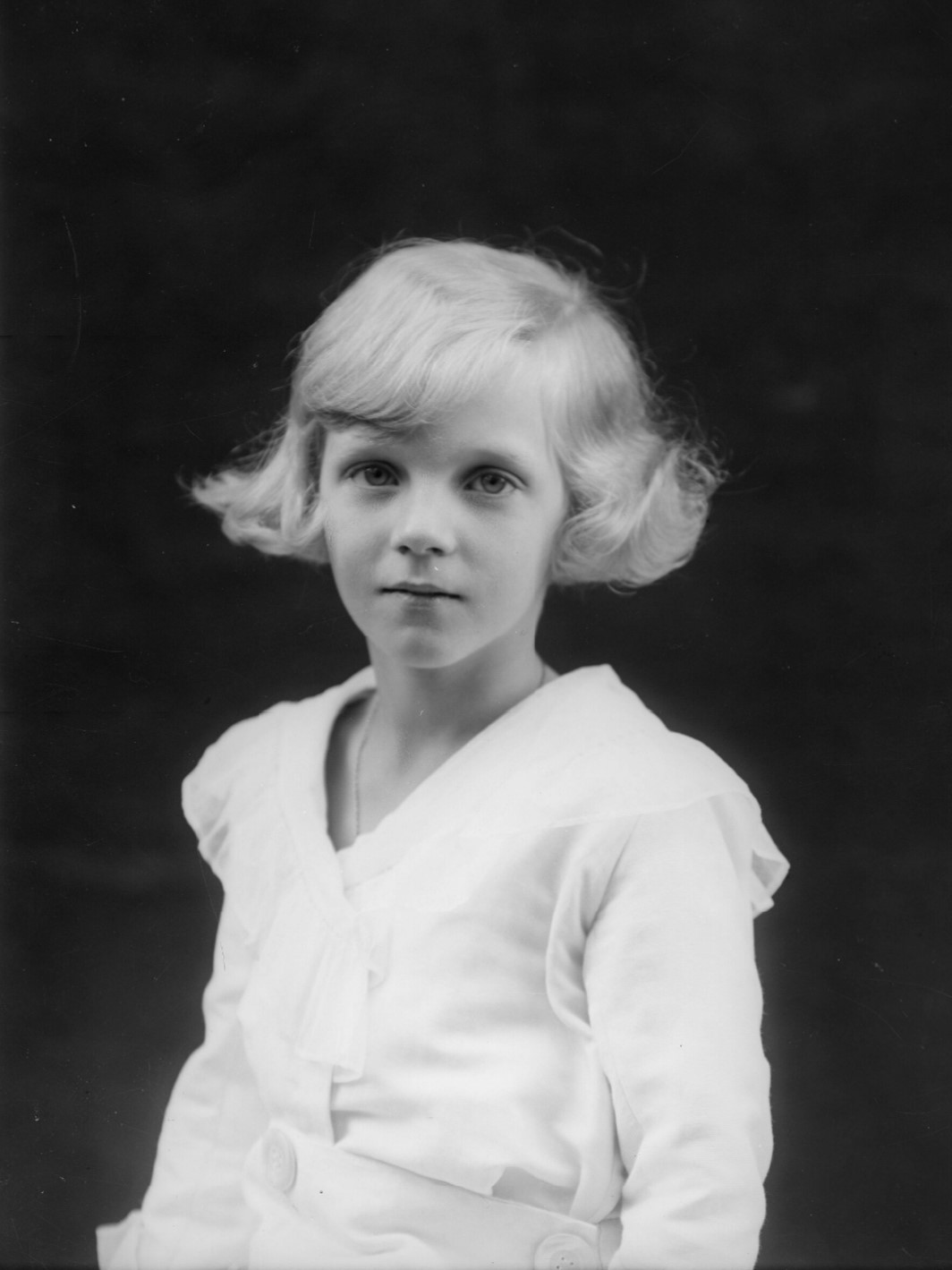
Portrait of Archduke Rudolf in 1925

He was born in Prangins, Switzerland, where the former Austrian Imperial family were staying after they had been sent into exile. He was named after Rudolf IV, Duke of Austria.

Educated with his siblings first in Spain, in Belgium and at the Université Laval in Quebec City, but Rudolf was expelled in 1946 once his membership in the formerly imperial House of Habsburg was exposed due to rumors of him and his brother being part of Austrian resistance. After the war he travelled to the United States, Canada and the Belgian Congo.

Rudolf worked as a Wall Street junior executive and a bank director.

== First marriage ==
Rudolf was married by Blessed Archbishop Fulton J. Sheen to Countess Xenia Czernichev-Besobrasov the daughter of Count Sergei Aleksandrovich Chernyshyev-Besobrasov and his wife, Countess Elizabeta Dmitrievna Sheremeteva, on 22 June 1953 at Tuxedo Park, New York. In 1949, her older sister Irina married Prince Teymuraz Bagration (1912-1992) son of Princess Tatiana of Russia.

They had four children. Xenia was killed in a car crash on 20 September 1968, in which Rudolf was also seriously injured.

- Maria-Anna Galitzine (b. 1954) married Prince Peter Galitzine (b. 1955); on 24 November 1981. They have six children.
- Karl Peter von Habsburg (5 November 1955) married Princess Alexandra Elisabeth von Wrede (12 May 1970), niece of his stepmother Anna-Gabriele. They have two children.
- Simeon von Habsburg (29 June 1958) married Princess María of Bourbon-Two Sicilies (b. 1967) on 13 July 1996. They have five children.
- Johannes Karl von Habsburg (11 December 1962 – 29 June 1975)

== Second marriage ==
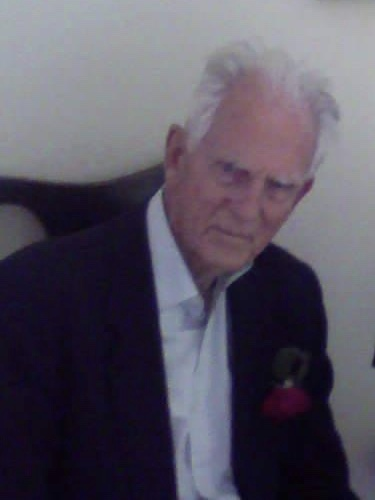
Rudolf in 2008

Rudolf was married secondly to Princess Anna Gabriele von Wrede (11 September 1940), daughter of Prince Carl Josef Maria von Wrede (1899–1945) and his wife, Countess Sophie Schaffgotsch-Semperfrei von und zu Kynast und Greiffenstein (1916–2008) on 15 October 1971 in Ellingen, Bavaria. They have one daughter:

- Catharina-Maria Johanna Zita Sophie Kaspara of Habsburg (14 September 1972) married Count Massimiliano Secco d'Aragona (b. 1967) on 9 December 1998. They have three sons.

== Death ==
Rudolph died on 15 May 2010. He was survived by two older brothers; Otto and Felix.

== Ancestry ==
Ancestors of Archduke Rudolf of Austria (1919–2010)

8. Archduke Karl Ludwig of Austria
4. Archduke Otto Franz of Austria
9. Princess Maria Annunziata of Bourbon-Two Sicilies
2. Charles I of Austria
10. George of Saxony
5. Princess Maria Josepha of Saxony
11. Infanta Maria Ana of Portugal
1. Archduke Rudolf of Austria
12. Charles III, Duke of Parma
6. Robert I, Duke of Parma
13. Princess Louise of Artois
3. Princess Zita of Bourbon-Parma
14. Miguel I of Portugal
7. Infanta Maria Antónia of Portugal
15. Princess Adelaide of Löwenstein
