= San Francisco Fall Antiques Show =

The San Francisco Fall Antiques Show (SFFAS) Changed its name in 2016 to The San Francisco Fall Art & Antiques Show, and then in 2019 to The San Francisco Fall Show. It was established in 1982, making it the oldest continuously operating international antiques show on the West Coast, and is ranked among the top such fairs in the world. It was included in the Robb Report's list of the ten top International Art and Antiques Fairs (Winter 2006). The four-day-long event takes place annually at Fort Mason in San Francisco.

The show features approximately 70 international art, antiques, and design dealers, a Designer Vignette exhibition, a lecture series, Book Signings, and related parties.

The show is prefaced by a Preview Gala, which is considered a prestigious social event in San Francisco and is attended by approximately 3,000 people. It takes place every fall at the Festival Pavilion at Fort Mason Center for the Arts in San Francisco's Marina district.

The SFFAS was founded in 1982 by Toby Rose and Nancee Erickson as the major fundraising event for the non-profit Enterprise for High School Students.

The Show was managed by founder Toby Rose until 2006. Lisa Podos took over as Show Director in 2007 and was followed by Ariane Maclean Trimuschat as Show Director in 2013. The show has an illustrious list of past Show Chairs, a volunteer position. Past Chairman also include Margo de Wildt, Diane Morris Heldfond, Debbie Magowan, Delphine Sloan Damon, Michele Goss and Adrianna Pope Sullivan.

Interior Designer Suzanne Tucker was invited to be Show Chair in 2015 and has held the position since.
