= Countess Xenia Czernichev-Besobrasov =

Franco-Russo-Austrian aristocrat (1929–1968)

Xenia
- Archduchess of Austria
- Born: 11 June 1929; Paris, French Third Republic
- Died: 20 September 1968 (aged 39); Le Gault-Soigny, Marne, Grand Est, France
- Burial: September 1968; Château de Belœil, Belœil, Hainaut, Belgium
- Spouse: Archduke Rudolf of Austria (m. 1953)
- Issue: Maria-Anna Galitzine; Karl Peter von Habsburg; Simeon von Habsburg; Johannes Karl von Habsburg
- House: Chernyshyev-Besobrasov (by birth); Habsburg (by marriage)
- Father: Count Sergei Czernichev-Besobrasov
- Mother: Countess Elizabeta Dimitrievna Sheremeteva

Countess Xenia Czernichev-Besobrasov (Chernysheva-Besobrasova; Russian: графиня Ксения Сергеевна Чернышёва-Безобразова; 11 June 1929 – 20 September 1968) was the first wife of Archduke Rudolf of Austria, the youngest son of the last reigning Emperor of Austria-Hungary, Charles I.

== Background ==
She was the younger daughter of Count Sergei Chernyshyev-Besobrasov (later of New York City) by his wife Countess Elisabeth Dmitrievna Sheremeteva, and has descended from two prominent Russian noble families. Xenia's father, Count Sergei, was a czarist courtier whose father was made a Russian count in 1908 as the son-in-law of the last Count Chernyshev-Kruglikov (that family, now extinct, itself rose to comital status in 1832, by marriage to the heiress of the extinct Chernyshev family, counts in Russia since 1742). Count Sergei fled Russia after the Revolution, and settled in the United States with his wife Elizabeth, his son Alexander, and two daughters Irina and Xenia. In 1949, his older daughter Irina married Prince Teymuraz Bagration (1912-1992) as his second wife, without issue. Teymuraz's mother was Princess Tatiana of Russia.

Xenia was an alumna of Miss Hall's School in Pittsfield, Massachusetts. She then attended Smith College for two years, but did not graduate. At the time of her engagement, she worked for Air France, and was based in New York City.

== Marriage ==
The engagement between Archduke Rudolf and Countess Xenia Czernichev-Besobrasov was announced on 30 April 1953. The couple were married on 23 June 1953 at Our Lady of Mt. Carmel Church at Tuxedo Park, New York, where Rudolf and his mother the Dowager Empress Zita were said to live on a "large estate". The wedding was officiated by Bishop Fulton J. Sheen. Press reports claimed that this was the first imperial marriage in the United States.

Countess Xenia Czernichev-Besobrasov was one of the first non-royal brides to marry into the former Imperial House of Austria in what would be accepted as an equal marriage, despite the relative obscurity of her father's family and the recentness of his title. The Habsburg house laws had been changed by former Crown Prince Otto of Austria in 1953 to permit archdukes to marry outside ruling and formerly reigning houses for the first time, permitting cadet archdukes to marry into increasingly minor noble houses.

== Subsequent life ==
Archduke Rudolf worked at the time of his marriage in a New York City private banking firm. Rudolph and Xenia planned to make their home in New York, but their children were born in various countries, mostly the Belgian Congo.

All three of Xenia's children who lived to adulthood made princely marriages:

- Maria-Anna Galitzine (born 19 May 1954) on 24 November 1981 in Brussels married Peter Dimitrovich Galitzine (born 1955), and has issue.
- Karl Peter von Habsburg (born 13 October 1955) married on 2 May 1998 at Ellingen Castle in Bavaria Alexandra von Wrede (born 1970), a niece of his father's second wife, and has issue.
- Simeon von Habsburg (born 29 June 1958) married on 13 July 1996 María of Bourbon-Two Sicilies (born 1967), daughter of Infante Carlos, Duke of Calabria, claimed Head of the defunct Royal House of Bourbon-Two Sicilies and first cousin to Juan Carlos I of Spain, and of his wife, Anne d'Orléans (daughter of the Count of Paris, pretender to the defunct throne of France). They have five children.

Xenia was killed on 20 September 1968 when the car she was in with her husband collided with a truck. Her husband was seriously injured. She was buried on the grounds of the Château de Belœil in Belgium.

Xenia's widower, Archduke Rudolf remarried Anna Gabriele von Wrede in 1971 and had further issue.
