= List of Austrian flags =

Overview of Austrian flags

This is a list of flags used in Austria. For more information about the national flag, visit the article flag of Austria. For historical flags of Austria-Hungary, see Flags of Austria-Hungary.

== National and state flag ==
State Flag	Date	Use	Description
	1230–1806; 1918–1934; 1945–present	Civil flag and ensign	Three equal horizontal bands of red, white, and red.
	1955–present	State flag, war flag, and naval ensign	Three equal horizontal bands of red, white, and red, surmounted by Austria's coat of arms.
	1945–present	Flag of Austria (vertical)	Same as the national and civil flag but vertical; three equal vertical bands of red, white, and red.

== Standards ==
Flag	Date	Use	Description
	1984	Standard for a Member of the Federal Government or the Federal President	Used only on army occasions (out of use since 1984).

=== Personal standards of emperors ===
Flag	Date	Use	Description
	1804–1835	Standard of the Emperor Francis	
	1848–1915	Standard of the Emperor Franz Joseph	
	1915–1918	Standard of the Emperor & King	Displays both the Imperial crown of Austria and the Royal crown of Hungary.
	1915–1918	Standard of Archdukes and Archduchesses	Displays both the Imperial crown of Austria and the Royal crown of Hungary.

=== Austria under National Socialism ===
Flag	Date	Use	Description
	1938–1945	Flag of the State of Austria (later Alpine and Danube Reichsgaue) within Nazi Germany	Same as the flag of Nazi Germany
	1935–1945	Personal standard of Adolf Hitler, as Führer after the Anschluss.	Served also as a command flag as Supreme Commander of the Wehrmacht.

== Military flags ==
Flag	Date	Use	Description
		Standard for a General of the Austrian Armed Forces	
		Commander pennant	
		Officer pennant	
		Ceremonial flag of the Gardebataillon (Guard of Honour)	

=== Austro-Hungarian Armed Forces ===
Flag	Date	Use	Description
	The flag used by Habsburg forces during the Hungarian revolution of 1848 and 1849.	War flag of the Habsburg Empire	
	1915–1918	Flag of the Generalfeldmarschall (never used)	
	1880–1894	Rank flag for the Habsburg field marshal	
	1880–1894	Rank flag of a Habsburg general	
	1880–1894	Rank flag of a Habsburg lieutenant field marshal	
	1880–1894	Rank flag of a Habsburg major general	

== Naval flags ==
Flag	Date	Use	Description
	1929–1934	State ensign of Austria	
	1934–1938	State ensign of Austria	
	1926–1934 (or 1935)	Naval ensign and jack of Austria	
	1936–1938	Jack of Austria	

=== Austro-Hungarian Navy ===
Flag	Date	Use	Description
	1894–1915 (de facto until 1918)	Austro-Hungarian naval jack	
	1915–1918 (not implemented)	Austro-Hungarian naval jack	
	Stipulated by law in 1915 but never used	Rank flag of the Austro-Hungarian Groß-Admiral	
	Stipulated by law in 1915 but never used	Rank flag of the Austro-Hungarian Admiral	
	Stipulated by law in 1915 but never used	Rank flag of the Austro-Hungarian Vice-Admiral	
	Stipulated by law in 1915 but never used	Rank flag of the Austro-Hungarian Rear Admiral	
	1880–1894	Rank flag of the Habsburg Groß-Admiral	
	1880–1894	Rank flag of the Habsburg Admiral	
	1880–1894	Rank flag of the Habsburg Vice Admiral	
	1880–1894	Rank flag of the Habsburg Rear Admiral	
	1828–1853	Rank flag of the Habsburg Admiral	
	1853–1880	Rank flag of the Habsburg Admiral	

== Police ==
Flag	Date	Use	Description
		River police pennant	

== State flags ==
Civil Flag	State Flag	State	Year adopted	Description
		Burgenland	1971	Two equal bands of red and gold (with the state's coat of arms surmounted on the state flag version).
		Carinthia (Kärnten)	1946	Three equal bands of yellow, red, and white (with the state's coat of arms surmounted on the state flag version).
		Lower Austria (Niederösterreich)	1954	Two equal bands of blue and gold (with the state's coat of arms surmounted on the state flag version).
		Salzburg	1921	Two equal bands of red and white (with the state's coat of arms surmounted on the state flag version).
		Styria (Steiermark)	1960	Two equal bands of white and green (with the state's coat of arms surmounted on the state flag version).
		Tyrol (Tirol)	1945	Two equal bands of white and red (with the state's coat of arms surmounted on the state flag version).
		Upper Austria (Oberösterreich)	1949	Two equal bands of white and red (with the state's coat of arms surmounted on the state flag version).
		Vienna (Wien)	1946	Two equal bands of red and white (with the state's coat of arms surmounted on the state flag version).
		Vorarlberg	1946	Two equal bands of red and white (with the state's coat of arms surmounted on the state flag version).

== Political flags ==
Flag	Date	Party	Description
Current
	2022–present	Austrian People's Party	
	1999–present	Freedom Party of Austria	
	2012–present	The Greens – The Green Alternative	
	2022–present	NEOS – The New Austria and Liberal Forum	
	2004–present	Black-Yellow Alliance	Black-Yellow flag, historical flag of the Habsburg Monarchy
	2000s–present	Identitäre Bewegung Österreich	
	1945–present	Social Democratic Party of Austria	White Three Arrows on a red background
Former
	1933–1938	Fatherland Front (Austria)	
	1930–1938	Ostmärkische Sturmscharen	

== Ethnic groups flags ==
Flag	Date	Party	Description
	1974–present	Armenians in Austria	Flag of the Austrian–Armenian Cultural Society
	Unknown date	Carinthian Slovenes	Flag depicting a shield with the Prince’s Stone
	Unknown date	Burgenland Croats	Austrian flag with Coat of arms of Croatia
	Unofficial	Yenish people	

== Historical flags ==
Flag	Date	Use	Description
	976–1191	Medieval banner of the Margraviate of Austria and early Duchy of Austria under the House of Babenberg	
	1191–1804	Flag of the late Duchy and Archduchy of Austria	
	1685–1740	Flag of the late Duchy and Archduchy of Austria	A yellow field with a black double-headed eagle with a crown on top and carrying the tricolored arms of Austria on his chest.
	1749–1786	Merchant flag of the Archduchy of Austria	
	1804–1918	Flag of the Austrian Empire	Flag of the Habsburg monarchy and also the flag of the Austrian Empire; from the Austro-Hungarian Compromise of 1867, flag of Cisleithanian Austria. Sometimes used as the unofficial national flag of Austria-Hungary.
	1869–1918	Unimplemented naval ensign	
	1869–1918	Merchant ensign of Austria-Hungary	
	1919–1934	State flag of the First Austrian Republic	Same as the modern Austrian flag, but without the broken chains
	1934–1938	State flag of the Federal State of Austria	This is the state flag of Austria adopted in 1934 and used until Austria was incorporated into Germany from 1938 to 1945. This flag was used during the regime of the Fatherland Front's one-party state.

=== Flag of subdivisions of Austria-Hungary ===
Kingdom of Bohemia

Duchy of Bukovina

Duchy of Carinthia

Duchy of Carniola

Kingdom of Dalmatia

Kingdom of Galicia and Lodomeria 1772–1800; 1849–90

Kingdom of Galicia and Lodomeria 1890–1918

Austrian Littoral

Princely County of Gorizia and Gradisca

Imperial Free City of Trieste

Austro-Hungarian rule in Bosnia and Herzegovina

Margraviate of Moravia

Duchy of Salzburg

Austrian Silesia

Duchy of Styria

County of Tyrol

Kingdom of Hungary

Kingdom of Croatia-Slavonia

Corpus separatum (Fiume)

== House flags of Austrian freight companies ==
Flag	Date	Company	Description
	1903–1937	Cosulich Line	
	1829–1993	Donaudampfschiffahrtsgesellschaft	
	1833–1921	Österreichischer Lloyd	

== Yacht clubs of Austria ==
Flag	Club
	Segelclub Mattsee
	Union-Yacht-Club Attersee
