= Flags of Austria-Hungary =

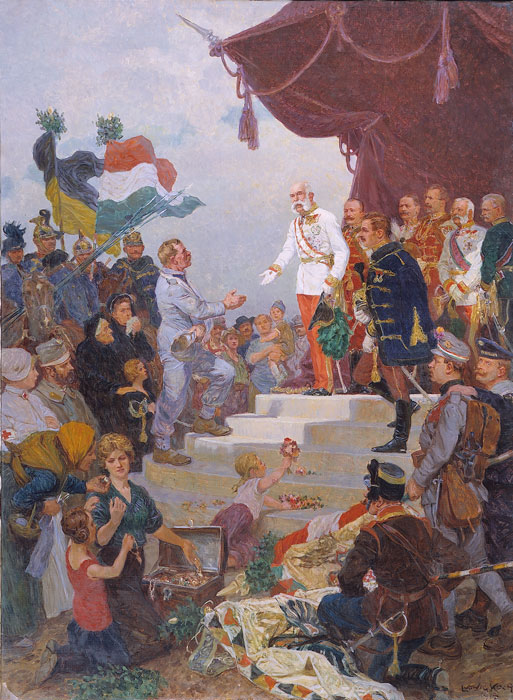
Emperor's Gratitude by Ludwig Koch from 1915. Visible various flags used in Austria-Hungary

The empire of Austria-Hungary (1867–1918) did not have a commonly used universal flag. A single "national flag" could not exist since the Dual Monarchy consisted of two nations brought together by the 1867 Austro-Hungarian Compromise. Additionally, the 1868 Croatian–Hungarian Settlement meant that Croatia and Hungary were entities that legally required separate flags. The only official symbol of Austria-Hungary in common use was the coat of arms.

== Practical use of different flags ==
In a country without an official single national flag, the use of this type of symbol was complicated. In practice, the government and citizens used different flags depending on the regulations, situation, and context:

- The black-gold flag of the ruling Habsburg Dynasty was sometimes used as a de facto national flag. These colors had symbolic importance for the monarchy as the "imperial colors" (reichsfarben).
- At state functions, the Austrian black-gold and the Hungarian red-white-green tricolor were often used to represent the two parts of the empire. In Vienna, in front of Schönbrunn Palace, the black-gold flag was flown for Cisleithania (Austrian half), while both Croatian and Hungarian flags were flown for Transleithania (Hungarian half).
- The Hungarian half of the realm legally had no flag of its own. According to the 1868 Croatian–Hungarian Settlement (art. 62 and 63), in all joint Croatian and Hungarian affairs, symbols of both Croatia and Hungary respectively had to be used. For instance, whenever the joint Hungarian-Croatian Parliament held its session in Budapest, both the Croatian and Hungarian flags were hoisted on the parliament building in Budapest. Hungary proper used a red-white-green tricolor defaced with the Hungarian coat of arms, sometimes used to represent the entirety of the Lands of the Hungarian Crown.
- Separate Austrian and Hungarian teams competed at the Olympic Games, each using their own flag.
  - At the 1912 Olympic Games, a separate Bohemian team competed under two flags: a white flag with the coat of arms of the Kingdom of Bohemia and a black-gold reichsfarben.
- Austro-Hungarian Army carried the double-eagle banners for their regiments they had used before 1867, as they had a long history in many cases.
- Austro-Hungarian Navy until 1918 continued to carry the Austrian ensign it had used since 1786. New ensigns created in 1915 were not implemented due to the ongoing war.
- The Austro-Hungarian merchant navy used a red-white-red civil ensign similar to the navy ensign until 1869, when a new "double" civil ensign was introduced. This configuration further bisected the lower stripe between a left red half and a green right half, with the Austrian and Hungarian coats of arms side by side, representing a combination of the two nations. This ensign was also used as the consular flag, as decreed on 18 February 1869. It came into use on 1 August 1869.
- Embassies flew the imperial standard alongside the black-and-gold flag of Austria and the red-white-green flag of Hungary.
- Legations flew the black-and-gold flag of Austria alongside the red-white-green flag of Hungary.
- Consulates flew the consular flag with a design identical to the "double" civil ensign.
- Cisleithanias crown lands and Transleithanias crown lands had their own regional flags used locally.
- In addition, for various purposes were also used unofficial flags, such as the Hungarian tricolor civil ensign on Transleithania inland waters

== Flags ==
=== National and state flags ===
Flag of the Habsburg Monarchy (including the Austrian and Austro-Hungarian Empires), also used to represent Cisleithania
Flag of the Kingdom of Hungary also used to represent Transleithania

Flag of the Kingdom of Hungary (coat of arms variant without supporters)

Flag of the Kingdom of Hungary (simplified)
Flag of the Kingdom of Croatia-Slavonia

Unofficial, (Note: The official version prescribed the Crown of St. Stephen, the same as on the Hungarian flag, to be used. See Kingdom of Croatia-Slavonia: Symbols) but common flag of the Kingdom of Croatia-Slavonia

Flag of the Kingdom of Croatia-Slavonia (simplified)

=== Imperial and military standards ===
Emperor's imperial standard (until 1915)

Empress's imperial standard (until 1915)

Emperor's and Empress's imperial standard
(1915–1918)

Archduke's and Archduchess's standard (1915–1918).

Military standard (example of many variants)

=== Ensigns ===
==== Civil ensigns ====
Civil ensign 1786–1869

Civil ensign 1869–1918. Commonly mis-referred to as the flag of the empire itself.

Unofficial Hungarian civil ensign used on Transleithania inland waters

==== Naval ensigns ====
Naval ensign 1786–1915
(de facto until 1918)

Naval ensign 1915–1918
(not implemented)

=== Regional flags ===
Additionally, several flags were in use within the local territories of Austria-Hungary.

Cisleithania
Location	Region name	Flag
	Archduchy of Austria (Lower Austria)	
	Archduchy of Austria (Upper Austria)	
	Kingdom of Bohemia	
	Kingdom of Dalmatia	
	Kingdom of Galicia and Lodomeria	(1849–1890) (1890–1918)
	County of Tyrol	
	Duchy of Bukovina	
	Duchy of Upper and Lower Silesia	
	Duchy of Carinthia	
	Duchy of Carniola	
	Duchy of Salzburg	
	Duchy of Styria	
	Margraviate of Moravia	
	Austrian Littoral, including: Imperial Free City of Trieste Princely County of Gorizia and Gradisca March of Istria	(Austrian Littoral) (Imperial Free City of Trieste) (Princely County of Gorizia and Gradisca) (March of Istria)
	Vorarlberg	
Transleithania
Location	Region name	Flag
	Kingdom of Hungary	
	Kingdom of Croatia-Slavonia (1868–1918) including: Kingdom of Croatia (separate until 1868) Kingdom of Slavonia (separate until 1868)	(Kingdom of Croatia-Slavonia) (Kingdom of Croatia) (Kingdom of Slavonia)
	City of Fiume and its District	
Condominium
Location	Region name	Flag
	Condominium of Bosnia and Herzegovina	

== Examples of using flags in the era ==
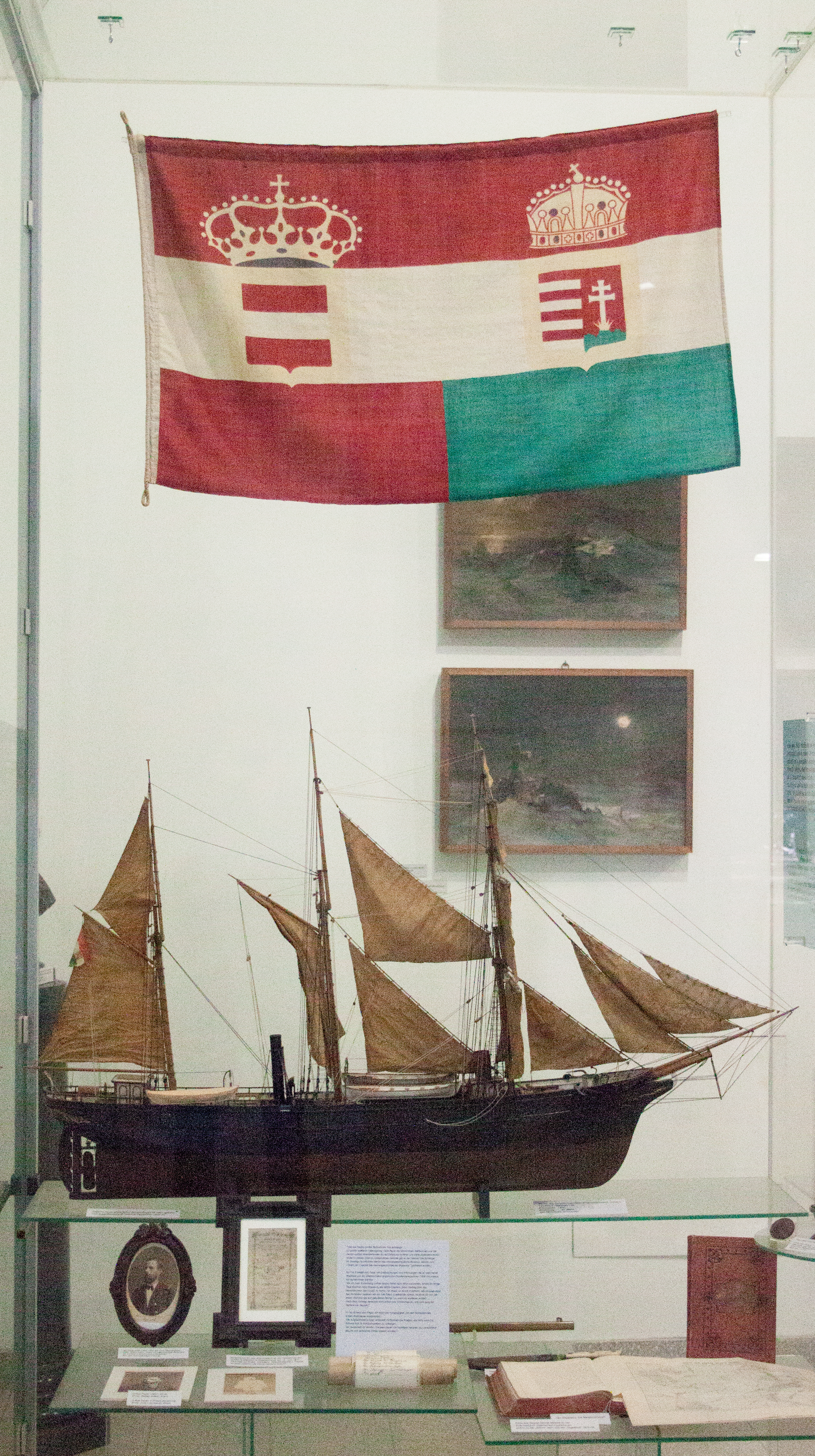
Flag planted by the Austro-Hungarian North Pole expedition (1874)

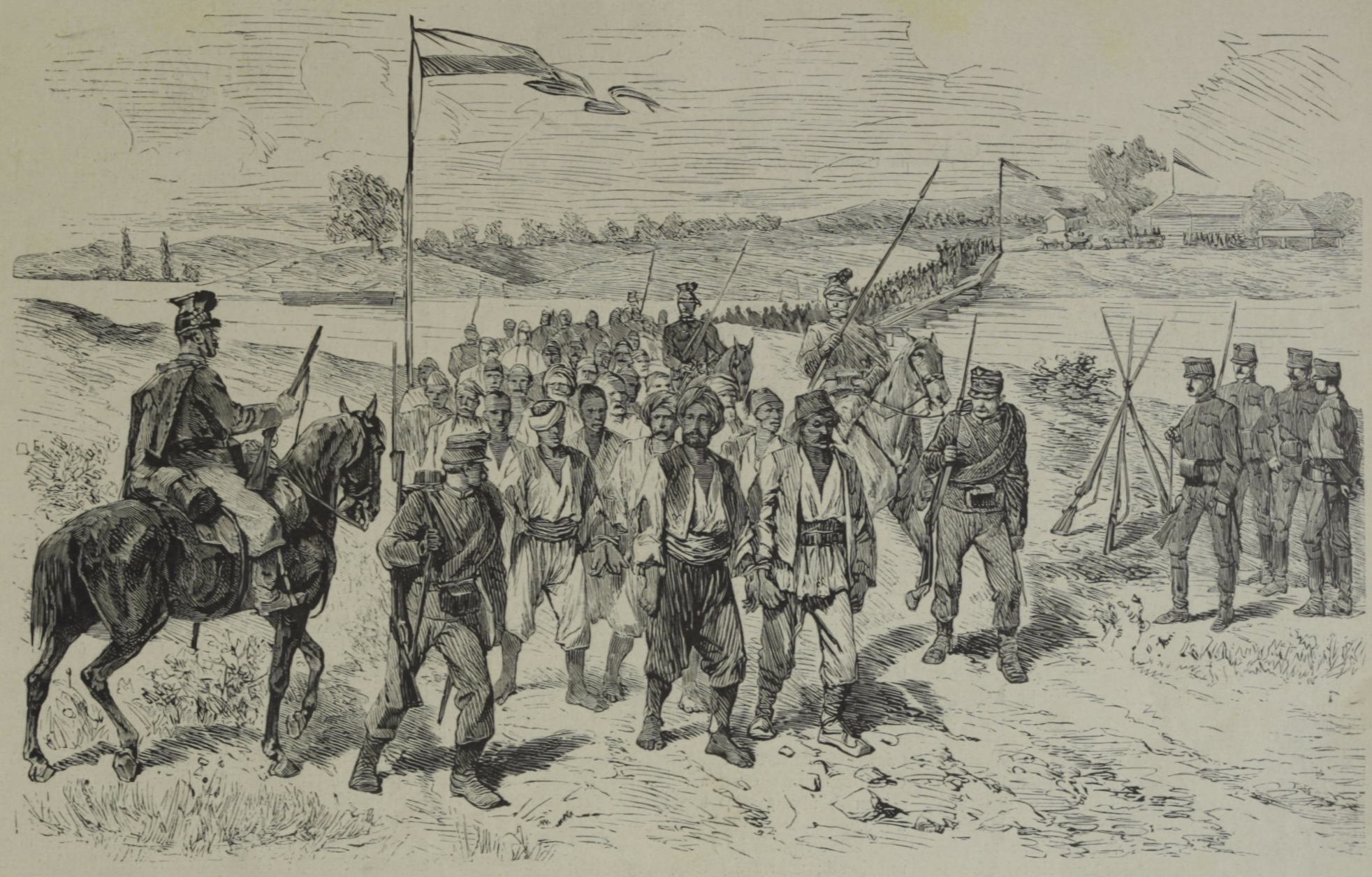
Transport of the Turkish prisoners of war at Austro-Hungarian campaign in Bosnia and Herzegovina (1878) (two-color flag) (Note: Neue Illustrirte Zeitung (No. 3, 13 October 1878, Vienna))

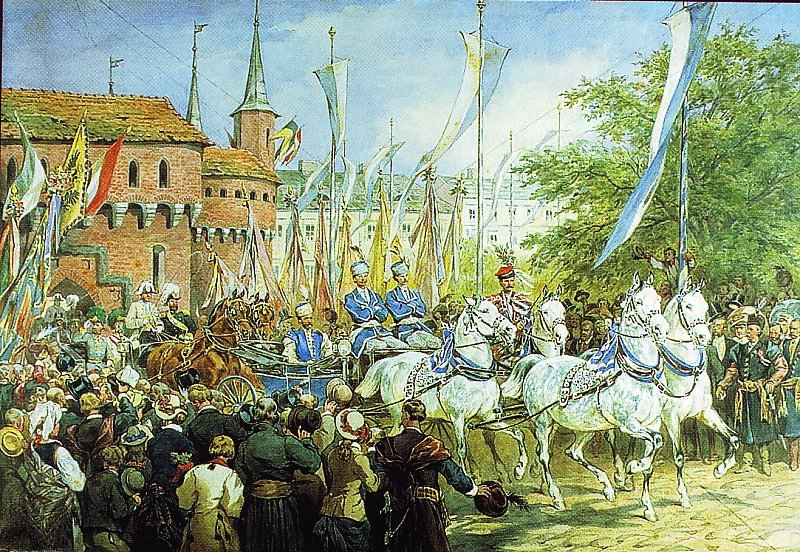
Visit of Emperor Franz Joseph I in Kraków, visible unidentified red-white flag, (Note: Possibility referring to Polish national colors.) regional white-blue city flags, imperial standard and black-gold flag, 1880

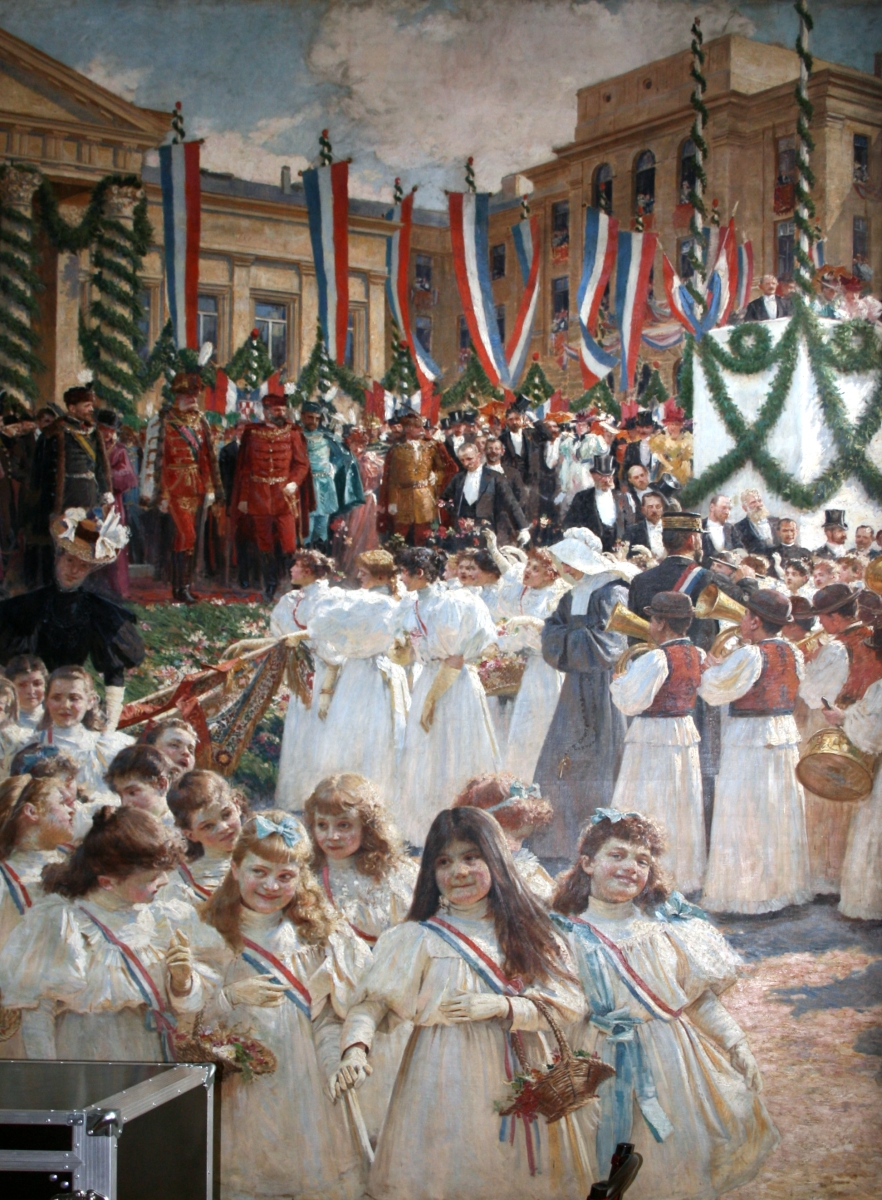
Visit of Emperor Franz Joseph I in Zagreb, red-white-blue (Croatian) flags, 1895

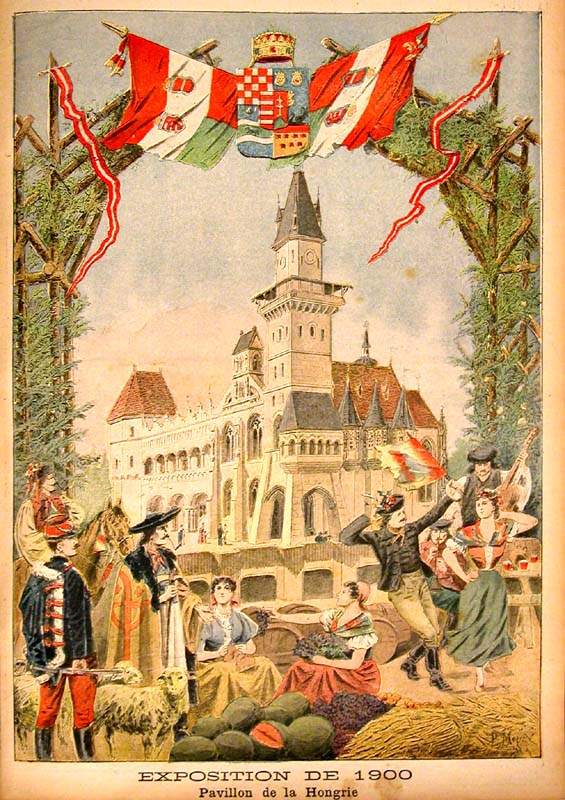
Civil ensign and Austrian pennants on a French illustration advertising the Hungarian pavilion during Exposition Universelle in Paris, 1900

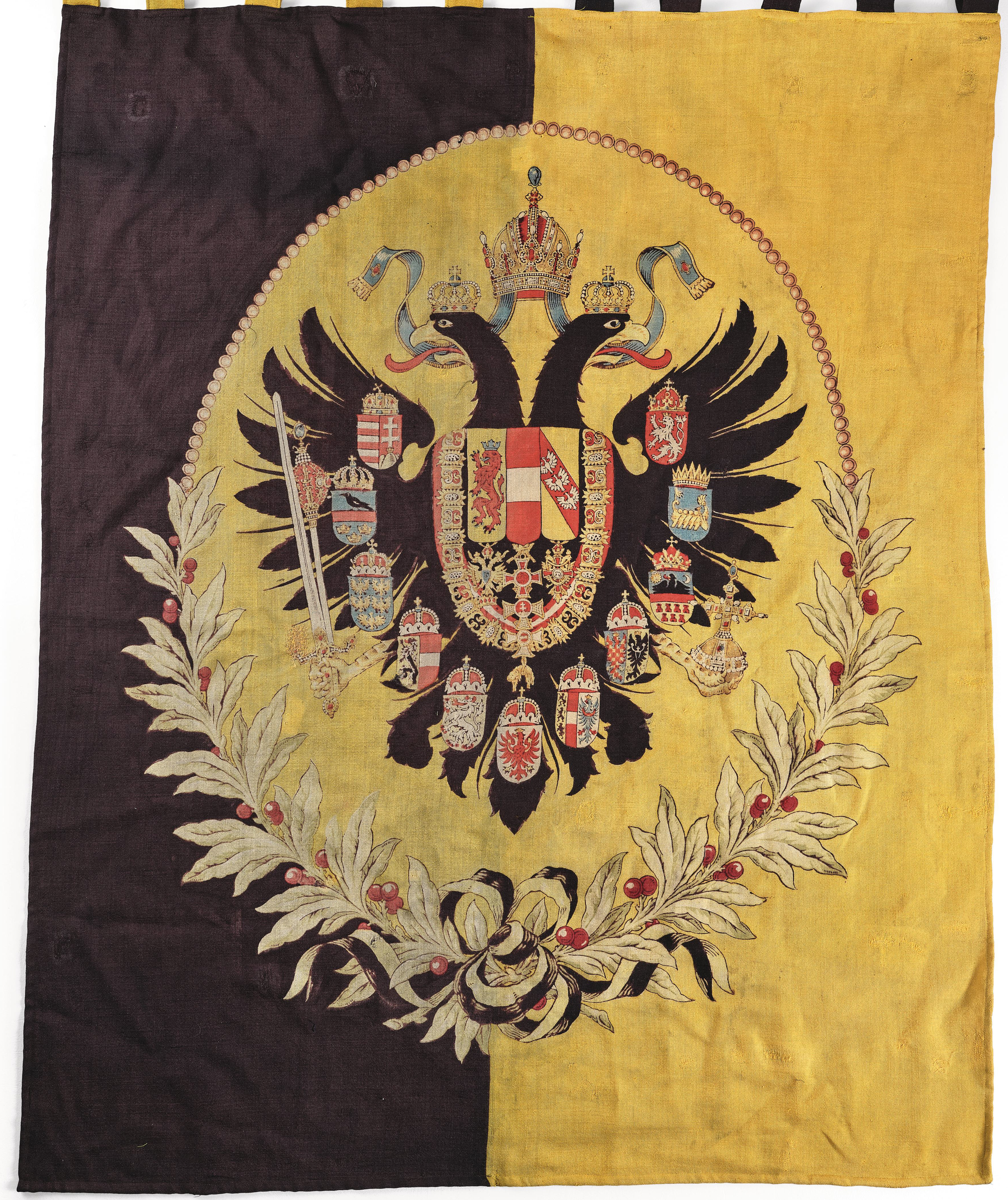
Black-gold flag with coat of arms of Austria-Hungary, 1900

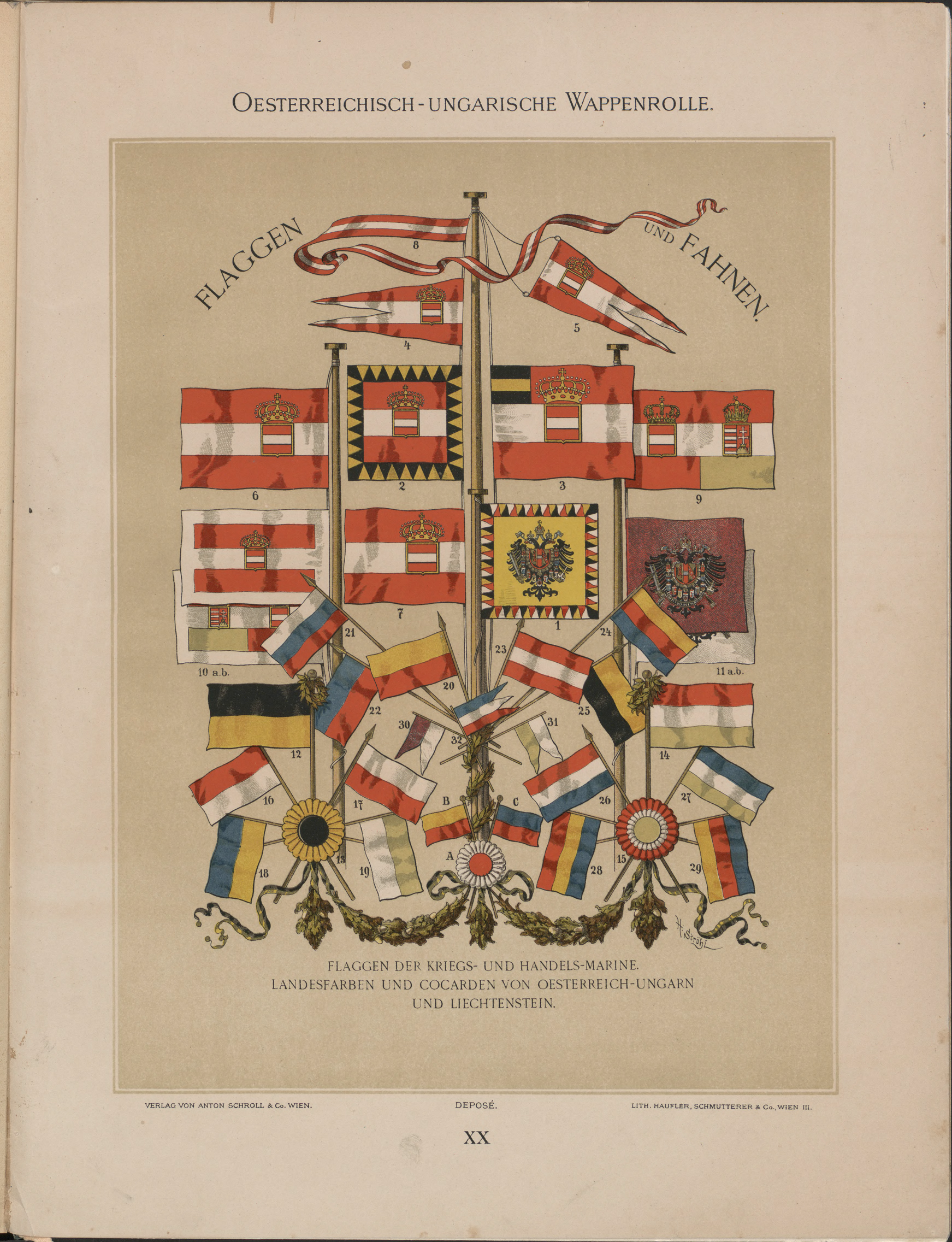
Flags and banners from Hugo Gerard Ströhl's "Oesterreichisch-Ungarische Wappenrolle", 1900

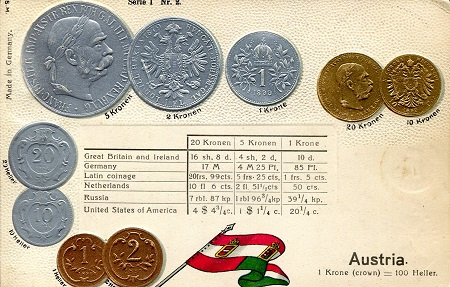
Numismatic postcard designed by German businessman (Hugo Semmler) from 1900 with the Civil Ensign

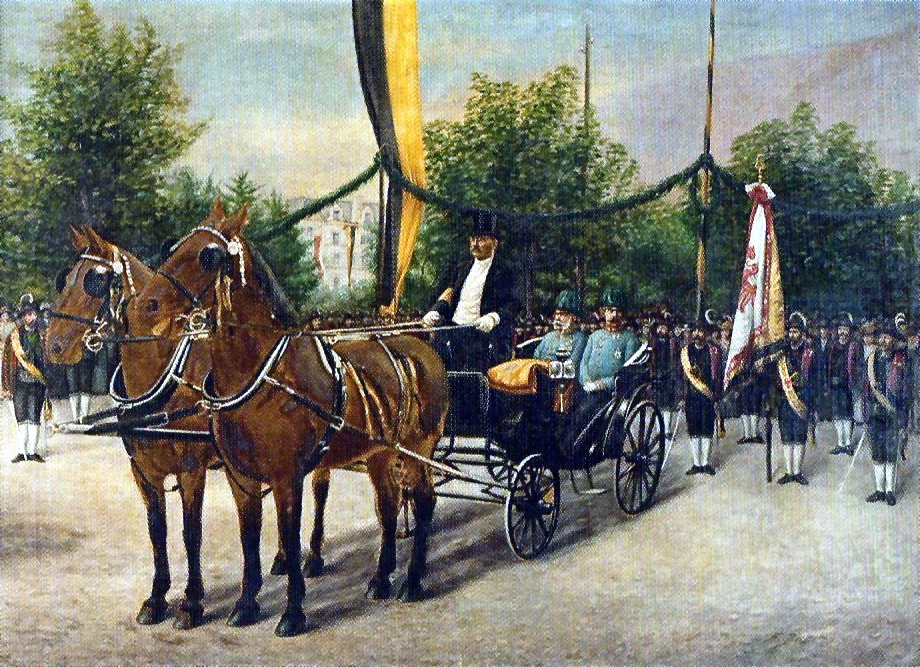
Emperor Franz Joseph I in Merano (black-gold flag), 1900

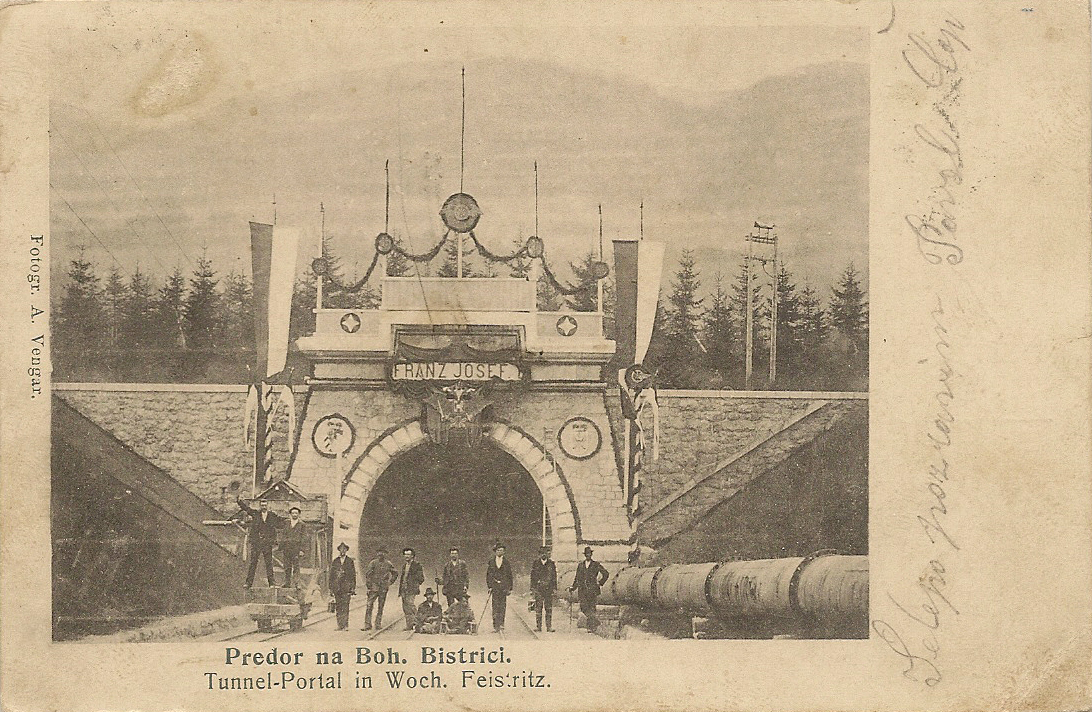
Bohinj tunnel opening ceremony (two-color flags), 1906

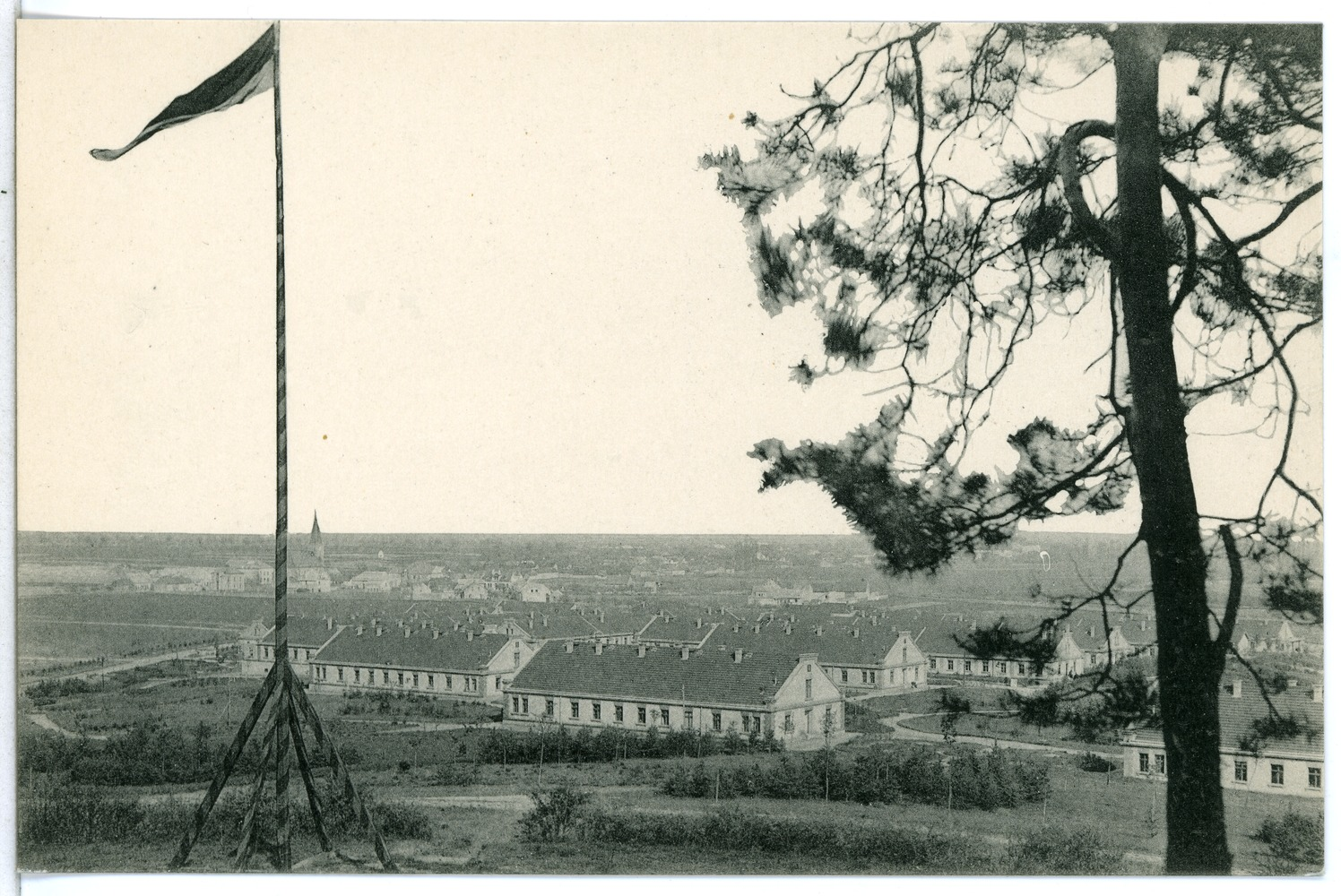
Military base of Austro-Hungarian Army (two-color flag), 1910

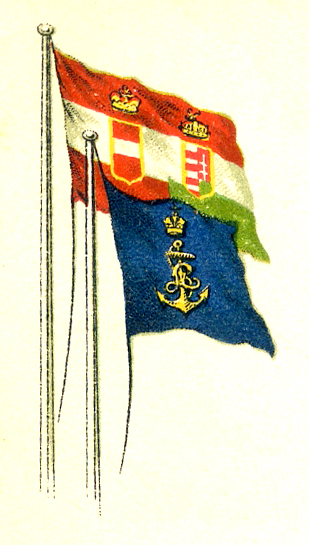
Poster from Österreichischer Lloyd showing the civil ensign and the company's logo on a navy blue flag, 1910

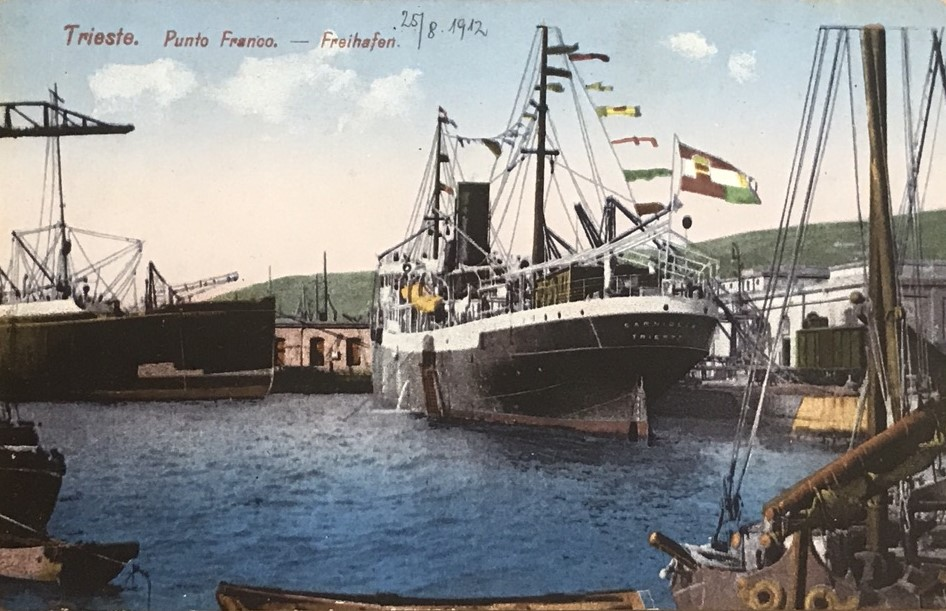
SS Carniola - Austro-Hungarian civilian steamship with civil ensign, 1912

1912 Summer Olympics poster, visible black-gold and red-white-green flags

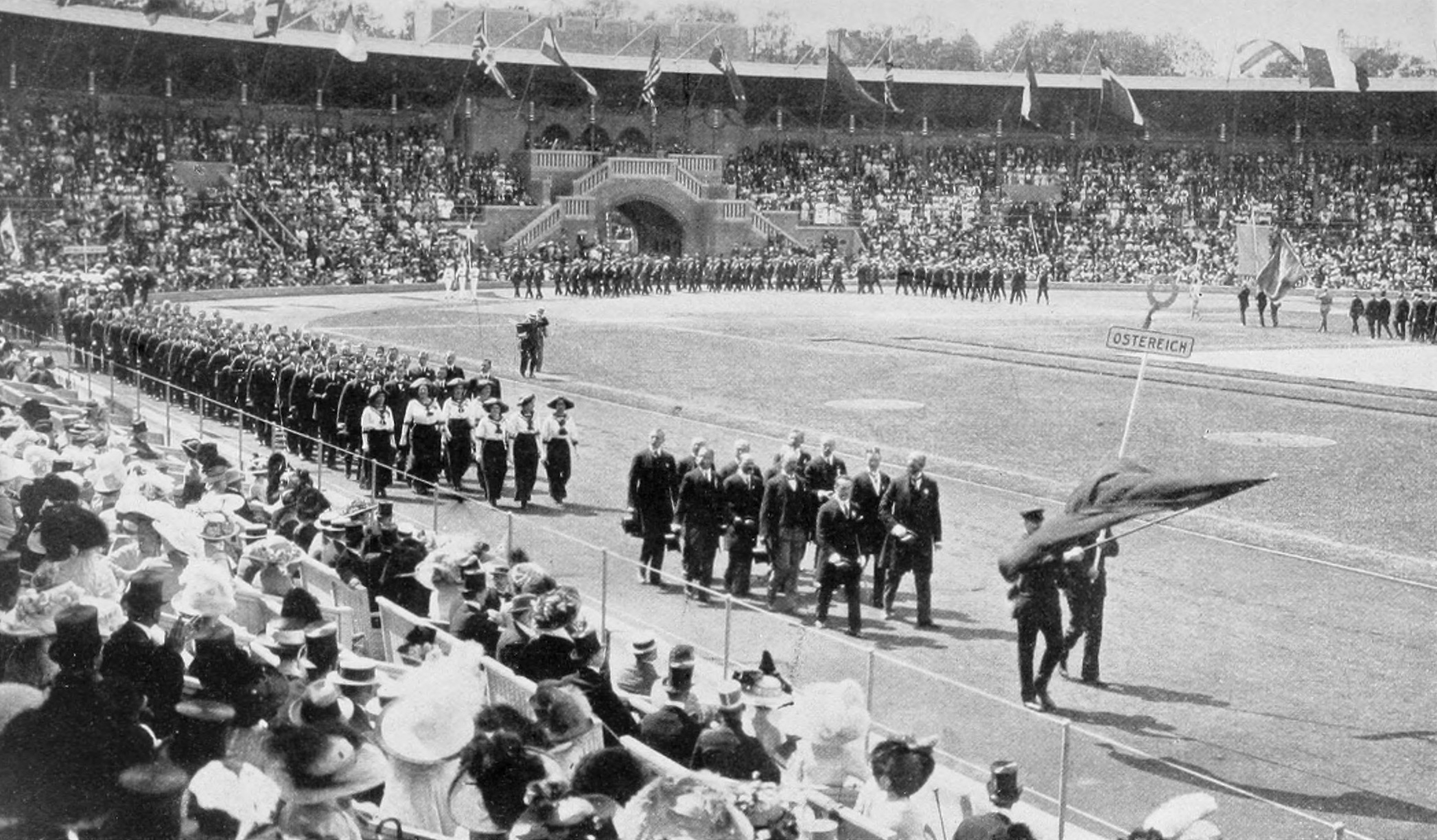
Separate Austrian team at the 1912 Summer Olympics with unidentified flag

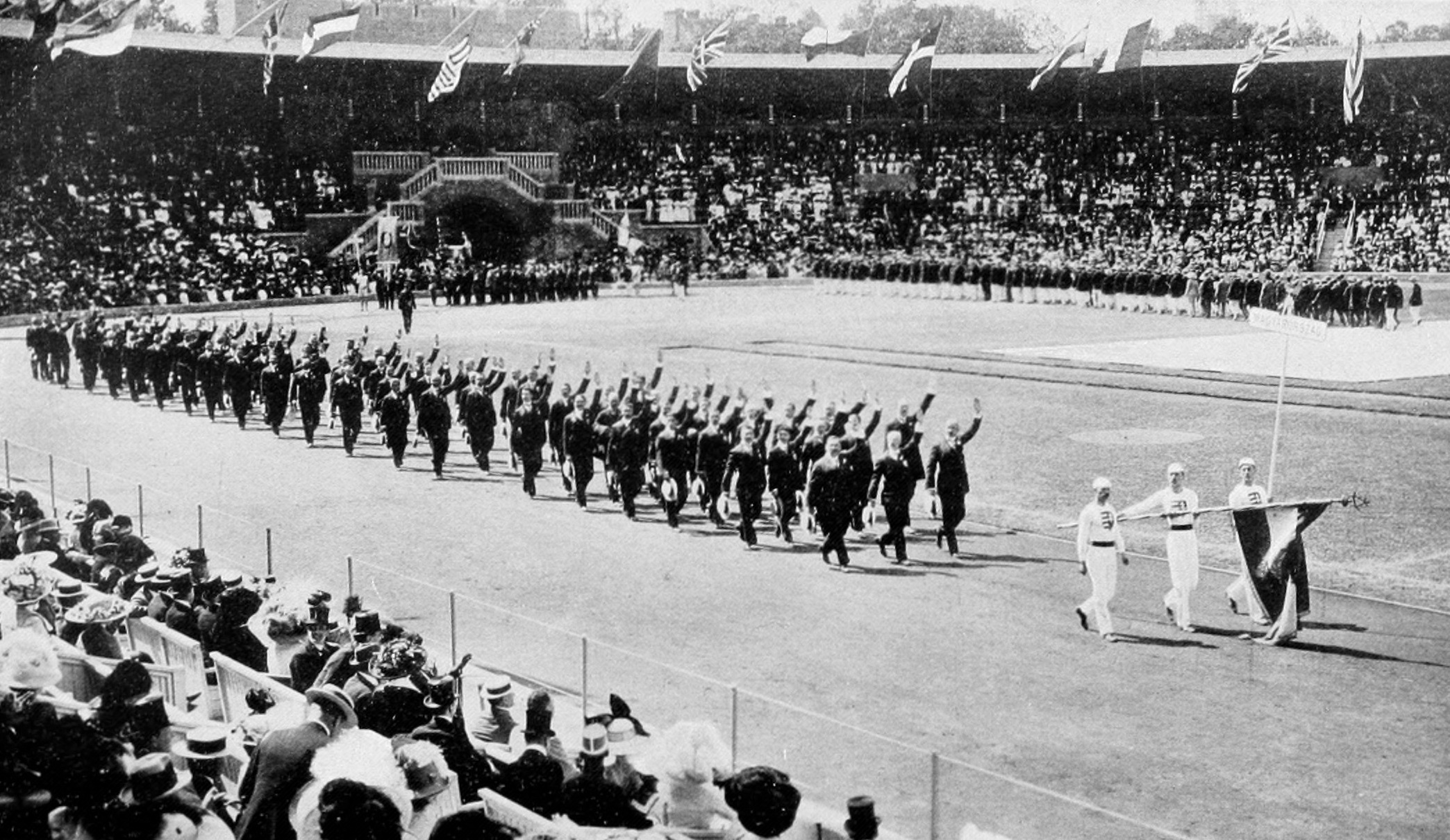
Separate Hungarian team at the 1912 Summer Olympics with Hungarian three-color flag

Separate Bohemian team at the 1912 Summer Olympics with two flags: white flag with the coat of arms of the Kingdom of Bohemia and a black-gold reichsfarben.

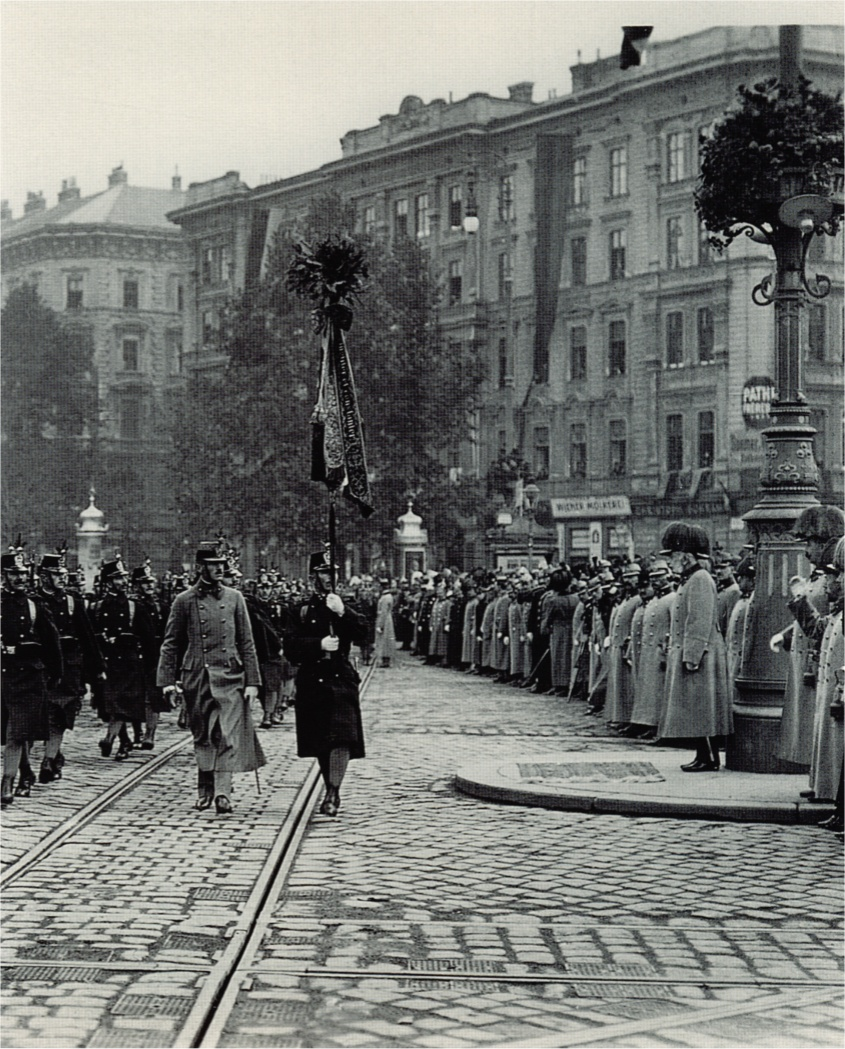
Military parade in Vienna (two-color flags), 1913

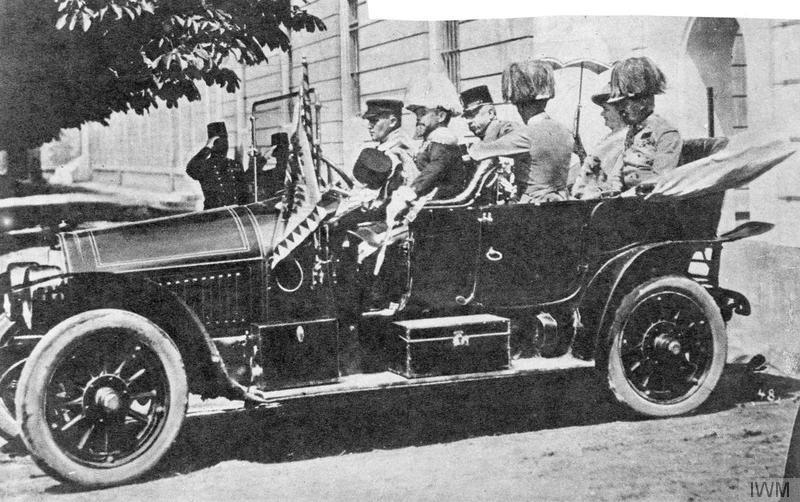
Imperial Standard on the car of Archduke Franz Ferdinand, at the day of his assassination, 1914

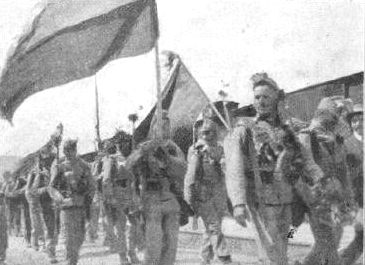
Soldiers of Infanterieregiment Nr. 17 with two-color flag, 1914

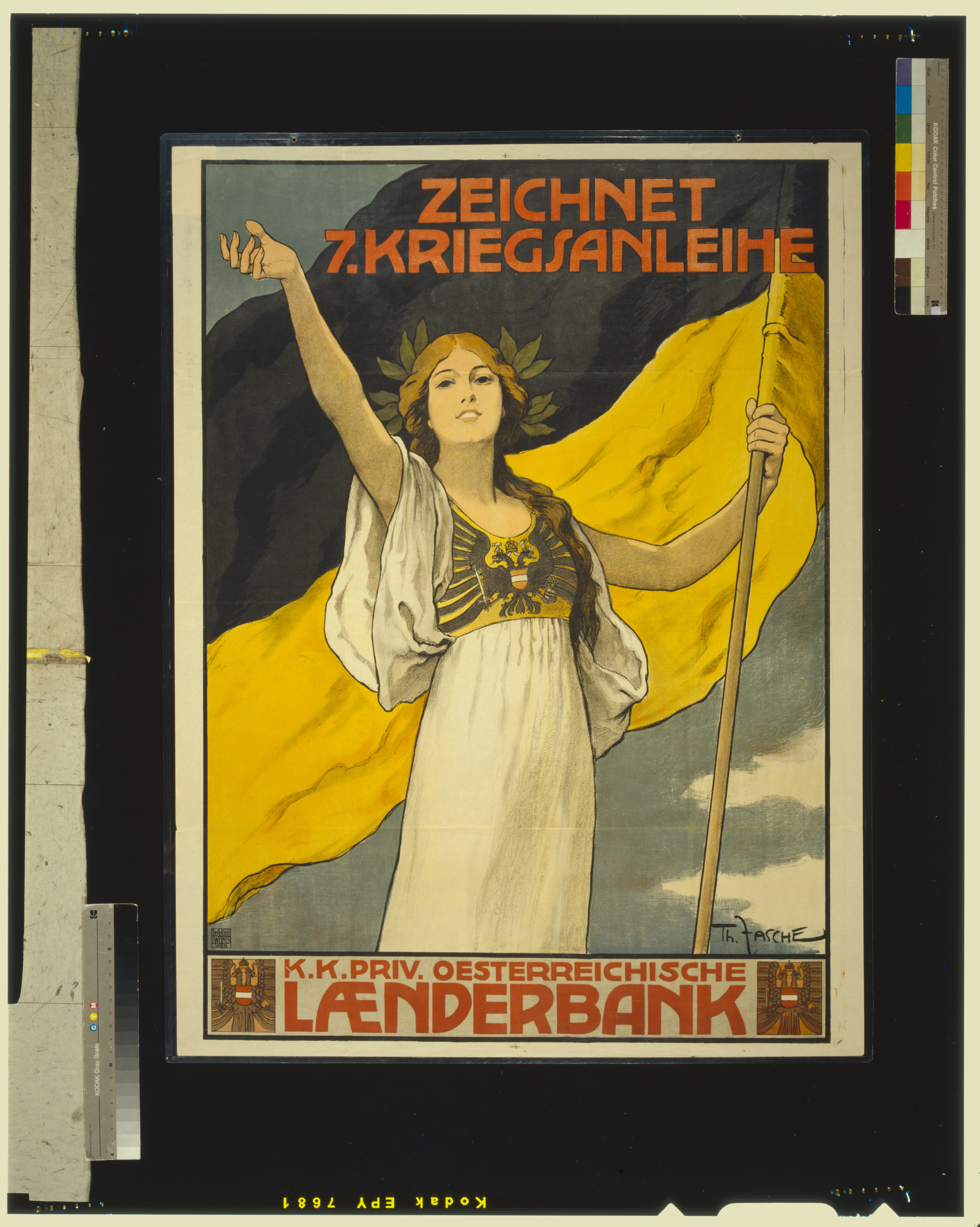
Austro-Hungarian propaganda poster encouraging to buy war bonds

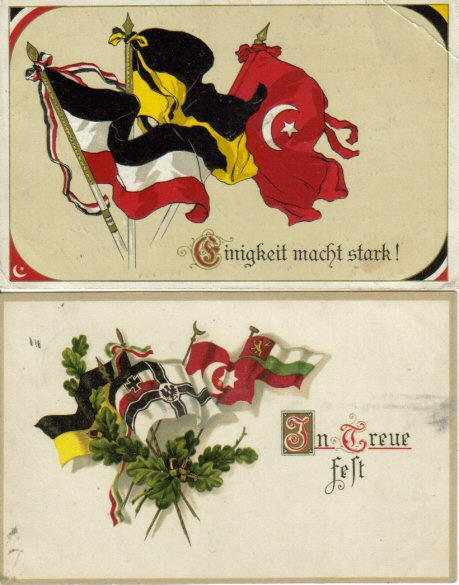
World War I-era propaganda postcards depicting the flags of the Central Powers. The Austro-Hungarian flag shown as black-gold

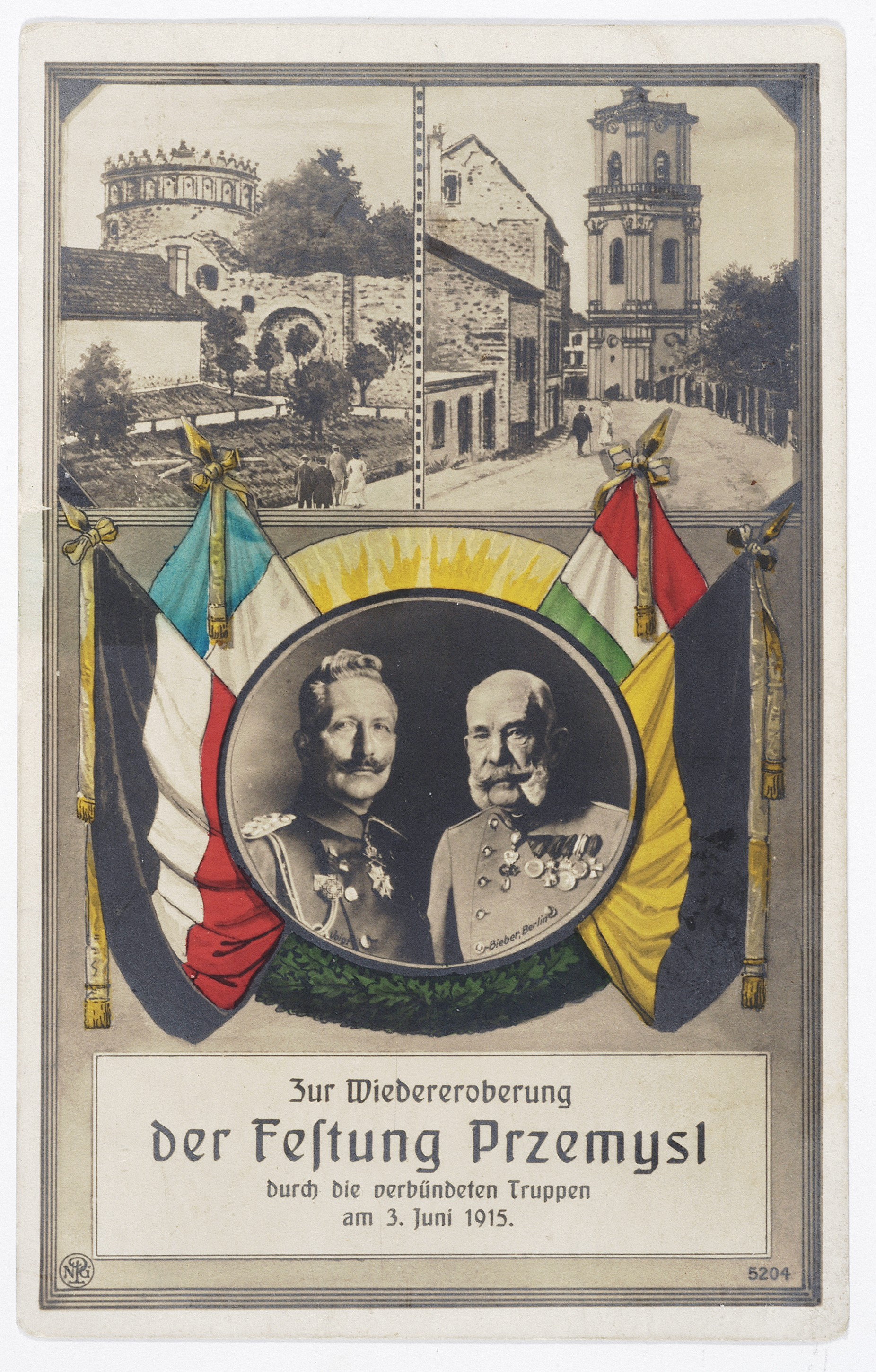
A propaganda postcard commemorating the release of the Przemyśl fortress. Austria-Hungary represented by the black-gold and red-white-green flags, 1915

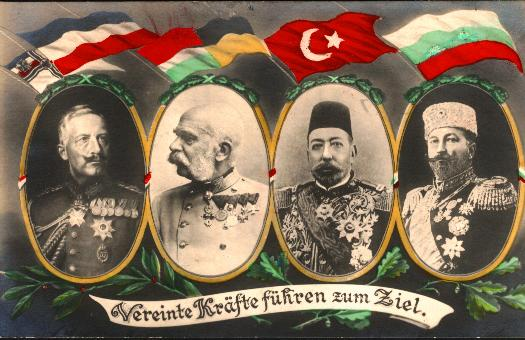
Another Central Powers propaganda, with Austria-Hungary being represented by a mix of both Habsburg and Hungarian flags

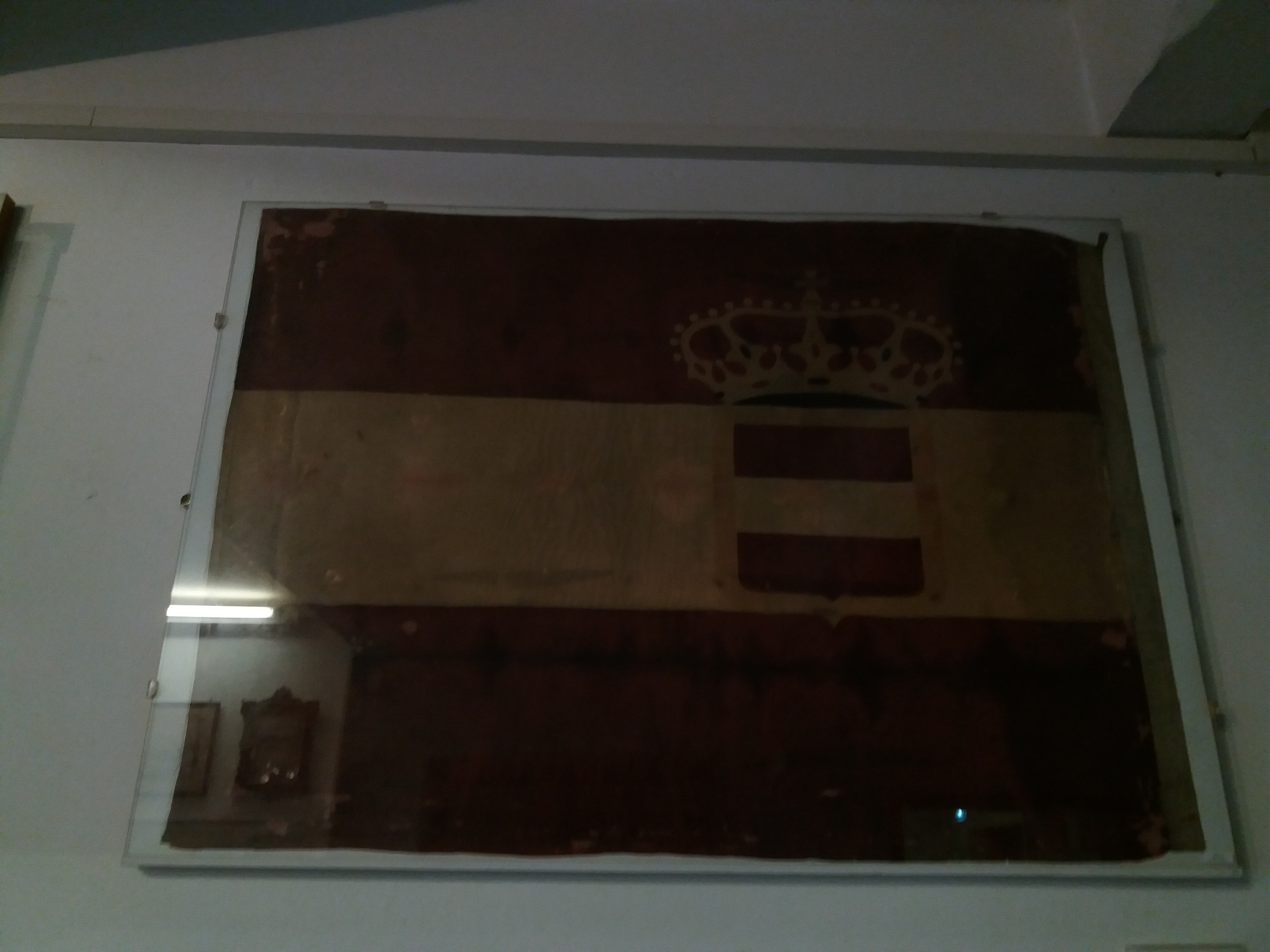
Copy of the naval ensign taken by the Italian army from the submarine U12 at the Piave river mouths on 5 August 1915 (exposed in Museo Storico Navale, Venice).

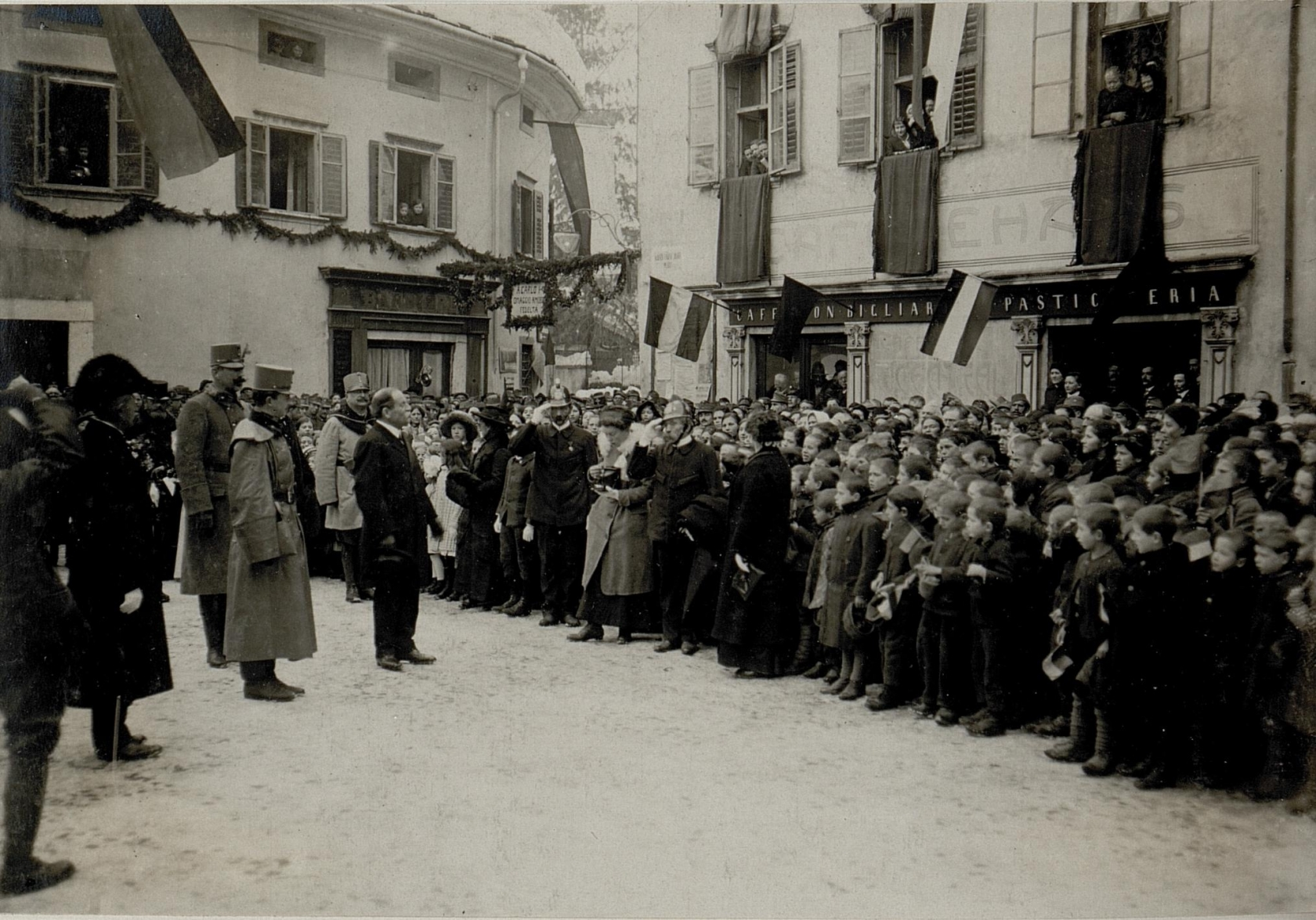
Emperor Charles I visiting Pergine (two- and three-color flags), 1917

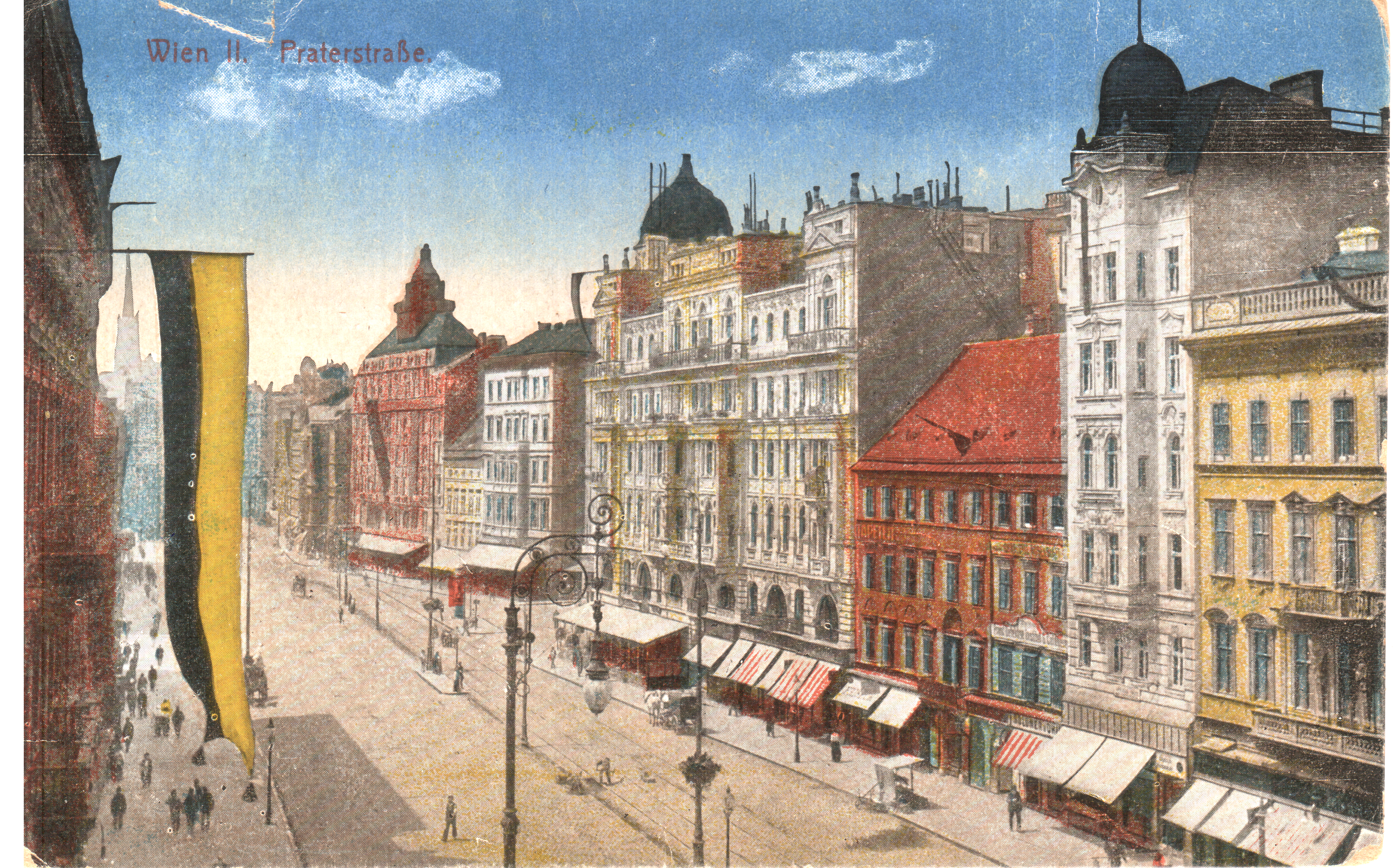
Vienna Praterstrasse, 1917

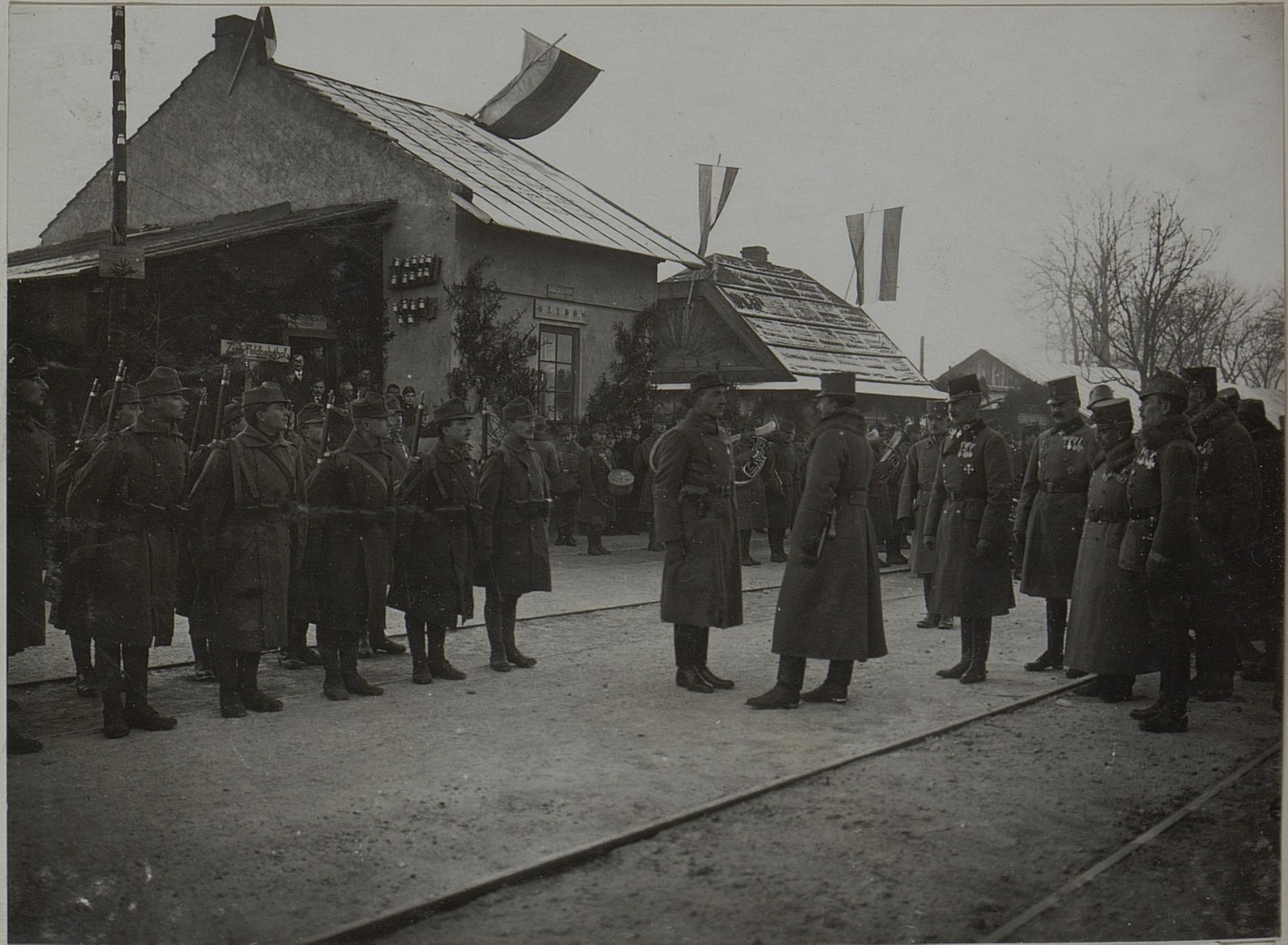
Emperor Charles I visiting troops in Ozhydiv (two- and three-color flags), 1917

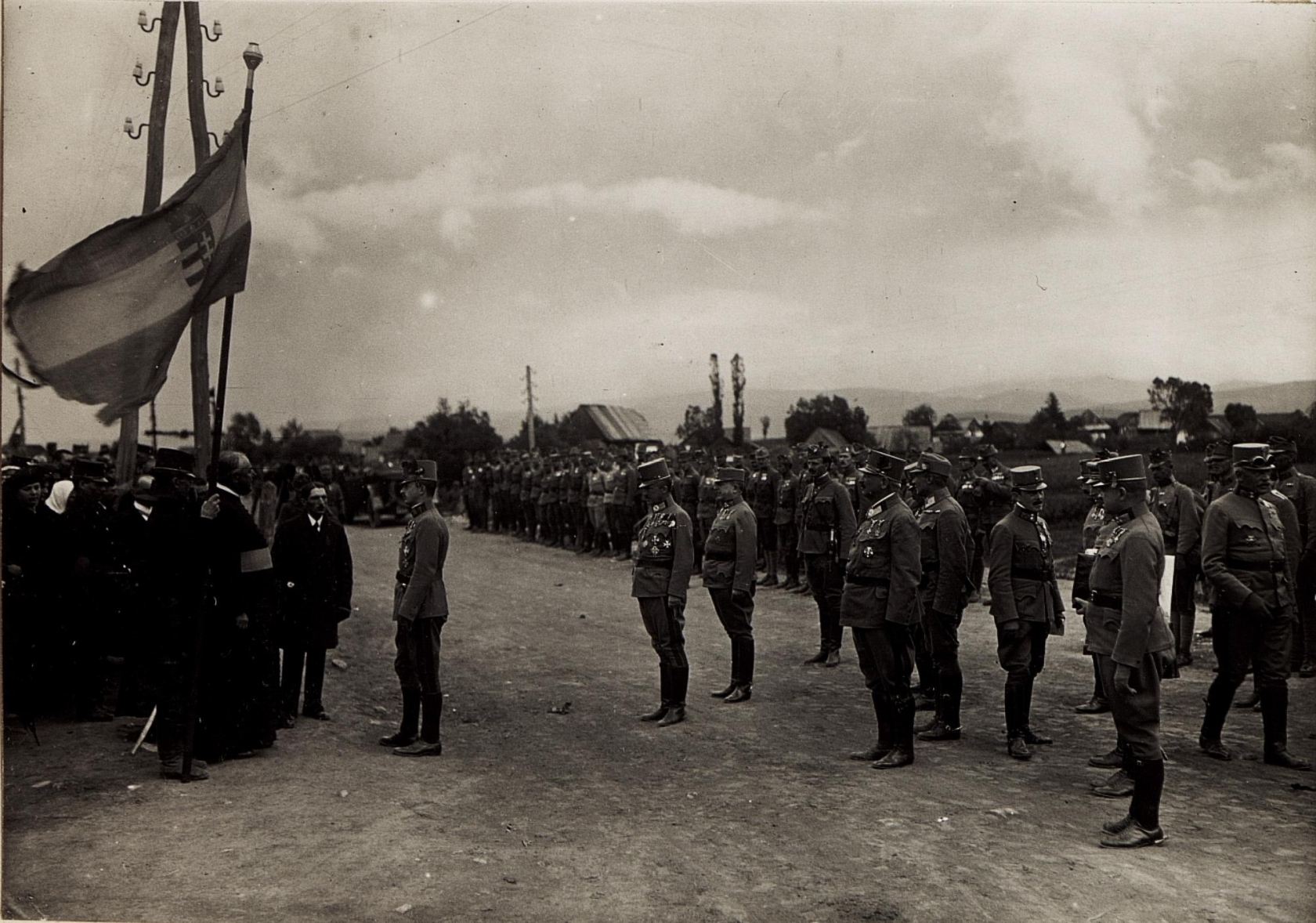
Emperor Charles I in front of the Hungarian flag, 1917

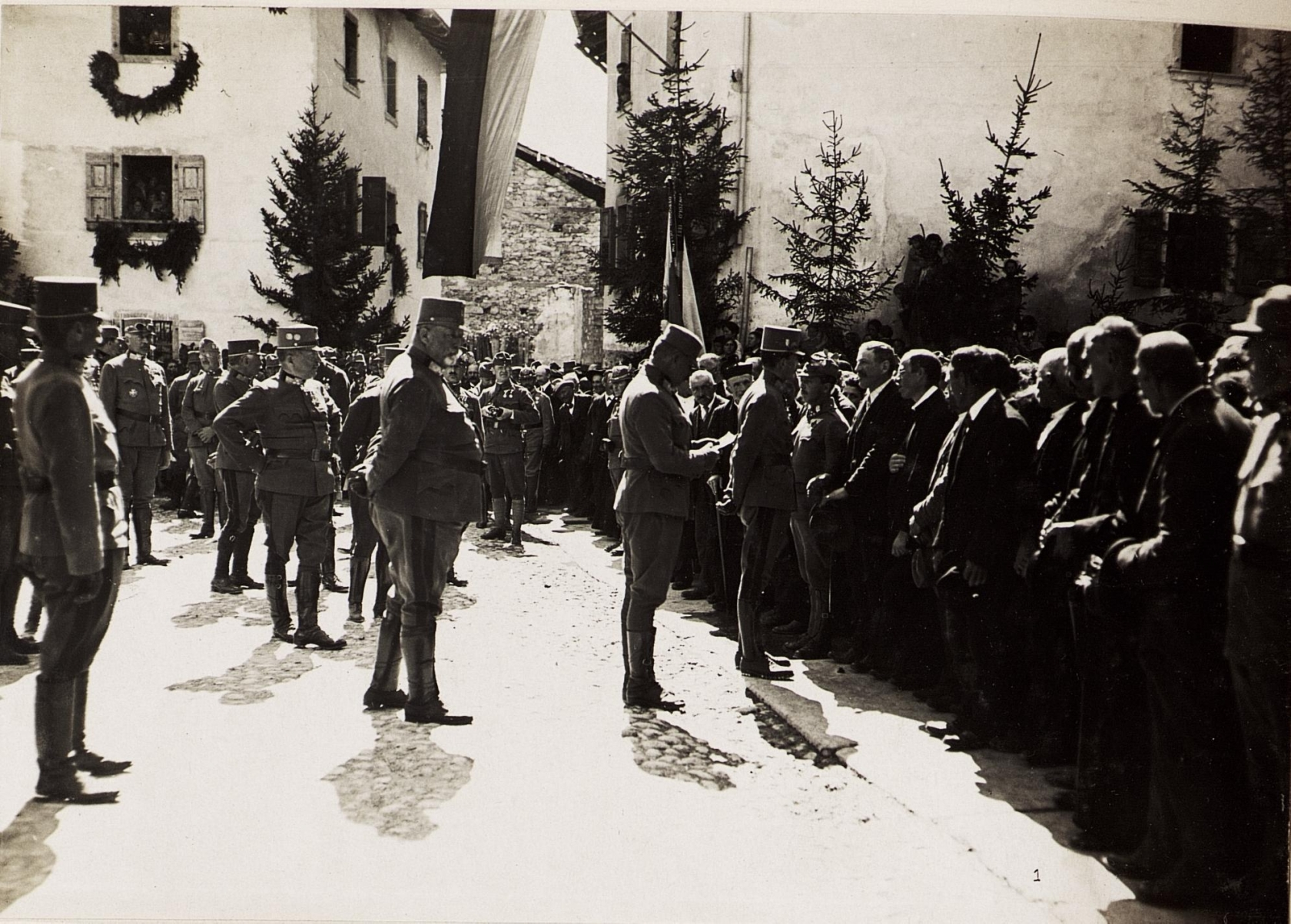
Emperor Charles I visiting one of the villages in South Tyrol (two-color flag), 1917

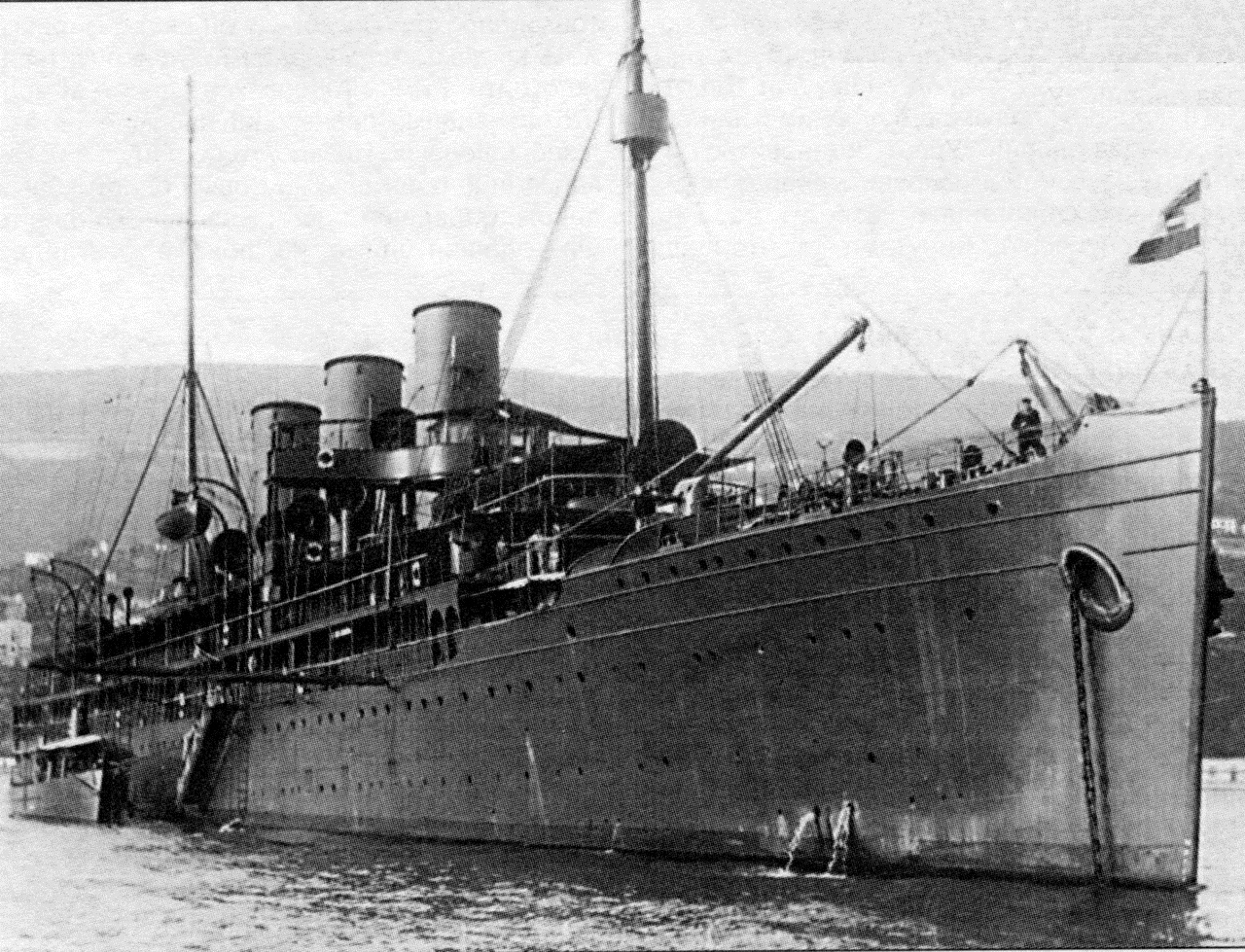
SMS Gäa - Austro-Hungarian torpedo carrier with naval ensign, World War I period

== See also ==
- Coat of arms of Austria-Hungary
