= Austrian–Armenian Cultural Society =

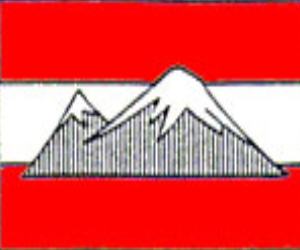
Austrian Armenian Cultural Society

The Austrian Armenian Cultural Society was founded in 1974 at Vienna, Austria. The Austrian–Armenian Cultural Society is an organization that promotes cultural ties between Armenia and Austria and a lot more. Its main goal is to introduce Austrians to the Armenian culture and heritage as well as informing Armenians about the Austrian culture and history. The Austrian–Armenian Cultural Society whose members are Armenians as well as Austrians, e.g. scientists, writers, artists, renowned leaders, and more. The organization is maintaining cultural ties to different organizations in Austria, Armenia and the diaspora. Among its many activities, it runs Armenian language lessons, useful programs to Armenia, youth camping events and way more.
