= Coat of arms of Austria-Hungary =

Achievement of Arms of Austria-Hungary from 1915 until 1918.

The achievement of arms of Austria-Hungary was the country's symbol during its existence from the Austro-Hungarian Compromise of 1867 to its dissolution in 1918. The double-headed eagle of the ruling House of Habsburg-Lorraine was used by the common Imperial and Royal (k. u. k.) institutions of Austria-Hungary or the dual monarchy. Additionally, each of the two parts of the real union had its own coat of arms.

As the double-headed eagle was reminiscent of the Reichsadler insignia of the defunct Holy Roman Empire and also the symbol of the Cisleithanian ('Austrian') half of the real union, the Hungarian government urged for the introduction of a new common coat of arms, which took place in 1915, in the midst of World War I. The new insignia combined the coats of arms of the separate halves of the Dual Monarchy, linked by the armorials of the Habsburg-Lorraine dynasty and the motto indivisibiliter ac inseparabiliter ('indivisible and inseparable' Hungarian: oszthatatlan és elválaszthatatlan).

== Common coat of arms ==
Coat of arms	Date	Use	Description
	1867–1915	Lesser common Coat of Arms	Imperial-Royal (k.k.) coat of arms of the Austrian Empire from 1804: the double-headed eagle with marshaled arms of Habsburg, Babenberg and Lorraine displayed on the Escutcheon, Order of the Golden Fleece and Imperial Crown
	1867–1915	Medium common Coat of Arms	With armorials of (counterclockwise): Hungary, Galicia, Lower Austria, Salzburg, Styria, Tyrol, Carinthia and Carniola, Silesia and Moravia, Transylvania, Illyria, and Bohemia
	1915–1916	Lesser common Coat of Arms	Lesser Coat of arms of Cisleithania and Transleithania under the Imperial Crown and the Crown of Saint Stephen resp., linked by the crowned Habsburg-Lorraine armorials, the Order of the Golden Fleece, and the motto indivisibiliter ac inseparabiliter
	1916–1918	Lesser common Coat of Arms	Lesser Coat of arms of Cisleithania and Transleithania under the Imperial Crown and the Crown of Saint Stephen resp., linked by the crowned Habsburg-Lorraine armorials, the Order of the Golden Fleece, and the motto indivisibiliter ac inseparabiliter (same as 1915 version with Croatia added to lesser arms of the Lands of the Crown of Saint Stephen)
	1915–1918	Medium common Coat of Arms	Medium Coat of arms of Cisleithania and Transleithania (see below) with supporters: a griffin in the dexter (for Austria) and an angel (for Hungary) in the sinister.

== Coat of arms of the two constituent countries ==
Coat of arms	Date	Use	Description
	1915–1918	Austria's medium coat of arms	
	1915–1918	Austria's small coat of arms	
	1915–1918	Hungary's medium coat of arms	So-called "angel coat of arms" with coats of arms of Croatia, Slavonia, Dalmatia, Bosnia and Herzegovina, Transylvania, the city of Rijeka and Kingdom of Hungary
	1916–1918	Hungary's small coat of arms	Coats of arms of Kingdom of Hungary and Kingdom of Croatia, two kingdoms that legally made the Lands of the Crown of Saint Stephen

== Regional coat of arms ==
Coat of arms	Date	Use	Description
	1867–1918	Kingdom of Croatia-Slavonia	Coat of arms of the Triune Kingdom
	1867–1918	Kingdom of Bohemia	
	1742–1918	Duchy of Upper and Lower Silesia	
	1867–1918	Kingdom of Dalmatia	
	1804–1918	Kingdom of Galicia and Lodomeria	
	1867–1918	Duchy of Styria	
Duchy of Carniola	1836-1918	Duchy of Carniola	
	1836-1918	Duchy of Carinthia	
	1862-1918	Duchy of Bukovina	
	1867–1918	Margravate of Istria	
	1878–1918	Condominium of Bosnia and Herzegovina	

== See also ==
- Coat of arms of Austria
- Coat of arms of Hungary
