= Flag of the Habsburg monarchy =

National flag

- Use: Civil flag and ensign
- Proportion: 2:3
- Adopted: 1804
- Relinquished: 1918
- Design: A horizontal bicolour of black and yellow.

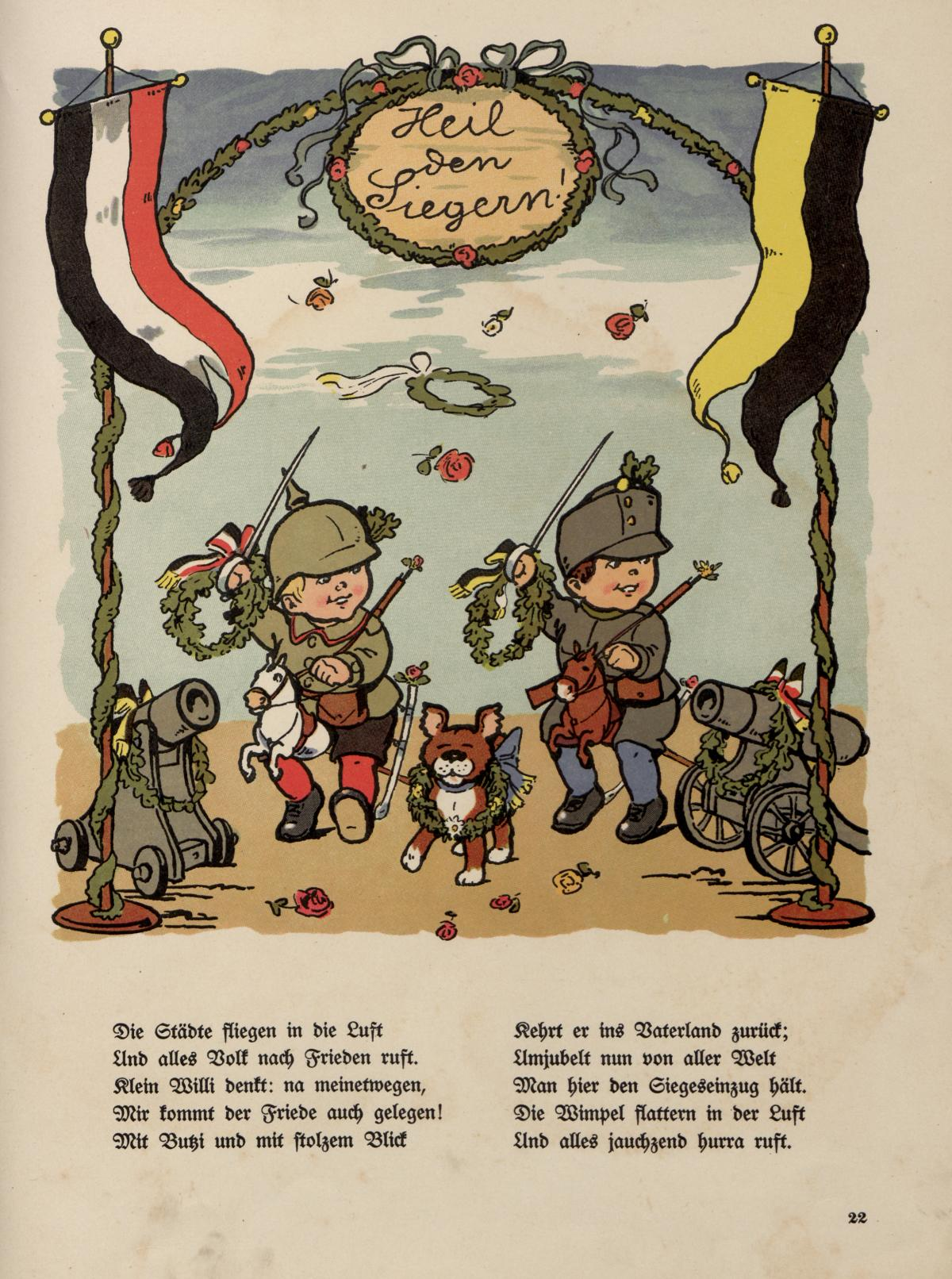
World War I propaganda cartoon from 1915, depicting the Flag of the German Empire and the Habsburg banner

Since the days of Rudolph of Habsburg and the 1283 Treaty of Rheinfelden, the combination of red-white-red was widely considered to be the Austrian (later also Inner Austrian) colours used by the ruling Habsburg dynasty. Black and gold later became the colours used by the Imperial House of Habsburg when they held the title of Holy Roman Emperor, as they did from the mid-15th century all the way to the dissolution of the Holy Roman Empire in 1806, and were themselves derived from the banner of the empire. The original form of this flag featured a gold background with a black double-headed eagle. However, this proved to be a complicated design, and was hard to reproduce. In the 18th century, a simpler form with black and gold bars started to appear in the lands ruled by the Holy Roman Emperor. With the end of the Holy Roman Empire in 1806, this flag was approved for use as a civil flag. The black–gold flag was used in a way similar to a modern national flag by the Austrian Habsburg monarchy within the Holy Roman Empire, by the later Austrian Empire, and by the Austrian part of Austria-Hungary, and was sometimes informally used for the entire empire, up until 1918.

During the reign of Emperor Joseph II, the Austrian, later Austro-Hungarian Navy started using a naval ensign (Marineflagge) based on the red–white–red colours, and augmented with a shield of similar colours. Both this and the black–gold flag became obsolete with Austria-Hungary's dissolution in 1918, and the newly-formed rump state of German Austria adopted the red–white–red triband as its national flag.

During the Bosnian Crisis, prince Nicholas I of Montenegro issued a statement on 6 October 1908 condemning the Habsburg annexation of Bosnia and Herzegovina (lands which he, along with the Kingdom of Serbia and his own Principality of Montenegro, identified as "Serbian"), rhetorically portraying the black–yellow flag as "a visible sign of injustice": "Montenegrins! Your two sad sisters, Bosnia and Herzegovina, which thirty years ago were momentarily illuminated by the rays of freedom, today were completely torn from the Serbian embrace. The Austro-Hungarian monarchy replaces the possession of those two provinces with the final annexation. (...) The marks of black and yellow colour down the Serbian land will not be a border, which will separate you in spirit and thought from your brothers. On the contrary, these features will be a visible sign of injustice; it will make the bonds even stronger and the pledge of permanent trust in the victory of Justice."

The Habsburg flag is closely similar to the flags of Namur, Belgium, of Aachen and Munich, Germany, and of the German state of Baden-Württemberg.

== See also ==
- List of Austrian flags
- Flag of Austria
- Black-yellow-white flag of the Russian Empire, which is similar but also has a white stripe.
