= Cisleithania =

Austrian part of Austria-Hungary, 1867–1918

Coordinates: 48°30′N 16°23′E

The Kingdoms and Lands Represented in the Imperial Council Die im Reichsrat vertretenen Königreiche und Länder (German)
- 1867–1918
- Flag Coat of Arms (1915–1918)
- Motto: Indivisibiliter ac inseparabiliter (Latin for 'Indivisibly and inseparably')
- Anthem: None Imperial anthem Gott erhalte, Gott beschütze (English: God preserve, God protect)
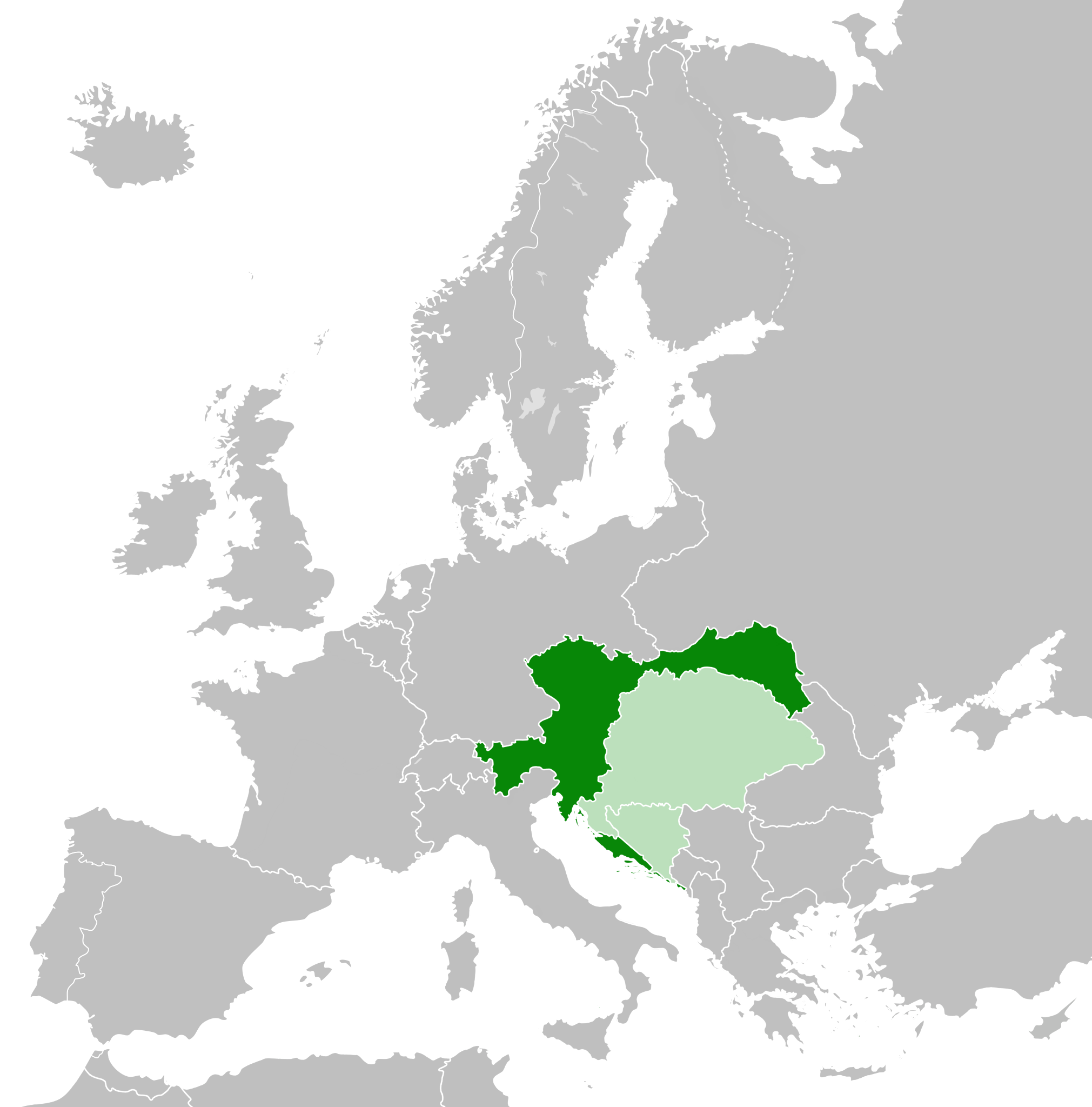
- Cisleithania within Austria-Hungary alongside Transleithania and Bosnia and Herzegovina

- Cisleithania (pink) within Austria-Hungary, the other parts being Transleithania (green) and the Condominium of Bosnia and Herzegovina (blue)
- Status: Self-governing part of Austria-Hungary
- Capital and largest city: Vienna
- Common languages: German; Slovene; Czech; Polish; Croatian; Serbian; Yiddish; Ukrainian; Istro-Romanian; Romanian; Italian
- Government: Constitutional monarchy
- Emperor (of Austria)
  - 1867–1916: Franz Joseph I
  - 1916–1918: Karl I
- Minister-President
  - 1867–1868: Prince Karl of Auersperg (first)
  - 1918: Heinrich Lammasch (last)
- Legislature: Imperial Council
  - Upper house: House of Lords
  - Lower house: House of Deputies
- Historical era: New Imperialism
  - 1867 Compromise: 30 March 1867
  - Dissolution of Austria-Hungary: 31 October 1918
  - Schönbrunn Declaration: 11 November 1918
  - Monarchy abolished: 12 November 1918

Area
  - Total: 300,005 km^{2} (115,833 sq mi)
- Currency: Florin (1867–1892); Crown (1892–1918)
Preceded by
| Austrian Empire |
Succeeded by
| Republic of German-Austria |
| First Czechoslovak Republic |
| Kingdom of Serbs, Croats and Slovenes |
| Second Polish Republic |
| Kingdom of Romania |
| West Ukrainian People's Republic |
| Kingdom of Italy |

Cisleithania, (Note: German: Cisleithanien, also Zisleithanien Slovene: Cislajtanija Hungarian: Ciszlajtánia Czech: Předlitavsko Slovak: Predlitavsko Polish: Przedlitawia Serbo-Croatian: Цислајтанија, Cislajtanija Romanian: Cisleithania Ukrainian: Цислейтанія, romanized: Tsysleitaniia Italian: Cisleitania) officially The Kingdoms and Lands Represented in the Imperial Council (German: Die im Reichsrat vertretenen Königreiche und Länder), was the northern and western part of Austria-Hungary, the Dual Monarchy created in the Compromise of 1867—as distinguished from Transleithania (i.e., the Hungarian Lands of the Crown of Saint Stephen east of ["beyond"] the Leitha River). This name for the region was a common, but unofficial one.

The Cisleithanian capital was Vienna, the residence of the Emperor of Austria. The territory had a population of 28,571,900 in 1910. It reached from Vorarlberg in the west to the Kingdom of Galicia and Lodomeria and the Duchy of Bukovina (today part of Ukraine and Romania) in the east, as well as from the Kingdom of Bohemia in the north to the Kingdom of Dalmatia (today part of Croatia and Montenegro) in the south. It comprised the current States of Austria (except for Burgenland), as well as most of the territories of the Czech Republic and Slovenia (except for Prekmurje), southern Poland, parts of Italy (Trieste, Gorizia, Tarvisio, Trentino, and South Tyrol), Croatia (Istria, Dalmatia), Montenegro (Kotor Bay), Romania (Southern Bukovina), and Ukraine (Northern Bukovina and Galicia).

== Term ==
Lesser coat of arms of the Austrian lands from 1915, featuring the double-headed Imperial Eagle with red-white-red escutcheon, Imperial Crown and Imperial Regalia

The Latin name Cisleithania derives from that of the Leitha River, a tributary of the Danube forming the historical boundary between the Archduchy of Austria and the Hungarian Kingdom in the area southeast of Vienna (on the way to Budapest). Much of its territory lay west (or, from a Viennese perspective, on "this" side) of the Leitha.

After the constitutional changes of the Austro-Hungarian Compromise of 1867, the Cisleithanian crown lands (Kronländer) continued to constitute the Austrian Empire, but the latter term was rarely used to avoid confusion with the era before 1867, when the Kingdom of Hungary had been a constituent part of that empire. The somewhat cumbersome official name was Die im Reichsrat vertretenen Königreiche und Länder ("The Kingdoms and Lands represented in the Imperial Council"). The phrase was used by politicians and bureaucrats, but it had no official status until 1915; the press and the general public seldom used it and then with a derogatory connotation. In general, the lands were just called Austria, but the term "Austrian lands" (Österreichische Länder) originally did not apply to the Lands of the Bohemian Crown (i.e., Bohemia proper, the Margraviate of Moravia and Duchy of Silesia) or to the territories annexed in the 18th-century Partitions of Poland (Kingdom of Galicia and Lodomeria) or the former Venetian Dalmatia (Kingdom of Dalmatia).

From 1867, the Kingdom of Hungary, the Kingdom of Croatia, the Kingdom of Slavonia and the Principality of Transylvania were no longer "Austrian" crown lands. Rather, they constituted an autonomous state, officially called the "Lands of the Holy Hungarian Crown of St Stephen" (Hungarian: Szent István Koronájának Országai or A Magyar Szent Korona Országai, German: Länder der Heiligen Ungarischen Stephanskrone) and commonly known as Transleithania or just Hungary. The Condominium of Bosnia and Herzegovina, occupied in 1878, formed a separate part. Both the "Austrian" and "Hungarian" lands of the Dual Monarchy had large Slavic-settled territories in the north (Czechs, Slovaks, Poles and Ruthenians) as well as in the south (Slovenes, Croats and Serbs).

== Crown lands ==
Cisleithania consisted of 15 crown lands which had representatives in the Imperial Council (Reichsrat), the Cisleithanian parliament in Vienna. The crown lands centered on the Archduchy of Austria (Erzherzogtum Österreich) were not states, but provinces in the modern sense. However, they were areas with unique historic political and legal characteristics and were therefore more than mere administrative districts. They have been conceived of as "historical-political entities".

Each crown land had a regional assembly, the Landtag, which enacted laws (Landesgesetze) on matters of regional and mostly minor importance. Until 1848, the Landtage had been traditional diets (assemblies of the estates of the realm). They were disbanded after the Revolutions of 1848 and reformed after 1860. Some members held their position as ex officio members (e.g., bishops), while others were elected. There was no universal and equal suffrage, but a mixture of privilege and limited franchise. The executive committee of a Landtag was called Landesausschuss and headed by a Landeshauptmann, being president of the Landtag as well.

From 1868 onwards Emperor Franz Joseph himself (in his function as monarch of a crown land, being king, archduke, grandduke, duke or count) and his Imperial–Royal (k.k.) government headed by the Minister-President of Austria were represented at the capital cities of the crown lands—except for Vorarlberg, which was administered with Tyrol, and Istria and Gorizia-Gradisca, which were administered together with Trieste under the common name of Austro-Illyrian Littoral—by a stadtholder (Statthalter), in few crown lands called Landespräsident, who acted as chief executive.

Crown lands of Austria–Hungary: Cisleithania (Empire of Austria): 1. Bohemia, 2. Bukovina, 3. Carinthia, 4. Carniola, 5. Dalmatia, 6. Galicia, 7. Austrian Littoral, 8. Lower Austria, 9. Moravia, 10. Salzburg, 11. Silesia, 12. Styria, 13. Tyrol, 14. Upper Austria, 15. Vorarlberg; Transleithania (Kingdom of Hungary): 16. Hungary proper, 17. Croatia-Slavonia; Austrian-Hungarian Condominium: 18. Bosnia and Herzegovina

=== Kingdoms ===
- Kingdom of Bohemia (Land of the Bohemian Crown)
- Kingdom of Dalmatia
- Kingdom of Galicia and Lodomeria

=== Archduchies ===
- Archduchy of Austria above the Enns (unofficially Upper Austria)
- Archduchy of Austria below the Enns (unofficially Lower Austria)

=== Grand duchies ===
- Grand Duchy of Kraków (subdivision of Galicia and Lodomeria)

=== Duchies ===
- Duchy of Bukovina
- Duchy of Carinthia
- Duchy of Carniola
- Duchy of Salzburg
- Duchy of Silesia (Land of the Bohemian Crown)
- Duchy of Styria

=== Margraviates ===
- Margraviate of Istria (part of the Austrian Littoral)
- Margraviate of Moravia (Land of the Bohemian Crown)

=== Princely counties ===
- Princely County of Gorizia and Gradisca (part of the Austrian Littoral)
- Princely County of Tyrol
- Princely County of Vorarlberg

=== Free cities ===
- Free City of Trieste (part of the Austrian Littoral)

=== Condominium ===
- Condominium of Bosnia and Herzegovina (governed jointly by Cisleithania and Transleithania) from 1878

== Politics ==
According to the "December Constitution", a redraft of the emperor's 1861 February Patent, the Austrian government was generally responsible in all affairs concerning the Cisleithanian lands, except for the common Austro-Hungarian Army, the Austro-Hungarian Navy and the Foreign Ministry, these k.u.k. matters remained reserved for the Imperial and Royal Ministers' Council for Common Affairs of Austria-Hungary.

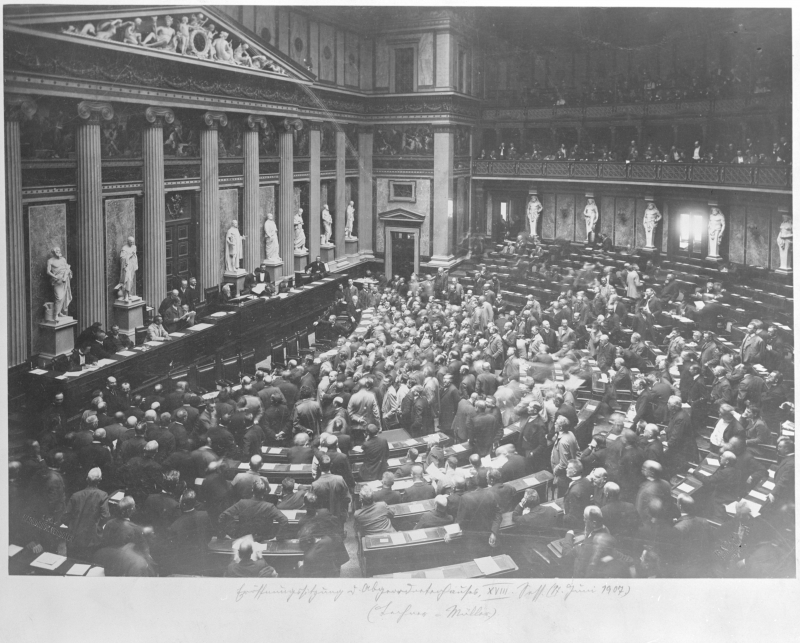
Initial meeting of the Abgeordnetenhaus in 1907

The Austrian Reichsrat, a bicameral legislature implemented in 1861, became the Cisleithanian parliament. Originally consisting of delegates of the Landtage, in 1873 direct election of the House of Deputies (Abgeordnetenhaus) was introduced with a four-class franchise suffrage for male landowners and bourgeois. Equal, direct, secret and universal suffrage—for men—was not introduced until a 1907 electoral reform. In this Lower House (with 353 members in 1873 and 516 in 1907), at first German-speaking deputies dominated, but with the extension of the suffrage the Slavs gained a majority. An ethnic nationalist struggle between German-speaking and Slavic deputies, especially in the context of the Czech National Revival, was played out. Leaders of the movement like František Palacký advocated the emancipation of the Slavic population within the Monarchy (Austroslavism), while politicians of the Young Czech Party principally denied the right of the Reichsrat to put any decisions relevant for the "Czech lands", and used means of filibustering as well as absence to torpedo its work. They were antagonized by radical German nationalists led by Georg von Schönerer, demanding the dissolution of the Monarchy and the unification of the "German Austrian" lands with the German Empire.

After 1893, no k.k. government was able to rely on a parliamentary majority. Nevertheless, Polish members of parliament and politicians like Count Kasimir Felix Badeni achieved some success involving Galician Poles by special regulations for this "developing country"; thence the Polenklub played a constructive role most of the time. Politics were frequently paralysed because of the tensions between different nationalities. When Czech obstruction at the Reichsrat prevented the parliament from working, the emperor went on to rule autocratically through imperial decrees (Kaiserliche Verordnungen) submitted by his government. The Reichsrat was prorogued in March 1914 at the behest of Minister-President Count Karl von Stürgkh, it did not meet during the July Crisis and was not reconvened until May 1917, after the accession of Emperor Karl in 1916.

For representation in matters relevant to the whole real union of Austria-Hungary (foreign affairs, defence, and the financing thereof) the Reichsrat appointed delegations of 60 members to discuss these matters parallel to Hungarian delegations of the same size and to come, in separate votes, to the same conclusion on the recommendation of the responsible common ministry. In Cisleithania, the 60 delegates consisted of 40 elected members of the House of Representatives (Abgeordnetenhaus) and 20 members of the Upper House (Herrenhaus). The delegations convened simultaneously, both either in Vienna or in Budapest, though spatially divided. In case of not getting the same decision in three attempts, the law permitted the summoning of a common session of both delegations and the eventual counting of the votes in total, but the Hungarians, who averted any Imperial "roof" over their part of the dual monarchy, as well as the common ministers, carefully avoided reaching this situation. Austria-Hungary as a common entity did not have its own jurisdiction and legislative power, which was shaped by the fact that there was no common parliament. The common diplomatic and military affairs were managed by delegations from the Imperial Council and the Hungarian parliament. According to the compromise, the members of the delegates from the two parliaments had no right to debate, they had no right to introduce new perspectives and own ideas during the meetings, they were nothing more than the extended arms of their own parliaments. All decisions had to be ratified by the Imperial council in Vienna and by the Hungarian parliament in Budapest. Without the Austrian and Hungarian parliamentary ratifications, the decisions of the delegates were not valid in Austria or in Kingdom of Hungary.

=== Language question ===
The December Constitution of 1867 established the equality of all languages in Cisleithania, but German kept a privileged position in the administration, the courts, the army and education. German never received legal status as the state language of Cisleithania, while Hungarian held that status in Transleithania. In the House of Deputies German remained the main language of debate until the end of the monarchy, although no rule prescribed it. Speeches in the other languages of the crown lands were allowed from 1867, but they were only recorded in full in the stenographic minutes from 1917.

The language question led to a severe state crisis in 1897. On 5 April that year Minister-President Kasimir Felix Badeni issued language ordinances for Bohemia, and similar ordinances for Moravia followed 17 days later. They made Czech equal to German even in the internal business of government offices, so that civil servants in both lands would have had to speak and write both languages. German nationalist parties protested, and in June German deputies began a filibuster that led to the adjournment of the Reichsrat. The obstruction continued after the parliament reconvened in September. In November the government parties changed the standing orders through the Lex Falkenhayn, which allowed the Speaker to expel deputies from the chamber, and the Social Democrats then joined the obstruction. There were street demonstrations in Vienna, Graz and German towns in Bohemia, and on 28 November 1897 Franz Joseph dismissed Badeni. After his fall, crowds in German-majority towns attacked Czech minorities, while rioters in Prague and other Czech-majority towns attacked German and Jewish property. The Prague riots ended after four days with the declaration of martial law. Badeni's successor Paul Gautsch tried to conciliate the Germans and met Czech obstruction. The ordinances were finally withdrawn in 1899 under Minister-President Manfred von Clary-Aldringen.

== Population ==
In 1910, Cisleithania had a population of about 28.6 million. The largest group within Cisleithania were Austrian Germans (including Yiddish-speaking Jews), who made up around a third of the population. German-speakers and Czechs made up a majority of the population. Almost 60% of Cisleithania's population was ethnically Slavic.

Ethnic composition of the Cisleithanian population (1910)
| Ethnicity | % of total population |
|---|---|
| Germans | 33% |
| Czechs | 22% |
| Poles | 15% |
| Ruthenians (Ukrainians) | 12% |
| Slovenes | 5% |
| Italians | 3% |
| Croats | 3% |
| Other | 7% |
Source: Allgemeines Verzeichnis der Ortsgemeinden und Ortschaften Österreichs nach den Ergebnissen der Volkszählung vom 31. Dezember 1910 (ed. by K.K. Statistische Zentralkommission, Vienna, 1915) (the latest Austrian gazetteer, register of political communities, giving the results of the 1910 census)

== Religion ==
Religion groups in Cisleithania included Roman Catholics, Greek Catholics, Eastern Orthodox, Evangelicals, Muslims and Jews. Roman Catholics were the largest religious group in the country that accounted for 79% of the population. While on the other hand, Greek Catholics accounted for 12% of the population. In the Austrian half, Orthodox church had 770,000 believers mostly concentrated in Dalmatia and Bukovina which represented 2.3% of the population. The Evengelical churches had 600,000 believers that represented 2% of the population in Cisleithania. Muslims, predominantly Sunni, became the citizens of the Austro-Hungarian Empire after the occupation in 1878 and later annexation in 1908. At the time they were called the Mohammedans and they were accounted for 1.2% of the population. Jews, according to the resource, represented 4.6% of the whole Austro-Hungarian population.

== Economy ==
Historical estimates for the economy of Cisleithania include the output of territories comprising modern Austria and historical Bohemia, Moravia, Galicia, Bukovina, Dalmatia and the Austrian Littoral. (Note: South Tyrol and Burgenland are excluded from these estimates.) Over the period 1870 to 1913, GDP per capita in Austria-Hungary grew by 1.12 percent per annum compared to 1.52 percent in Germany. GDP per capita grew by 1.01 percent per annum in Cisleithania compared to 1.31 percent in Transleithania or Hungary. Economic growth was significantly faster in the years after the Austro-Hungarian Compromise than in the preceding half-century.

GDP PPP (in millions of 1990 Int$ dollars)
| | Modern Austria | Other Cisleithenia | Total Cisleithenia |
|---|---|---|---|
| 1830 | 4,937 | 11,150 | 16,087 |
| 1870 | 8,429 | 16,574 | 25,003 |
| 1913 | 23,451 | 39,187 | 62,638 |

GDP PPP per capita (1990 Int$ dollars)
| | Modern Austria | Other Cisleithenia | Total Cisleithenia |
|---|---|---|---|
| 1830 | 1,395 | 907 | 1,016 |
| 1870 | 1,865 | 1,034 | 1,235 |
| 1913 | 3,465 | 1,736 | 2,135 |

== See also ==
- Imperial Crown of Austria
- Republic of German-Austria

== Sources ==
- Thaler, Peter (2001). The Ambivalence of Identity: The Austrian Experience of Nation-Building in a Modern Society. Purdue University Press. ISBN 978-1-55753-201-5.
- Catherine Horel (2023). Multicultural Cities of the Habsburg Empire, 1880–1914: imagined communities and conflictual encounters. Budapest-Vienna-New York: Central European University Press, ISBN 978-9633862896.
