= List of companies of Austria =

Austrian company list

Location of Austria

Austria is a federal republic and a landlocked country of over 9 million people in Central Europe. It is bordered by the Czech Republic and Germany to the north, Hungary and Slovakia to the east, Slovenia and Italy to the south, and Switzerland and Liechtenstein to the west. The territory of Austria covers 83,879 km^{2} (32,386 sq mi).

Austria is the 12th richest country in the world in terms of GDP (Gross domestic product) per capita, has a well-developed social market economy, and a high standard of living. Until the 1980s, many of Austria's largest industry firms were nationalised; in recent years, however, privatisation has reduced state holdings to a level comparable to other European economies. Labour movements are particularly strong in Austria and have large influence on labour politics. Next to a highly developed industry, international tourism is the most important part of the national economy.

For further information on the types of business entities in this country and their abbreviations, see "Business entities in Austria".

== Notable firms ==
This list includes notable companies with primary headquarters located in the country. The industry and sector follow the Industry Classification Benchmark taxonomy. Organizations which have ceased operations are included and noted as defunct.

Notable companies Status: P=Private, S=State; A=Active, D=Defunct
Name	Industry	Sector	Headquarters	Founded	Notes	Status	
A. Darbo	Consumer goods	Food products	Stans	1879	Jam, honey	P	A
Agrana	Consumer goods	Food products	Vienna	1988	Sugar, starch, fruit juice concentrates and fruit preparation	P	A
AHT Cooling Systems	Industrials	Electronic equipment	Rottenmann	1983	Cooling and refrigeration	P	A
AKG	Consumer goods	Consumer electronics	Vienna	1947	Professional audio, headphones	P	A
Ammerer Bed Company	Consumer goods	Durable household products	Ried im Innkreis	1763	Textile, mattresses and beds	P	A
ams AG	Technology	Semiconductors	Premstätten	1981	Semiconductors	P	A
Andritz	Industrials	Industrial machinery	Graz	1852	Plant engineering	P	A
AT&S	Technology	Electronic components	Leoben	1987	Printed circuit boards and IC substrates	P	A
Atomic Skis	Consumer goods	Recreational products	Altenmarkt im Pongau	1955	Skiing equipment	P	A
ATP	Industrials	Business support services	Innsbruck	1951	Architecture	P	A
Augarten porcelain	Consumer goods	Durable household products	Vienna	1923	Porcelain products	P	A
AMAG Austria Metall AG	Industrials	Diversified industrials	Braunau am Inn	1938	General manufacturing	P	A
Austria Wirtschaftsservice Gesellschaft (aws)	Financials	Banks	Vienna	1954	Development and financing bank	P	A
Austrian Airlines	Consumer services	Airlines	Schwechat	1957	Flag carrier airline	P	A
Austrian Post	Logistics	Delivery services	Vienna	1999	Postal services	P	A
B&R	Industrials	Electronic equipment	Eggelsberg	1979	Automation and process control	P	A
Bank Austria	Financials	Banks	Vienna	1855	Banking	P	A
bauMax	Consumer services	Home improvement retailers	Klosterneuburg	1976	Defunct 2015	P	D
BAWAG	Financials	Banks	Vienna	1922	Banking	P	A
Bene AG	Consumer goods	Furnishings	Waidhofen an der Ybbs	1790	Office furniture	P	A
Benteler International	Consumer goods	Auto parts	Salzburg	1876	Automotive supplier, steel tube production	P	A
Billa	Consumer services	Food retailers & wholesalers	Wiener Neudorf	1953	Supermarkets	P	A
Böhler-Uddeholm	Basic materials	Iron & steel	Vienna	1991	Steel	P	A
Borealis	Basic materials	Commodity chemicals	Vienna	1994	Polyethylene	P	A
Bundesimmobiliengesellschaft (BIG)	Financials	Real estate holding & development	Vienna	1992	Government real estate	P	A
CISC Semiconductor	Technology	Electronic components	Klagenfurt	1999	Engineering services	P	A
Coop Himmelb(l)au	Industrials	Business support services	Vienna	1968	Architecture	P	A
Delfortgroup	Basic materials	Paper	Traun	2006	Paper	P	A
Dependeq	Industrials	Business support services	Vienna	1999	Metallurgical plants	P	A
Diamond Aircraft Industries	Industrials	Aerospace	Wiener Neustadt	1981	Aircraft manufacturer	P	A
Doka Group	Industrials	Heavy construction	Amstetten	1868	Formwork	P	A
Doppelmayr Garaventa Group	Consumer goods	Recreational products	Wolfurt	1893	Commercial ski equipment	P	A
Dorotheum	Consumer services	Specialized consumer services	Vienna	1707	Auction house	P	A
Egger	Basic materials	Forestry	St. Johann in Tirol	1961	Wood-based panel products	P	A
Engel Austria	Industrials	Industrial machinery	Schwertberg	1945	Injection moulding machines	P	A
Erste Bank	Financials	Banks	Vienna	2008	Banking	P	A
EVN Group	Utilities	Energy production	Maria Enzersdorf	1922	Electric power	P	A
Fabasoft	Technology	Software	Linz	1988	Software	P	A
Fischer	Consumer goods	Recreational products	Ried im Innkreis	1924	Winter sports equipment	P	A
Frequentis	Technology	Telecommunications equipment	Vienna	1947	Communications technology	P	A
Fronius International	Technology	Electronic equipment	Pettenbach	1945	Welding technology, photovoltaics and battery charging technology	P	A
G.L. Pharma	Health care	Pharmaceuticals	Lannach	1947	Pharmaceuticals	P	A
GE Jenbacher	Industrials	Industrial machinery	Jenbach	1959	Engines	P	A
Gebrüder Weiss	Industrials	Delivery services	Lauterach	1823	Logistics	P	A
Gericom	Technology	Computer hardware	Linz	1990	Computer equipment, defunct 2008	P	D
Glock Ges.m.b.H.	Industrials	Defense	Deutsch-Wagram	1963	Small arms	P	A
Hainzl Industriesysteme	Industrials	Industrial machinery	Linz	1965	Industrial automation, mechanical engineering	P	A
Internorm	Industrials	Building materials & fixtures	Traun	1931	Windows and doors	P	A
Julius Blum	Consumer goods	Furnishings	Höchst	1952	Furniture industry	P	A
Kapsch	Technology	Telecommunications equipment	Vienna	1892	Telematics	P	A
KEBA	Industrials	Electronic equipment	Linz	1968	Automation solutions	P	A
Kika	Consumer goods	Furnishings	Vienna	1973	Furniture	P	A
Kores	Consumer goods	Nondurable household products	Vienna	1887	School supplies	P	A
KTM	Consumer goods	Automobiles	Mattighofen	1934	Motorcycles	P	A
Leder & Schuh	Consumer goods	Apparel retailers	Graz	1872	Footwear retail	P	A
Leipnik-Lundenburger	Consumer goods	Food products	Vienna	1867	Food industry	P	A
Lenzing AG	Basic materials	Commodity chemicals	Lenzing	1938	Cellulose fiber	P	A
Löblich & Co.	Industrials	Industrial machinery	Vienna	1738	Heating, commercial kitchens	P	A
Lyoness	Consumer services	Specialized consumer services	Graz	2003	Shopping community	P	A
Magenta Telekom	Telecommunications	Telecommunications services	Vienna	2002	Telecommunications, part of Deutsche Telekom (Germany)	P	A
Magna Steyr	Consumer goods	Automobiles	Graz	2001	Automobiles & components manufacturer	P	A
Manner	Consumer goods	Food products	Vienna	1890	Confectionery	P	A
Mayr-Melnhof	Industrials	Containers & packaging	Vienna	1950	Packaging	P	A
Meusburger	Industrials	Industrial machinery	Wolfurt	1964	Standard parts for mould bases and die sets	P	A
Noctua	Consumer goods	Computer hardware	Vienna	2005	Computer cooling systems	P	A
ÖAF	Consumer goods	Automobiles	Floridsdorf	1907	Automotive, now part of MAN SE	P	A
ÖBB	Industrials	Railroads	Vienna	1923	State railways	S	A
Oberbank	Financials	Banks	Linz	1869	Banking	P	A
OMV	Oil & gas	Exploration & production	Vienna	1956	Petroleum	P	A
Onepharm	Health care	Biotechnology	Vienna	2005	Biopharma	P	A
Österreichische Industrieholding AG	Financials	Asset managers	Vienna	1967	Government stockholder	S	A
Palfinger	Industrials	Commercial vehicles & trucks	Salzburg	1932	Cranes for trucks	P	A
pewag group	Industrials	Industrial machinery	Klagenfurt	1479	Chain manufacturer	P	A
Pfahnl	Consumer goods	Food products	Pregarten	1472	Flour milling industry	P	A
philoro	Basic materials	Precious metals	Vienna	2011	Bullions and coins	P	A
Plansee Group	Basic materials	Commodity chemicals	Breitenwang	1921	Powder metallurgy	P	A
Porr	Industrials	Heavy construction	Vienna	1869	Construction	P	A
Puch	Consumer goods	Recreational products	Graz	1889	Bikes	P	A
Raiffeisen	Financials	Banks	Vienna	1927	Banking	P	A
Rauch	Consumer goods	Soft drinks	Rankweil	1919	Beverages	P	A
Red Bull GmbH	Consumer goods	Beverages	Fuschl am See	1987	Beverages	P	A
RHI AG	Industrials	Industrial suppliers	Vienna	1834	Fireproof industry	P	A
Rosenbauer	Industrials	Commercial vehicles & trucks	Leonding	1866	Fire vehicles	P	A
Rotax	Industrials	Auto components	Gunskirchen	1920	Aircraft, marine & vehicle engines	P	A
S&T	Technology	Computer services	Linz	2008	IT consulting and services	P	A
Semperit	Basic materials	Commodity chemicals	Vienna	1824	Rubber products	P	A
SKIDATA	Industrials	Electronic equipment	Grödig	1977	Access systems	P	A
Steyr Mannlicher	Industrials	Defense	Sankt Ulrich bei Steyr	1864	Firearms	P	A
Steyr Motors GmbH	Industrials	Auto components	Sankt Ulrich bei Steyr	2001	Diesel engines	P	A
Steyr Tractor	Consumer goods	Automobiles	Floridsdorf	1907	Tractors	P	A
Strabag	Industrials	Heavy construction	Vienna	1835	Construction	P	A
Swarovski	Consumer goods	Clothing & accessories	Wattens	1895	Jewelry and optical instruments	P	A
Taurob	Industrials	Industrial machinery	Vienna	2010	Robots for hazardous environments	P	A
Telekom Austria	Telecommunications	Fixed line telecommunications	Vienna	1998	Telecom	P	A
TGW Logistics Group	Industrials	Logistics	Marchtrenk	1969	Automated warehouse solutions	P	A
Traktionssysteme Austria	Industrials	Industrial machinery	Wiener Neudorf	2000	Electric traction motors, traction drives, and generators for rail and road commercial vehicles	P	A
Trotec	Industrials	Industrial machinery	Marchtrenk	1997	Laser systems for laser engraving, laser marking, and laser cutting	P	A
Uniqa	Financials	Full line insurance	Vienna	1922	Insurance	P	A
Verbund	Utilities	Alternative electricity	Vienna	1947	Utilities, hydroelectric	S	A
Vienna Insurance Group	Financials	Full line insurance	Vienna	1824	Insurance	P	A
Voestalpine	Basic materials	Iron & steel	Linz	1938	Steelmaker	P	A
Wienerberger	Industrials	Building materials & fixtures	Vienna	1819	Bricks	P	A
Wintersteiger	Industrials	Industrial machinery	Ried im Innkreis	1953	Machinery and equipment	P	A
WolfVision	Consumer goods	Consumer electronics	Klaus	1966	Presentation, collaboration, and knowledge sharing systems and solutions	P	A
Zumtobel Lighting Group	Industrials	Building materials & fixtures	Dornbirn	1950	Lighting	P	A

== See also ==
- List of largest Austrian companies
