= Onepharm =

Austrian biopharmaceutical company

onepharm R & D GmbH
- Company type: Private (Gesellschaft mit beschränkter Haftung)
- Industry: Biopharmaceutical, Drug delivery
- Founded: September 2005
- Founder: Bernhard Küenburg
- Headquarters: Vienna, Austria
- Key people: Bernhard Küenburg (CEO), Otto Dobblhoff-Dier (COO), Angelika Bodenteich (CSO)
- Products: Pharmaceutical drug
- Owner: AVIR Green Hills Biotechnology, management, private investors
- Number of employees: 7 (2009)
- Subsidiaries: Savira Pharmaceuticals GmbH
- Website: www.onepharm.com

Onepharm is a small, venture-financed Austrian biopharmaceutical company onepharm researches and develops products for periodontology. Originally focused on the development of antiviral drugs, it spun these activities out to a subsidiary, Savira Pharmaceuticals, in 2009.

== Creation ==
The creation of onepharm was triggered by the desire of its parent company, AVIR Green Hills Biotechnology to divest itself of its drug development business and to focus entirely on vaccine development. The new company, which had been a finalist for the Best of Biotech award, was founded in July 2005 and became operational in September 2005, with initial funding from two Austria Wirtschaftsservice credit programs. Two of the founders took the top management positions: Bernhard Küenburg, a former senior vice president of marketing, sales and development at Siegfried (a Swiss custom manufacturer of active pharmaceutical ingredients) became the central executive officer; and Otto Dobblhoff-Dier, a professor of bioprocess engineering who had been vice president for global manufacturing at the Vienna cancer vaccine company Igeneon AG prior to its acquisition by Aphton Corp., became chief operating officer.

Early in 2006 onepharm secured an EUR 2.7 million grant in funding from the Vienna Business Agency’s Center for Innovation and Technology, as part of a collaboration with the University of Natural Resources and Applied Life Sciences Vienna and the Vienna University of Technology.

== R & D focus ==
By 2010 onepharm has maintained its strict focus on exploiting the pharmacological potential of glycyrrhizin (the sweet-tasting triterpene glycoside in liquorice) as a lead for drug development. Elivir, a project aiming at the development of an antiviral nasal spray to treat the common cold, was in preclinical development in 2006 and was supposed to be outlicensed in 2008 after successful conclusion of Phase II clinical trials. No progress has been reported, and Elivir is believed to have been discontinued.

The initial intent was to develop an antiviral drug for the treatment of influenza, and possibly other viral infections such as SARS, by building and testing libraries of glycyrrhizin derivatives at the Antiviral Spot Of Excellence" (ASPEX; a cooperation of onepharm and the Vienna universities for technology and applied life sciences). In November 2007, onepharm finalised an exclusive strategic cooperation agreement with the Japanese pharmaceutical company Minophagen, a major supplier of pharmaceutical-grade glycyrrhizin and marketer of a glycyrrhizin-based drug. By this time, the company had secured an additional EUR 2 million in financing, and had moved its operations to the science park at the University of Veterinary Medicine Vienna campus.

By mid-2008 onepharm had secured financing amounting to a total of EUR 8 million, and had started to build a new focus on periodontitis, based on the inhibition of inflammation-induced periodontal bone loss which the lead compound OPM-3023 had shown in a rat model. A collaboration with The Forsyth Institute, one of the world's leading centers for dental research, has been established.

The German health authorities have approved a Phase II clinical study with OPM-3023 in periodontitis, which is supposed to commence in 2010. A microsphere-based controlled release formulation of OPM-3023 is being developed.

== Spin-out of Savira Pharmaceuticals ==
In October 2009, onepharm decided to focus entirely on the development of OPM-3023 for periodontitis. Its antiviral drug development activities were spun out to a newly created subsidiary, Savira Pharmaceuticals GmbH which was founded in cooperation with the European Molecular Biology Laboratory, with EUR 1 million funding from the Austria Wirtschaftsservice. Savira's CEO is Oliver Szolar, formerly onepharm's chief science officer.

== Scientific papers by onepharm ==
- Schröfelbauer B, Raffetseder J, Hauner M, Wolkerstorfer A, Ernst W, Szolar OH (August 2009). "Glycyrrhizin, the main active compound in liquorice, attenuates pro-inflammatory responses by interfering with membrane-dependent receptor signalling". The Biochemical Journal. 421 (3): 473–82. doi:10.1042/BJ20082416. hdl:2262/45353. PMID 19442240.
- Classen-Houben D, Schuster D, Da Cunha T, et al. (February 2009). "Selective inhibition of 11beta-hydroxysteroid dehydrogenase 1 by 18alpha-glycyrrhetinic acid but not 18beta-glycyrrhetinic acid". The Journal of Steroid Biochemistry and Molecular Biology. 113 (3–5): 248–52. doi:10.1016/j.jsbmb.2009.01.009. PMID 19429429.
- Wolkerstorfer A, Kurz H, Bachhofner N, Szolar OH (August 2009). "Glycyrrhizin inhibits influenza A virus uptake into the cell". Antiviral Research. 83 (2): 171–8. doi:10.1016/j.antiviral.2009.04.012. PMC 7126985. PMID 19416738.
- del Ruiz Ruiz MC, Amer H, Stanetty C, et al. (June 2009). "Efficient synthesis of glycyrrhetinic acid glycoside/glucuronide derivatives using silver zeolite as promoter". Carbohydrate Research. 344 (9): 1063–71. doi:10.1016/j.carres.2009.04.015. PMID 19428000.
- Szolar OH (January 2007). "Environmental and pharmaceutical analysis of dithiocarbamates". Analytica Chimica Acta. 582 (2): 191–200. doi:10.1016/j.aca.2006.09.022. PMID 17386492.
- Szolar OH, Stranner S, Zinoecker I, et al. (June 2006). "Qualification and application of a surface plasmon resonance-based assay for monitoring potential HAHA responses induced after passive administration of a humanized anti Lewis-Y antibody". Journal of Pharmaceutical and Biomedical Analysis. 41 (4): 1347–53. doi:10.1016/j.jpba.2006.03.026. PMID 16644171.
