= Charles H. Lundquist College of Business =

Business school of the University of Oregon

Coordinates: 44.04605°N 123.07761°W

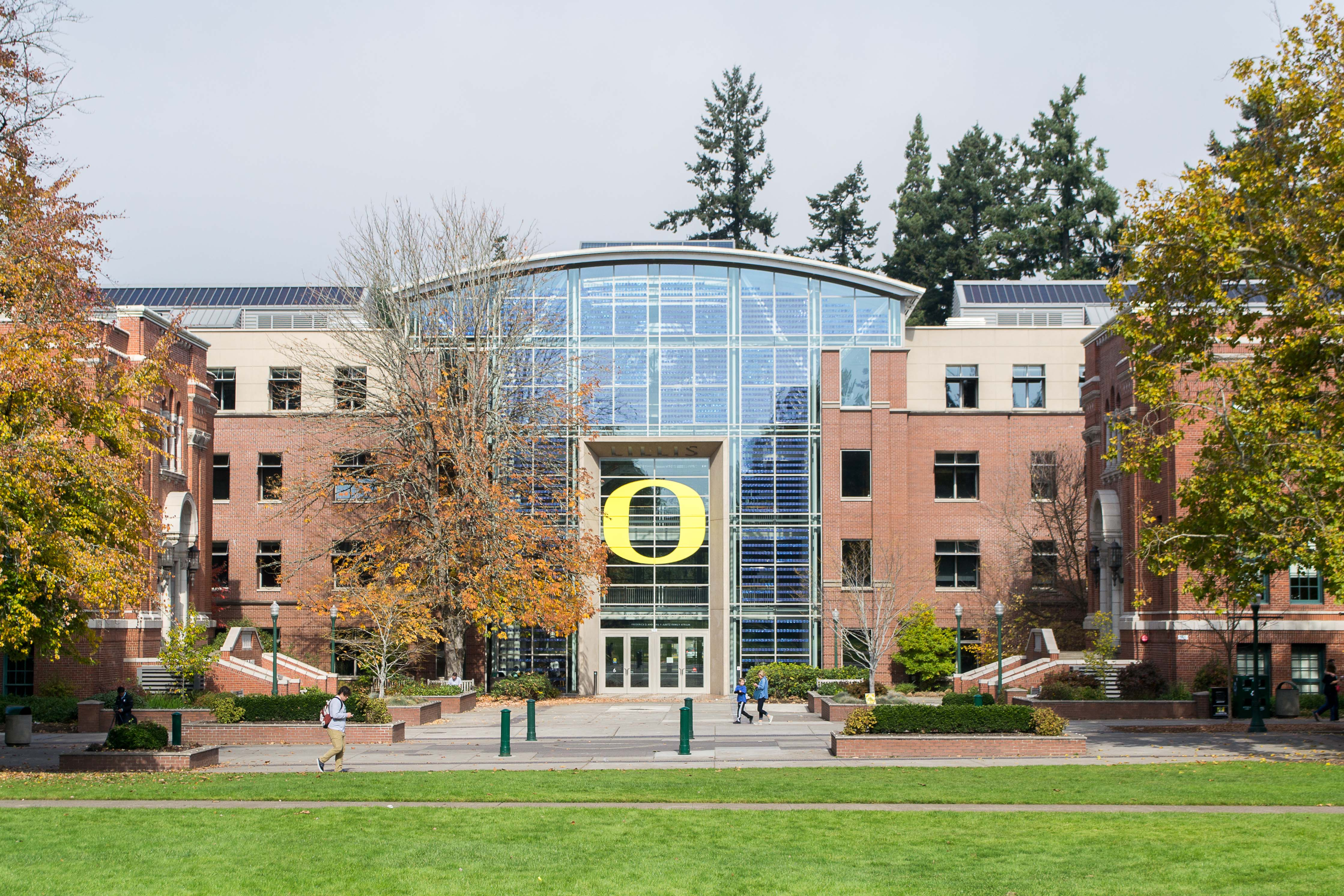
- Lillis Business Complex, the home of the Lundquist College
- Former names: • School of Commerce (1914-1920) • School of Business Administration (1920-1967) • College of Business Administration (1967-1994)
- Type: Public
- Established: 1914
- Endowment: $71.4 million (2015)
- Dean: Bruce Blonigen
- Faculty: 160 total (Fall 2021)
- Students: 4,890 (Fall 2021) majors, master's and doctoral students
- Undergraduates: 1,807 Business Administration Majors; 1,505 Pre-Business Majors; 170 Accounting Majors; 921 Business Minors
- Postgraduates: 145 Oregon MBA; 98 Oregon Executive MBA; 209 Other Master's; 35 PhD
- Location: Eugene, Oregon, USA
- Website: https://business.uoregon.edu

The Charles H. Lundquist College of Business (also known as the Lundquist College of Business) is the University of Oregon's business school. Founded in 1914, the Lundquist College offers undergraduate degree programs in business administration and accounting, as well as MBA, Executive MBA, Master of Science in Sports Product Management, Master of Accounting, Master of Science in Finance, Master of Science in Management, and PhD graduate programs. These degree programs are supported by four departments (finance, management, marketing, and operations and business analytics) and one school of accounting.

== About ==
The Lundquist College of Business draws strength from its links to the Pacific Rim and the distinctive qualities of Oregon culture: innovation, sustainability, active lifestyles, and financial stewardship.

The college is accredited through the Association to Advance Collegiate Schools of Business (AACSB). Roughly 5% of the world's business schools have this accreditation. Additionally, the accounting program is also accredited though AACSB.

The college is housed in the Lillis Business Complex. Completed in 2003, the facility's then state-of-the-art lighting system was once featured in a Wall Street Journal article. The college's current dean is Bruce Blonigen. Blonigen joined the Lundquist College as dean on July 15, 2022.

The college is home to four centers of excellence (Center for Sustainable Business Practices, James H. Warsaw Sports Business Center, Lundquist Center for Entrepreneurship, and Cameron Center for Finance and Securities Analysis) that advance an "experiential learning" approach to business education. The Warsaw Sports Business Center was the first program of its kind housed within a U.S. college of business. Founded in 1993, the Warsaw Sports Business Center provides a platform for both research and education focused on the $500 billion sports business industry. In September 2021, Sports Business placed the Oregon MBA's sports business track (coordinated by the Warsaw Center) among the top seven sports programs in the world.

From 1992 to 2022, the college's Lundquist Center for Entrepreneurship presented the New Venture Championship, an investment competition for graduate students that draws competitors from all over the world. In 2023, the Lundquist College of Business and the Lundquist Center for Entrepreneurship launched the Oregon Innovation Challenge to help students launch and fund ventures and projects. In 2025, 363 projects were submitted to the challenge, 90 teams pitched for funding, and the 30 top teams received a total of $150,000.

The Department of Accounting offers a one-year Masters of Accounting (MAcc) program allowing accounting students to earn enough credits for CPA eligibility in the State of Oregon. In addition, the Beta Alpha Psi Chapter is the second oldest in the nation.

=== Portland campus ===
The Lundquist College of Business operates its Oregon Executive MBA program in Portland, Oregon. The program for working professionals, located at the Oregon Business Institute in downtown Portland was formerly a partnership of Oregon State University, Portland State University, and the University of Oregon and is now solely a program of the Lundquist College of Business. In the 2016, the Oregon Executive MBA Program and Master of Science in Sports Management program relocated to a new building across the street from the White Stag Block, where the rest of UO's Portland programs are based. In 2024, the new UO Portland Campus opened and the Oregon Executive MBA and Sports Project Management programs moved to the NE Portland Campus.

== Programs ==
=== Undergraduate programs ===
The undergraduate program offers BA/BS degrees in business administration and accounting.

According to the 2026 U.S. News & World Report rankings of undergraduate business programs, the college is ranked 41st nationally.

==== Business Administration ====
The undergraduate business program has been accredited by the AACSB since 1923.

Before students can declare their major as either Business or Accounting they must declare their major as "Pre-Business". As Pre-Business students, students complete their "lower division core" and supporting coursework. Students must take four business courses, 75 credits, and maintain a 3.0 GPA before they can major in either Business or Accounting.

According to USNews, the undergraduate program is ranked 41st out of 514 programs nationwide in 2021. Among public universities it is ranked 26th.

The undergraduate program is primarily a two-year program. Over one thousand students are enrolled as pre-business majors in the college. However, not all Pre-Business majors become Business or Accounting majors.

==== Accounting ====
The undergraduate accounting program is based in the School of Accounting and it has been accredited by the AACSB since 1989.

==== Minor program ====
There are also 900+ students enrolled in minors programs at the college. Students may earn a minor in business administration, sports business, entrepreneurship, or sustainable business.

=== Graduate programs ===
Lundquist College of Business graduate programs have been accredited by the AACSB since 1962.

==== Oregon MBA ====
The Oregon MBA is available as a full-time, two-year program or one-year accelerated program. Students complete a set of core business courses and then complete additional course work in one of four specialization areas: Finance and Securities Analysis, Innovation and Entrepreneurship, Sports Business, Sustainable Business Practices.

The Oregon MBA was ranked 72nd in the United States by U.S. News & World Report in its "2023 Best Business Schools" ranking.

In 2015, the Princeton Review named the Oregon MBA program first in the United States in the Green MBA category. In 2025, the Oregon MBA program was ranked fifth best Green MBA, seventh best graduate program for entrepreneurship in the west, tenth best MBA for operations, and top 50 graduate programs for entrepreneurship in the U.S. by the same publication.

The Oregon MBA's Sustainable Business Practices specialization empowers professionals to influence how a company changes its trajectory over time. Graduates have gone on to work for the likes of Amazon, Unilever, Nike, Columbia Sportswear, Sony, the US Department of Energy, and leading global consulting firms.

The MBA program was once hailed as the 9th best "Green MBA" in the world by the magazine Corporate Knights.

==== Oregon Executive MBA ====
Founded in 1986, the Oregon Executive MBA is a twenty-month program tailored for individuals who already have several years of work and management experience. Classes meet on alternating Fridays and Saturdays with short breaks in December and March, and summers off. The Oregon Executive MBA follows a cohort model, promoting camaraderie and the development of a professional network, and with students progressing through the program together. The curriculum includes an international study trip during the first year to developing countries such as Brazil, China, Argentina, Peru, Hong Kong, and Vietnam. The second year culminates in the Capstone Business Project, where students work with the guidance of advisers to create a business plan or consulting project.

==== Master of Science in Sports Product Management ====
The Sports Product Management Master's degree is a full-time, in person Master's program focused on the business of sport and outdoor product creation based in Portland, Oregon. It takes 18 months to complete and consists of five terms, totaling 65 credit hours, which begin in the fall term.

==== Master of Accounting ====
The MAcc curriculum is designed to be completed in one academic year. It consists of twelve three- or four-credit courses and two one-credit seminars (45 credits minimum). Five core accounting classes, two accounting electives, five general business or other graduate electives, and two one-credit seminars in Developing the Business Professional are required.

==== Master of Science in Finance ====
Students complete the Master's in Science of Finance (MSF) program in 12 months(4 quarters) beginning in the summer term. The curriculum emphasizes valuation and asset management and consists of six core courses plus electives, totaling a minimum of 45 credits. The required courses have no pre-requisites for MSF students.

==== Master of Science in Management ====
The Master of Science in Management (MSM) program is a 10-month program designed for students with non-business undergraduate degrees. After completing the MSM program, students are eligible for the accelerated MBA program, allowing them to earn an MBA on a shortened timeline after they have gained some work experience. The curriculum focuses on core business fundamentals and emphasizes professional development.

==== PhD ====
The doctoral program at the Lundquist College of Business prepares scholars to research and teach at business colleges and universities throughout the world. PhD students concentrate in one of five areas: accounting, finance, management, marketing, or operations and business analytics.

== Organization and research ==
The college is organized into 4 departments, one school, and 4 cross-disciplinary centers.

=== School of Accounting ===
The School of Accounting was established in 2017. The accounting program was formerly a department.

=== Departments ===
- Finance
- Management
- Marketing
- Operations and Business Analytics

=== Centers ===
- Cameron Center for Finance and Securities Analysis
- Center for Sustainable Business Practices
- Lundquist Center for Entrepreneurship
- Warsaw Sports Business Center

According to rankings compiled by the University of Texas at Dallas, LCB ranks 59th in North America in contributions to research.

According to rankings compiled by Brigham Young University, LCB ranks 1st in tax research.

== Relationship with the sports industry ==
The college has a longstanding relationship with the sports industry, more specifically sports marketing. The college's Warsaw Sports Business Center is recognized as a leading authority in sports marketing. The center was founded in 1994 with an endowment established by Jim Warsaw. Its growth was inspired by Jim’s vision of developing values based on passion, integrity, and leadership. He fostered leaders who possessed deep analytical and strategic skills and a love of sports. Furthermore, the center is said to be the first sports marketing center to be housed within an American business school. The center is a multi-disciplinary research hub. It also provides experiential learning opportunities for UO students. In 2012, the center was quoted in 571 media outlets globally.

The Sports Product Management program, based in Portland, is one of the first of its kind.

== Notable alumni ==
Below is a list of notable Lundquist College of Business alumni with significant ties to the business world. See the linked article above for a more extensive list of alumni.

- Bill Bowerman, (circa 1970), co-founder of Nike Inc.; former Oregon Ducks track and field coach
- Paul Brainerd, founder of Aldus Corporation and creator of PageMaker
- Renée James, M.B.A. (1992), former president of Intel Corporation
- Phil Knight, B.S. (1959), co-founder and former CEO of Nike Inc.; currently 35th wealthiest billionaire in the world
- Mickey Loomis, B.S. (1979), general manager of the New Orleans Saints; executive vice president of the New Orleans Pelicans
- Robert Polet, M.B.A. (1976), former CEO of Gucci
- Jamie Price, President and CEO of Advisor Group
- Joseph Robertson, Executive M.B.A. (1997), former president of Oregon Health and Science University

== See also ==
- New Venture Championship
