= Ayoxxa Biosystems =

Biotechnology company

- Type: Private
- Industry: Biotech
- Founded: Singapore (2010), Germany (2012)
- Founder: Andreas Schmidt, Dieter Trau
- Headquarters: Cologne, Germany
- Key people: Albrecht Läufer (CEO), Markus Zumbansen (CTO)
- Products: Development of a Protein chip platform based on the Bead-based Arrays, named LUNARIS (TM) multiplexing technology
- Production output: Biomarker Detection Kits
- Services: Multiplexing and Readout Services, Assay Development Services
- Owner: Prosnav Capital, and others
- Subsidiaries: Ayoxxa Inc. (USA), Ayoxxa Living Health Technologies Pte. Ltd (Singapore)
- Website: www.ayoxxa.com

Ayoxxa Biosystems (stylized in its logo as AYOXXA) is a biotechnology company founded in 2010 in Singapore, and headquartered in Germany.

The company is known for developing protein chip capable of detecting at once multiple biomarkers, biomarker signatures (including markers for cancer, allergies, age related macular degeneration AMD, or infectious diseases) from a small biological sample. The protein chip yields large amounts of data, being primarily aimed for use in biomedical research in academia, clinic and industry.

== History ==
In 2006 the basic technology of the position-encoded bead-based Arrays multiplex protein chip began to be developed in the research labs of the Department of Bioengineering, at the National University of Singapore (NUS). The project was led by Dieter Trau, Assistant Professor at NUS' Department of Bioengineering and Department of Chemical and Biomolecular Engineering.

As a result, and with the continued support of NUS, the start-up Ayoxxa Living Health Technologies Pte. Ltd was founded in 2010. The rights to the intellectual property developed at NUS were exclusively licensed to Ayoxxa, for the company to further develop.

In 2012 the company expanded operations to Europe, establishing its headquarters in Cologne, Germany, as Ayoxxa Biosystems GmbH. From there the company develops partnerships, services, commercialization and conducts further research.

Between 2010 and 2021 there were multiple rounds of financing, with shareholders including Andreas Schmidt, Dieter Trau, Wellington Partners, NRW.Bank, High-Tech Gründerfonds, Rainer Christine, Gregor Siebenkotten, KfW, b-to-v Partners, Creathor Venture, and HR Ventures.

In 2016 Andreas Schmidt stepped down from the CEO position, later becoming the CEO of Proteona, a single cell analysis and artificial intelligence company. Schmidt remained a board member of Ayoxxa, with Rodney Turner becoming CEO.

In 2022 Ayoxxa closed a new financing round led by Hong Kong-based Prosnav Capital, with the stated goal of bringing funding to support operations and commercialization for 3-5 years. CEO Rodney Turner was succeeded by Albrecht Läufer.

== Ayoxxa protein chip I ==
Ayoxxa's protein chip or microarray technology enables the detection of large number of diseases through the protein analysis of a single droplet of blood or other bodily fluids. This technology contrasts with previously established methods which were restricted to a single point testing, requiring considerable amounts of biological sample, and limiting the amount of analytes tested from each sample.

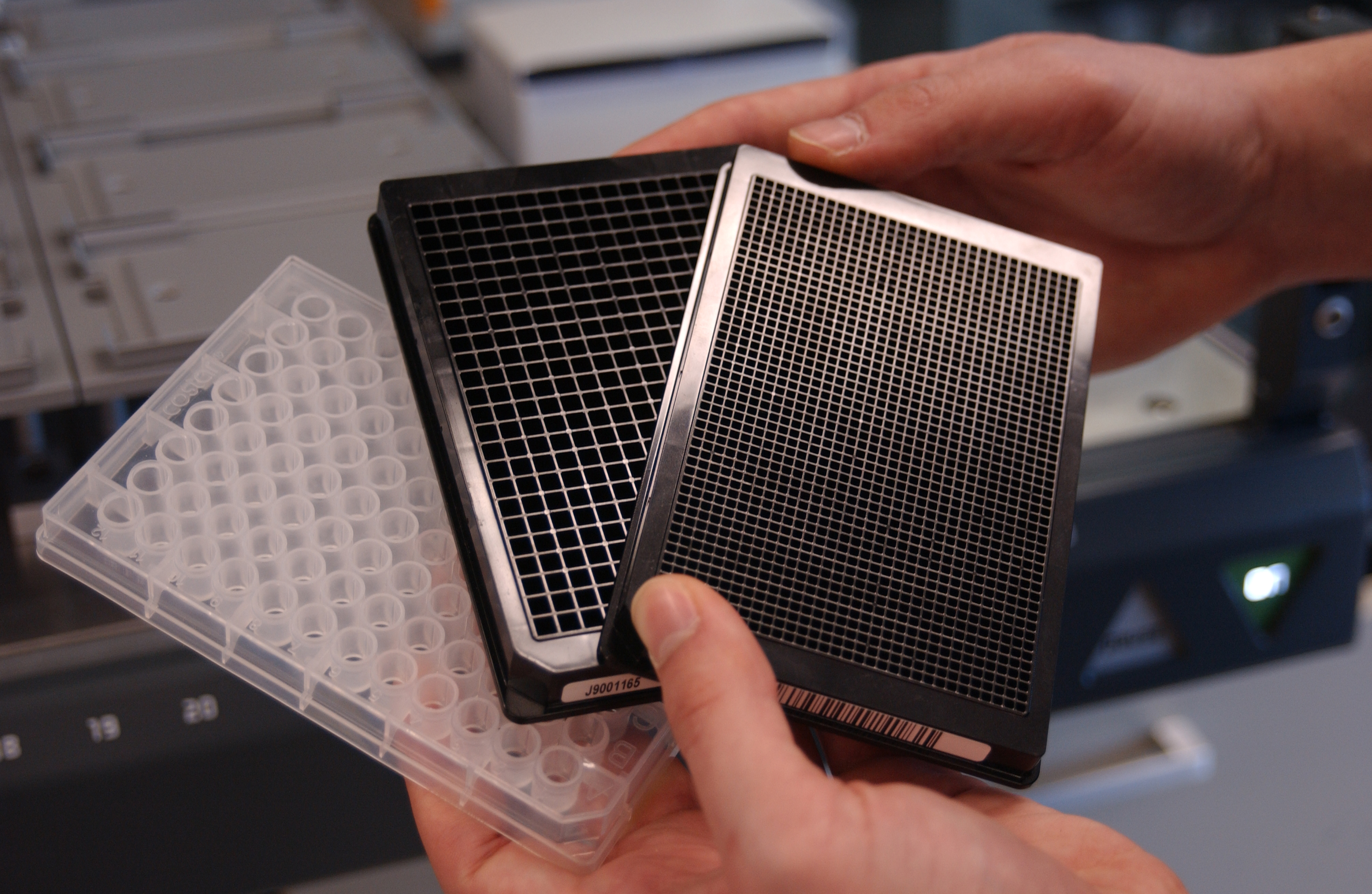
Example of 96, 384 and 1536 well plates normally used for ELISA

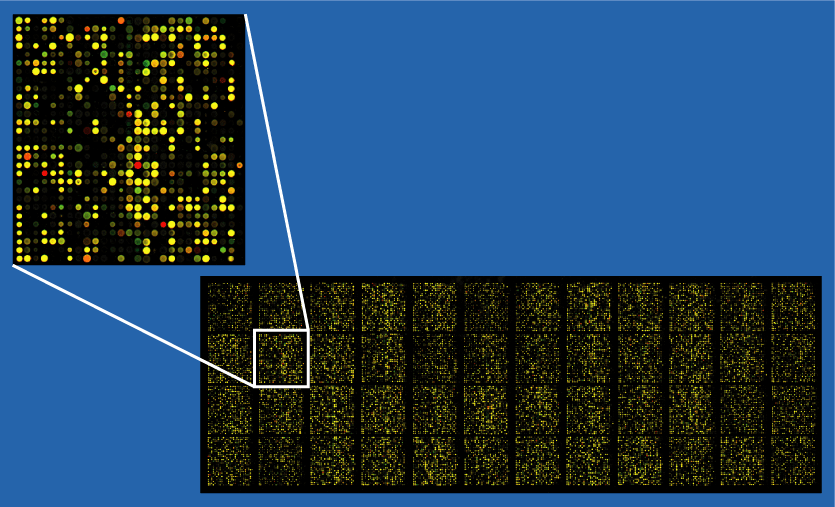
Example of 37,500-probe DNA microarray with enlarged inset to show detail.
Ayoxxa's protein biochip technology is developed to achieve a comparable multiplex protein analysis (simultaneous analysis of multiple components in a single sample)

Instead of yielding one data point at a time (as is the case with classic ELISA), this new technology provides up to 10,000 data points, with efficient labor input, using samples down to 3 microliters (μL) (range of 3 × 10^{−3} mL). The multiplex technology approaches a level of analytical power (in throughput and accuracy) only previously seen in DNA sequencing arrays.

The protein chip is made of silicon and is used to identify and qualify protein markers for cancer, allergies, cardiovascular or infectious diseases. It simultaneously identifies multiple analytes, and the interactions between them. The technology is developed to run manually as well as fully automated, and giving more results quickly at high-throughput (yielding large amounts of data). The development of this technology is especially directed at the support biomedical research in academic and industry research, with longer-term uses in pharmaceutical screening and preclinical diagnostics.

=== Protein microarray ===
Microarrays are built of an 8 cm × 2 cm silicon base plate, or biochip, with dozens of separate 'wells' or containers located on top, each one offering a capacity for up to 20 uL used to incubate with reagents, blocking or washing solutions. Each of these macro-wells, contain thousands of micro-wells at the bottom, each measuring about 1/20th the diameter of a single strand of human hair.

The wells on the chip are filled with antibodies (proteins) linked to microspheres to reside in the cavities. Antibodies by nature are produced by immune cells. They 'bind' specifically to the antigens on the surface of viruses, bacteria, and diseased cells to clear and to prevent health damages to the body. Since antibodies are highly specific proteins, binding to specific antigens, they have been exploited to identify and measure protein biomarkers in immunoassays (e.g. ELISA).

Since different antibodies 'bind' themselves to antigens, this affinity can be exploited for protein analytics by filling the wells with thousands of antibodies, and observing if and how much of a target antigen is present in a sample, or not. Ayoxxa's biochip can be used to identify thousands of different proteins in a single sample, including markers for diseases, where before numerous of the classic ELISA assays would be required to achieve the same results.

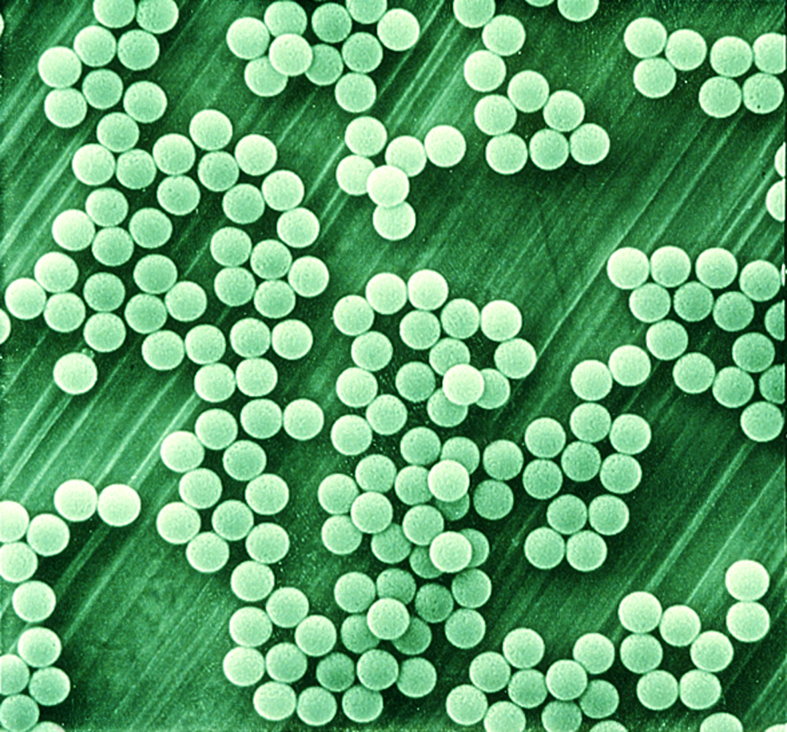
Microscopic photograph of microbeads. These are polymer nanoparticles, typically 0.5 to 500 micrometres in diameter. In protein laboratory work, researchers attach different antibodies to different beads, keeping a record of what specific type of antibody each bead contains, and then track those beads in order to observe which ones react when exposed to a sample.

To observe the reaction of the different antibodies to the sample, the chip is placed under a standard laboratory fluorescent microscope with a digital camera, which snaps shots of it. It is then possible to electronically analyze and generate data of the different molecules and proteins present in the samples.

=== In-situ Encoded Bead-based Arrays (IEBA) technology ===
The technology centers on the patented In-situ Encoded Bead-based Arrays (IEBA), originally developed at the National University of Singapore (NUS), of which Ayoxxa was made the exclusive licensee. Unlike other available bead-based microarrays, IEBA achieves greater multiplexing capability by recording the position of randomly distributed beads without the need for physical labels for bead identification, using instead the assignment of unique coordinates to each bead with an in-house software.

These batches of different beads, each batch being an assay or capture site for a specific biomolecule, are applied sequentially creating a unique pattern for every well. The coordinates of each individual bead in each sequential batch is recorded in a large map/decoding data table that is provided to the user alongside the carrier (like a USB flashdrive). The assay itself follows the sandwich ELISA principle with a read out based on a fluorescent reporter introduced at the final step of the assay. Following imaging using fluorescence microscope technology on the reacted chip, the company's analysis software identifies the individual beads according to their unique signals, later decrypted with the company's software to deliver a customized report to the user. This approach significantly reduces the complexity of downstream analysis while increasing the number of individual protein targets that can be analyzed in very low sample volumes.

=== Open platform and interoperability ===
Ayoxxa has stated that its focus is in developing an open and adaptable IEBA platform, that can be easily incorporated into laboratories by being compatible with the existing laboratory technology that researchers are accustomed to using. Furthermore, IEBA is being developed to run with automated liquid handling systems used in high-throughput screening. It has also stated its aim at making the IEBA an open platform, adaptable to the diverse research needs. Ayoxxa's CEO Andreas Schmidt compared the company's open platform philosophy as that of iTunes and iPhone, where many different apps (different biomarkers) run on the iPhone (Ayoxxa's platform).

The IBEAs can be used from low sample numbers up to the standard 384 well plate format, basically being a more advanced ELISA, keeping the current standards and protocols. The arrays are designed to be readily adaptable to standard high throughput screening systems. The IEBA technology can be used with existing bioassays protocols (particularly the bioassays on beads), and readers without the need to invest in a flow cytometer or other capital-intensive devices to read it out.

== Recognition ==
The company has been recognized for its scientific advancements and entrepreneurial drive. Some awards the company received include:

- In 2008, proof of concept grant from the National Research Foundation.
- In 2010, S$200,000 SMART Singapore–MIT alliance of Research and Technology Innovation Award.
- In 2010, first prize in Best of Biotech, a global life sciences business plan competition in Austria.
- In 2010, the company was included among the world's top 50 most promising startup companies by the US-based Kauffman Foundation, often described as the world's largest foundation devoted to entrepreneurship.
- In 2011, Skolkovo Award in INSEAD's 21st Business Venture Competition.
- In 2013, runner-up award in the Asian Entrepreneurship Award held in Japan.
- In 2013, GründerChampions (Founder Champions) KfW North Rhine-Westphalia regional award, which rewards successful new "creative and sustainable business ideas that create social value", given during the German Founders and Entrepreneurs Days.
- in 2014, S$100,000 Promising NUS Start-up Award. This was as part of the Innovation & Enterprise (I&E) Awards organized by the NUS Enterprise and The National University of Singapore Society (NUSS). The organizers stated that the winners were "the start-ups that we believe have the greatest potential to scale and make a real impact through their products and technologies".
