= Internorm =

Austrian door and window manufacturer

Internorm International GmbH
- Company type: Gmbh
- Founded: 1931
- Founder: Eduard Klinger Sr.
- Headquarters: Traun (Linz-Land District), Austria
- Products: Windows and Doors
- Number of employees: 1,800
- Website: https://www.internorm.com/

Internorm International GmbH is an Austrian brand founded in 1931 that specializes in the manufacture of windows and doors. Its headquarters are located in Traun, Upper Austria. The company is a family business, currently run by the third generation.

Internorm distributes its products through 10 sales offices and more than 1,300 selected sales partners in 22 countries. 55% of its sales are generated through exports.

== History ==
Internorm started when its founder, Eduard Klinger Sr. established a building and construction workshop in Linz, in 1931. In the following years, Eduard Klinger Sr. expanded his company from a one-man operation to a medium-sized metal construction company. In 1963, seeing the potential of pioneering products made from UPVC (unplasticized polyvinyl chloride), he acquired the first license for the construction of UPVC window frames in Austria.

The company, under the name of "Internorm", started producing UPVC windows in 1966. The first production site was in Traun, the location of the company's headquarters. In 1967, Eduard Klinger Sr. gave each of his three children, Eleonore, Eduard and Helmut a 25% holding in the company. Under the leadership of the second generation, Internorm developed into the market leader for windows and doors in Austria. The rapid growth of the company required a second production site, which Internorm found through the acquisition in 1977 of a local window manufacturer in Sarleinsbach. A third plant was set up in Lannach, Styria, in 1982. In 1988, the first Internorm timber windows were produced in this plant. Today, the plant specializes in Timber/Aluminium products.

In 1997, the 2nd generation left the operations side of the business and joined the supervisory board, each being replaced by one of their children – Anette Klinger, Christian Klinger and Stephan Kubinger – on the executive board. In 2001, Internorm reached a figure of 10 million products sold.

In 2002, Internorm founded the "International Windows Network (IFN)", a new umbrella company to which Internorm belongs to. Other independent and specialist companies emerged alongside Internorm with the goal of developing synergies for sharing knowledge and innovations. The group has around 2,900 employees, with approximately 1,800 of them working at Internorm.

== Distribution ==
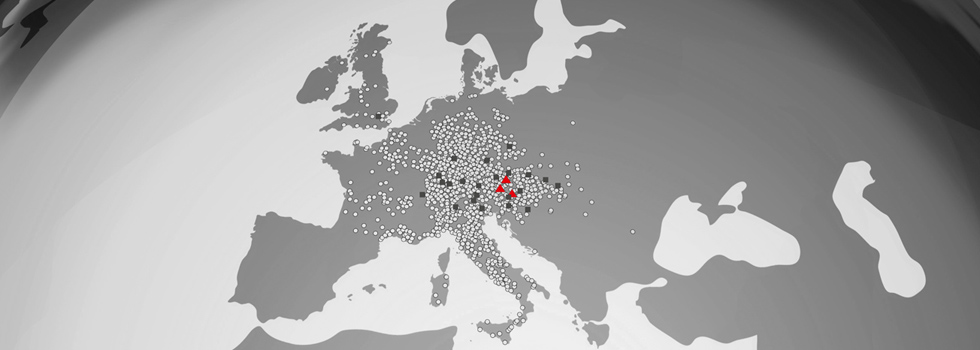
Internorm's sales partners, branches, and factories at a glance.

Internorm has its own sales offices in Austria, Germany, Switzerland, Italy, France, Slovenia, Croatia, Hungary, the Czech Republic, Slovakia and Great Britain. Through a two-stage distribution process, the Austrian products are sold in Europe through more than 1,000 sales partners in the mentioned countries, as well as in Luxembourg, Liechtenstein, Belgium, Romania, Poland, Denmark, the Netherlands, Greece and Ireland. All of Internorm's products are produced in Austria through its three production sites.

== Product ==
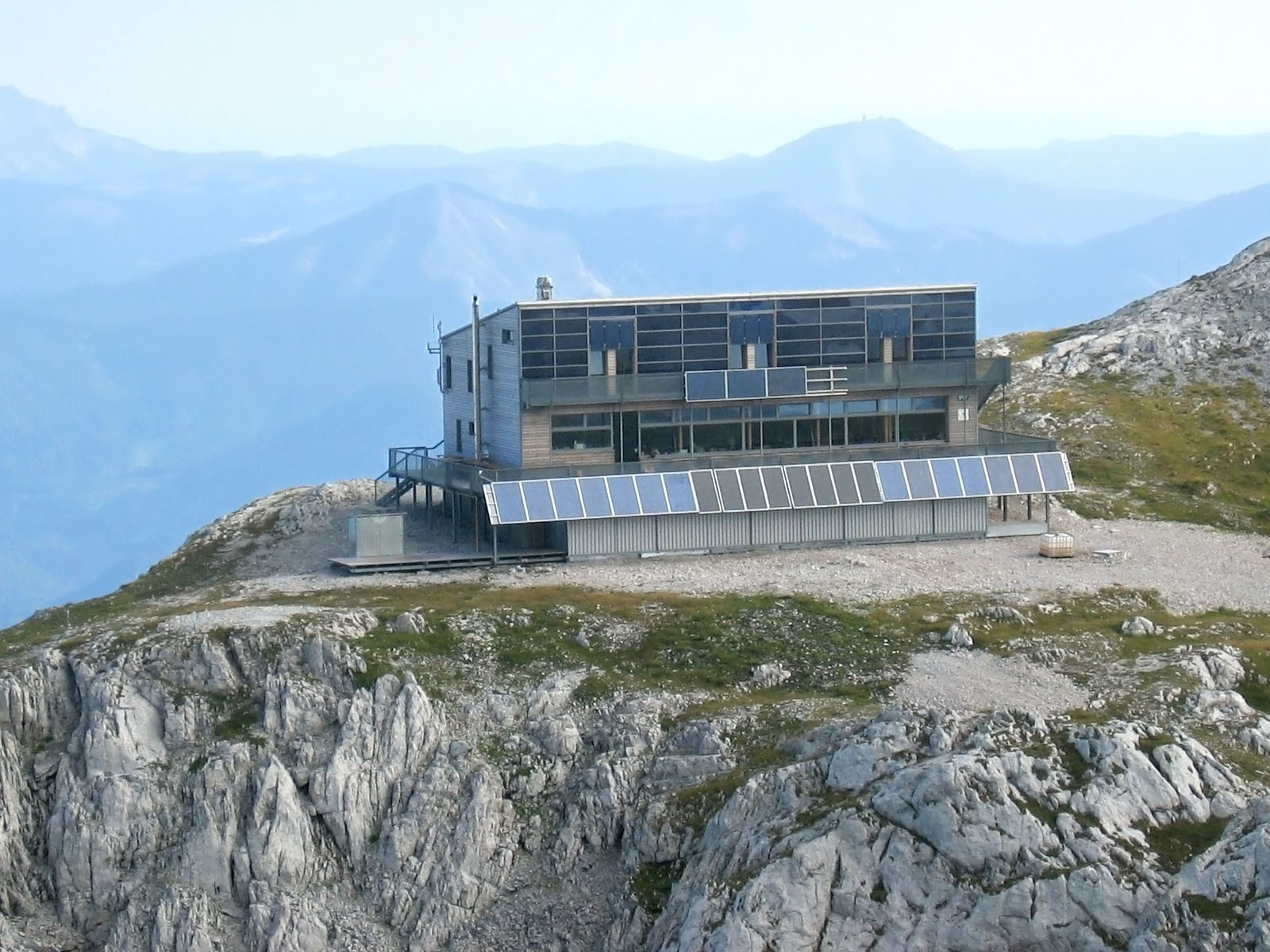
Schiestlhaus: A passive house with windows and doors from Internorm

The range of products includes UPVC, UPVC/aluminium and timber/aluminium windows as well as house doors made from aluminium and timber/aluminium. Internorm also manufactures sliding, balcony and side entrance doors and a range of accessories such as sun protection, insect repellent and window and door handles.

The products are marketed in four design styles: Studio, Home Pure, Home Soft and Ambiente.

In 2012, Internorm launched a series of technologies marketed under the name "I-tec". These include a new locking system with invisible fitting and higher safety, a ventilation system integrated into the window and an energy-efficient shading system for composite windows. With an intelligent building control, the Internorm products can be conveniently controlled via tablet or smartphone.

== Facilities ==
The headquarters of "International Window Network (IFN)" and "Internorm International GmbH" are located at the Traun site. The management, the board of directors and all the administrative sectors are located here. In addition to UPVC and UPVC/aluminium windows, specialized UPVC products (round and angular windows), windows with integrated blinds, aluminium window shutters, aluminium doors and insulating glass are manufactured here.

The plant in Sarleinsbach was opened in 1977. Internorm is the largest employer in this region with around 650 employees. More than 3,000 units of UPVC and UPVC/Aluminium windows are manufactured here per day.

In the Lannach production plant, the manufacture of timber/aluminium windows and timber/aluminium doors takes place. This location is also home to the Internorm sales office for the southern region.
