= Kontron Group =

- Company type: AG
- ISIN: AT0000A0E9W5
- Industry: IT Consulting and Services
- Founded: 2008
- Headquarters: Linz, Austria
- Key people: Hannes Niederhauser, CEO; Michael Jeske, COO Richard Neuwirth, CFO
- Revenue: € 990,9 mil.(31.12.2018)
- Number of employees: 4,335 (31.12.2018)
- Website: group.kontron.com

The Kontron Group (until May 2022: S&T) of enterprises is an IT consulting, products and services provider with its head office in Linz, Austria.

== Company history ==
S&T was founded by Thomas Streimelweger and Karl Tantscher in 1993. The company started up in Slovakia, Bulgaria and Ukraine and other branches were established over the next few years in Romania, Moldova and Yugoslavia. In the early years, S&T specialized in the sale of IT computer hardware and software, as a distributor for Hewlett Packard but they turned their focus to IT consulting and services in 2000.

S&T's initial public offering took place on the EASDAQ (now NASDAQ Europe) in 1998. Following on from this, the company grew by setting up branches and through the acquisition of other companies. In 1999, for example, S&T expanded its presence into Slovenia, Croatia, Bosnia-Herzegovina and Macedonia by purchasing Hermes Plus. Not long afterwards, the branch in Slovenia was merged with the acquired e-business company ICOS. S&T also set up a branch in Hungary that same year.

From 1999, S&T became involved with the sale of medical products and is Philips' exclusive distribution partner for medical products in Bulgaria, Croatia, the Czech Republic, Moldova, Romania and Slovakia. To break into this sector, the company purchased HP's medical products business unit. Medical Systems Business, as it was called at the time, was taken over by Agilent Technologies when HP split into two companies in 1999. In 2002, Agilent sold the medical business unit to Philips. The two smallest business units in this sector (Chemical Analysis and Electronic Testing and Measuring Systems) were sold again one year later.

The company gained a branch in Ukraine with the acquisition of Soft-Tronik in 2000, and acquired one in Poland by purchasing Largo Systems. S&T founded S&T International in Russia in the same year. In 2001, S&T bought Aster in Slovenia, INNET in Hungary, Neos Computer in the Czech Republic and Netway Computer Systems in Romania. In 2002, they expanded further into Latvia and Montenegro and also into Turkey with the takeover of Protek. Epsilon in Croatia and Atlantis in Slovenia were taken over in 2003, as were Fujitsu Services branches in six countries. S&T moved from the EASDAQ to the Vienna Stock Exchange in the same year.

The purchase of ITS Intertrade Sistemi d.o.o. in Slovenia took place in 2004, InfoNET Project d.o.o. in Croatia in 2005 and 2006 saw a total of four takeovers: S&T purchased the IT activities of T-System in Turkey, took over Unitis in Hungary, the Grall Group in the Czech Republic and BEELC in Poland. In the same year, S&T withdrew from the markets in Malta, Greece and Switzerland. A few months later, Switzerland became part of the S&T group of enterprises once more, when S&T took over the SAP consulting company IMG The Information Management Group in spring 2007. The US subsidiary of IMG was sold again in September 2007.

Announced on October 3, 2012 was the merger between the S&T and the Quanmax groups, with the latter taking over the former. The merger was concluded on December 12, 2012. It entailed S&T System Integration & Technology Distribution AG's being merged into Quanmax AG, which was subsequently renamed S&T AG.

S&T entered the smart energy sector in 2014. It took stakes in Networked Energy Services Corp. and in Affair OOO, and purchased ubitronix system solutions GmbH.

On September 19, 2016, S&T AG's stock was incorporated into the Frankfurt Stock Exchange's TecDAX index.

In October 2016 S&T acquired the IT market customers segment of Austria's Raiffeisen-Informatik group. These customers comprise those not belonging to the Raiffeisen group and served by its Raiffeisen IT one. Its portfolio of services include computer center and SAP operation, and, as well, consulting and software development, with the latter being in the area of collaboration management software.

In 2017, S&T took a stake in Kontron, a Germany-headquartered manufacturer of embedded computers. The purchase was predominantly financed by Foxconn, the Taiwan-headquartered provider of commissioned manufacturing services. Foxconn had taken a 29% stake in S&T AG in 2016. On August 17, 2017, Kontron was merged into S&T; "Kontron" is being maintained as a brand.

According to the Dutch OSINT platform Datenna, Foxconn's stake in S&T led to a low risk of state influence on S&T by the Chinese government.

On 24 October 2019, S&T acquired AIS Automation. On 30 July 2020, S&T acquired Iskratel for Euro 37.5 million. Subsequently, S&T Slovenia was merged with Iskratel and has been operating under the name S&T Iskratel since 1 September 2020.

At the conclusion of the Annual General Meeting on 6 May 2022, it was decided that S&T AG would be renamed Kontron AG. The name change became effective 1 June 2022.
