= New Venture Championship =

The New Venture Championship (NVC) was an international entrepreneurial investment competition for graduate students presented by the University of Oregon's Lundquist Center for Entrepreneurship.

Teams from across the world went to Portland, Oregon, United States to present and defend business plans to a panel of judges for the chance to win the grand prize of $25,000. All NVC competitors received invaluable advice from world class judges and received various cash prizes to help them turn their plans into a successful business.

== History ==
The first ever NVC was held in 1992. Only three teams competed and it was held in a university classroom at the University of Oregon campus. The grand prize was $300.

In 2008, over 70 teams submitted entries to compete for more than $70,000 in prizes and for a place in both the 2008 Global Moot Corp. and the 2009 NVC Competition. Only the top 20 teams of about 60 applicants are selected to present in Portland each year.

In April 2007, Columbia Sportswear CEO Tim Boyle and his wife, Mary, donated a total of $5 million to the University of Oregon. $3.5 million went to the New Venture Championship.

In 2023, the University of Oregon replaced the New Venture Championship (NVC) with the Oregon Innovation Challenge.

== Past winners ==
In 2013, NVC unexpectedly had two first place winners. AGcerez from Thailand’s Sasin Graduate Institute of Business Administration and Awair from Stanford University were named 2013 NVC co-champions. AGcerez introduced a fruit syrup with helpful bacteria to aid digestion and Awair presented Wyshbone, a device that delivers local anesthetic to patients' throats using breathing tubes.

Other past winners include KT Tape, Klymit Backpacking Gear and Split Engineering.

== Structure ==
Teams of graduate students participate. Sixteen teams compete in the six-round business competition during which teams present their business ideas, give a 60 second elevator pitch, create and staff a trade show booth, and receive extensive feedback from a team of judges. Judges are a mix of business professionals, many from sponsoring companies.

Sponsors for NVC have changed and the number increased during the years of the competition. The 2014 sponsors included Columbia Sportswear, Viewpoint, Tektronix, OEN, Blue Star Gas, Palo Alto Software and Rogue.

== See also ==
- Best of Biotech
