= List of largest Austrian companies =

This article lists the largest companies in Austria in terms of revenue, net profit and total assets, according to the American business magazines Fortune and Forbes.

== 2023 Fortune Europe list ==
This list displays all Austrian companies in the Fortune Europe 500, which ranks Europe's largest companies by annual revenue. The figures below are given in millions of US dollars and are for the fiscal year 2022. Also listed are the headquarters location, net profit, number of employees worldwide and industry sector of each company.

Rank	Name	Industry	Revenue	Profits	Employees	Headquarters
Rank	Name	Industry	(US$ millions)		Employees	Headquarters
1	OMV Group	Oil and Gas	41,696	3,897	22,308	Vienna
2	Voestalpine	Steel		1,109	51,202	Linz
3	Strabag	Construction	17,907	497	73,740	Vienna
4	Erste Group	Banking	16,655	2,277	45,485	Vienna
5	Raiffeisen Bank International	Banking	13,538	3,815	56,000	Vienna
6	Borealis AG	Chemicals	12,858	5,005	7,572	Vienna
7	Vienna Insurance Group	Insurance	11,476	490	28,832	Vienna
8	Verbund	Utilities	10,882	1,806	3,585	Vienna
9	Andritz AG	Industrial processing	8,085	431	29,094	Graz
10	Uniqa Insurance Group	Insurance	7,047	403	14,515	Vienna
11	Porr	Construction	6,345	83	20,136	Vienna

== 2024 Forbes list ==
This list is based on the Forbes Global 2000, which ranks the world's 2,000 largest publicly traded companies. The Forbes list takes into account a multitude of factors, including the revenue, net profit, total assets and market value of each company; each factor is given a weighted rank in terms of importance when considering the overall ranking. The table below also lists the headquarters location and industry sector of each company. The figures are in billions of US dollars and are for the year 2023. All nine companies from Austria are listed.

Rank	Forbes 2000 rank	Name	Industry	Revenue	Profits	Assets	Value	Headquarters
Rank	Forbes 2000 rank	Name	Industry	(US$ billions)				Headquarters
1	292	Erste Group	Banking	26.1	3.3	370.1	20.6	Vienna
2	474	OMV Group	Oil and Gas	39.8	1.7	55.4	19.6	Vienna
3	647	Raiffeisen Bank International	Banking	16.2	2.5	219.7	6.3	Vienna
4	733	Verbund	Utilities	10.0	2.4	21.9	27.3	Vienna
5	1040	Vienna Insurance Group	Insurance	13.4	0.6	51.9	8.7	Vienna
6	1290	Voestalpine	Steel	18.4	0.7	18.2	4.9	Linz
7	1352	Strabag	Construction	19.1	0.7	15.6	4.5	Vienna
8	1358	BAWAG P.S.K.	Banking	3.3	0.7	61.3	5.1	Vienna
9	1984	Uniqa Insurance Group	Insurance	6.7	0.3	31.6	2.8	Vienna

== See also ==
- Economy of Austria
- List of companies of Austria
- List of largest companies by revenue
