= Pfahnl =

Austrian company

- Native name: Pfahnl Backmittel GmbH
- Industry: Mill
- Founded: 1472
- Headquarters: Halmenberg 13, 4230 Pregarten, Upper Austria, Austria
- Key people: Andreas Pfahnl
- Website: www.pfahnl.eu/en.html

Pfahnl is a traditional mill company in Pregarten, Austria. The first written record about it is from 1472; it has belonged to the Pfahnl family for 18 generations. Andreas and Herbert Pfahnl continue the production. Production includes:

- high-quality flours (wheat, rye, organic)
- ready-to-use flour
- pastry products (cream and decora products, pastry mixes, pastry products, concentrates and premixes), etc.

Daily about 240 tonnes of grain are ground to a wheat and a rye flour.

== See also ==
- List of oldest companies
