= G.L. Pharma =

Austrian pharmaceutical company

G.L. Pharma GmbH
- Company type: GmbH
- Industry: Pharmaceuticals
- Founded: 1947
- Headquarters: Lannach, Austria
- Key people: Ilse Bartenstein, Martin Bartenstein, Johann Danklmaier
- Revenue: €195 million (2020)
- Number of employees: approx. 910
- Website: gl-pharma.com

G.L. Pharma (also known as Gerot Lannach) is an Austrian pharmaceutical company headquartered in Lannach, Styria. The company manufactures pharmaceuticals for a wide range of therapeutic areas, including the treatment of allergies, bacterial infections, diabetes, cancer, chronic pain and Parkinson's disease. It also produces Potassium iodide tablets used for iodine thyroid blocking in the event of a nuclear incident involving the release of radioactive ^{131}I.

In 2019, the company recorded the largest single order in its history when the German Federal Office for Radiation Protection ordered 190 million iodine tablets as a precautionary measure in case of a major nuclear emergency involving the release of ^{131}I.

G.L. Pharma traces its origins to the Lannacher Heilmittel GmbH, founded in 1947 in Lannach. The company was acquired in 1966 by Leopold and Hannelore Bartenstein. In 1997, the Vienna-based pharmaceutical manufacturer Gerot Pharmazeutika was purchased. Both companies were merged in 2009 to form G.L. Pharma under the brand name Gerot Lannach.

In spring 2019, G.L. Pharma began expanding its production facilities in Lannach. The investment, intended to create space for 100 new jobs, was valued at €60 million.

G.L. Pharma is headquartered in Lannach Castle and is a subsidiary of Bahopharm GmbH, which is owned by the Bartenstein family. Genericon Pharma is a sister company of G.L. Pharma GmbH under the Bahopharm group.
