= Pewag group =

pewag group
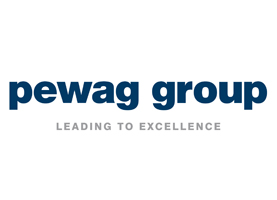
- Type: Corporate group
- Industry: Metal processing industry
- Headquarters: Klagenfurt, Carinthia, Austria
- Revenue: > € 120 million (Technical chains) > € 30 million (Snow chains)
- Number of employees: 1,000
- Website: www.pewag.com www.pewag-group.com

The pewag group is an internationally operating group of companies. Its track record goes back to the year 1479.

== History ==
The pewag group is one of the oldest chain manufacturers in the world and its history can be traced back to the 15th century. The operations of the group which occupies about 1,000 employees all over the world and references of a forging plant in Brückl, were first documented in 1479. In 1787 a chain forge was founded in Kapfenberg and in 1803 another one was founded in Graz. About 30 years later an iron casting plant was established in Brückl and the first snow chain worldwide was produced.
After 10 years, the name “pewag” was created and at the same time, the plants in Graz and Kapfenberg were merged. In the seventies a sale company was founded, both in Germany and the United States.
In 1994, exactly one year since the establishment of the pewag Austria GmbH, the first subsidiary was founded in the Czech Republic. In 1999 the Weissenfels Group was acquired, which was separated again four years later. In 2005 the group was split into Schneeketten Beteiligungs AG, which is producing snow chains, and pewag Austria GmbH, which is manufacturing technical chains. In 2009 Chaineries Limousines S.A.S. was acquired.

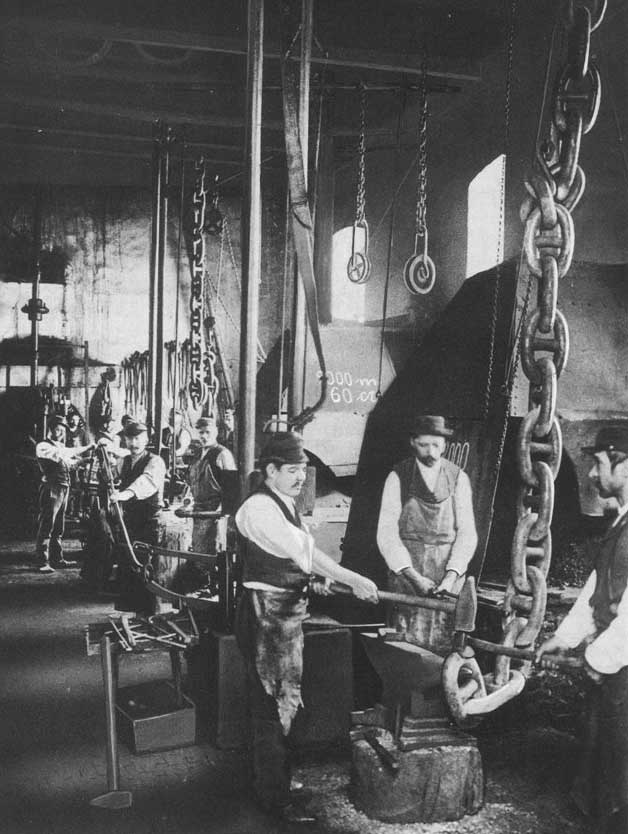
Anchor chain forge with three drop hammers as it was used 1878 in the chain plant in Brückl

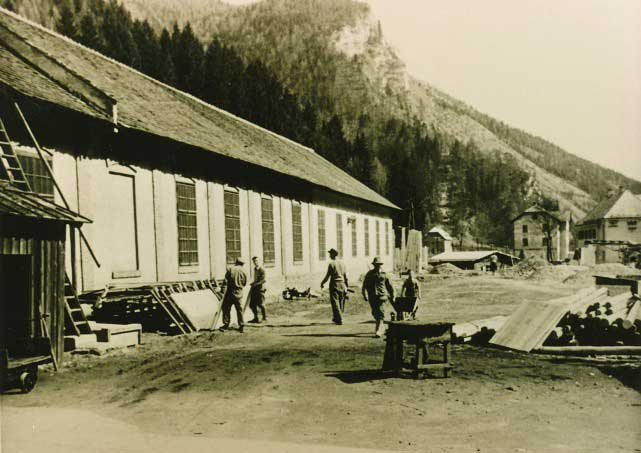
Building of the first hall in 1955

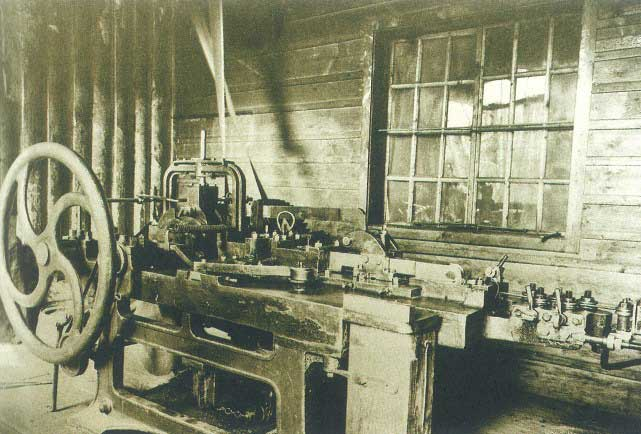
Chain bending machine in the chain factory Hansenhuette 1915

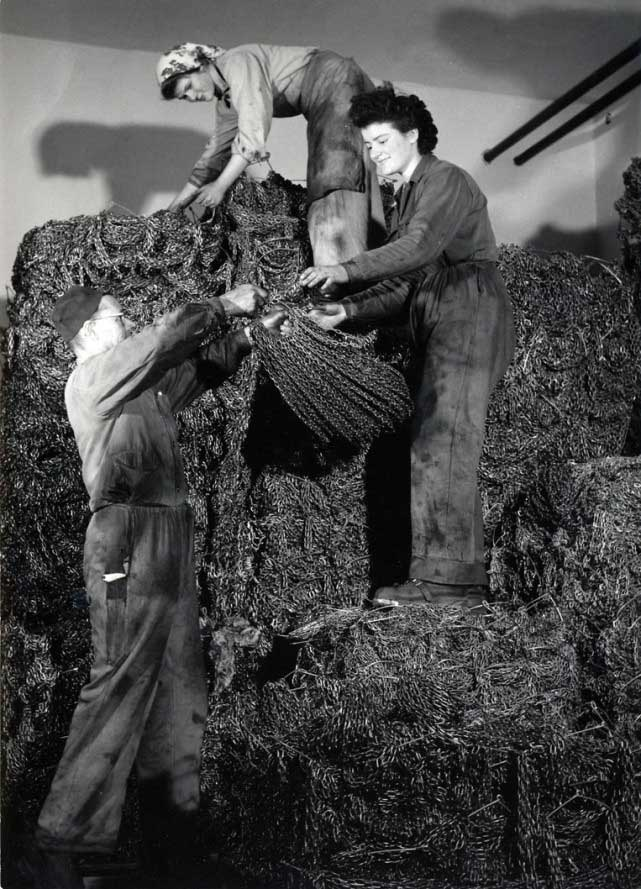
Workers in a chain storage around 1959

== Locations ==
=== Locations in Europe ===
- Austria
- Germany
- France
- Italy
- Netherlands
- Poland
- Portugal
- Russia
- Sweden
- Slovakia
- Czech Republic
- Ukraine

=== Locations in the US ===
- Bolingbrook, Illinois
- Rocklin, California
- Pueblo, Colorado

Locations in America

- Colombia

- Brazil

== Business areas of the pewag group ==
The group has a range of products and services, which is organized in six segments. The range of products varies from traction chains for tires, over different industrial chains, to products for the do-it-yourself sector.

=== Segment A – Snow and forestry chains ===
Segment A contains chains for passenger cars, buses utility and military vehicles, tractors and special vehicles.

=== Segment B – Hoist and conveyor chains ===
In this category the group offers a variety of customized service features as well as high class chain systems like profile steel chains, case hardened chains, rust- and acid-proof hoist chains, which are suitable for the chemical and food industry.

=== Segment C – Do-it-yourself ===
This segment includes do-it-yourself, agriculture and forestry products like wires and ropes, rings and swivels, shackles and links, hooks, sheaves, belt brackets, nails, and cattle chains.

=== Segment D – Engineering ===
The different products and services of segment D include a wide range of application in engineering and plant manufacturing. The assortment contains sprocket chains, wheels and wheel discs, spur wheels, spur racks, bevel gears, chain tighteners, clutches, sliding hubs, tooth belts and discs, clamping sets and other components.

=== Segment F – Lifting accessories and lashing chains ===
Segment F contains products and services for lifting, moving and saving goods.

=== Segment G – Tire protection chains ===
Products of this segment are tire protection chains for open-pit mining, underground mining and tunneling, quarrying, traction and slag and scrap handling.

== Sustainability ==
The pewag group continuously improves its own ecological policy, to keep the influence of the enterprise on the environment as low as possible. When investing in new machines the group considers the technically most adequate and economically feasible state-of-the-art designs for their designated area of use. The environmental management is certified according to ISO 14001:2004.
