= Meusburger Georg GmbH & Co KG =

Austrian mould base parts manufacturer

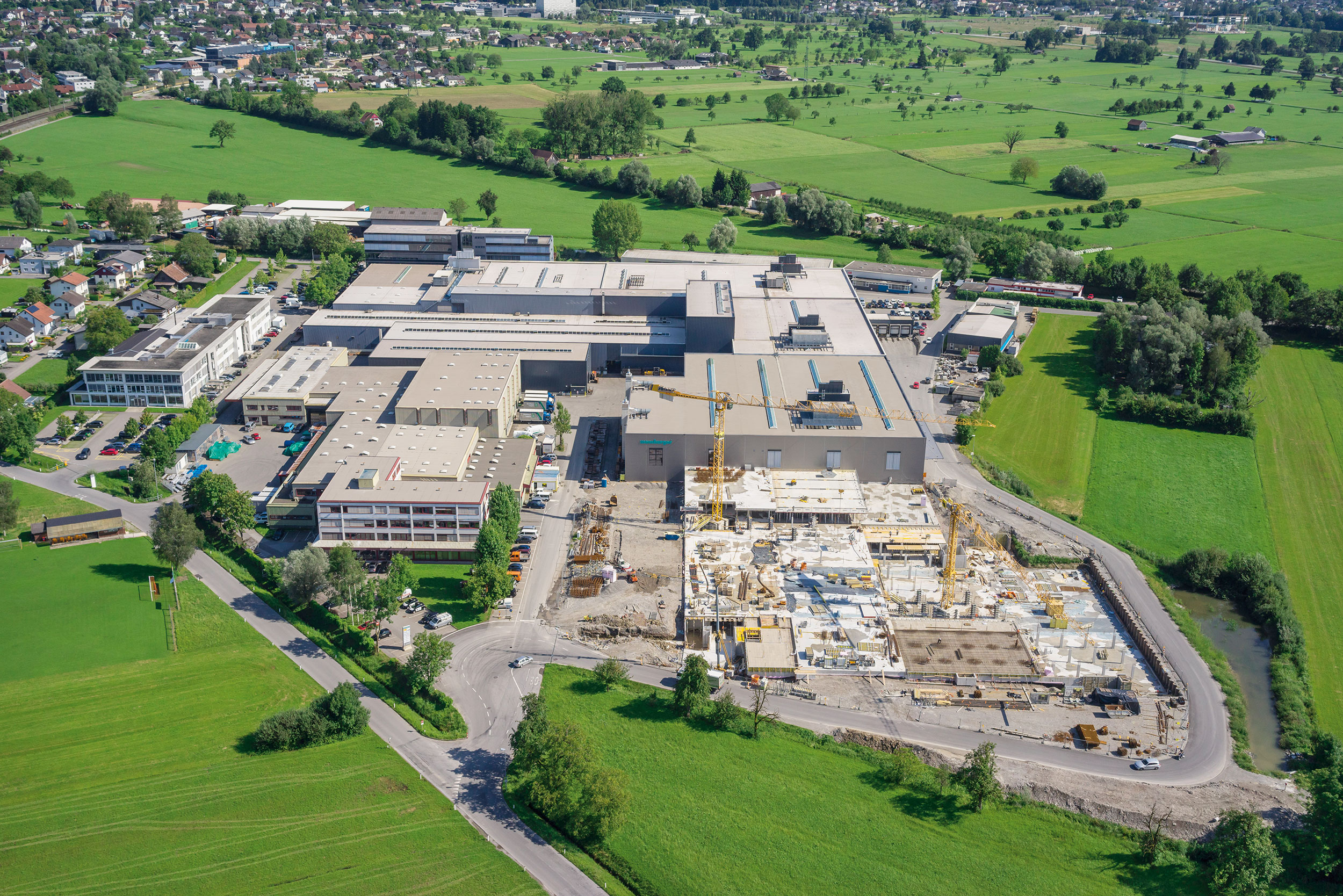
- Headquarters Meusburger Georg GmbH & Co KG (September 2016)
- Type: GmbH & Co KG
- Industry: Standard parts manufacturer and provider of workshop equipment
- Founded: 1964; 62 years ago
- Founder: Georg Meusburger
- Headquarters: Wolfurt, Vorarlberg, Austria
- Key people: Guntram Meusburger (Managing Director)
- Revenue: € 302 Mio. (2022)
- Number of employees: over 1,700 (2022)
- Website: www.meusburger.com

Meusburger Georg GmbH & Co KG is an Austrian manufacturer of standard parts for mould bases and die sets with more than 24,000 customers worldwide. The company was founded in 1964 as a one-man business in Dornbirn (Austria) and is today still a family business. The products are used in mould making and die making as the basis for production tools.

== History ==
The company was founded in 1964 in Dornbirn by Georg Meusburger. In 1978 the production of standard mould bases began and the first catalogue was produced. In 1980 the company moved to the newly built company building in Wolfurt with a total floor space of 3,200 m^{2}. It employed 35 employees at the time. In 2007, Guntram Meusburger took over the management. At that time the company employed 260 employees and generated a turnover of €73 million. The area of business Standard parts for die making was introduced in 2010. The turnover then amounted to €98 million, which was generated by 380 employees. In 2013 Meusburger Georg became the market leader in the area of standard parts with 700 employees and a turnover of €160 million.

In the middle of June 2016, Meusburger took over the German hot runner specialist PSG Plastic Service GmbH with locations in Viernheim and Seckach and a foreign branch in China. About 200 members of staff were taken over and PSG continues to operate as an independent enterprise.

== Locations ==
Since 1980, Wolfurt, Austria has been the headquarters of Meusburger. In 1992 the first high-bay warehouse and in 2003 a new office building was built there. The first production location outside of the headquarters has just been built in Lingenau, Austria. The focus of the new location is special machining. The production area covers 4,300 m^{2}.

== Sales branches ==
- 2010 Wuxi, China: Meusburger Precision Standard Mould (Wuxi) Co., Ltd.
- 2011 Kadıköy, Turkey: Meusburger Kalıp Setleri ve Elemanları Ticaret ve San. Ltd. Şti.
- 2012 Charlotte, USA: Meusburger US, Inc. Standard molds
- 2014 Bangalore, India: Meusburger India Pvt Ltd.
- 2015 Querétaro, Mexico: Meusburger México S. de R.L. de C.V.
- 2019 Viernheim, Deutschland: Meusburger Deutschland GmbH

== Products ==
Meusburger is a manufacturer of plates and accessories for die and mould making. The steel is heat treated for stress relief using three furnaces with a daily capacity of 240 tonnes which enables reduced plate warping during machining. Since 2010 Meusburger has offered standard parts for die making, in 2013 the field of workshop equipment was introduced.

== Training ==
The company has two in-house training workshops, for the training of apprentices in various technical trades. All apprentices are in dual training. At the moment milling technicians, mechanical engineering technicians, production technicians, process technicians, electrical engineering technicians for plant and industrial engineering, metal workers and information technology technicians area trained.
