= Engel Austria =

Austrian company

Engel Austria GmbH
- Type: GmbH (100% family-owned)
- Industry: Injection moulding machinery
- Founded: 1945 by Ludwig Engel
- Headquarters: Schwertberg, Austria
- Key people: Stefan Engleder (CEO), Simon Zeilberger (CFO), Gerhard Dimmler (CTO), Gerhard Stangl (CPO)
- Products: Injection moulding machines, automation systems
- Revenue: €1.4 billion (2025/26)
- Number of employees: approx. 7,000 (2025/26)
- Website: www.engelglobal.com

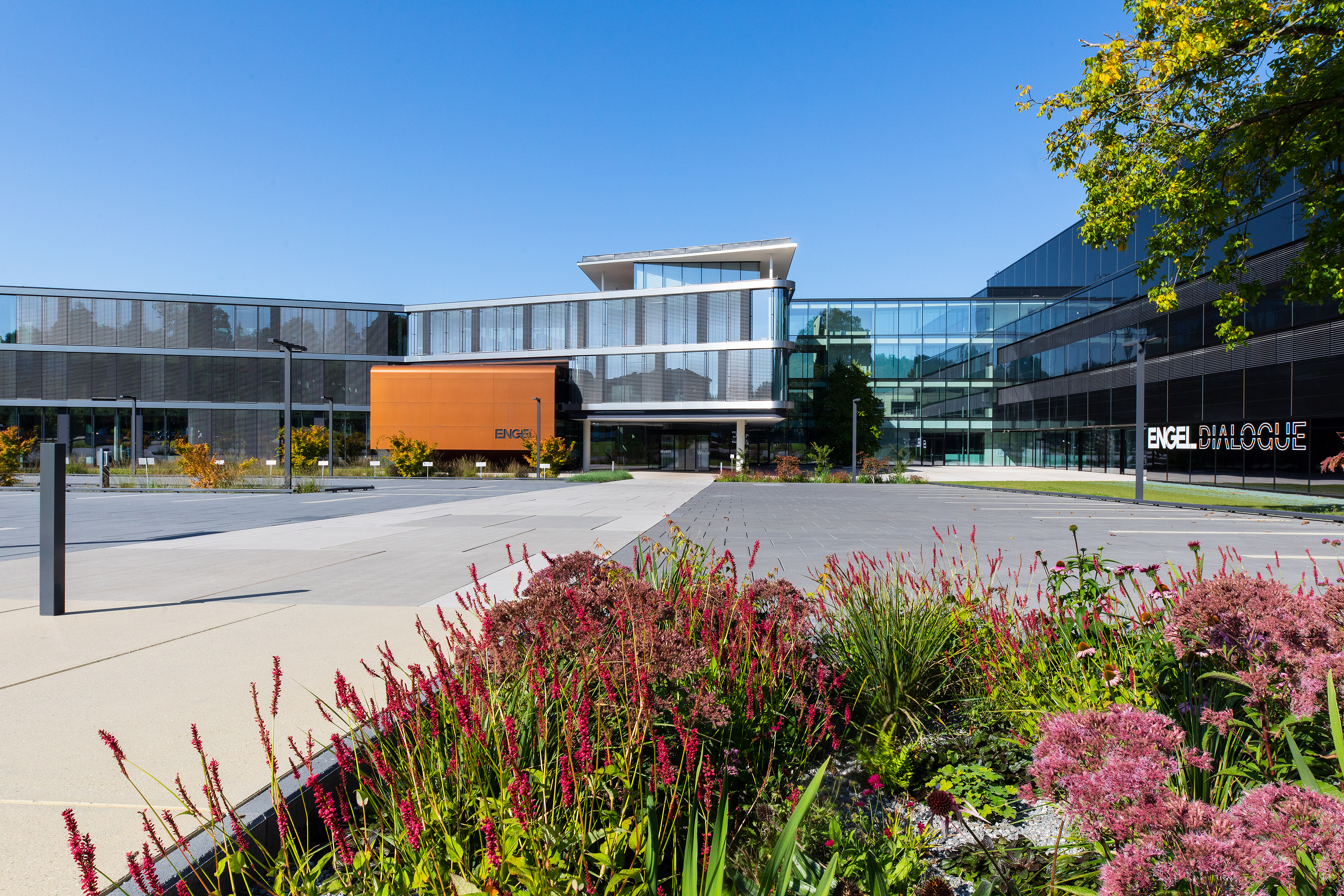
Company headquarters in Schwertberg (2021)

Engel Austria GmbH (stylized as ENGEL AUSTRIA) is an Austrian manufacturer of injection moulding machines and associated automation systems headquartered in Schwertberg, Upper Austria.

== Operations ==
Engel employs approximately 7,000 people worldwide. The machines produced in its Austrian plants are almost exclusively for export; the export rate was approximately 95 percent in the 2025/26 fiscal year. Engel offers injection moulding machines as well as integrated and automated production cells for processing thermoplastics, thermosets, and elastomers.

Since its founding in 1945, Engel Austria has remained entirely family-owned.

== History ==
The company was founded in 1945 by Ludwig Engel, a Danube Swabian, as a locksmith shop in Schwertberg. From 1948, it began manufacturing punching machines for processing leather and other materials. In 1951, the company built its first injection moulding machine featuring a hand-lever clamping unit and water-hydraulic drive injection.

Following the founder's death, his daughter Irene and her husband Georg Schwarz took over management, continuing the company's international expansion. By 1970, the number of foreign representations had increased to forty locations.

In the late 1980s, the large machine plant in St. Valentin was opened, enabling the production of machines with a clamping force exceeding 3,000 tons. In 1997, Peter Neumann took over operational management. Under his leadership, Engel expanded significantly into Asia, establishing new production plants in China and South Korea, as well as the secondary brand Wintec. In 2000, the supplier plant in Kaplice, Czech Republic, was opened. On January 1, 2024, the subsidiary "Technische Informationssysteme" (TIG) was fully integrated.

== Locations ==
Engel operates 12 production plants across Europe, North America, and Asia, with subsidiaries and representatives in over 85 countries.

=== Production Plants ===
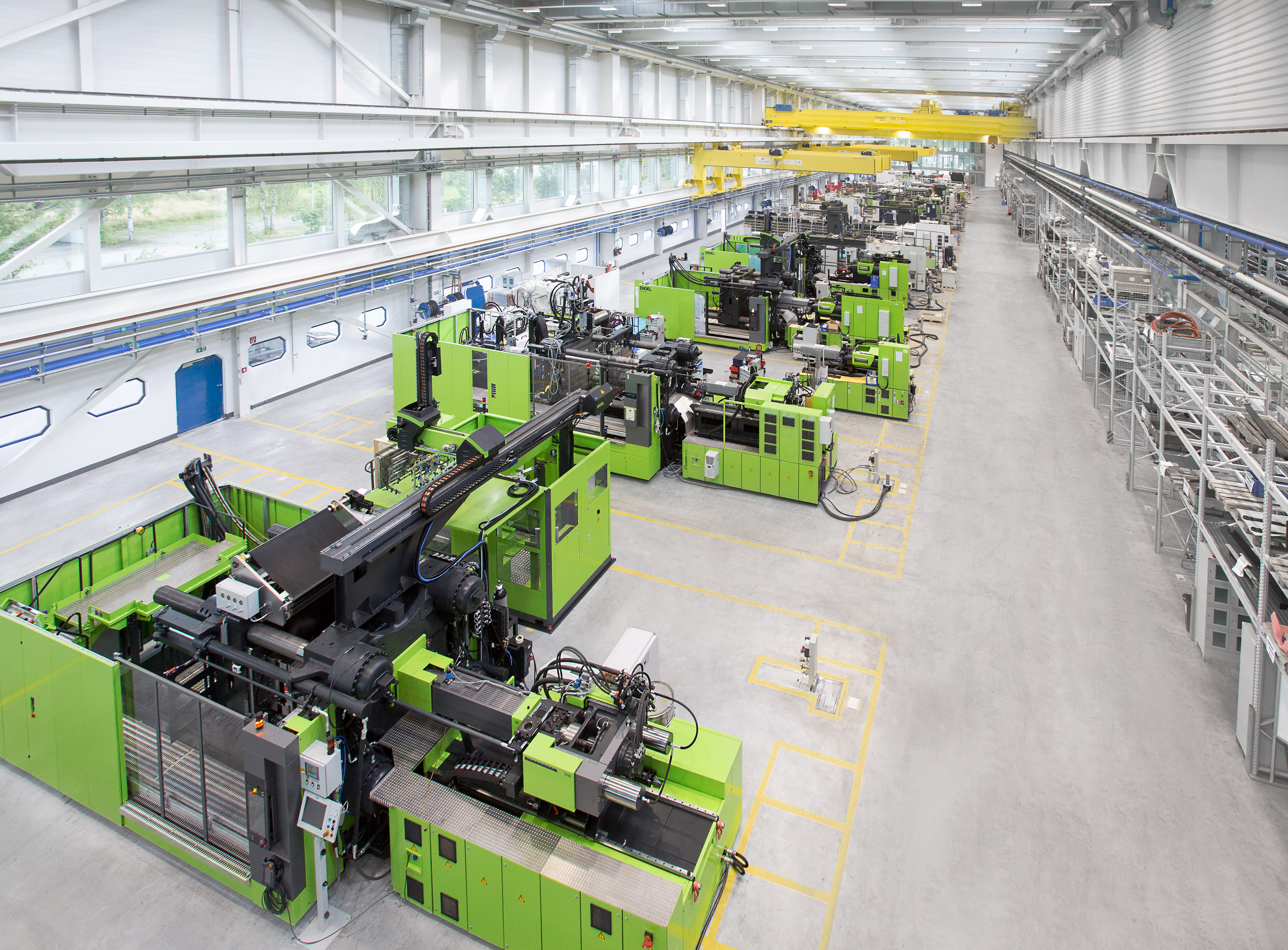
Workshop floor with Engel injection moulding machines (2020)

- Engel Austria GmbH, Schwertberg, Austria: Headquarters and main production plant.
- Engel Austria GmbH, St. Valentin, Austria: Production of large-scale machinery .
- Engel Austria GmbH, Dietach, Austria: Production of automation systems and components.
- Engel Strojirenska s.r.o., Kaplice, Czech Republic: Supplier plant.
- Engel Machinery Inc., York, USA: Production of large-scale machinery.
- Engel Machinery Korea Ltd., Pyeongtaek, South Korea: Production of injection moulding machines.
- Engel Machinery Shanghai Co. Ltd., Shanghai, China: Production of large-scale machinery.
- Engel Machinery (Changzhou) Co. Ltd., Changzhou, China: Production of small and medium machines (Engel and Wintec brands).
- Engel Machinery México, S.A. DE C.V., Mexico: Production of all-electric small machines and hydraulic two-platen large machines.
- TMA Automation Sp. z o.o., Gdańsk, Poland: Production of robots and automation
- Electronica Plastic Machines Pvt. Ltd., Pune, India: Production of injection moulding machines
- ENGEL Mašinska industrija doo Kikinda, Kikinda, Serbia: Production of machined components

=== Subsidiaries ===
- ENGEL Used Machinery GmbH, Schwertberg, Austria: Sales of used machines
