= Ammerer Bed Company =

Austrian family business in the eighth generation

- Trade name: Betten-Ammerer Gesellschaft m.b.H. & Co. KG
- Native name: Betten Ammerer
- Type: GmbH, Privately held company
- Industry: Textile, Mattresses and Beds
- Founded: 1763; 263 years ago
- Headquarters: Ried im Innkreis (Upper Austria), Austria
- Number of locations: 11 branches
- Area served: Austria, Europe
- Key people: Stefan Matthias Ammerer, Martin Friedrich Ammerer
- Services: Bed sanitisation; Upholstery; Mattress delivery and disposal; Monogram Embroidery; Textile; Financial services; 3D room planning
- Number of employees: 60
- Website: www.ammerer.com

Ammerer Bed Company (Betten Ammerer in German) is an Austrian family business operating in its eighth generation, established in 1763. Specialising in sleeping systems and textile design, their services encompass a range of activities including a curtain-sewing workshop, bed sanitisation, furniture upholstery, home servicing, mattress delivery and disposal, monogram embroidery, 3D room planning, as well as the organisation of wedding tables.

== History ==
- In 1763 Leopold Ammerer married into a “Posementierbetrieb” (a weavers-craft) in “Ried im Innkreis” and attained market rights. With his wife Mechtildis he founded Ammerer.
- In 1816 the parent company at the main square of Ried im Innkreis was acquired successfully by the second generation. Today the house accommodates the business including logistics, marketing and PR.
- In 1848 the third generation continued textile distribution.
- In 1949 the sixth generation of “Ammerers” moved the enterprise main focus to “Braunau am Inn” and founded branches in Salzburg, Mattighofen and in the Bavarian region. The outbuilding in Ried (today: main square #29) was acquired.
- In 1981 the headquarters shifted back to Ried. Today the seventh generation is in charge.

== Expansion ==
There were two main phases of expansion:

- In the 1950s the family business was shifted to Braunau am Inn, Upper Austria. Afterwards branches were founded in Mattighofen, Salzburg and in the Bavarian region.
- The seventh generation shifted the company headquarters back to Ried in the Innkreis. Since the 1980s the company management enforced a massive expansion: branches were founded in Schärding, Griekirchen, Kirchdorf am Inn, Gmunden, Mauthausen, Ottensheim and Leonding.

By takeover of the company “Betten Kastner” in 1998 additional locations were established in Linz, Salzburg and Innsbruck.

The shop in Innsbruck was closed after some years because of the geographical distance to the headquarters. With the exception of the shift in Salzburg all locations are in Upper Austria.
