= Philoro =

Austrian precious metals company

philoro Holding GmbH
- Type: GmbH
- Industry: precious metal trade
- Founded: 2011
- Headquarters: Vienna, Austria
- Key people: Rudolf Brenner; René Brückler
- Products: bars and investment coins, storage options
- Revenue: €1.535bn (2022)
- Number of employees: 230 (2024)
- Website: philoro.at

Philoro (stylized as philoro) is an independent precious metals trading house and producer founded in 2011, with its headquarters in Vienna.

== History ==
The gold trading house philoro was founded in March 2011 by Rudolf Brenner (born 1976), originally from Leipzig, and René Brückler (born 1976), a native of Vienna.

In 2013, the company opened additional branches in Salzburg and Leipzig.

In 2019, Constantia Unternehmensbeteiligungen acquired a 40% stake in the company through a capital increase. In May 2022, philoro began the construction of a precious metal recycling facility in Korneuburg, Lower Austria. Additionally, a high-security storage facility was established, with investments in the site totalling at around €60 million. The philoro Gold Factory in Korneuburg was opened in December 2023 and has since been producing precious metal bars. Previously, the precious metal dealer had its bars manufactured by the Swiss company Valcambi.

In March 2023, philoro launched a 31.103-gram Phygital Asset Coin with an NFC chip called Crypto Vreneli, which functions as both a gold vreneli and an NFT. Since October 2023, the company has been cooperating with Swiss Post to offer services outside its business locations. This allows Swiss customers to purchase precious metal products, invest in precious metal subscriptions, or submit old gold for evaluation by philoro at post offices.

== Company structure ==
philoro is a trading house for gold and other precious metals, as well as a producer of its own products. It employs around 230 people and generated worldwide revenue of €1.535 billion in 2022. The company's headquarters are located in Vienna, Alsergrund. philoro is managed by the managing partners Rudolf Brenner and René Brückler.

The company has over 17 locations in the German-speaking region including Austria, Germany, Switzerland, and Liechtenstein, as well as branches in Hong Kong and New York City. Furthermore, the company operates its own online shop.

On 29 December 2023, the acquisition of 55% of the shares in philoro Holding GmbH by Kultas Beteiligungs GmbH in Vienna was registered with the Austrian Federal Competition Authority. Kultas Beteiligungs GmbH is primarily owned by Brückler Verwaltungs GmbH with 28.33% and Rudolf Brenner Holding GmbH with 54.22%. The Invest Unternehmensbeteiligungs Aktiengesellschaft (Invest AG) from Linz, the largest private equity fund in Austria, has also acquired 10.9% of Kultas Beteiligungs GmbH and holds certain co-determination rights – including regarding philoro Holding GmbH and its subsidiaries.

== Products and services ==
philoro offers services in the field of precious metal investment, including buying and selling, storage, and personal consultation. The range of products and services includes bars and investment coins for both investment and collector purposes, as well as storage options such as accounts, safes, and precious metal savings plans. There are also numismatic coins available for collectors. The bars are sourced from LBMA-certified manufacturers, which allows for higher resale prices. philoro serves banks and private clients as a full-service provider and also sells so-called green gold, which comes from a sustainable value chain and is free from child labour and significant environmental pollution.

Since 2023, philoro has been active in gold production at the philoro Goldwerk located in Korneuburg. The facility is able to recycle precious metals, thereby minimising the ecological footprint. Up to 120 tonnes of gold and 140 tonnes of silver are expected to be produced annually.
