= Dependeq =

Austrian company

- Founded: 1999
- Founder: Horst Krenn
- Headquarters: Vienna, Austria

Dependeq Industrial Plant Engineering GmbH was an Austrian company, headquartered inside Palais Fanto at Schwarzenbergplatz, Vienna with activities in the fields of process engineering and industrial plant supply for the chemical and metallurgical industry. Dependeq products and technologies included hydrochloric acid regeneration plants, pickling lines for carbon and stainless steel as well as environmental technology and process automation.

== Founding History ==
The company was started in 1999 by Austrian entrepreneurs Horst Krenn (14.8.1972) and Herbert Weissenbaeck (1.1.1976). It quickly established itself as one of the key players in its respective international markets. Both Krenn and Weissenbaeck had worked in senior executive positions at another industrial machinery company (S.A.D. GmbH) before.

== Acquisition by SMS group ==
Dependeq was acquired by Düsseldorf, Germany based SMS group of companies and integrated into the SMS Siemag steel making and rolling mills conglomerate by February 23, 2006. Since May 2006 the company operates under the name SMS Siemag Process Technologies GmbH as a center of competence for process plant applications inside the Strip Processing Lines division of SMS Siemag AG. Messrs Krenn and Weissenbaeck still hold a minority share of 24,5% each and continue serving as managing directors of the company.

== Root of Company Name ==
The artificial word "dependeq" is said to have been created by Herbert Weissenbaeck after incidentally reading Jeffrey Robinson's book "The Manipulators" while waiting for a delayed plane at London Heathrow Airport and studying the roots of other carefully crafted company names like "Sony" or "Compaq". It simply stands for "dependable equipment".
