= Hainzl Industriesysteme GmbH =

- Type: Limited liability company (Gesellschaft mit beschränkter Haftung)
- Industry: Industrial Automation, Machine and plant construction
- Founded: 1965
- Headquarters: Linz, Upper Austria, Austria
- Revenue: 130 Mio. € (2014)
- Number of employees: 730 (2014)
- Website: www.hainzl.at

Hainzl Industriesysteme GmbH is an Austrian company situated in Linz, Upper Austria. The system provider in the fields of fluid and drive technology, handling and automation technology, and building technology is mainly active in the business areas of mechanical engineering, plant engineering, vehicle construction, the energy industry, and building and infrastructure construction.

== History ==
The company Hainzl & Bauer was established in 1965 in Linz-Urfahr, where the first units were produced on a farm. In 1970, the company moved to its current location at the Linzer Industriezeile. In 1980, the company hired its 100th employee. Five years later, the Hainzl family acquired 100% of the company and rebranded it as HAINZL INDUSTRIAL SYSTEMS. Since then, the office and production area has been successively developed, with the last expansion taking place in 2009. In 1993 the company Kappa Filter Systems was founded in Steyr (Upper Austria) in conjunction with Klaus Kröger for the maintenance of pure air in industry. Also in 1993, HAINZL started with the development of fire-fighting systems with high-pressure water mist, which are offered under the brand “Aquasys”.

In 2014, HAINZL employed 730 people and had a turnover exceeding EUR 130 million.

== Fields of activity ==
Hainzl develops products and services based on:

1. Hydraulics
2. Elektro mechanics
3. Elektronic systems & telematics
4. Machine & plant automation
5. Optimization of machine & plant energy
6. Handling & robotic systems
7. Process & spray technology
8. Building technology
