= Adolf Darbo =

Austrian food company

- Company type: Private
- Industry: Food
- Founded: 1879; 147 years ago
- Headquarters: Stans, Tyrol, Austria
- Website: www.darbo.at

Adolf Darbo AG is an Austrian food company based in Stans. It was founded in 1879.

Darbo produces a range of jam. The company exports products to about 50 countries and offers private-label production services.

== History ==
The company was founded in 1879 by Rudolf Darbo (d'Arbo) in Gorizia, Austria – today Friuli-Venezia Giulia – as a fruit steam distillery. In 1918, the family moved to Stans. There, the Darbo family initially ran an inn. Son Adolf Darbo Sr., after training as a confectioner, worked in the family business and, at the same time, began producing jams and bottling honey. Later, he came up with the idea of offering small portions for the catering industry. After the Second World War, Tyrol increasingly became a holiday region. The demand for jam and honey increased, and Darbo became the number one in jam production. In 1970, Klaus Darbo joined his parents' business. At the end of the 1970s, he took over the management of the company. In addition to supplying the catering industry, he expanded the sales market for Darbo jams and honey to include the food trade.
