= Thomas Streimelweger =

Austrian entrepreneur (born 1959)

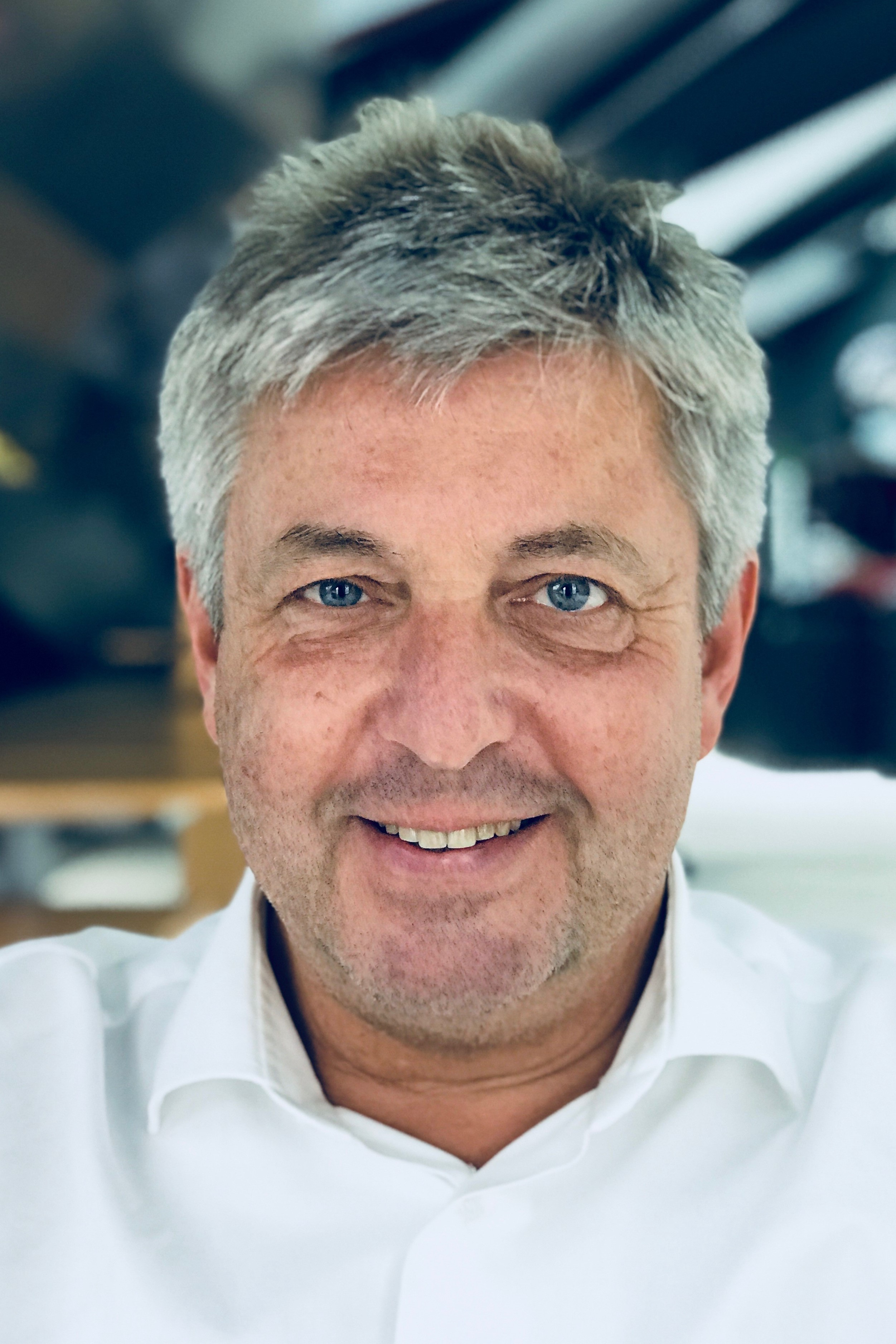
Thomas Streimelweger

Thomas Streimelweger is an Austrian entrepreneur.

Thomas Streimelweger is an Austrian entrepreneur and investor in the software and life science industries. He was the founder and CEO of red-stars.com data AG, a privately held high tech investment and holding company. He founded S&T AG (later merged into Kontron AG), a leading IT-integrator in Eastern Europe, which he took public in 1998 on the EASDAQ/NASDAQ Europe. Streimelweger`s investments are focused on early stage B2B SaaS-businesses in telecom/connectivity management, electronic data interchange, cloud migration and life sciences. He is an entrepreneurial pioneer in longevity and drug development platforms based on human brain and heart organoids derived from iPS cells. All of Streimelweger's companies operate on a fundament of globally leading technologies, proprietary IP and patents. He cooperates and co-invests with VCs, multinational industry partners, family offices and HNWIs.

== Other ventures ==
Prior to the 2008 financial crisis Streimelweger operated a quantitative hedge fund.

== Education ==
Streimelweger holds a college degree in electrical engineering, and he graduated in business administration from the Vienna University of Economics and Business.

== Personal life ==
Streimelweger is married and has 4 children.

== Decorations and honors ==
From 1996 to 2002 Streimelweger served as a diplomat for the Sovereign Military Order of Malta. In 2007 Thomas Streimelweger was awarded the decoration of honor for Services to the Republic of Austria (“Großes Ehrenzeichen für Verdienste um die Republik Österreich“).
