= Best of Biotech =

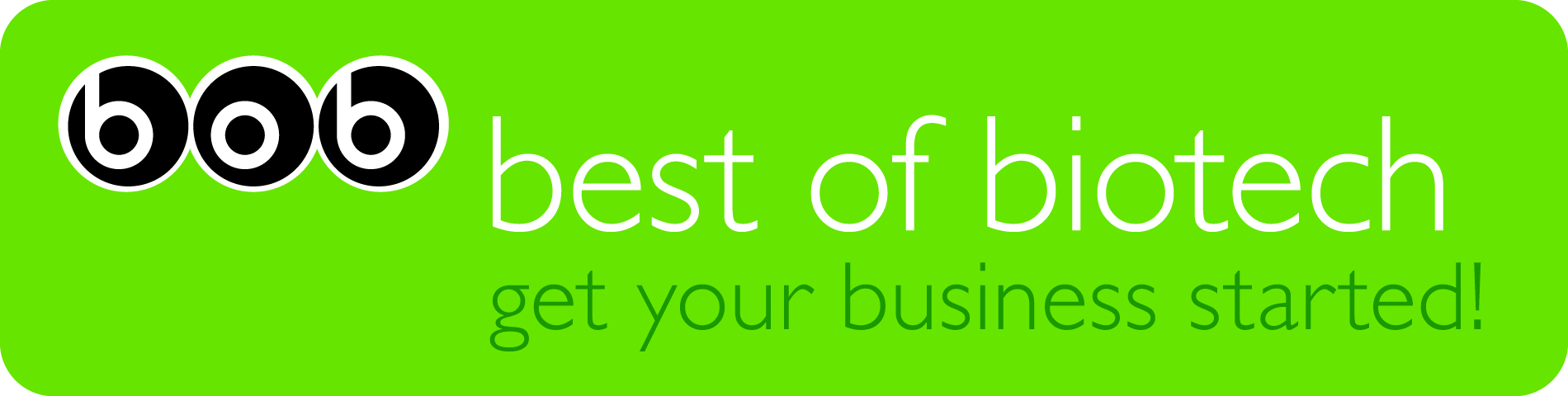
logo BOB

Best of Biotech (BOB) is an international business plan competition with focus on life sciences, i.e. Biotechnology, Medical technology and related fields. The competition is organized every 1–2 years by LISA (Life Science Austria), a program run by Austria Wirtschaftsservice, the Austrian federal development and financing bank, to promote entrepreneurship in the life science sector. The competition is co-sponsored by private life science and healthcare companies and is organized in partnership with international tech transfer agencies and business incubators.

== History ==
Since the first contest in 2000, 211 projects teams have participated, 41 companies have been founded and around €170,000 in prize money has been awarded. Among the companies founded are AYOXXA Biosystems, AVIR Green Hills Biotechnology, Oridis Biomed, Protaffin AG and Ugichem.

== Competition ==
The contest is divided into two phases: In the first phase, participants submit a business idea of which the best three are awarded a cash prize. The second phase includes workshops and coaching sessions, which enable the participants to translate their business ideas into professional business plans. The best three business plans as well as the best medical technology business plan are finally awarded cash prizes. The competition is open to participants from all countries.

The 2010 Jury had the following members: G. Aichinger (Baxter), J. Sarx (Austria Wirtschaftsservice), E. Prieschl-Grassauer (Marinomed), T. von Rüden, M. Fritz (Austria Wirtschaftsservice), M. Müller (MUW), A. Weinländer-Mölders (Caesar & Loretz), R. Hodits (Wellington Partners), M. Jung (Earlybird), A. Fehér (Convincive Consulting), J. Rothe (Life Science Partners), J. Kosch (MIG Fonds)

== Related pages ==
- Tournament In Management and Engineering Skills
- Entrepreneurs' Challenge
