= Wellington Partners =

European venture capital firm

- Industry: Venture capital
- Founded: 1998
- Headquarters: London, Munich, Zürich
- Number of employees: 25+
- Website: www.wellington-partners.com

Wellington Partners is a pan-European venture capital firm with some €800 million under management and offices in London, Munich and Zurich. The firm invests in young companies throughout Europe, mainly in the areas of technology, life sciences and digital media (e.g. interactive TV, gaming, Web 2.0).

== History ==
In 1991, Rolf Dienst founded Wellington Partners after he had built one of the first - and still one of the largest - German venture capital firms, TVM Capital, during the 1980s. In 1998, Wellington Partners closed its first fund, Wellington Partners I. Two years later, the firm closed its second fund on €210 million. After considering suggestions from investors, Wellington Partners initiated its first pure technology fund with €150 million in 2004 and its first life sciences fund in 2006. At the beginning of 2008, the company closed its latest technology fund at €265 million.
