= Pregarten =

- Municipality
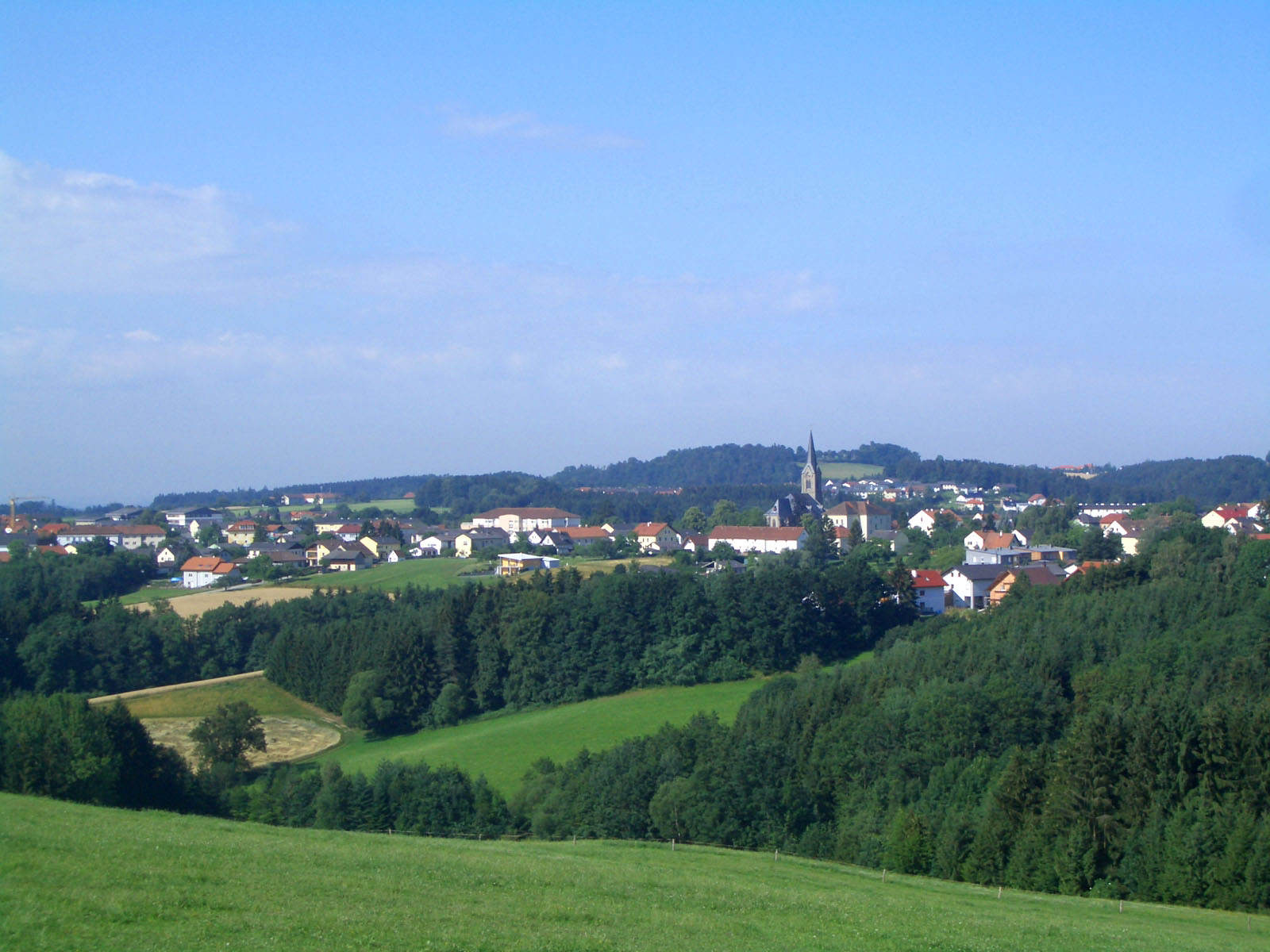

- Coat of arms

- Location of Pregarten within Austria Location of Pregarten within Upper Austria
- Coordinates: 48°21′20″N 14°31′50″E
- Country: Austria
- State: Upper Austria
- District: Freistadt

Government
  - Mayor: Anton Scheuwimmer (ÖVP)

Area
  - Total: 27.8 km^{2} (10.7 sq mi)
- Elevation: 425 m (1,394 ft)

Population (2018-01-01)
  - Total: 5,293
  - Density: 190/km^{2} (493/sq mi)
- Time zone: UTC+1 (CET)
  - Summer (DST): UTC+2 (CEST)
- Postal code: 4230
- Area code: 07236
- Vehicle registration: FR
- Website: www.pregarten.at

Pregarten is a municipality in the district of Freistadt in the Austrian state of Upper Austria.

== Population ==
Historical population
Year	Pop.	±%
1869	2,012	—
1880	2,155	+7.1%
1890	2,180	+1.2%
1900	2,230	+2.3%
1910	2,257	+1.2%
1923	2,174	−3.7%
1934	2,263	+4.1%
1939	2,310	+2.1%
1951	2,576	+11.5%
1961	2,818	+9.4%
1971	3,310	+17.5%
1981	3,809	+15.1%
1991	4,199	+10.2%
2001	4,815	+14.7%
2011	5,001	+3.9%
