= Austria Wirtschaftsservice Gesellschaft =

Austrian financial company

Austria Wirtschaftsservice Gesellschaft (aws)
- Company type: Economic Development Bank
- Industry: Financial services
- Founded: 1954
- Headquarters: Vienna, Austria
- Key people: DI. Bernhard Sagmeister, Mag.a Edeltraud Stiftinger
- Products: Public sector banking
- Number of employees: 250 (2009)
- Website: aws

The Austria Wirtschaftsservice Gesellschaft (aws) is an Austrian federal development and financing bank for the promotion and financing of companies. The bank provides around €1 billion (2008) in development aid, mainly as grants, loans and guarantees to finance projects in the value of almost €11 billion (2008). aws is focused on four different areas: Technology and innovation, equity and capital markets, promotion and financing as well as services for research and development management. In addition to these core activities it also administers the Austrian federal economic stimulus package of around €1 billion in 2009 and 2010. According to the OECD, Austria’s total official development assistance (ODA) (USD 1.9 billion) increased in 2022 due to an increase in in-donor refugee costs. It represented 0.39% of gross national income (GNI).

== History ==
The origins of this bank go back to four different public entities that merged in 2002 into aws: The BÜRGES Förderungsbank was founded in 1954 as a special bank for the support of small and mid-sized companies. In 1962, the ERP-Fonds (European Recovery Program) was set up based on the funds of the Marshall Plan to provide credit for economic development and innovation support. In 1969 the Finanzierungsgarantie Gesellschaft mbH was created in order to reduce the risk for project financing. The fourth organization, the Innovationsagentur, was founded in 1984 to support technology transfer.

== Programs and services ==
Austria Wirtschaftservice supports companies in Austria with grants, loans, guarantees and consulting services in the following areas:

- Promotion schemes for start-up companies.
- Support programs for the growth of established companies, with focus on regional growth, strengthening of competitiveness and job creation.
- Special financing schemes for innovation and technology commercialization, particularly in the deep technology fields IT and communication, green technology, life sciences (Life Science Austria - LISA) and physical sciences, as well as the creative industries (impulse):
  - PreSeed: Financing of preseed projects of up to €200,000 per project (Life Science, IT, Physical Sciences).
  - Seedfinancing: Financing of innovative start-ups of up to €800,000 per project (Life Science, IKT, Physical Sciences).
  - impulse XS, impulse XL, impulse LEAD: Financing schemes for start-ups in the creative industries of up to €300,000 per project.
  - Management auf Zeit (MAZ): Financing of external experts that temporarily provide start-ups with their know-how in finance, marketing or technology.
  - Competitions and awards: Complementary to these financing schemes, innovation stimulating competitions such as "Jugend Innovativ" and the international life science business plan competition Best of Biotech are organized.

== International cooperation ==
The aws cooperates closely with international financing institutions such as EBRD, European Investment Bank, European Investment Fund, IFC and World Bank. It is member of AECM (European Mutual Guarantee Association), EDFI (European Development Finance Institutions) and NEFI (Network of European Financial Institutions for SME).

== See also ==
- List of development aid agencies
- List of banks in Austria
