= Lannach =

- Municipality
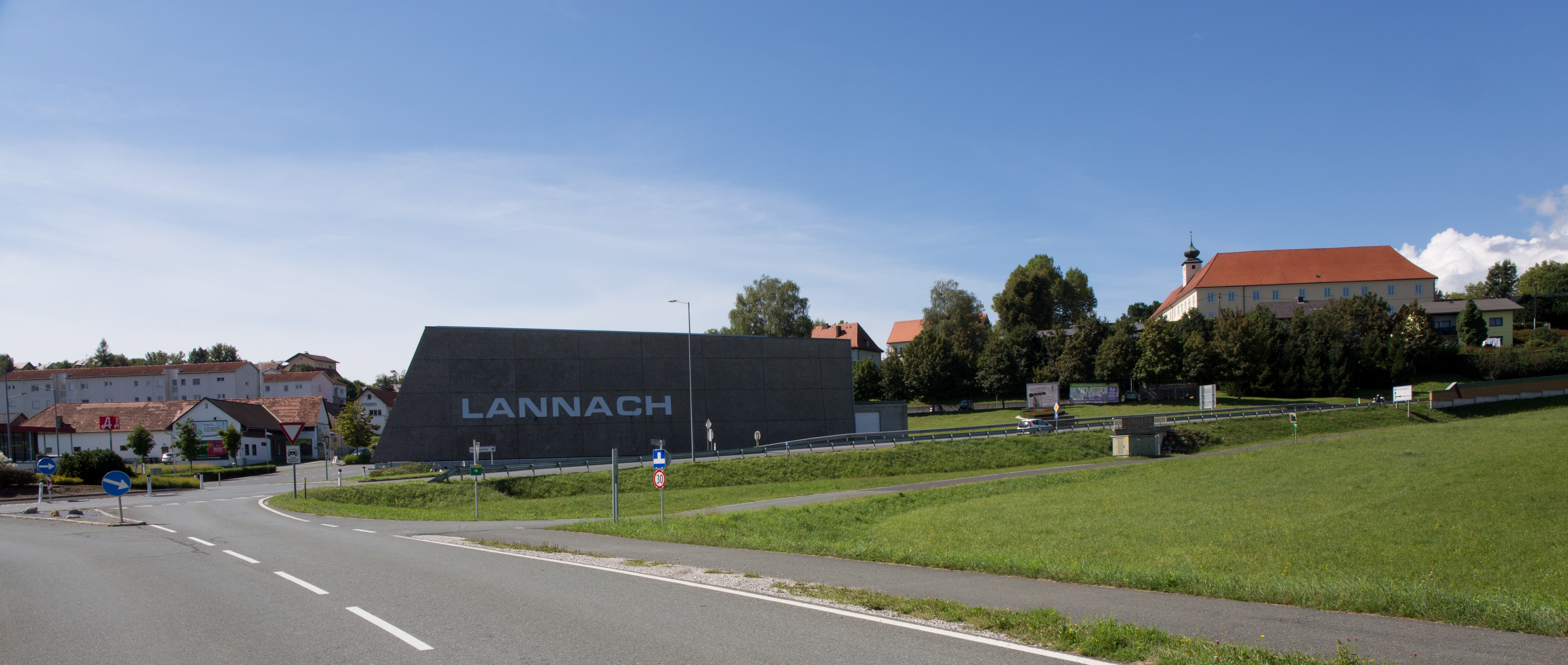

- Coat of arms

- Location within Austria
- Coordinates: 46°57′00″N 15°20′00″E
- Country: Austria
- State: Styria
- District: Deutschlandsberg

Government
  - Mayor: Josef Niggas (ÖVP)

Area
  - Total: 19.84 km^{2} (7.66 sq mi)
- Elevation: 349 m (1,145 ft)

Population (2018-01-01)
  - Total: 3,459
  - Density: 174.3/km^{2} (451.6/sq mi)
- Time zone: UTC+1 (CET)
  - Summer (DST): UTC+2 (CEST)
- Postal code: 8502
- Area code: 03136
- Vehicle registration: DL
- Website: www.lannach.at

Lannach is a municipality in the district of Deutschlandsberg in the Austrian state of Styria.

== Etymology ==
The name "Lannach" is associated with the former landlords, the Lunnachers (Lannachers), whose name derives from a tributary of the Kainach, the Laan (or Lahn); the "u" is a misunderstood reading for an "open" a written not completely closed at the top of an old document. The name is mentioned as Lunach in 1172. According to recent research, the place name Lannach belongs to the type of the Slavic names of the inhabitants, which were borrowed into the German locative, i.e. from Slavic (pri) lunjach "(at the inhabitants of) Lunje". The name itself is testified 1172 as Lunach, 1245 Leunach, 1319 Laenach, 1414 Lanach and means "place, where birds of prey occur" (to Slovenian. lunj "bird of prey, bird of prey etc."). The name of the municipality is pronounced in everyday life with accentuated long a (about: [l'ɑnaχ]). Historical names of the small brook (Laan, Lahn), where the place lies, and the old writing variant Lanach (see the historical maps below) are evidence that the doubling of the n in the name Lannach is no evidence for a vowel shortening.
