= Economy of Austria =

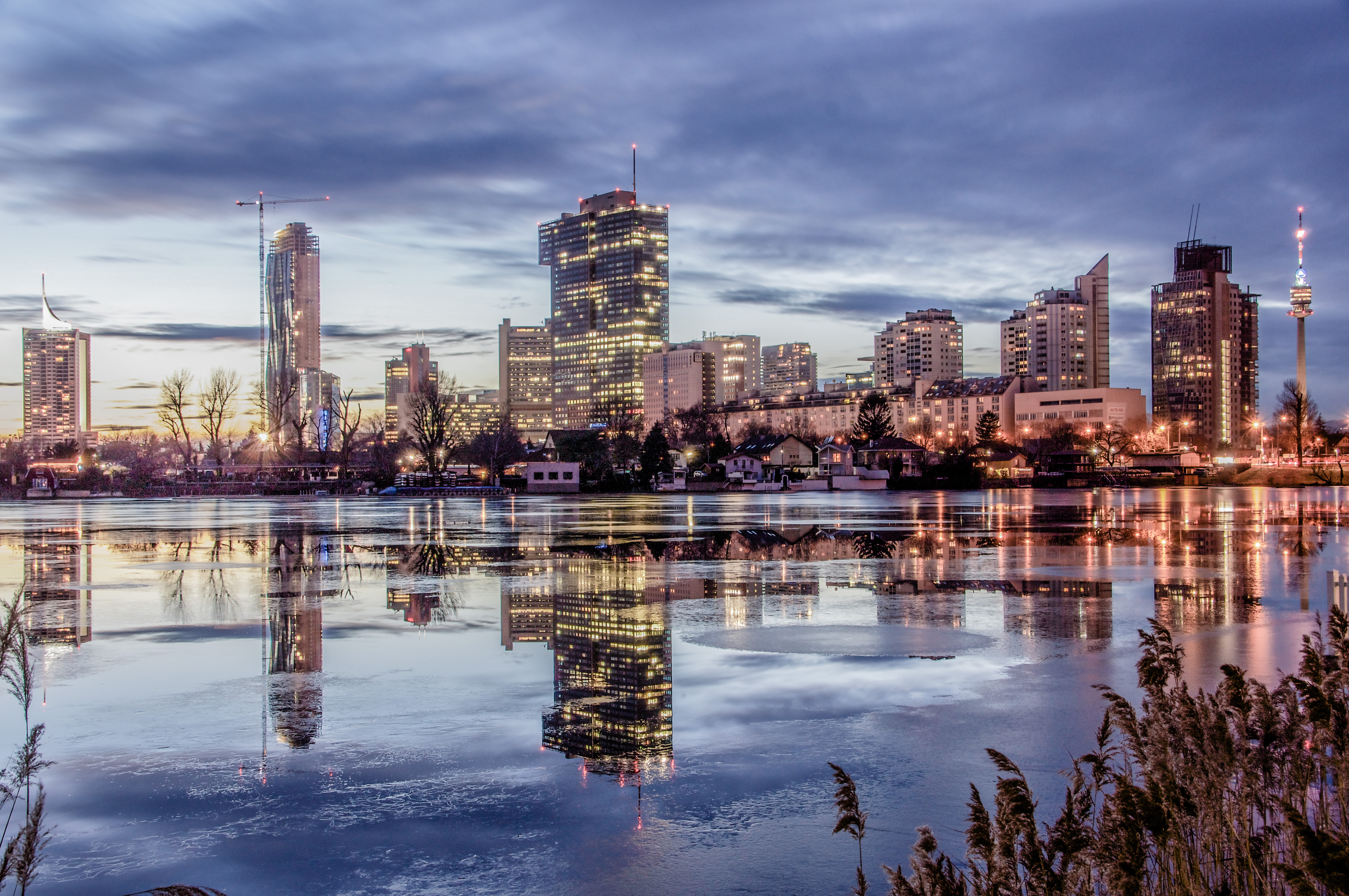
- Danube City, Vienna
- Currency: Euro (EUR, €)
- Fiscal year: Calendar year
- Trade organisations: EU, WTO, OECD
- Country group: Advanced economy; High-income economy

Statistics
- Population: ▲9,179,693 (2024)
- GDP: ▲$559.22 billion (nominal, 2025); ▲$686.44 billion (PPP, 2025)
- GDP rank: 27th (nominal, 2024); 44th (PPP, 2024)
- GDP growth: 0.4% (2024)
- GDP per capita: ▲$61,080 (nominal, 2025); ▲$74,981 (PPP, 2025)
- GDP per capita rank: 13th (nominal, 2025); 18th (PPP, 2025)
- GDP per capita growth: -1.2% (2024)
- GDP by sector: Agriculture: 1.3%; Industry: 28.4%; Services: 70.3%; (2017 est.)
- Inflation (CPI): 7.7% (2023); 3.9% (2024)
- Population below national poverty line: 17.7% at risk of poverty or social exclusion (AROPE 2023)
- Gini coefficient: 0.281 low (2023)
- Human Development Index: 0.926 very high (2022) (22nd); 0.859 very high IHDI (2022, (15th))
- Corruption Perceptions Index: 71 out of 100 points (2023) (20th)
- Labour force: 4,559,603 (2019); 77.2% employment rate (2023)
- Labour force by occupation: Agriculture: 0.7%; Industry: 25.2%; Services: 74.1%; (2017 est.)
- Unemployment: ▲5.7% (2025); ▲11.5% youth unemployment rate (15 to 24 year-olds; 2025)
- Average gross salary: €5,142 monthly (2024)
- Average net salary: €3,479 monthly (2024)
- Main industries: Construction, machinery, vehicles and parts, food, metals, chemicals, lumber and paper, electronics, tourism

External
- Exports: $156.7 billion (2017 est.)
- Export goods: Machinery and equipment, motor vehicles and parts, manufactured goods, chemicals, iron and steel, foodstuffs
- Main export partners: Germany 29.4%; United States 6.3%; Italy 6.2%; Switzerland 5.1%; France 4.8%; Hungary 4.8%; (2017)
- Imports: $158.1 billion (2017 est.)
- Import goods: Machinery and equipment, motor vehicles, chemicals, metal goods, oil and oil products, natural gas; foodstuffs
- Main import partners: Germany 41.8%; Italy 5.8%; Switzerland 5.5%; Czech Republic 4.4%; Netherlands 4.2%; (2017)
- FDI stock: $294.1 billion (31 December 2017 est.); Abroad: $339.7 billion (31 December 2017 est.)
- Current account: $7.859 billion (2017 est.)
- Gross external debt: $630.8 billion (31 December 2017)

Public finance
- Government debt: 70.4% of GDP (2019); €280.426 billion (2019)
- Foreign reserves: $21.57 billion (31 December 2017 est.)
- Budget balance: €2.9 billion surplus (2019); +0.7% of GDP (2019)
- Revenue: 49.0% of GDP (2019)
- Spending: 48.2% of GDP (2019)
- Economic aid: €1.47 billion from European Structural and Investment Funds (2007–2013); €4.92 billion from European Structural and Investment Funds (2014–2020)
- Credit rating: Scope: AA+; Outlook: Negative
- All values, unless otherwise stated, are in US dollars.

Austria has a highly developed social market economy, with the country being one of the 28 richest in the world in terms of GDP (gross domestic product) per capita. Until the 1980s, many of its largest industry firms were nationalised. In recent years, privatisation has reduced state holdings to a level comparable to other European economies. Among OECD nations, Austria has a highly efficient and strong social security system; social expenditure stood at roughly 29.4% of GDP.

Labor movements are particularly strong in Austria, and they have a large influence on labor politics. Next to a highly developed industry, international tourism is the most important part of the national economy. The economy of Austria's average GDP is 13th growth in OECD countries, from 1992 to 2017. In Austria, 1.37% over average population growth is the strong factor.

Germany has historically been the main trading partner of Austria, making the Austrian economy vulnerable to rapid changes in the German economy. However, since Austria became a member state of the European Union, it has gained closer ties to other European Union economies. This development reduced its economic dependence on Germany. In addition, Austria's membership in the EU has drawn an influx of foreign investors.

They were attracted by Austria's access to the European Single Market and the country's proximity to the aspiring economies of the European Union. Growth in GDP has accelerated in recent years, and reached 3.3% in 2006.

In 2024 Austria has a very high, $58,669 nominal GDP per capita ranked 13th.

Vienna was ranked the fifth richest NUTS-2 region within Europe (see Economy of the European Union), with its GDP reaching €38,632 per capita. It was trailing behind Inner London, Luxembourg, the Brussels-Capital Region and Hamburg.

Growth had been steady between 2002 and 2006, varying between 1 and 3.3%. After hitting 0% in 2013, growth had picked up a little. As of 2016, growth was set at 1.5%.

== History ==
=== Foundation and Interbellum ===
First Austrian Republic, founded as a result of the dissolution of Austria-Hungary, inherited an economy battered by the ravages of the First World War, namely:

- The abolition of the gold standard in 1914.
- Provision by the central bank of credit to the state, increasing the money supply.
- The balance-of-payments deficit caused by the Austrian need to import food and fuel, devaluing the krone (the Austrian currency at the time).
- The use of deficit spending to finance food subsidies, leading to a 12-fold increase of banknotes in circulation.

A number of international relief schemes failed to garner enough support while a report by Sir William Goode argued that the Austrian economy would collapse without swift foreign intervention. As such, the Austrian economic crisis stretched into its second year, with inflation running at 99%.

==== League of Nations Bailout ====
With annual inflation running at 2,877%, the League of Nations was officially appointed to organise an Austrian reconstruction plan in August 1922. The League scheme was based on the view that Austrian troubles as a result of an inability to pay for necessities and obtain credit, and therefore, an Austrian financial revival was critical to Austrian survival. To this end, the plan was focused solely on financial reconstruction. Austria would receive loans raised from international money markets and the Austrian public, which would be secured on customs and tobacco taxes. In exchange, Austria would in effect lose sovereignty over its economy, agreeing to:

- Relinquish control over the mints to an independent bank, with the aim of returning to the gold standard.
- Terminate the printing of money by the central bank.
- Eliminate the budget deficit (requiring the implementation of austerity measures and monetary control).

The measures took effect in 1923. Short-term effects were impressive; during the announcement to undertake Austrian reconstruction in August 1922, public confidence soared. Foreign currency holdings were converted back into krone, stabilising the currency. This allowed the Austrian Foreign Exchange Agency to finally intervene to fix the krone to the dollar, something that the wild gyrations of the past had not permitted. Capital rushed back into Austria, and domestic prices stabilised, pronouncing the end of hyperinflation.

The steam ran out shortly after implementation. Growth averaged 0.35% per annum until 1929, unemployment leapt five-fold, bankruptcies increased 41-fold, and the trade deficit doubled.

=== Anschluss ===
Austria was annexed by Nazi Germany in 1938, and consequently lost control of its own economic policy until the formation of the Second Republic in 1945.

=== Post World War II ===
Ever since the end of the World War II, Austria has achieved sustained economic growth. In the soaring 1950s, the rebuilding efforts for Austria lead to an average annual growth rate of more than 5% in real terms and averaged about four-point five percent through most of the 1960s. Following moderate real GDP growth of 1.7%, 2% and 1.2%, respectively, in 1995, 1996, and 1997, the economy rebounded and with real GDP expansion of 2.9 percent in 1998 and 2.2% in 1999.

Austria became a member of the EU on 1 January 1995. Membership brought economic benefits and challenges and has drawn an influx of foreign investors attracted by Austria's access to the single European market. Austria also has made progress in generally increasing its international competitiveness. As a member of the economic and monetary union of the European Union (EMU), Austria's economy is closely integrated with other EU member countries, especially with Germany. On 1 January 1999, Austria introduced the new Euro currency for accounting purposes. In January 2002, Euro notes and coins were introduced, replacing those of the Austrian schilling.

== Currency ==
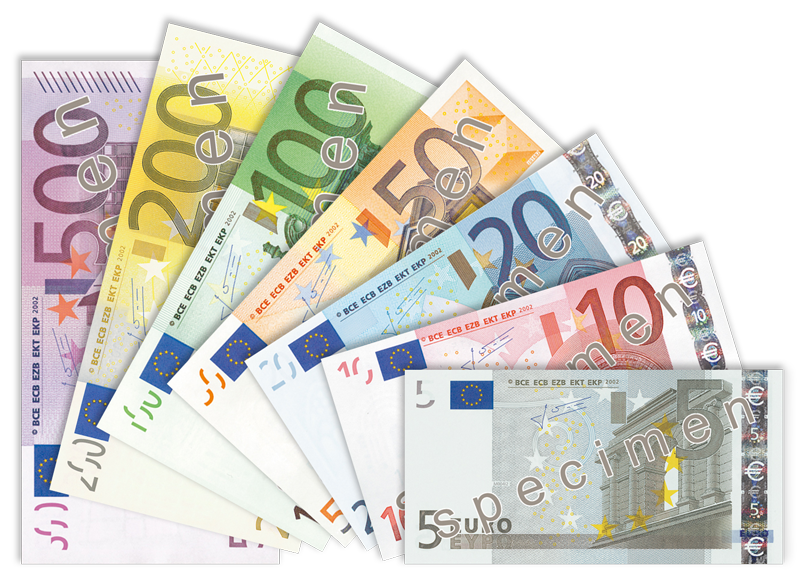
In 1999, Austria introduced the single European currency, the euro. With 18 other EU member states it forms the eurozone.

In Austria, Euros appear as 1999, however all Austrian euro coins introduced in 2002 have this year on it; unlike other countries of the eurozone where mint year is minted in the coin. Eight different designs, one per face value, were selected for the Austrian coins. In 2007, in order to adopt the new common map like the rest of the eurozone countries, Austria changed the common side of its coins.

Before adopting the Euro in 2002 Austria had maintained use of the Austrian schilling which was first established in December 1924. The Schilling was abolished in the wake of the Anschluss in 1938 and has been reintroduced after the end of the World War II in November 1945.

Austria has one of the richest collection of collectors' coins in the eurozone, with face value ranging from 10 to 100 euro (although a 100,000 euro coin was exceptionally minted in 2004). These coins are a legacy of an old national practice of minting of silver and gold coins. Unlike normal issues, these coins are not legal tender in all the eurozone. For instance, a €5 Austrian commemorative coin cannot be used in any other country.

== Privatisation, state participation and labour movements ==
Many of the country's largest firms were nationalised in the early post-war period to protect them from Soviet takeover as war reparations. For many years, the government and its state-owned industries conglomerate played a very important role in the Austrian economy. However, starting in the early 1990s, the group was broken apart, state-owned firms started to operate largely as private businesses, and a great number of these firms were wholly or partially privatised. The government still operates some firms, state monopolies, utilities, and services. Due to the 2008 financial crisis, two banks were nationalised. Since 2019 the Österreichische Industrieholding (ÖBAG) administers the investments of the Republic of Austria in partially or entirely nationalized companies, but came under strong criticism after leaked messages showed how Thomas Schmidt had a say in the appointment of the supervisory board and became sole director. Austria enjoys well-developed industry, banking, transportation, services, and commercial facilities.

Austria has a strong labour movement. The Austrian Trade Union Federation (ÖGB) comprises constituent unions with a total membership of about 1.5 million—more than half the country's wage and salary earners. Since 1945, the ÖGB has pursued a moderate, consensus-oriented wage policy, cooperating with industry, agriculture, and the government on a broad range of social and economic issues in what is known as Austria's "social partnership". The ÖGB has often opposed the Schüssel government's programme for budget consolidation, social reform, and improving the business climate, and indications are rising that Austria's peaceful social climate could become more confrontational.

== Sectors ==
=== Agriculture ===
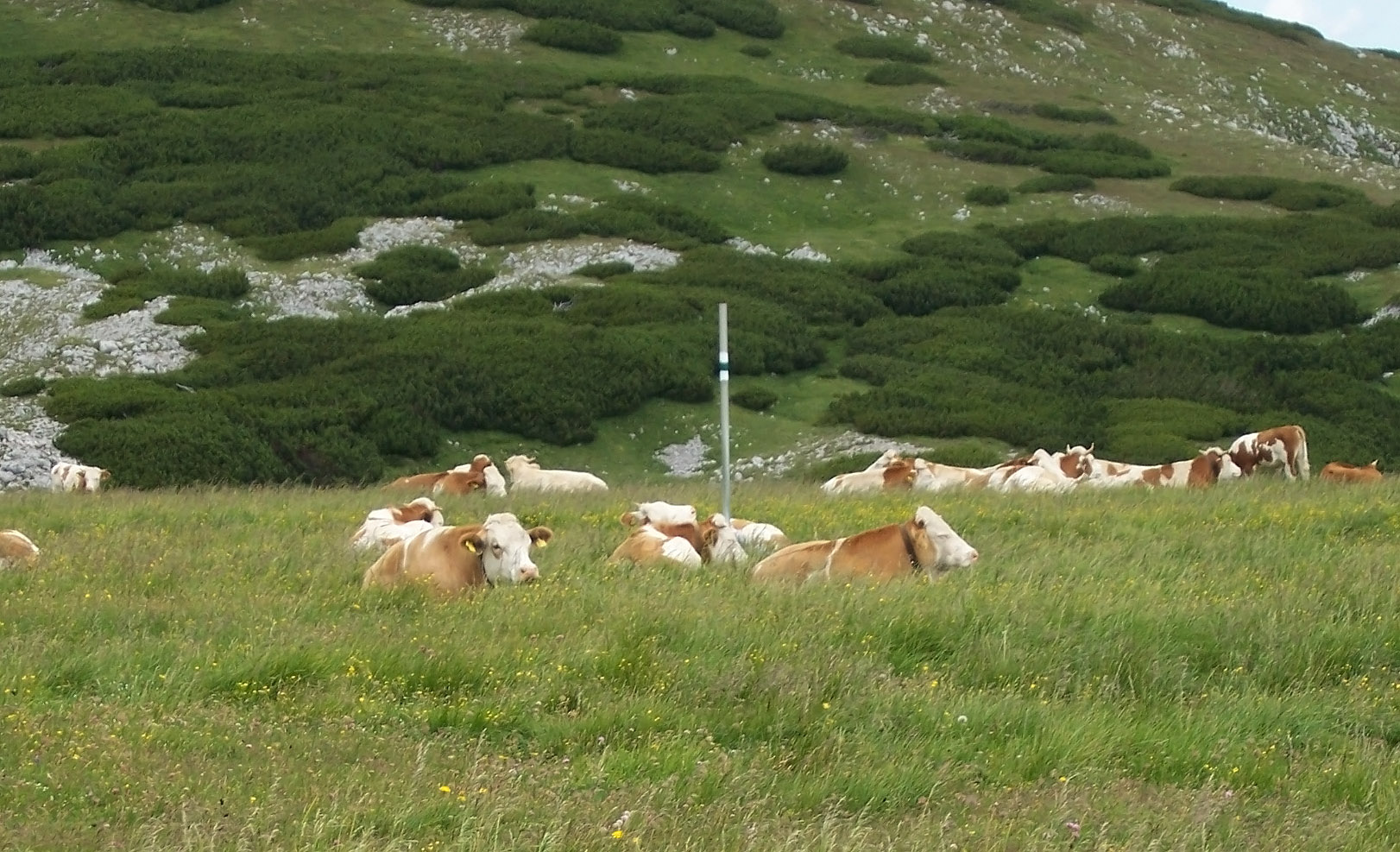
Cows near top of mountain Schneeberg

Austrian farms, like those of other west European mountainous countries, are small and fragmented, and production is relatively expensive. Since Austria's becoming a member of the EU in 1995, the Austrian agricultural sector has been undergoing substantial reform under the EU's Common Agricultural Policy (CAP). Although Austrian farmers provide about 80% of domestic food requirements, the agricultural contribution to gross domestic product (GDP) has declined since 1950 to less than 3%.

Austria produced in 2018:

- 2.3 million tons of sugar beet (the beet is used to manufacture sugar and ethanol);
- 2.1 million tons of maize;
- 1.3 million tons of wheat;
- 697 thousand tons of potato;
- 695 thousand tons of barley;
- 387 thousand tons of apple;
- 367 thousand tons of grape;
- 278 thousand tons of triticale;
- 184 thousand tons of soybean;
- 177 thousand tons of rye (12th largest world producer);
- 132 thousand tons of onion;
- 120 thousand tons of rapeseed;
- 111 thousand tons of pear;

In addition to smaller productions of other agricultural products.

=== Energy ===
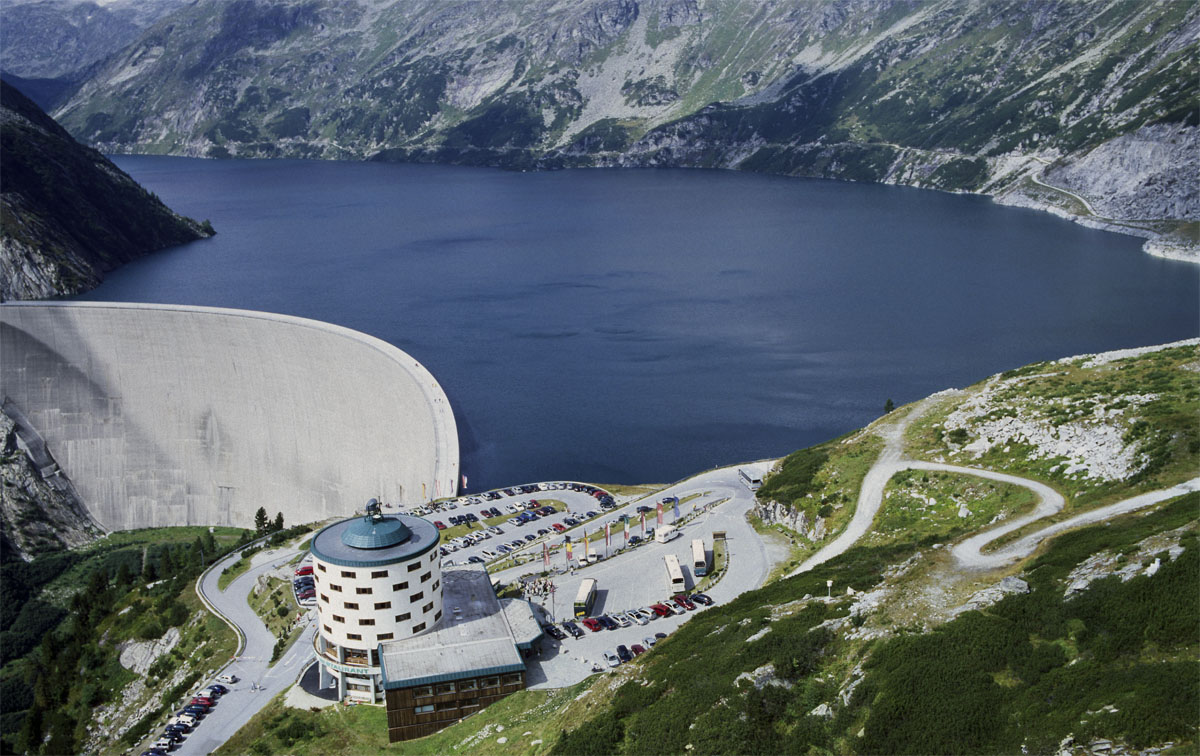
The Kölnbrein Dam in Carinthia

Energy in Austria describes energy and electricity production, consumption and import in Austria. Austria is very reliant on hydro as an energy source, supported by imported oil and natural gas supplies. It is planned by 2030 to become 100% electricity supplied by renewable sources, primarily hydro, wind and solar.

=== Industries ===
Although some industries are global competitors, such as several iron and steel works, chemical plants and oil corporations that are large industrial enterprises employing thousands of people, most industrial and commercial enterprises in Austria are relatively small on an international scale.

==== Mining ====
Austria's mining industry focuses heavily on industrial minerals, construction aggregates, and specialized metals such as tungsten. Erzberg mine is the largest iron ore deposit in Austria, having estimated reserves of 235 million tonnes of ore.

=== Services ===
Most important for Austria is the service sector generating the vast majority of Austria's GDP. Vienna has grown into a finance and consulting metropole and has established itself as the door to the East within the last decades. Viennese law firms and banks are among the leading corporations in business with the new EU member states.

==== Banking and finance ====
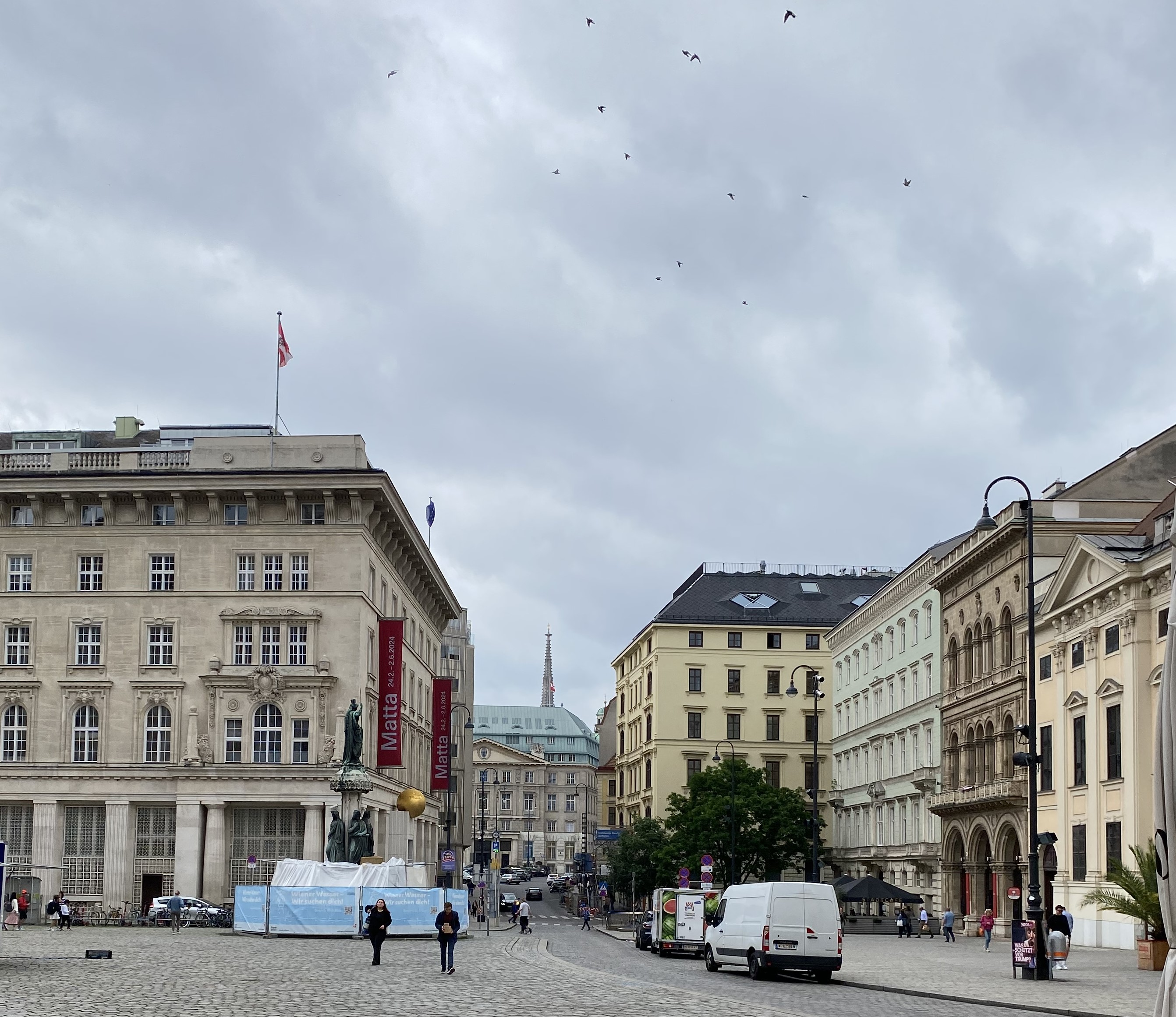
View of the Freyung towards Am Hof in Vienna, with, from left to right, the former head offices of Creditanstalt, Niederösterreichische Escompte-Gesellschaft (later Länderbank, in the background), Anglo-Austrian Bank, and Austro-Hungarian Bank

The banking system in Austria plays a pivotal role in the country's economy, ensuring financial stability and providing essential services to both individuals and businesses. The Austrian banking system is characterized by a three-tier structure, consisting of joint-stock banks, savings banks (Sparkassen), and cooperative banks (Raiffeisenbanken and Volksbanken).

The central bank, Oesterreichische Nationalbank (OeNB), is responsible for the country's monetary policy and the supervision of the banking sector. The Financial Market Authority (FMA) is the primary regulatory body for the Austrian financial market, including banks, insurance companies, and other financial institutions.

==== Education ====
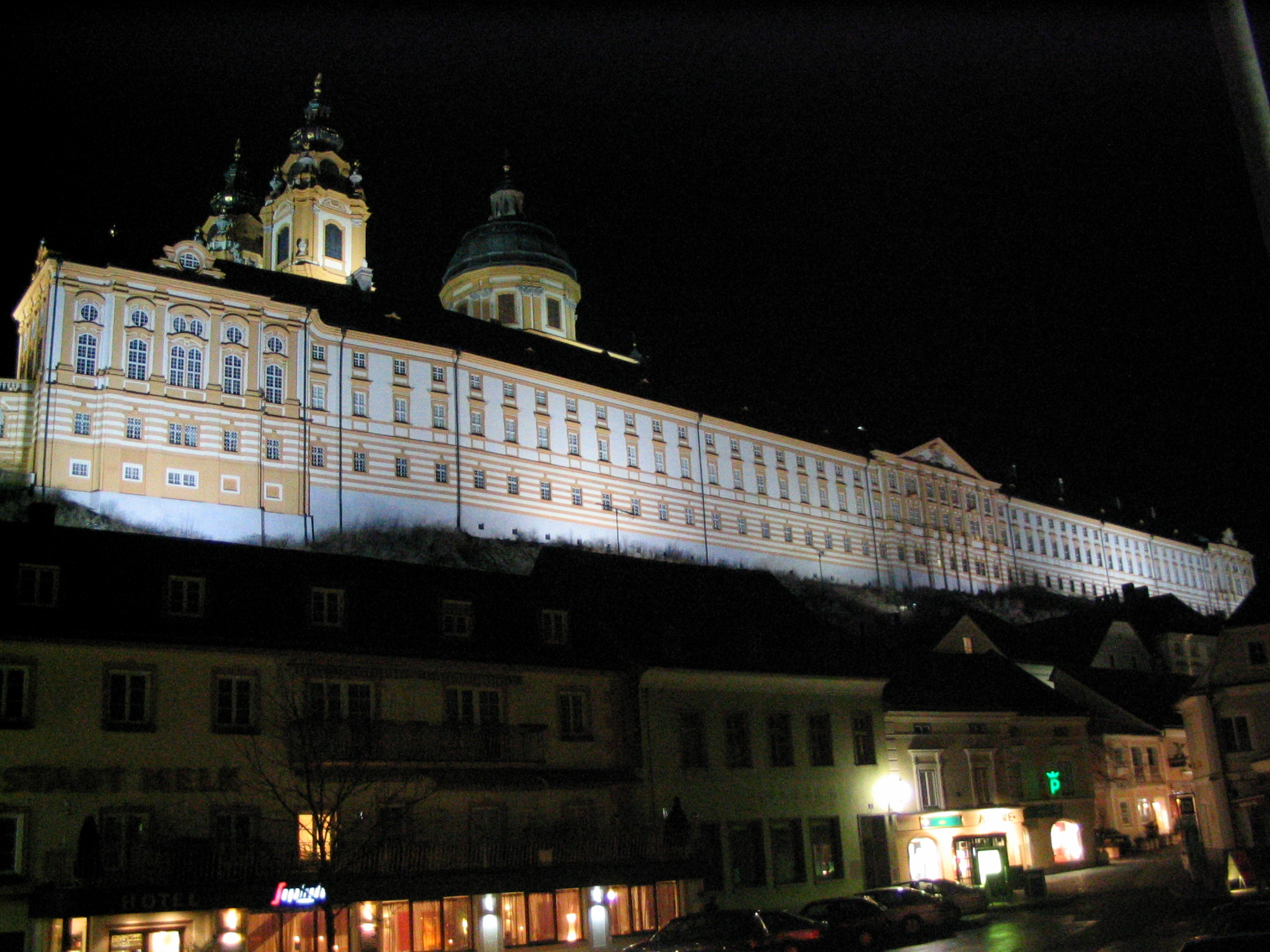
Stiftsgymnasium Melk, oldest Austrian school

Education in Austria is characterized by a free and public school system, with nine years of compulsory education. Beyond this, students can choose from various vocational, technical, and university-preparatory tracks that typically require one to four additional years of study. The legal framework for primary and secondary education is outlined in the School Act of 1962.

The Federal Ministry of Education oversees funding and supervision of primary, secondary, and, since 2000, tertiary education. While education policy is set at the federal level, primary and secondary schools are administered by the respective state authorities.

Federal laws governing education hold significant importance and are treated almost like constitutional laws. They can only be passed or amended by a two-thirds majority in parliament, ensuring stability and continuity in the educational system.

==== Healthcare ====
Austrian health care spending for 1970 to 2007 compared with other nations

Austria's health care system was developed alongside other social welfare programmes by the social democrats in Vienna initially.

==== Telecommunications ====
Telecommunications in Austria refers to communication using Internet and telephone networks, coupled with radio and television broadcast stations. 69% of Small and Medium-sized Enterprises (SMEs) have basic level of digital intensity.

==== Tourism ====
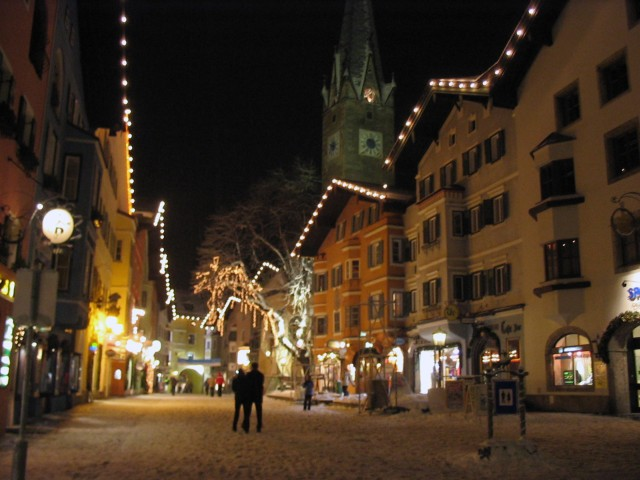
Kitzbühel, one of Austria's famous winter tourist cities

Tourism is very important for Austria's economy, accounting for around 10 percent of Austria's GDP. In 2001, Austria was the tenth most visited country in the world with over 18.2 million tourists. Previously, dependency on German guests made this sector of the Austrian economy very dependent on German economy. However recent developments have brought a change, especially since winter ski resorts such as Arlberg or Kitzbühel are now more and more frequented by Eastern Europeans, Russians and Americans.

==== Transport ====
A map of the Austrian Autobahn and Schnellstraße system.

Austria has a highly developed and efficient transport system that includes road, rail, air, and water networks. The country’s rail system is extensive and reliable. High-speed trains connect major cities like Vienna, Salzburg, and Innsbruck, while regional trains serve smaller towns. International train services link Austria with neighboring countries, including Germany, Switzerland, Italy, and Hungary, making rail travel a convenient option for both domestic and cross-border journeys.

Austria is also highly developed with well-maintained highways (Autobahns) and roads connecting all parts of the country. Driving is common, supported by strict traffic regulations and a toll system on major highways. Public buses and long-distance coaches provide additional options, especially for rural areas that are less accessible by train.

Urban transport is particularly efficient in Austrian cities. Vienna, Graz, and Linz, for example, have extensive networks of metros (U-Bahn), trams, buses, and suburban trains (S-Bahn), offering residents and visitors reliable and punctual public transport. Vienna is especially known for its comprehensive and user-friendly public transport system, which is widely used across the city.

Air transport connects Austria to the rest of the world, with Vienna International Airport serving as the main hub. While water transport is less significant, the Danube River allows for some passenger and freight movement, linking Austria with other Central and Eastern European countries. Cycling has also become increasingly popular, with dedicated bike lanes in cities and scenic routes in rural areas and the Alps, supporting sustainable and recreational travel.

==== Water supply and sanitation ====
Austria has exceptional water supply and sanitation services. Nearly 100% of its drinking water comes from high-quality groundwater and springs, serving roughly 90% of the population via central municipal systems.

== Foreign trade and investments ==
Exports of Austria by product category (2019) Chemical products Transportation Machines Mineral products Plastics and rubbers Metals Foodstuffs Precious metals Textiles Instruments Animal products Vegetable products Paper goods Footwear and headwear Miscellaneous Stone and glass Wood products Animal and vegetable bi-products Animal hides Arts and antiques Weapons

Trade with other EU countries accounts for almost 66% of Austrian imports and exports. Expanding trade and investment in the emerging markets of central and eastern Europe is a major element of Austrian economic activity. Trade with these countries accounts for almost 14% of Austrian imports and exports, and Austrian firms have sizable investments in and continue to move labour-intensive, low-tech production to these countries. Although the big investment boom has waned, Austria still has the potential to attract EU firms seeking convenient access to these developing markets.

== Mergers and acquisitions ==
Companies and investors from Austria are active in mergers and acquisitions (M&A). Since 1991, more than 7,183 mergers & acquisitions transactions have been announced with a known total value of 261.6 bil. EUR. In 2017, over 245 deals with a total value of over 12.9 bil. EUR have taken place. They are not only active in national deals, but also as important investors in cross-border M&A abroad, with Germany being the most important partner. 854 German companies have been acquired by Austrian parent companies (outbound) so far.

The industry with the largest M&A activity in Austria in terms of transaction value has been the financial sector, whereas the industry with the largest number of transactions has been Industrials - representing 19.2%.

== Data ==
The following table shows the main economic indicators in 1980–2024 (with IMF staff estimates in 2025). Inflation under 5% is in green.

Year	GDP (in Bil. US$PPP)	GDP per capita (in US$ PPP)	GDP (in Bil. US$nominal)	GDP per capita (in US$ nominal)	GDP growth (real)	Inflation rate (in %)	Unemployment (in %)	Government debt (in % of GDP)
1980	84.7	11,227.0	80.9	10,732.0	▲2.3%	▲6.3%	1.6%	n/a
1981	▲92.6	▲12,252.3	▼70.1	▼9,280.7	▼-0.1%	▲6.8%	▲2.2%	n/a
1982	▲100.2	▲13,241.0	70.1	▼9,267.7	▲1.9%	▲5.4%	▲3.1%	n/a
1983	▲107.0	▲14,187.1	▲71.0	▲9,417.2	▲2.8%	▲3.3%	▲3.7%	n/a
1984	▲111.2	▲14,746.3	▼67.0	▼8,882.6	▲0.3%	▲5.7%	▲3.8%	n/a
1985	▲117.3	▲15,543.4	▲68.6	▲9,090.8	▲2.2%	▲3.2%	▼3.6%	n/a
1986	▲122.5	▲16,210.5	▲97.4	▲12,886.1	▲2.3%	▲1.7%	▼3.1%	n/a
1987	▲127.6	▲16,868.1	▲121.8	▲16,093.0	▲1.7%	▲1.4%	▲3.8%	n/a
1988	▲133.4	▲17,608.3	▲133.6	▲17,632.8	▲1.0%	▲1.9%	▼2.7%	57.4%
1989	▲144.0	▲18,965.1	▼133.3	▼17,547.8	▲3.9%	▲2.2%	▼2.3%	▼56.3%
1990	▲155.9	▲20,394.2	▲166.9	▲21,827.4	▲4.3%	▲2.8%	▲2.7%	▼55.9%
1991	▲166.7	▲21,622.6	▲174.4	▲22,621.9	▲3.4%	▲3.1%	▲3.2%	▲56.1%
1992	▲174.1	▲22,323.6	▲195.5	▲25,068.4	▲2.1%	▲3.4%	▲3.3%	▼56.0%
1993	▲179.2	▲22,729.4	▼190.4	▼24,152.7	▲0.5%	▲3.2%	▲4.0%	▲60.6%
1994	▲187.4	▲23,634.1	▲204.0	▲25,725.6	▲2.4%	▲2.7%	▼3.9%	▲63.7%
1995	▲196.4	▲24,712.4	▲241.2	▲30,350.5	▲2.7%	▲1.6%	▲4.2%	▲67.9%
1996	▲204.8	▲25,733.6	▼237.3	▼29,820.6	▲2.4%	▲1.8%	▲4.7%	▼67.8%
1997	▲212.7	▲26,695.1	▼213.0	▼26,737.5	▲2.1%	▲1.2%	▲4.8%	▼63.1%
1998	▲222.8	▲27,931.7	▲218.6	▲27,399.1	▲3.6%	▲0.8%	▼4.7%	▲68.8%
1999	▲234.0	▲29,275.7	▼217.5	▼27,210.5	▲3.6%	▲0.5%	▼4.1%	▼61.1%
2000	▲247.4	▲30,875.2	▼197.4	▼24,636.5	▲3.4%	▲2.0%	▼3.9%	▲65.7%
2001	▲256.1	▲31,848.8	▲197.5	▼24,558.9	▲1.3%	▲2.3%	▲4.0%	▲66.4%
2002	▲264.4	▲32,717.3	▲214.2	▲26,508.3	▲1.7%	▲1.7%	▲4.4%	▲67.0%
2003	▲272.2	▲33,527.3	▲262.2	▲32,298.6	▲0.9%	▲1.3%	▲4.8%	▼64.9%
2004	▲287.1	▲35,147.3	▲301.3	▲36,883.9	▲2.7%	▲2.0%	▲5.9%	▼64.8%
2005	▲302.8	▲36,811.3	▲316.3	▲38,450.6	▲2.2%	▲2.1%	▲6.0%	▲68.3%
2006	▲322.9	▲39,055.3	▲336.3	▲40,674.9	▲3.5%	▲1.7%	▼5.6%	▼67.0%
2007	▲344.0	▲41,469.2	▲389.2	▲46,922.6	▲3.7%	▲2.2%	▼5.2%	▼64.7%
2008	▲355.7	▲42,745.9	▲432.0	▲51,914.0	▲1.5%	▲3.2%	▼4.4%	▲68.4%
2009	▼344.5	▼41,301.4	▼401.3	▼48,111.7	▼-3.8%	▲0.4%	▲5.7%	▲79.6%
2010	▲355.1	▲42,466.0	▼392.6	▼46,955.2	▲1.8%	▲1.7%	▼5.2%	▲82.4%
2011	▲373.0	▲44,469.2	▲431.6	▲51,452.3	▲2.9%	▲3.5%	▼4.9%	▼82.2%
2012	▲391.6	▲46,477.7	▼409.7	▼48,616.9	▲0.7%	▲2.6%	▲5.2%	▼81.7%
2013	▲406.4	▲47,936.7	▲430.2	▲50,747.4	▲0.0%	▲2.1%	▲5.4%	▼81.0%
2014	▲417.1	▲48,813.5	▲442.7	▲51,814.4	▲0.7%	▲1.5%	▲6.1%	▲83.8%
2015	▲431.1	▲49,955.5	▼382.0	▼44,267.8	▲1.0%	▲0.8%	▲6.2%	▲84.4%
2016	▲460.2	▲52,659.8	▲395.7	▲45,278.8	▲2.0%	▲1.0%	▲6.5%	▼82.5%
2017	▲479.5	▲54,393.6	▲417.1	▲47,320.5	▲2.3%	▲2.2%	▼5.9%	▼78.6%
2018	▲503.2	▲56,636.7	▲455.4	▲51,254.4	▲2.5%	▲2.1%	▼5.2%	▼74.0%
2019	▲536.0	▲60,498.8	▼443.0	▼50,010.4	▲1.8%	▲1.5%	▼4.8%	▼70.0%
2020	▼521.8	▼58,627.3	▼434.1	▼48,764.2	▼-6.3%	▲1.4%	▲5.5%	▲83.2%
2021	▲569.4	▲63,745.6	▲480.8	▲53,827.4	▲4.8%	▲2.8%	▲6.2%	▼82.4%
2022	▲642.2	▲71,523.9	▼472.3	▼52,609.0	▲5.3%	▲8.6%	▼4.7%	▼78.3%
2023	▲658.9	▲72,370.7	▲512.5	▲56,290.1	▼-1.0%	▲7.7%	▲5.1%	▲78.4%
2024	▲666.9	▲72,818.7	▲521.3	▲56,914.5	▼-1.2%	▲2.9%	▲5.4%	▲81.2%
2025 (prognosed)	▲682.9	▲74,372.0	▲534.3	▲58,191.9	▼-0.3%	▲3.2%	▲5.6%	▲82.9%

=== Companies ===
In 2022, the sector with the highest number of companies registered in Austria is Services with 97,733 companies followed by Finance, Insurance, and Real Estate and Retail Trade with 70,696 and 59,942 companies respectively.

== See also ==
- List of companies of Austria
- List of Austrian states by GDP
- List of Austrians by net worth
- Austrian Business Agency
- Austrian National Bank
- Corruption in Austria
- Federal Ministry of Innovation, Mobility and Infrastructure
- Financial Market Authority (Austria)
- Ministry for Digital and Economic Affairs
- Ministry of Finance (Austria)
- Ministry of Labour (Austria)
- Ministry of Social Affairs, Health, Care and Consumer Protection
- Österreichische Beteiligungs AG
- Pensions in Austria
- Taxation in Austria
- Social market economy
- Economy of European Union
- Economy of Europe
