= A-TEC Industries =

Public company

A-TEC Industries AG was an international industrial holding company based in Vienna, Austria. It belonged to the Austrian industrialist Mirko Kovats. A-TEC was quoted on the Vienna stock exchange from the end of 2006 until February 2014. In 2007, the group of companies accounted for nearly 14.000 employees and had a turnover of more than 2 billion Euro. A-TEC was active in the areas of power plant construction, drive technology, industrial engineering and minerals & metals.

In October 2010, A-TEC went bankrupt and the company's assets were sold off by a trustee over the course of four years. The sell-off was completed by mid-2012. This was the third largest insolvency in Austria. The liquidation process began in October 2018.

== History ==
A-TEC Industries AG has undergone several acquisitions since its founding in 2001, and its history is closely intertwined with that of its founder and director, Mirko Kovats. In 2004, the company changed its name from ATB Beteiligungs GmbH to A-Tec Industries GmbH, and the legal form was changed from a GmbH to an AG. An initial public offering (IPO) was completed in 2006 as part of a capital increase, and the shareholder structure as of December 31, 2006 was documented as follows:

- 55% M.U.S.T. Private Foundation
- 32% free float shares
- 7% J.E. Loidold private foundation
- 6% RPR private foundation

In 2007, Ronny Pecik sold his A-Tec shares, increasing the free shares to 33%.

=== Acquitions ===
Through A-Tec, Kovats frequently engaged in the takeover of economically troubled companies on advantageous terms, after which they underwent restructuring. Notable acquisitions include:

==== Drive technology Division ====
- 2001 ATB Group from the company of the Federal Republic of Austria for industrial policy measures ("ATB Gruppe von der Gesellschaft des Bundes Österreich für industriepolitische Maßnahmen (GBI)"). ATB is a manufacturer of electric motors specialising in motors for domestic and industrial usage. At the time of acquisition by GBI, ATB had approximately 1,200 employees and reported a consolidated revenue of approximately EUR 142 million. GBI sought a buyer with an industrial background and at the time, Kovats had an interest in the machine tool producer Emco.
- 2003 ATB Technologies GmbH, Austria
- 2004 ATB Morley Limited, UK – purchase price EUR 8.3 million.
- 2004 ATB Selni, France – purchase price EUR 3.2 million. Since the value of the assets less the liabilities of this company was higher than the purchase price, A-Tec recorded negative goodwill of EUR 433 thousand.
- 2005 ATB Sever, Serbia – purchase price EUR 4.1 million. After a tender, the A-Tec division ATB acquired the 63% shares in the electric motor manufacturer SEVER held by the Serbian state, the rest remained in free float. With the acquisition, ATB expanded its product portfolio to include motors of large sizes, standard motors and high-voltage motors. Sever had 2000 employees and achieved a turnover of 26 million euros. ATB agreed to assume 7 million euros of debt, finance a social plan and invest 16 million euros.
- 2005/2006 Lindeteves-Jacoberg, Singapore – purchase price EUR 21.8 million. ATB thereby acquired electric motor factories in the UK, Germany, Poland and China, as well as the Schorch, Brook Tamel Crompton and Western Electric brands. As noted in the prospectus, the Lindeteves Group had made a loss since 2003; the company was therefore in need of restructuring. A debt restructuring was carried out.
- 2007 David McClure, UK – purchase price EUR 0.8 million
- 2007 Laurence Scott, UK – purchase price EUR 4.7 million. Laurence Scott is a supplier of electric motors (sales EUR 19.4 million) specializing in the oil and gas industry. Due to cash flow problems, he found himself in bankruptcy proceedings in 2007 despite having enough orders. The takeover was carried out by the British ATB subsidiary Morley.

==== Plant Engineering Division ====
- 2002 Austrian Energy & Environment (AE&E) (Anlagenbau)
- 2003 Von Roll Inova-Gruppe, Switzerland
- 2004 Babcock Power Espana, Spain - purchase price EUR 3.7 million. The Spanish state holding company SEPI purchased the boiler-making company previously owned by Babcock Borsig, which employed 400 people at the Bilbao site. As the value of the assets minus liabilities was higher than the purchase price, A-Tec recorded negative goodwill of EUR 30.6 million. SEPI funded the cleanup with roughly EUR 110 million, of which EUR 12 million was generated in profit. A restructuring provision was also recognized in the 2004 financial statements, which totaled EUR 14.4 million for Babcock Espana.
- 2004 AE&E Chennai Works Ltd. and I.D.E.A. Private Ltd., India - purchase price EUR 6.3 million. The Babcock Borsig Group included two companies: Chennai Works, which specialized in boiler making, and I.D.E.A., which was focused on engineering.
- 2005 Alstom's boiler and power plant business in Asia and the Pacific region: this was merged into Austrian Energy & Environment (Australia) Pty.ltd - purchase price EUR 7.8 million. The French Alstom group was required to divest the Industrial Boilers and Plants division due to EU requirements, with AE&E taking over significant parts of the division. This included four locations across Europe and Australia, with Sydney (Australia) taken over in 2005 and the other locations in Cologne and Nuremberg (Germany) and Brno (Czech Republic) taken over in 2006. At the time, the division employed 450 people and had a sales volume of approximately EUR 400 million. Christian Schmidt, the CEO of AE&E at the time, saw the German locations as complementary to Von Roll's activities, while the Czech and Australian locations were complementary to AE&E Austria.
- 2006 Alstom business in Germany and the Czech Republic - this was incorporated into AE&E Inova (Germany) and AE&E CZ - purchase price EUR 1 million.
- 2007 Global Power Asia/AE&E Nanjing Boiler Co. – purchase price EUR 18.2 million.
- 2007 Lentjes GmbH, Germany from GEA – purchase price EUR 1.2 million. A-Tec acquired Lentjes for an amount of one euro, with additional costs associated with the purchase. Lentjes specializes in the construction of plants for energy production from fossil fuels, biomass, and waste. As part of the agreement, A-Tec was to increase its capital in the range of the low double-digit millions, while the seller was to take on the risks from largely finished projects. Following a detailed evaluation, the EU Commission gave its approval for the acquisition.
- 2008 KRB, Switzerland - purchase price EUR 2 million
- 2008 Mechanical Installations International, UK – purchase price EUR 8 million. A British company specialising in machinery and industrial plant installation, construction, maintenance and servicing, as well as pipe work and steel construction, had 110 employees and a turnover of EUR 21 million in 2007. This company was taken over due to existing orders from AE&E in the area of thermal waste treatment within the United Kingdom.

==== Machine Tool Division ====
- 2004 EMCO, Austria (machine tool construction). EMCO is a mechanical engineering company headquartered in Hallein, Austria, which in 2006 employed 870 people. In 1997 Mirko Kovats acquired a 50% stake in the company, undertaking a restructuring process and investing 120 million shillings (around 9 million euros) of his own money. By 2003, Kovats owned 100% of the company. In 2004, the private foundation M.U.S.T. acquired 25% of the company, and the majority of votes, for a cost of 20 million euros.
- 2006 remaining 75% of EMCO - purchase price EUR 70.3 million
- 2007 Dörries Scharmann Technologie, Germany - purchase price EUR 64.3 million. Dörries Scharmann is a manufacturer of specialised machine tools for automotive, mechanical, and aerospace engineering. AE&E Nanjing Boiler Co., a Chinese company, specialises in the production of industrial and waste heat boilers. With an annual turnover of US$20 million, the company has been identified as a cost-efficient production site by A-Tec.

==== Minerals & Metals Division ====
- 2004 Montanwerke Brixlegg, Austria (Minerals & Metals) – purchase price EUR 9.7 million. The entity is a copper recycling company with a history of more than 500 years.
- 2007 Gindre, France – purchase price EUR 29.5 million. Gindre, a French company located in Lyon, specializes in the production of semi-finished copper products and components for the electrical industry. Established in 2006, the company employed 450 people and generated a revenue of 300 million euros. Its operations spanned five countries, including France, Germany, Great Britain, Spain, and the United States. Through forward integration, Gindre's Minerals & Metals division was further expanded with the Kupferhütte Montanwerke Brixlegg.

==== Other ====
- 2008 Voitsberg steam power plant, Austria - purchase price EUR 35 million

In 2006, the Voitsberg lignite-fired power plant was decommissioned and placed up for auction. A-Tec emerged as the victor among the 49 initial bidders, proposing to repurpose the plant to utilize other energy sources in coordination with AE&E.

==== Failed Takeovers ====
In 2007, A-Tec sought to bolster the copper sector by acquiring the Belgian copper group Cumerio, in contrast to Norddeutsche Affinerie (NA). Although A-Tec also acquired a stake in NA, the German Federal Cartel Office (Bundeskartellamt) barred the takeover of NA, deeming it to create a dominant position in the oxygen-free continuous cast copper shapes market. This series of events was dubbed the "copper thriller" by the media. By early 2008, A-Tec had sold off its Cumerio shares and, by the summer, relinquished its stake in NA.

Later in the year, A-Tec's attempt to purchase Serbian copper smelter RTB Bor fell through due to the company's failure to pay the full purchase price in time. In the same year, A-Tec moved to acquire the Ugandan copper mine Kilembe, as well as a copper smelter in the country.

=== Financial market transactions ===
On November 2, 2005, A-Tec INDUSTRIES AG issued a bond (ISIN AT0000499272) in the amount of EUR 100 million with a 5.75% interest rate, payable upon maturity on November 2, 2010.

The A-Tec share (ISIN AT00000ATEC9) was listed on the Vienna Stock Exchange in December 2006, reaching its highest point of EUR 48 in the summer of 2007. By mid-July 2009, the share had dropped to a value of nearly EUR 9.

A convertible bond (ISIN AT0000A05CS2) with a volume of EUR 180 million was issued on May 3, 2007, with a coupon rate of 2.75%. The bond was due to be repaid in 2014 and included a conversion right, which was valid until April 18, 2014, allowing creditors to convert the bonds into shares at a conversion price of EUR 56.25 per share. In the second half of 2009, A-Tec bought back a portion of the bond, which reduced the outstanding volume to around 92 million euros.

On October 27, 2009, A-Tec Industries issued a convertible bond (ISIN AT0000A0F795) with a nominal value of EUR 110 million and an 8.75% interest rate, maturing in 2014. Creditors were granted the right to convert the bonds into shares of A-Tec stock at a conversion price of EUR 14.76 per share until October 7, 2014.

In June 2010, A-Tec attempted to issue another bond but failed, with no ad hoc announcement informing the public of the failure. As a result, in 2012, the Financial Market Authority fined both Mirko Kovats and Christian Schmidt a total of EUR 130,000.

On October 5, 2010, A-Tec made an ad hoc announcement disclosing major orders with a volume of approximately one billion. However, at the time of the announcement, it had already been reported to the Financial Market Authority that the financing for these orders had not been secured. As a result, in 2012, Mirko Kovats, Christian Schmid and Franz Fehringer were each fined an additional EUR 200,000.

== The insolvency proceedings of A-Tec - Part 1 ==
On 20 October 2010, A-Tec announced the commencement of insolvency proceedings. According to the company itself, the filing of the 'reorganisation proceedings with self-administration' was due to difficulties in connection with the refinancing of a bond and the deterioration of the economic situation of the Australian subsidiary of the AE&E Group. With debts of over 350 million euros as of 2010, it was the third largest bankruptcy in Austrian economic history.

An article in Industrie magazine accuses the executive board of the A-Tec subgroup AE&E of deception through accounting tricks. In addition to the public and banks, Mirko Kovats was also affected.

Share trading on the Wiener Börse was suspended. When trading resumed on 22 October, the share price fell by 65%. The share is no longer traded on the prime market, but only on the standard market continuous.

== Insolvency of the Plant Engineering Division (AE&E Group) ==
As the banks subsequently cut the loans and a sale was also not possible, the A-Tec subsidiary AE&E Group GmbH, the holding company of the AE&E subgroup, had to file for insolvency (restructuring without self-administration) in Vienna on 23 November 2010. The holding company had 50 employees, the AE&E Group had 600 employees throughout Austria and 5,200 employees worldwide. AE&E Group GmbH was closed on 3 December 2010. Shortly afterwards, the proceedings became bankruptcy proceedings, as a result of which A-Tec lost control of the AE&E Group. On 26 November 2010, the operating company AE&E Austria GmbH & Co. KG also had to file for insolvency.

On 3 December, the purchase of AE & E Austria by Andritz AG was confirmed. This was achieved by the newly founded Andritz Energy & Environment GmbH taking over projects and most of the employees as a rescue company.

For AE&E Austria GmbH & Co. KG, a reorganisation plan was adopted in July 2011. According to this plan, non-preferential creditors will receive a quota of 20%. In addition, there is the chance of a super quota from the realisation of the assets handed over to the liquidator, namely, among other things, claims for damages against the company's executive bodies, against A-Tec Industries AG and its executive bodies, against M.U.S.T. Privatstiftung and Loidold Privatstiftung and their companies and executive bodies. The assets also include claims against A-Tec Beteiligungs GmbH in relation to the Voitsberg power plant.

In February 2013, it was planned to pay out a (partial) super quota of 15% to the creditors. In June 2013, the deadline for the monitoring of AE&E Austria GmbH & Co. KG by the trustee was extended to 18 July 2016 and a further extension to 18 July 2019 was granted in July 2016.

The Swiss intermediate holding company AE&E Inova Holding AG had to apply for debt-restructuring moratorium in December 2010, as a loan to AE&E Group GmbH had to be written off.

As a result, other subsidiaries of the AE&E Group were also sold:

- AE&E Von Roll Inova, Switzerland to Hitachi Zosen, Japan
- AE&E KRB AG, to Hitachi Zosen, Japan
- AE&E Inc., USA to Hitachi Zosen, USA
- AE&E Inova France SA, AE&E Maintenance France S.A.S., AE&E Inova France Operations S.A.S. an Altawest SAS
- Đuro Đaković TEP, Croatia to EM Alliance, Russia
- Lentjes, Germany to Doosan, Korea
- AE&E Inova GmbH, Germany, had to file for insolvency in November 2010. The Japanese IHI Corporation acquired the plant and boiler construction division, Keppel Seghers the expertise in waste incineration plants and enpros the engineering division.
- AE&E CZ, s.r.o., Czech Republic went to Bilfinger Berger in 2011
- AE&E Chennai Works Ltd. und I.D.E.A. Private Ltd. an Doosan (Südkorea) und Dodsal (Indien) – Verkaufspreis 20 Millionen EUR
- AE&E Australia also had to file for insolvency and was then sold to RCR Tomlinson. Physical assets, intellectual property and technologies were acquired, but no liabilities for projects that arose before the company was sold.

RCR Tomlinson received a fixed payment of around 2.5 million Australian dollars (AUD). In addition, a performance-related payment of a maximum of AUD 5 million was agreed. RCR Tomlinson recognised a profit of AUD 3.7 million from this acquisition in its 2011 balance sheet.

- The Spanish subsidiary Babcock Power Espana had to file for insolvency in 2011. The Spanish state holding SEPI filed claims for damages for breach of contract against A-Tec, AE&E Group GmbH and AE&E Austria GmbH & Co KG. SEPI received EUR 10.6 million from the AE&E Austria quota in July 2011.
- AE&E Mechanical Installations International Ltd. had to file for insolvency in November 2011.
- AE&E Financial Services GmbH (founded to process payment transactions within the AE&E Group) went into liquidation on 22 February 2012 and was deleted on 15 January 2013 following its termination.

In January 2013, the bankrupt AE&E Group GmbH made an interim distribution of 7%. A further pro rata distribution of 7% was made as at December 2015. A further 3.3% was distributed as at January 2020.

== The insolvency proceedings of A-TEC - Part 2 ==
=== The reorganisation plan ===
At the end of December 2010, the creditors of A-TEC accepted a restructuring plan that was to be finalised by 30 December 2010. An investor had to be found for the A-TEC Group by 30 June 2011, whereby the 47% quota had to be paid by the end of September 2011. In absolute figures, the investor was expecting an investment of 250 million euros.

According to a valuation report, the remaining subgroups ATB, Emco including Dörries Scharmann and Montanwerke Brixlegg were to be valued as follows: ATB at between -7.1 and +15.4 million euros and the others together at between 147 and 212 million euros.

Insolvency proceedings were opened against the holding company of the Dörries Scharmann Group, A-TEC Mechanical Engineering Investment GmbH (AMEI), in mid-December 2010 at the request of two banks.

On 17 January 2011, the German-Swiss Starrag announced the acquisition of the Dörries Scharmann Group. The purchase agreement was concluded on 19 January for an amount of 70 million euros. The insolvency proceedings against AMEI were then terminated. As can be seen from the published 2011 annual financial statements of this company, A-TEC Mechanical Engineering Investment GmbH realised a profit of around EUR 2.8 million from the sale of the investment.

On 15 June 2011, A-TEC CEO Mirko Kovats presented A-TEC's 2010 annual balance sheet with a record loss of EUR 584.5 million.

The annual financial statements of the A-TEC subgroup ATB were also presented in June 2011: ATB reported a net loss for the period of EUR 107 million. The strongly negative result was mainly caused by high amortisation of intangible assets and depreciation of property, plant and equipment, which amounted to 91 million euros (previous year: 2 million euros). ATB was severely affected by the reorganisation process at A-TEC: the loss of confidence among banks, credit insurers, suppliers and customers made financing more difficult. A-TEC came to the aid of ATB to the extent that A-TEC Industries AG and its subsidiary AE&E Energy AG converted loan receivables totalling 80 million including interest into hybrid capital: repayment does not have to be made until the Annual General Meeting of ATB Austria Antriebstechnik AG passes a resolution to this effect. In addition, A-TEC made a shareholder contribution totalling EUR 25 million in December 2010. However, A-TEC's ability to finance ATB has been severely limited since the reorganisation proceedings were initiated.

Loan deferrals were agreed with some banks.

Capital increases were carried out at the ATB subsidiary ATB Sever at the beginning of 2011. The balance sheet reorganisation was completed through the contribution of receivables, capital contributions and debt waivers totalling around EUR 38 million. In April 2011, the loss-making Industrial Motors division of ATB Sever was discontinued, resulting in the loss of 283 jobs.

Towards the end of June 2011, it became known that A-TEC was still negotiating with five interested parties, including the British-French financial investor Astorg, the Indian steel group Essar and the Czech-Slovak investor Penta.

In July 2011, the Vienna public prosecutor's office carried out a house search at A-TEC, as investigations were underway against several members of the management board on the basis of a complaint for fraudulent bankruptcy and balance sheet falsification, among other things.

In the same month, the restructuring administrator's report was also published, in which he stated, among other things, that:

- the Group had grown rapidly through the acquisition of economically weak industrial companies
- the Group had a low equity ratio
- the liquidity planning did not take into account unforeseen events
- USD 93 million was invested in corporate jets and EUR 40 million in the Voitsberg power plant and a plot of land

In September 2011, the plan was to raise the quota of 200 million euros as follows: ATB was to go to the Chinese Wolong Group via Contor Industries GmbH, Minerals & Metals to Solstice International and the Voitsberg power plant to Palmsquare. Emco would have remained with A-TEC. Contor Industries GmbH was founded in June 2011, with former A-TEC employee Thomas Schätti as managing director and sole shareholder. The business address of this company was that of A-Tec Industries AG and the share capital was only EUR 35,000. However, Mirko Kovats denied that it was a shell company. According to the A-TEC Management Board's report, Contor Industries GmbH's role was only to coordinate the bids; the contracts were concluded directly with the individual bidders.

According to the Management Board's report, there were two counter-offers, but these were rejected:

1. Investor Springwater Capital LLC: loan of up to EUR 100 million and a bond of EUR 110 million - here, price stability in the Copper Division was required, which could not be guaranteed.
2. Investor Penta: In this case, a special purpose entity (Vysehrad Holding B.V., Netherlands) would have taken over the entire assets of A-TEC and paid the quota in return. A-Tec would have held a 20% stake in this special purpose entity, but would hardly have been able to receive any returns as the special purpose entity was heavily leveraged: Vysehrad would only have had 20 million euros in equity, and Penta would have lent Vysehrad the additional 190 million euros required at an interest rate of 20%.

In addition, extensive warranties would have had to be assumed.

However, Penta filed a lawsuit against the sale via Contor. As a result, the Pakistani investor behind Solstice, Alshair Fiyaz, withdrew his offer.

=== Realisation by the trustee ===
The sale subsequently fell through and the companies are now being sold individually. Following the failure of the reorganisation and takeover by new investors, the share price fell to EUR 0.84 in October 2011. The Vienna Stock Exchange suspended the share from trading. The trustee, Matthias Schmidt, carries out the realisation of A-TEC's assets.

==== Realisation of the other divisions ====
- On 19 October 2011, the trustee sold the Drive Technology division (ATB Group) to the Chinese Wolong Group, generating proceeds of around EUR 53 million.
- The sale of the EMCO Group to Salzburg-based Kuhn Holding for around EUR 34 million took place on 20 December 2011. In addition, the buyer has a contingent liability of EUR 4 million, of which it is claiming EUR 2.4 million. This means that EUR 1.6 million is still outstanding (as at June 2013).
- The Minerals & Metals division (Montanwerke Brixlegg and Gindre) was sold to Umcor from Switzerland for around EUR 86 million on 10 February 2012. In addition, the buyer has a contingent liability in the amount of EUR 11 million, which he is claiming in full. The trustee has accepted EUR 3 million of this, the remainder is still being negotiated (as at June 2013).

==== Realisation of other assets and investments outside the divisions ====
Assets and investments outside the divisions developed as follows:

- In February 2012, the subsidiary A-Jet, which operated the Group's own jets, had to file for bankruptcy. It thus became one of a series of bankruptcies of Austrian commercial aviation companies, whose other victims included MAIN Aviation Project GmbH & Co Falcon KG, Comtel Air and M.A.P. Management + Planning GmbH.

A-Jet also got into difficulties due to the A-TEC insolvency. Its former managing director Peter Tutschek had also found investors, but it was allegedly not possible to get them on board because Kovats had demanded too high a price. 15 employees had to be made redundant.

According to Tutschek, A-Jet was already insolvent at the end of 2010 and he also wanted to file for insolvency. According to Tutschek, A-Jet was already insolvent at the end of 2010 and he had also wanted to file for insolvency, but Mirko Kovats did not want to jeopardise the restructuring of A-TEC. For this reason, A-Tec CFO Franz Fehringer took over the management of the company in mid-January 2011. In December 2011, the trustee appointed Gert Burgmann as managing director instead of Fehringer. Tutschek argued with A-Jet before the labour court.

Shortly before the insolvency, the Ministry of Transport withdrew the company's flight licence (Air operator's certificate). However, this licence would have been essential for an investor. The background to the licence revocation was that Franz Fehringer, as A-Jet managing director, had not provided the ministry with the relevant information about the financial situation.

According to Kovats, Tutschek's statements were incorrect; Bergmann was to blame for the bankruptcy, as employees had badmouthed A-Jet to the authorities due to unpaid salaries.

It also became known that there had been strange flows of money to Bahrain during the Fehringer era.

The bankruptcy rate of A-Jet is 11.8917%.

- A company jet (leased from A-TEC subsidiary Challenger Anlagenvermietung GmbH) was sold to the US in April 2012 for US$15.5 million. The aircraft in question was a Bombardier Challenger 300, and the lessor received 14.9 million dollars from the proceeds of the sale.
- A bankruptcy petition was filed in May 2012 for i.Dream Media Services GmbH, which also belongs to A-TEC, but this was rejected due to a lack of assets.
- A-TEC's stake in Drum Beteiligungsverwaltungs GmbH, Brunn am Gebirge (1%) was transferred to the majority shareholder, Reinhardt Salusek, in November 2012.
- A-TEC PETRO GmbH, Vienna, was officially deleted from the commercial register in May 2013 due to lack of assets.

90% of this company was owned by E-TEC Beteiligungsverwaltungs GmbH, a subsidiary of A-TEC Industries AG (which acquired it from A-TEC Minerals & Metals Management GmbH, also a subsidiary of A-TEC Industries AG, in November 2011).[81] The remaining 10% belonged to Sergey Ilin,[82] who was also managing director.[83] The legal basis for the cancellation was § 40 of the Commercial Register Act, which stipulates that a company that does not obviously have assets can be cancelled if it does not submit the annual financial statements for two consecutive financial years and the existence of assets is not proven.[84] The company had not published its annual financial statements for 2010 and 2011 until May 2013.[85]

Nevertheless, formal liquidation proceedings were decided in May 2014 and Gert Bergmann was appointed as liquidator. The annual financial statements for 2010, 2011, 2012, 2013 and 2014 have now been submitted.

The company was cancelled again in March 2015, but this time due to the end of liquidation.

- The Voitsberg power plant (owned by A-Tec Beteiligungs GmbH) was sold to Porr Umwelttechnik GmbH in January 2013. Porr demolishes the power plant and recycles the materials (non-ferrous metals, scrap, etc.). Following the dismantling of Blocks I and II, Porr sold Block III to Romanian investors in March 2014. Porr will sell the property once the work has been completed. Porr paid EUR 4 million and expects a substantial profit from the utilisation of the materials. The creditors were left with only a small amount of proceeds, as the conservation costs of the power plant and the claims of the insolvent AE&E Austria GmbH & Co. KG (see above) had to be settled first.
- Also up for sale was the right to lease a property at Vienna Airport. This was a 60-year lease agreement. The A-TEC Group headquarters were to have been built on the site, but this never materialised due to insolvency. In the end, the matter was resolved by Vienna Airport receiving EUR 500,000 from the reorganisation administrator and the contract was thus terminated in July 2013.
- Energy Investment Kraftwerkerrichtung AG was deleted from the commercial register in August 2013 due to lack of assets.

The company was founded in 2009. Mirko Kovats and Christian Schmidt were appointed as members of the management board. Christian Schmidt was now the sole member of the management board after Mirko Kovats was removed from the management board in September 2012. The company has not yet (June 2013) published any annual financial statements. A-TEC Industries AG held a 99.99% stake in this company, while Mirko Kovats held 0.01%. According to the information in the 2012 annual financial statements of A-TEC Industries AG, Energy Investment Kraftwerkerrichtung AG had negative equity of around EUR 3,000 as at 31 December 2012.

- A-Tec Beteiligungs GmbH, Mönchengladbach, Germany, went into liquidation in June 2014. The liquidator is Franz Fehringer. The company's last published balance sheet dates back to 2006 and it was deleted from the commercial register in June 2019.

A merger plan was submitted for this cross-border merger in November 2012, the merger was entered in the commercial register in February 2013 and A-TEC Mechanical Engineering Investment GmbH was deleted from the commercial register in March 2013. According to the last available balance sheet from 2011, the company had assets of around EUR 13.7 million following the sale of its stake in the Dörries Scharmann Group (in January 2011, see above) and the repayment of all debts. There were only provisions totalling around EUR 80,000.
