= Mint Airways =

Spanish charter airline

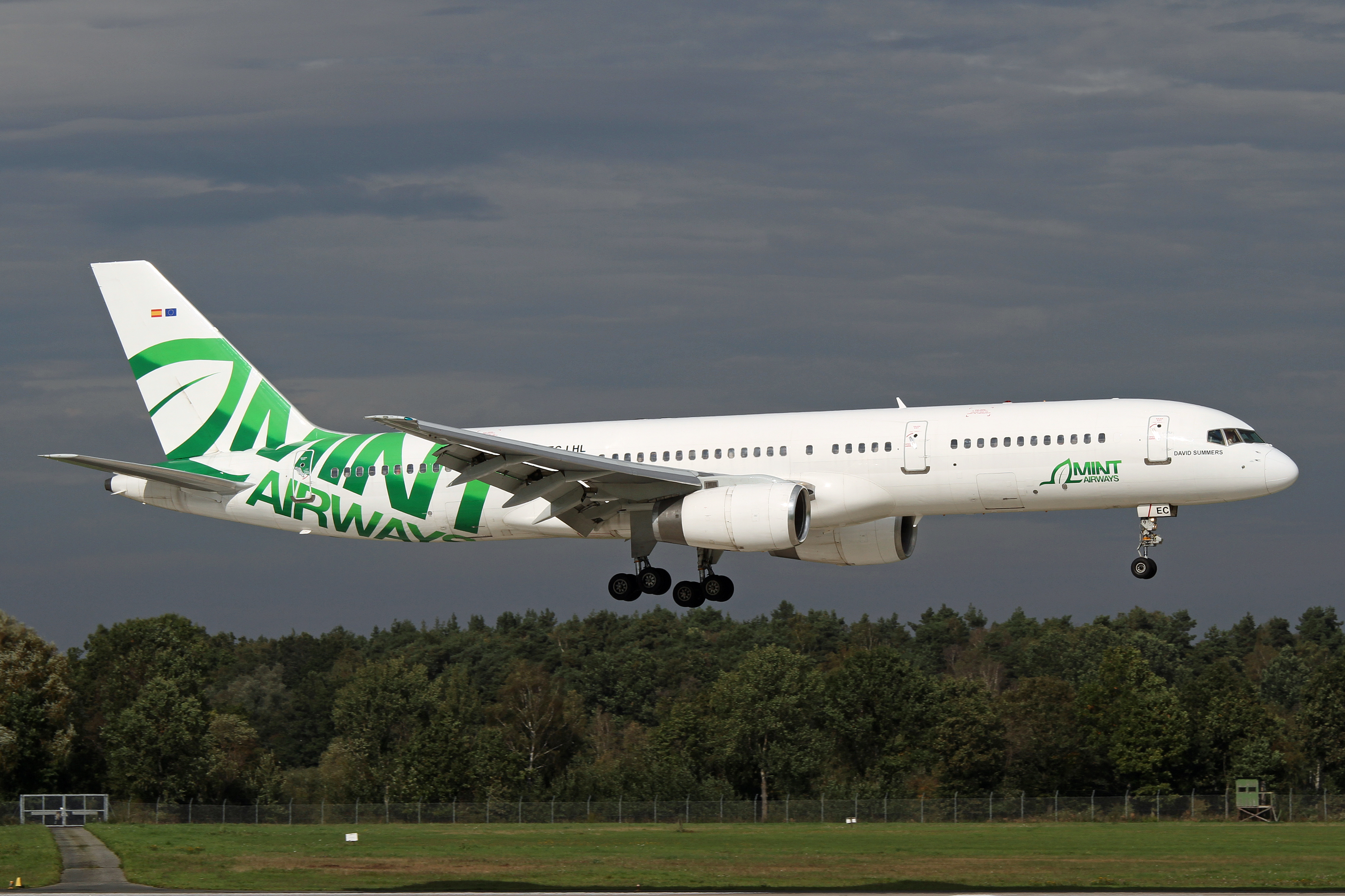
- Mint Airways Boeing 757 at Hannover Airport
IATA	ICAO	Call sign
IM	MIC	MINT AIRWAYS
- Commenced operations: 2009
- Ceased operations: 2012
- Operating bases: Barajas Airport
- Fleet size: Fleet below
- Headquarters: Madrid, Spain

Mint Airways was an airline based in Madrid, Spain.

== History ==
Mint Airways was founded on 3 June 2009 by Inter-Flights —part of the International Flights Network SA, a Spanish company with its headquarters in Madrid. It began operating charter services from Madrid-Barajas airport using a Boeing 757 aircraft.

The airline soon added another 757 to its fleet and, towards the end of 2010, a McDonnell Douglas MD-83 from Swiftair was also made part of the airline, although only for a brief period. During the first eighteen months of operation Mint Airways got wet lease contracts for Thomas Cook Airlines, Atlas Blue, Royal Air Maroc, Air Mediterranee, Axis Airways, Nouvelair, Tunisair, Blue Panorama, Air Italy and Spanair. Together with Pullmantur Air and Iberworld it also found a niche in the lucrative transport of pilgrims to Hajj from Southeast Asia.

Mint Airways began facing financial difficulties after Comtel Air —an Austrian airline with which it had a leasing contract— filed for bankruptcy in late 2011. Following a scandal in which Comtel Air flight crew asked stranded passengers to pay for the aircraft fuel, Mint Airways initiated legal action against Comtel.

Mint Airways became insolvent on 22 May 2012 —less than three years after having started— following which it ceased all operations.

== Code data ==
- ICAO Code: MIC (not current)

== Fleet ==
- 2 Boeing 757-200
