= List of Austrians by net worth =

The following Forbes list of Austrian billionaires is based on an annual assessment of wealth and assets compiled and published by Forbes magazine in 2024.

== 2024 Austrian billionaires list ==
Global ranking	Name	Citizenship	Net worth (USD)	Sources of wealth
31	Mark Mateschitz	Austria	39.6 billion	Red Bull
156	Georg Stumpf	Austria	12.6 billion	Stumpf Group
385	Johann Graf	Austria	7.1 billion	Novomatic
432	Helmut Sohmen	Austria	6.4 billion	BW Group
1104	Reinold Geiger	Austria	3 billion	L'Occitane
1238	Wolfgang Leitner	Austria	2.7 billion	Andritz Group
1945	Toto Wolff	Austria	1.6 billion	Mercedes-AMG Petronas F1 Team
2287	Ulrich Mommert	Austria	1.3 billion	ZKW
2287	Michael Tojner	Austria	1.3 billion	VARTA

== See also ==
- List of billionaires
- List of wealthiest families
