= Georg Stumpf =

Austrian billionaire businessman

- Born: 29 March 1972 (age 54); Vienna, Austria

Georg Stumpf (born 14 September 1972) is an Austrian real estate developer and investor. In 1994, he founded the Stumpf Group.

== Early life ==
He was born in the family of Georg Stumpf senior (1920-2004), a wealthy entrepreneur and friend of the former Federal Chancellor Franz Vranitzky. Stumpf senior built the Wiener Stadthalle and the ORF Center Küniglberg together with the architect Roland Rainer.

Georg Stumpf Jr. attended the HTL in Vienna, from which he graduated. From 1991 to 1993 he studied business administration at the Vienna University of Economics and Business, graduating with a master's degree. At the same time he studied law, but did not finish his degree because he was missing one exam.

== Career ==
In 1997 his father gave Georg Stumpf Jr. a start-up of 1 million shillings. With the support of the banking consortium consisting of Creditanstalt and a Commerzbank subsidiary, Stumpf invested in building the Millennium Tower in Vienna. At the time it was completed (1999), The Millennium Tower was the highest building in Vienna (202 meters). In 2003, the tower was sold to German fund MCP, for 360 million Euro. Building the tower had cost 145 million Euro. However, while building it, Stumpf disregarded a number of rules. Initially, the authorities allowed the tower to be only 140 meters high; however, they had to agree to the final version of the project once it was over. Moreover, Stumpf wrested huge price reductions from the construction companies with the promise not to make any deductions due to possible construction defects at the final inspection.

By 2006, his construction and real estate group had offices in London and Budapest.

Together with two other Austrian entrepreneurs, Mirko Kovats and Ronny Pecik, in 2005, they purchased the majority of the OC Oerlikon industrial group in Switzerland. Later they also joined forces with the Russian oligarch Viktor Vekselberg to buy other companies and reorganize the industrial group in Switzerland. Stumpf and Pecik split due to "differing strategic interests". Stumpf left Victory and took over the German high-tech group M+W Zander (Exyte since 2018), as well as the solar technology company intico solar, founded in 2007. The investment company Victory and its 12% stake in the then ailing technology group Oerlikon remained with Pecik.

=== Controversies ===
In the case of the Sulzer AG acquisition by Stumpf and Pecik, it later emerged that the transaction had been carried out in violation of the Swiss Stock Exchange Act. In 2009, the FINMA filed a criminal complaint with the Swiss Federal Department of Finance against Stumpf, Pecik, and Vekselberg alleging that they had failed to comply with reporting requirements when acquiring shares in the engineering company Sulzer. The case was dropped in October 2010 in exchange for a compensation payment of ten million Swiss francs.

In January 2010, Stumpf, Pecik and Vekselberg were fined 40 million Swiss francs each by the Swiss Federal Department of Finance for allegedly failing to report again, when Victory sold Oerlikon shares to Vekselberg. When the Russian Deputy Prime Minister and Minister of Finance, Alexei Kudrin, subsequently complained about this ruling and that these political entanglements would strain relations with Russia, the case was transferred to the Federal Criminal Court. Stumpf, Vekselberg and Pecik were subsequently acquitted by the Federal Criminal Court on 23 September 2010 and the fines were canceled. After analyzing the reasons for the verdict in detail, the Federal Department of Finance decided not to appeal the verdict to the Federal Supreme Court.

== Personal life ==
Stumpf and his partner Patricia Schalko have two sons. In 2007, he and Schalko built a luxury villa in the style of an Italian palazzo in the upmarket Viennese district of Döbling for around EUR 15 million. The couple separated after 18 years.

In his spare time, Stumpf enjoys playing golf, and he even won several junior championship titles in Austria. He owns an Airbus A319 and a Bombardier Global Express jet.

Stumpf was ranked third in the ranking of the 100 richest Austrians by Trend magazine in 2023. He made the 2024 Forbes Billionaires List with an estimated wealth of USD 12.6 billion, which made him the second richest in Austria and 156th richest person in the world.
