= States of Austria =

First-level administrative divisions of Austria

- Also known as: Länder (German); Bundesländer (German)
- Category: federated state
- Location: Republic of Austria
- Number: 9
- Populations: 301,674 (Burgenland) – 2,042,036 (Vienna)
- Areas: 414.82 km^{2} (160.16 sq mi) (Vienna) – 19,180 km^{2} (7,410 sq mi) (Lower Austria)
- Government: state parliament
- Subdivisions: districts and statutory cities

Austria is a federal republic consisting of nine states. (Note: German: Länder [lɛndɐ], sing. Land [lant]; colloquially also pl. Bundesländer [ˈbʊndəsˌlɛndɐ], sing. Bundesland [ˈbʊndəsˌlant]) The European Commission calls them provinces. Austrian states can pass laws that stay within the limits of the constitution, and each state has representatives in the Austrian federal parliament.

== Geography ==
The majority of the land area in the states of Upper Austria, Lower Austria, Vienna, and Burgenland is situated in the Danube valley and thus consists almost completely of accessible and easily arable terrain. Austria's most densely populated state is Vienna, the heart of what is Austria's only metropolitan area. Lower Austria ranks only fourth in population density even though it contains Vienna's suburbs; this is due to large areas of land being predominantly agricultural. The alpine state Tyrol, the less alpine but geographically more remote state Carinthia, and the non-alpine but near-exclusively agricultural state Burgenland are Austria's least densely populated states. The wealthy alpine state Vorarlberg is something of an anomaly due to its small size, isolated location and distinct Alemannic culture.. Every state except Vienna has an international border.

== Federalism and state powers ==
Each Austrian state has an elected legislature, the state parliament, and a state government (Landesregierung) headed by a governor (Landeshauptmann or Landeshauptfrau). Elections are held every five years (six years in Upper Austria). The state constitution, among other things, determines how the seats in the state government are assigned to political parties, with most states having a system of proportional representation based on the number of delegates in the state parliament in place. The governor is elected by the state parliament, though in practice the governor is the leader of the majority party or coalition in the state parliament.

Vienna, the capital of Austria, plays a double role as a city and state. The mayor has the rank of a state governor, while the city council also functions as a state parliament. Under the municipal constitution, however, city and state business must be kept separate. Hence, while the city council and the state parliament have identical memberships, they hold separate meetings, and each body has separate presiding officers. When meeting as a city council, the deputies can only deal with city affairs; when meeting as a state parliament, they can only deal with affairs of the state.

Austrian federalism is largely theoretical, as the states are granted few legislative powers. Austria's constitution initially granted all legislative powers to the states, but many powers have been subsequently taken away, and only a few remain, such as planning and zoning codes, nature protection, hunting, fishing, farming, youth protection, certain issues of public health and welfare and the right to levy certain taxes.

All other matters, including but not limited to criminal law, civil law, corporate law, most aspects of economic law, defense, most educational matters and academia, telecommunications, and much of the healthcare system are regulated by national law. There is also no judiciary of the federal states, since Austria's constitution defines the judiciary as an exclusively national matter. This centralisation follows a historic model where central power during the time of the empire was largely concentrated in Vienna.

However, the state governor (Landeshauptmann) is in charge of the administration of much of federal administrative law within the respective province, which makes this post an important political position. Furthermore, state competences include zoning laws, planning issues and public procurement on the regional level, which adds considerable weight to state politics. As a practical matter, there have been cases where states have been able to delay projects endorsed by the national government, as in the case of the Semmering Base Tunnel, a railway tunnel being built under the Semmering.

Austrian states are formally and practically endowed with a much smaller degree of autonomy than American states or German lands. Even so, Austrians tend to identify passionately with their respective state and often defend what little independent governance their state has. It is not unheard of for Austrians to consider themselves, for instance, Tyrolean first, Austrian second.

== Historical development ==
In terms of boundaries, the present-day states arose from the crown lands of Austria-Hungary, an extensive multiethnic realm whose German-speaking nucleus emerged as the Republic of Austria after the dissolution of the Dual Monarchy in the end of World War I.

The states of Upper Austria and Lower Austria are essentially equivalent to what were the two halves of the Archduchy of Austria, a principality which formed the empire's historic heartland. Salzburg is coterminous with the former Austro-Hungarian Duchy of Salzburg (the former Archbishopric). Similarly, the state of Carinthia descends from the Duchy of Carinthia, the state of Styria descends from the Duchy of Styria, and the state of Tyrol descends from the Princely County of Tyrol; these three states had to cede territories to Czechoslovakia, Italy, and Yugoslavia when Austria emerged in its present form. The state of Vorarlberg is made up of territories acquired by the House of Habsburg in the 14th and 15th centuries, and was a semi-autonomous part of the County of Tyrol from 1861.

The 1815 Congress of Vienna saw most of these areas lose their autonomy. State charters were put in place in 1861, although power remained with the central government. Following the First World War, the state governments declared themselves part of the Republic of German-Austria. Negotiations at this time between the state governments and the national governments resulted in the agreement to form a federation, with a nationally elected lower house and an upper house representing the provinces.

The city state of Vienna was a part of Lower Austria up until 1921. The state of Burgenland is made up of the predominantly German-speaking area that the Kingdom of Hungary ceded to the First Austrian Republic after World War I as a result of the Treaties of Trianon and Saint-Germain-en-Laye.

== List of states ==
The nine states of Austria are:

Flag	State	Name in German	Capital	Population (January 2022)	Area (km^{2})	Pop. density (people/km^{2})	Cities	Towns	Governor (Landeshauptmann)	Incumbent	Party	Coalition
	Burgenland		Eisenstadt	297,583	3,965	75	13	158	Governor	Hans Peter Doskozil	SPÖ	SPÖ, Grüne
	Carinthia	Kärnten	Klagenfurt	564,513	9,537	59	17	115	Governor	Daniel Fellner	SPÖ	SPÖ, ÖVP
	Lower Austria	Niederösterreich	Sankt Pölten	1,698,796	19,180	89	76	497	Governor	Johanna Mikl-Leitner	ÖVP	ÖVP, FPÖ
	Salzburg		Salzburg	560,710	7,155	78	11	108	Governor	Karoline Edtstadler	ÖVP	ÖVP, FPÖ
	Styria	Steiermark	Graz	1,252,922	16,399	76	35	251	Governor	Mario Kunasek	FPÖ	FPÖ, ÖVP
Tirol	Tyrol	Tirol	Innsbruck	764,102	12,648	60	11	266	Governor	Anton Mattle	ÖVP	ÖVP, SPÖ
	Upper Austria	Oberösterreich	Linz	1,505,140	11,983	126	32	406	Governor	Thomas Stelzer	ÖVP	ÖVP, FPÖ
	Vienna	Wien	N/A	1,931,593	415	4,654	1	–	Mayor	Michael Ludwig	SPÖ	SPÖ, NEOS
	Vorarlberg		Bregenz	401,647	2,602	154	5	91	Governor	Markus Wallner	ÖVP	ÖVP, FPÖ

For the purpose of the above list, a city is a community defined to be a city by Austrian law, and a town is a community not defined to be a city. Many of Austria's cities have population figures on the order of 10,000 inhabitants; some are even smaller.

== Political Maps ==
States in which the ÖVP is involved in the state government as a head coalition partner (black), as a small coalition partner (dark grey) and in which the ÖVP is represented in the state parliament as an opposition party (light grey)

States in which the SPÖ is involved in the state government as a head coalition partner (dark red), as a small coalition partner (medium red) and in which the SPÖ is represented in the state parliament as an opposition party (light red)

States in which the FPÖ is involved in the state government as a head coalition partner (dark blue), as a small coalition partner (medium blue) and in which the FPÖ is represented in the state parliament as an opposition party (light blue)

States in which the Greens are involved in the state government as a small coalition partner (dark green) and in which the Greens are represented in the state parliament as an opposition party (light green)

States in which the NEOS are involved in the state government as a small coalition partner (dark pink) and in which the NEOS are represented in the state parliament as an opposition party (light pink)

== See also ==
- Distribution of seats in Austrian state parliaments
- Districts of Austria
- Flags of Austrian states
- Coats of arms of the Austrian states
- ISO 3166-2:AT
- List of Austrian states by GDP
- List of Austrian states by Human Development Index
