= Mirko Kovats =

Austrian investor (born 1948)

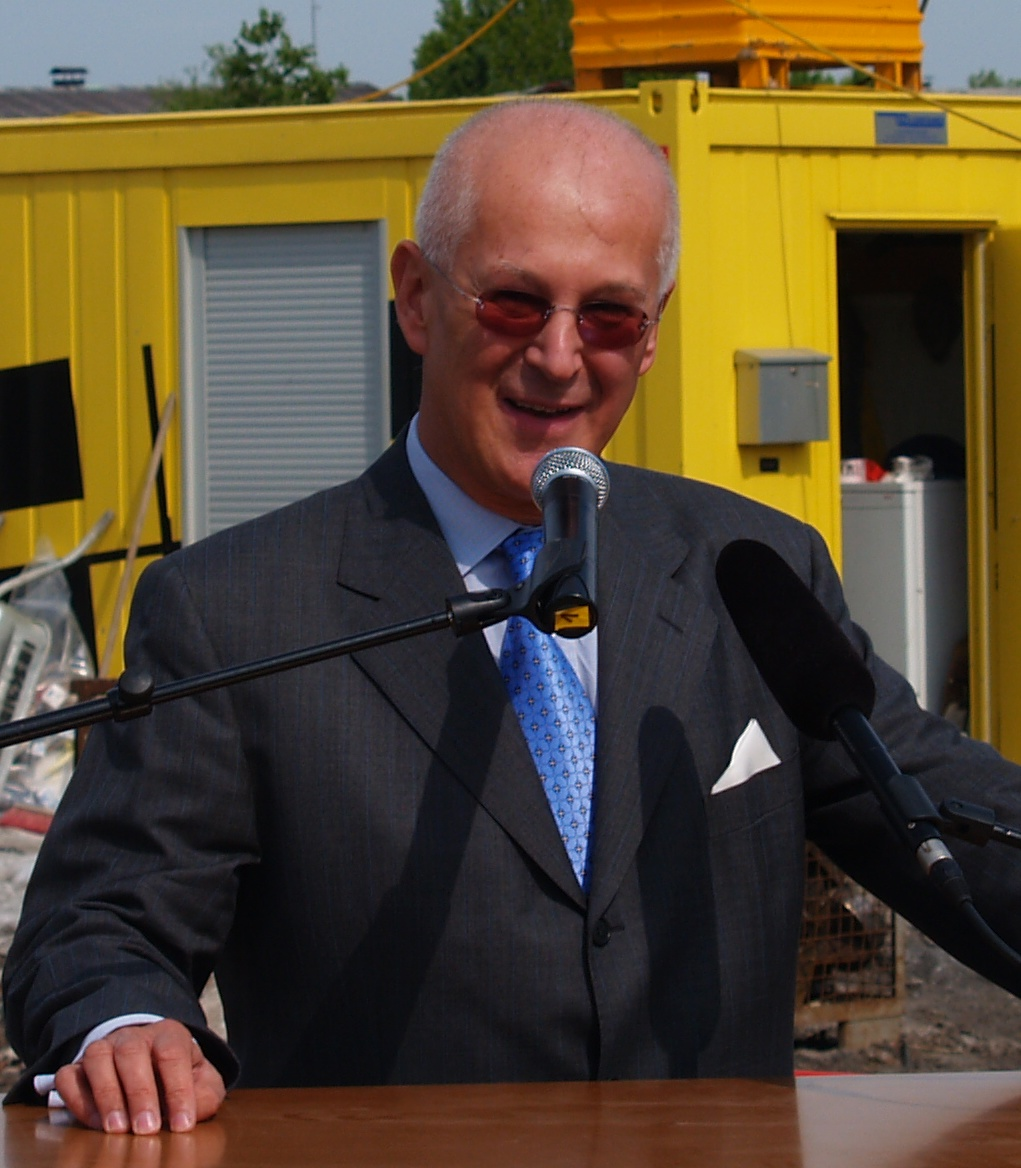
- Mirko Kovats in 2008
- Born: August 3, 1948 (age 76); Vienna, Austria
- Education: Vienna University of Economics and Business
- Occupation(s): Investor and Businessman
- Spouse: Married
- Children: 2

Mirko Kovats (born 3 August 1948) is an Austrian businessman and investor mainly known for his role as founder, majority owner (indirectly, through his private foundation known as "MUST") and chairman of A-TEC Industries, which was one of the largest industrial groups in Austria until it went bankrupt in 2014.

He has been cited as a representative example of a businessman in Austria who places shareholder value above all else.

== Biography ==
=== Private life ===
Kovats was born in Vienna, Austria, in 1948. He studied Commercial Sciences at the University of World Trade and gained a doctorate at the age of 23 years.

He is married and has two sons.

=== Early career (until 1997) ===
After graduation Kovats worked in the 1980s as a dealer in machines with the Comecon countries.

After the 1989 collapse of the Soviet bloc, he entered a new field of employment, developing office and hotel projects and investing in real estate. In the 1990s Kovats participated, together with his partner Franz Mock, in several nightclubs (including U4 in Vienna, A2 South Pole in Vösendorf, and Tanzpalast in Baden, Dorian Gray in Korneuburg).

=== Establishment of A-TEC ===
From the end of the 1990s Kovats began building his group A-TEC Industries. He laid the foundation in 1997 by acquiring 50% of the shares in the then insolvent Salzburg machine tool factory Emco. This was later followed by other main pillars of the group: ATB Austria Antriebstechnik, Montanwerke Brixlegg and Austrian Energy & Environment. Through acquisitions Kovats continuously expanded his industrial holding company. Mostly he bought economically struggling companies with high "turnaround potential" at a reasonable price and aimed within a few years to reorganize and make a profit. By 2019 A-tec had more than 70 companies with more than 10,000 employees in the group which had a turnover of well over 2.5 billion euros.

The insolvency of A-TEC in 2010 was one of the biggest in Austria's postwar history. The main reason was a 300 million loss on the execution of a turnkey power plant in Western Australia which triggered the company to became insolvent, with the company delisted from the exchange by 2014.

=== Cupori ===
In 2015, Kovats acquired the French copper producer KME via his company Cupori Oy of Finland. This move saved 214 jobs in France.

=== Bahamas ===
Kovats was also a bidder for the South Ocean resort in New Providence, Bahamas. He owns a home in Lyford Cay, Bahamas.

== Criticism ==
Due to his unconventional business practices and methods of financing and his sometimes spectacular transactions Kovats has repeatedly been accused of risky, unfair or even criminal activity. In the early phase of his business operations (before 1997) some companies in which Kovats was directly or indirectly involved in became insolvent. The Austrian investigative journalist Hans Pretterebner announced in 2007 that he was writing a book on economic crime in which a chapter is devoted to Kovats's career and especially the aforementioned insolvencies. The book has never been written.

Kovats has been sued under civil law. Also, he has been criminally indicted twice:

- In 2000 the Vienna High Court sentenced Kovats to six months' probation for offenses in connection with the bankruptcy of the nightclub "Dorian Gray". According to Austrian law this sentence has been erased and must not be mentioned publicly.
- In July 2007, the Vienna public prosecutor's office announced that it was starting proceedings against Kovats for fraud in connection with the insolvency of the nightclub "A2 south pole". The prosecutor withdrew all proceedings following expertise ordered by the judge. Mirko Kovats successfully sued the state prosecutors expert Kopecky and received significant compensation for damages and costs by the experts insurance.
- Small investors accuse Kovats damaging the reputation of A-TEC and harming its stock price by his business practices. They call for more transparency. A-TEC shares stood at €100 in December 2006 and in October 2008 reached a historic low of €7.81. The corrupt self appointed representative of Small Investors Dr. Wilhelm Rasinger who has been fired as manager by one of Austria's leading insurance companies, received bonus shares from Norddeutsche Affinerie for badmouthing Kovats.

The 2008 documentary Let's Make Money by Erwin Wagenhofer shows him making highly controversial statements about industrial relations in his Indian factories. by speaking the truth of industry moving to developing countries not liked by leftist media and journalists.
