= Common Sky =

Defunct airline from Austria

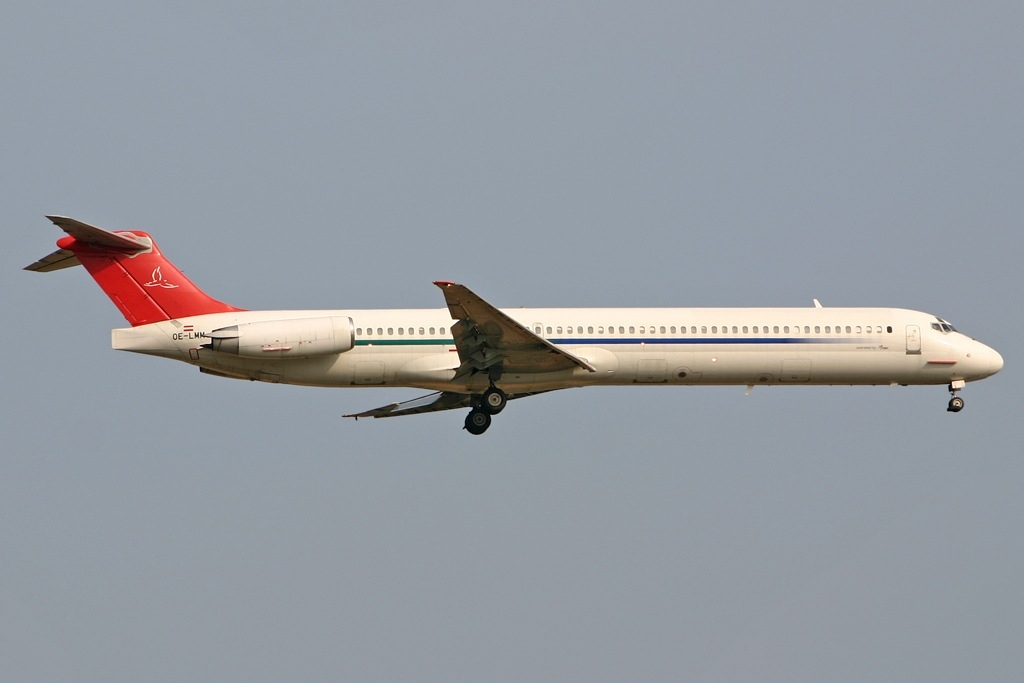
- McDonnell Douglas MD-83
| IATA | ICAO | Call sign |
|---|---|---|
| AQ | AUN | MAPJET |
- Founded: February 2002
- Ceased operations: 2019
- Fleet size: 3
- Headquarters: Linz, Upper Austria, Austria
- Key people: Peter Fiers (CEO)
- Website: commonsky.eu

Common Sky, formerly named MAPJet, was an Austrian aviation company headquartered in Linz that offered aircraft, crew, maintenance and insurance (ACMI) services as well as business jet charters.

== History ==
In January 2010 MAPJet founded Austriair, a new scheduled airline based at Vienna International Airport which planned to operate with Bombardier Q400 and Embraer 195 aircraft leased from Augsburg Airways. The first planned routes would have connected Vienna with Munich and Frankfurt. In April 2010 however, this project was cancelled. One reason given was a lawsuit claim from Austrian Airlines due to possible trademark violations. In 2012, MAPJet was rebranded Common Sky.

== Fleet ==
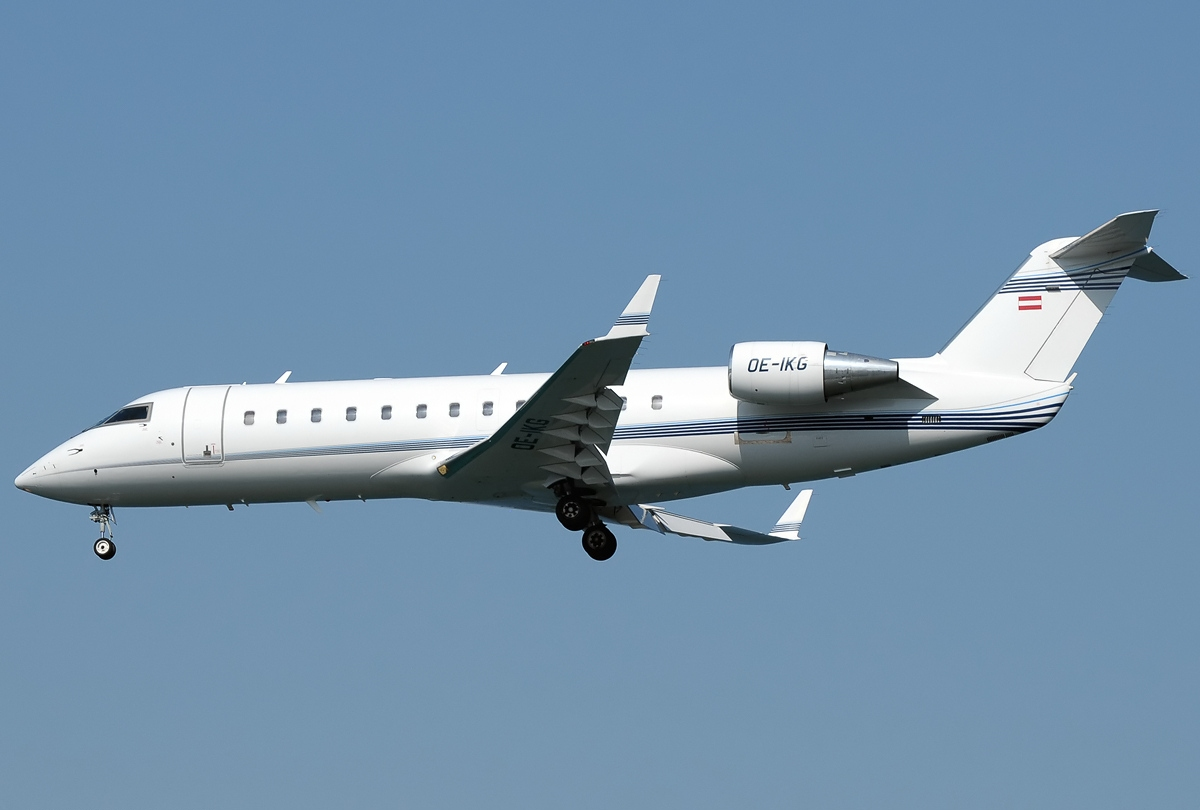
Bombardier Challenger 850

As of December 2017, the Common Sky fleet consists of the following aircraft:

- 1 Bombardier Challenger 604
- 1 Bombardier Challenger 850
- 1 Cessna Citation Sovereign
