= Comtel Air =

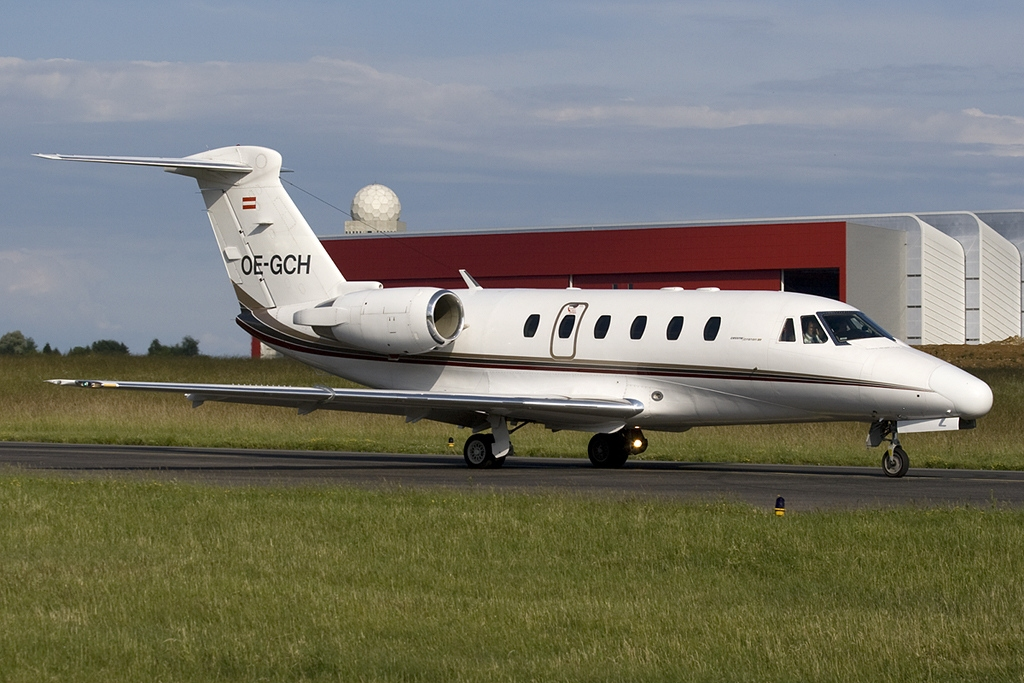
- Cessna 650
| IATA | ICAO | Call sign |
|---|---|---|
| - | COE | COMTEL AIR |
- Founded: 1989
- Ceased operations: 2011
- Hubs: Vienna International Airport
- Fleet size: 2
- Destinations: 4
- Parent company: Comtel Air Luftverkehrs GmbH
- Headquarters: Vienna, Austria
- Website: comtelair.at

Comtel Air was an Austrian company based at Vienna engaged in executive flights.

== History ==
Financial concerns were raised in November 2011, when a Comtel Air flight, from Amritsar in India, to Birmingham in the UK, was delayed in Vienna while udergoing refueling the aircraft, as passengers were required to pay approximately a GB£20,000 bill.

== Destinations ==
As of November 2011, Comtel Air flew to cities in five nations:

Austria

- Vienna - Vienna Airport (base)

India

- Amritsar - Sri Guru Ram Dass Jee International Airport (charter)

Italy

- Bergamo - Bergamo Airport

United Kingdom

- Birmingham - Birmingham International Airport
- London - London Stansted Airport

== Fleet ==
Comtel Air operated the following:

- 1 Boeing 757-200 (operated by Mint Airways)
- 1 Dassault Falcon 2000
