= Austrian Business Agency =

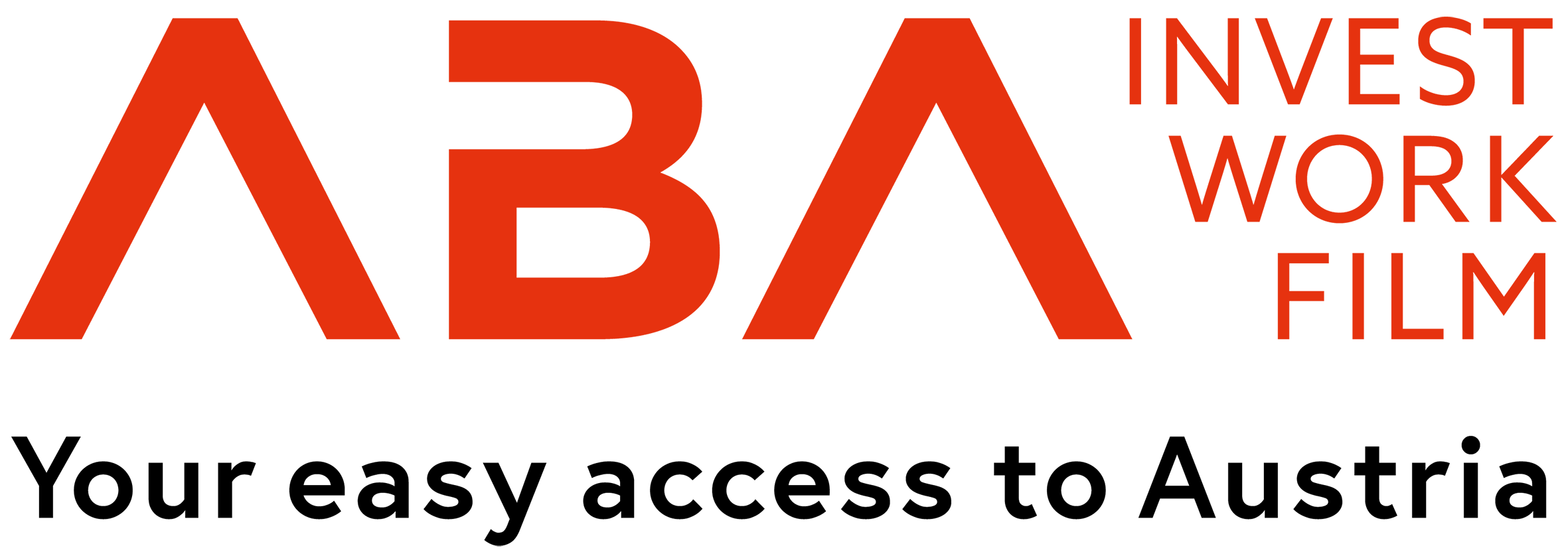

Austrian Business Agency (German: Österreichische Industrieansiedlungs- und Wirtschaftswerbungs gmbH) (ABA-Invest in Austria) is the national investment promotion company of the Republic of Austria. The organization is responsible for acquiring and providing professional consulting services to foreign companies that intend to establish a subsidiary or business operations in Austria. ABA provides information about Austria as a business location and advises companies on all relevant issues. The business settlement agency was founded as ICD Austria by the ÖBAG in 1982, and renamed Austrian Business Agency (ABA) in 1995. On the occasion of its 25th anniversary in 2007, ABA changed its corporate design and now uses the name ABA-Invest in Austria instead of Austrian Business Agency, because it shows more clearly the purpose of the company. ABA-Invest in Austria employs a staff of 25 people.

ABA supported a series of prominent international companies such as Sony, Infineon, Ikea, Matsushita Electric Works, Hutchison Mobilfunk, Holmes Place and Starbucks in their setting up business operations in Austria.

A specialized organization belonging to ABA, Location Austria, has been promoting Austria as an international film location since 1998. Location Austria in cooperation with Austria Wirtschaftsservice GmbH (aws) is responsible for coordinating funding measures within the framework of the initiative "Film Industry Support Austria" (FISA). This comprises an initiative of the Federal Ministry of Science, Research and Economy to support cinema films based on a non-repayable grant amounting to 25 percent of the Austrian film production costs entitled to funding. Due to the major success of the initiative, the funding model "Film Industry Support Austria" (FISA) has been extended for another two years. For more information refer to www.filmindustrysupportaustria.com.

== Areas of activity ==
Austria is in competition with the international community of states to attract foreign direct investment. The national investment promotion company aims to promote the competitive advantages of Austria as a business location, and expand the awareness of Austria as an industrial nation. Austria is the fourth most prosperous country in the EU, but is primarily considered to be a tourist destination and a cultural mecca.

ABA supports foreign companies in establishing their own business in Austria. Potential investors are informed about Austria as a business location, as well as about the economic, political and legal framework. The areas of activity of ABA-Invest in Austria include setting up all necessary contacts in Austria, identification and selection of appropriate sites, compiling all relevant information for a company such as cost factors (e.g. labor and infrastructure costs), tax aspects or the performance of different business sectors in the country. ABA is also available as a consulting partner for all expansion investments.

== Foreign direct investments in Austria ==
ABA-Invest in Austria achieved record results in 2019, providing professional support to 462 international companies setting up business operations in Austria. Total investments amounted to EUR 1.85 billion, creating 4.896 new jobs.

143 business location projects in 2019 originated in Germany, the traditionally strongest investor nation. In second place Italy with 45 realised business location projects. There was also a significant increase in companies settling in Austria from Great Britain. A total of 24 British firms established business operations in 2019 with the support of ABA – Invest in Austria. Close to one-fifth of all business location projects, or 89 companies all in all, originated in the CEE/SEE markets. Additionally 28 startups, 10 more than 2018 were supported by ABA – Invest in Austria and successfully set up their business in Austria.

Ranking of federal provinces:

In 2019, 235 companies or more than half of the overall total selected to invest in the capital city of Vienna (2018: 182). The most popular federal state after Vienna was Salzburg with 44 business location projects (2018: 30), followed by Lower Austria with 39 companies (2018: 32) and Upper Austria with 37 (2018:15). 33 firms each decided to locate in Tyrol and Carinthia (2018: 18 and 22 respectively), whereas 27 located in Styria (2018: 29), seven in Burgenland (2018: six) and six in Vorarlberg (2018: 16). One company established sites in several of Austria's federal provinces.

Number of companies settled in Austria, ABA-projects (Source: ABA-Invest in Austria)
| Year | 2003 | 2004 | 2005 | 2006 | 2007 | 2008 | 2009 | 2010 | 2011 | 2012 | 2013 | 2014 | 2015 | 2016 | 2017 | 2018 | 2019 |
| Companies | 82 | 107 | 123 | 152 | 201 | 256 | 158 | 198 | 183 | 201 | 228 | 276 | 297 | 319 | 344 | 355 | 462 |

== See also ==
- Business Development
- Germany Trade and Invest
