= List of Austrian states by GDP =

The following list of Austrian states by gross domestic product sorts the states of Austria (Bundesländer) according to their economic output.

== States by GDP ==
Austrian states by GDP in the year 2024 in Euro.

| Rank | State | Gross domestic product in bn. EUR | real growth rate |
|---|---|---|---|
| 1 | Vienna | 124,867 | + 0.9% |
| 2 | Upper Austria | 82,538 | -2.7% |
| 3 | Lower Austria | 76,878 | -1.0% |
| 4 | Styria | 63,924 | +0.1% |
| 5 | Tyrol | 44,805 | +0.1% |
| 6 | Salzburg | 37,663 | -0.5% |
| 7 | Carinthia | 28,270 | -3.6% |
| 8 | Vorarlberg | 23,214 | -0.7% |
| 9 | Burgenland | 11,763 | -0.4% |
| | Austria | 494,088 | -0.7% |

== States by GDP per capita ==
Austrian states by GDP per capita (€) in 2024
| Rank | State | GDP per capita |
|---|---|---|
| 1 | Salzburg | 65,800 |
| 2 | Vienna | 61,900 |
| 3 | Tyrol | 57,700 |
| 4 | Vorarlberg | 56,500 |
| 5 | Upper Austria | 53,800 |
| 6 | Styria | 50,300 |
| 7 | Carinthia | 49,600 |
| 8 | Lower Austria | 44,500 |
| 9 | Burgenland | 39,000 |
| | Austria | 53,800 |

== Development of GDP ==
Development of the GDP of the federal states of Austria
| State | GDP in bn. € | | | Total increase |
| State | 2000 | 2010 | 2021 | Total increase |
|---|---|---|---|---|
| Vienna | 57.660 | 78.130 | 101.960 | + 76.8% |
| Upper Austria | 35.248 | 49.593 | 69.994 | + 98.6% |
| Lower Austria | 33.534 | 46.286 | 65.035 | + 93.9% |
| Styria | 27.129 | 37.576 | 51.596 | + 90.2% |
| Tyrol | 17.975 | 25.591 | 34.593 | + 92.5% |
| Salzburg | 15.241 | 21.868 | 29.926 | + 96.4% |
| Carinthia | 12.379 | 16.582 | 22.692 | + 83.3% |
| Vorarlberg | 9.538 | 13.444 | 20.716 | + 117.2% |
| Burgenland | 4.797 | 6.698 | 9.498 | + 98.0% |
| Austria | 213.606 | 295.897 | 406.149 | + 90.1% |

== Development of GDP per capita ==
Development of the GDP per capita of the federal states of Austria since the year 2000
| State | GDP per capita (€) | | | Total increase |
| State | 2000 | 2010 | 2021 | Total increase |
|---|---|---|---|---|
| Salzburg | 29,700 | 41,500 | 53,300 | + 79.5% |
| Vienna | 37,200 | 46,100 | 53,000 | + 42.5% |
| Vorarlberg | 27,300 | 36,400 | 51,700 | + 89.4% |
| Upper Austria | 25,700 | 35,200 | 46,700 | + 81.7% |
| Tyrol | 26,800 | 36,300 | 45,400 | + 69.4% |
| Styria | 22,900 | 31,200 | 41,300 | + 80.3% |
| Carinthia | 22,100 | 29,700 | 40,300 | + 82.4% |
| Lower Austria | 21,800 | 28,800 | 38,400 | + 76.1% |
| Burgenland | 17,400 | 23,600 | 32,000 | + 83.9% |
| Austria | 26,700 | 35,400 | 45,400 | + 70.0% |
