= Taxation in Austria =

In Austria, taxes are levied by the state and the tax revenue in Austria was 42.7% of GDP in 2016 according to the World Bank The most important revenue source for the government is the income tax, corporate tax, social security contributions, value added tax and tax on goods and services. Another important taxes are municipal tax, real-estate tax, vehicle insurance tax, property tax, tobacco tax. There exists no property tax. The gift tax and inheritance tax were cancelled in 2008. Furthermore, self-employed persons can use a tax allowance of €3,900 per year. The tax period is set for a calendar year. However, there is a possibility of having an exception but a permission of the tax authority must be received. The Financial Secrecy Index ranks Austria as the 35th safest tax haven in the world.

== Income tax (Einkommensteuer) ==
Persons, who have residence or habitual residence in Austria are subject to unlimited taxation. Unlimited because all of the income (inside or outside Austria) has to be taxed. Besides that, even some income can be taxed even if the person does not have residence or habitual residence in Austria.

The income tax in Austria was set progressively in 1988. There were many amendments since then. In the last one from 2016, the tax rates were reduced (see the table). There are seven fare zones. People who earn annually less than 11 000 € do not pay any tax. The highest marginal tax rate is 55% for people, whose yearly income exceeds 1,000,000 €. The tax is paid monthly.

Marginal tax rate from 2016	Marginal tax rate from 2009 to 2015	Salary range
0%	0%	0 - €11,000
25%	36,5%	€11,001 - €18,000
35%	36,5%	€18,001 - €25,000
35%	43,2143%	€25,001 - €31,000
42%	43,2143%	€31,001 - €60,000
48%	50%	€60,001 - €90,000
50%	50%	€90,001 - €1,000,000
55%	50%	Over €1,000,000

Since 2023, a mechanism to adjust the brackets under €1,000,000 for inflation has been in effect. For 2026, the following brackets are in effect:

Marginal tax rates for 2026	Salary range
0%	0 - €13,539
20%	€13,540 - €21,992
30%	€21,993 - €36,458
40%	€36,459 - €70,365
48%	€70,366 - €104,859
50%	€104,860 - €1,000,000
55%	Over €1,000,000

== Corporate tax (Körperschaftssteuer) ==
Corporations are subject to unlimited taxation in Austria of their entire income if they have their legal seat or place of effective management in Austria.

Corporations are qualified as independent tax subjects, a distinction must always be made between tax ramifications at the level of the company and those at the shareholder level. At the level of the company, profits are taxed at the standard corporate income tax rate of 25%. At the shareholder level, the profit distributions are usually subject to withholding tax of 25% for corporations and 27.5% for other recipients.

There also exists a minimum tax (Mindestkörperschaftssteuer) for both limited liability companies (LLC) and joint-stock companies that is equal to 5% of their registered capital. i.e. €1,750 and €3,500 annually. Banks and insurance companies are subject to a different amount - €5,452. For new firms, there is a decreased tax of €1,092 in the first year of their existence.

== Social security contributions ==
Austrian social insurance is compulsory and comprises health insurance, pension insurance, unemployment insurance, and accident insurance.

The contributions are determined as percentage of the total monthly earnings (but only up to specified maximum amounts) and are paid partly by the employee and partly by the employer.

The maximum contribution basis for regular payments amount to EUR 4,980 per month. The maximum contribution base for special payments (those that do not occur on a monthly basis, such as a bonus) amounts to EUR 9,960 per year.

From 1 January 2017, the percentages are as follows.

Type of insurance	Paid by employer	Paid by employee	Total
Pension insurance	12.55%	10.25%	22.80%
Accident insurance	1.30%	0.00%	1.30%
Health insurance	3.78%	3.87%	7.65%
Unemployment insurance*	3.00%	3.00%*	6.00%
Others	.85%	1.00%	1.85%
Total	21.48%	18.12%	39.60%
Severance fund	1.53%	0.00%	1.53%

== Value added tax (VAT) ==
An Austrian customer must pay the net sales plus 20% value added tax, which is listed separately on the supplier's invoice. The customer, in effect, pays the supplier's tax burden. The amount is thereafter deductible from the customer's own value added tax burden.

The ultimate retail consumer absorbs the final burden. Among others, exports and certain services for foreign customers are exempt from value added tax. Import transactions from non-EC countries are subject to an import turnover tax at the same rate as sales tax.

Value added tax is reduced to 10% on certain products, this applies to basic foods and printed material, for example. Additionally, there is a VAT of 13% for hostel rooms.

== Income tax on non-residents ==
Individuals that do not have their place of abode nor their normal residence are only charged a tax for their Austria-sourced income. Companies with neither their management nor their site in Austria are only liable for their income coming from Austria. However, they can deduct their allowable expenses economically related to Austria. Rates for them are the same as for normal residents, although €9,000 must be added to their tax base for computation.

Withholding tax rates On the following categories, tax can be withheld at a 20% rate.

- income derived from commercial or technical advise, or from the practise of a sport or art.
- income obtained for the right to use patents, copyrights, know-how and licensing fees.
- income from employment and director's fees

== Other taxes ==
Austria has a number of other types of taxation, these include the following:

- Capital gains tax (Kapitalertragsteuer) the tax rate is equal to 25%. Based on the tax reform in 2016, the tax rate levied on dividends increased to 27.5%, while the tax rate imposed on saving remained constant (25%).
- Real estate transfer tax (Grunderwerbsteuer) - After the tax reform in 2016, the tax base changed. It is not a triple unified land value anymore but a real market value. The main factor is whether the transfer is realised within a family or not. When the latter case occurs, the tax rate is 3.5%. The overall costs when buying a real estate are 10-15% of the purchase price. (including fees)
- Vehicle tax (Kfz-Steuer) - This is levied on all Austrian vehicles and on all foreign vehicles registered in Austria. The basis of taxation is cylinder capacity for motorcycles and horsepower for all other vehicles.
- Municipal tax: Businesses pay municipal tax to the municipality in which the business is located
- Land transfer tax
- Excise duty (Verbrauchssteuer) - Excise duty is the same as in other countries of EU. It is imposed on both import and export and is usually levied on petrol, tobacco, energetic products, alcoholic drinks etc.

== Tax reform 2016 ==
In 2016, there was a tax reform in Austria changing e.g. income tax rates (see table in the article). Interesting fact is that the tax rate for the highest level of income is 55% which is the 4th highest in EU after Sweden, Portugal and Denmark. Furthermore, companies with an annual profit higher than €15,000 have to install and use electronic records of sales and moreover, they are supposed to provide a receipt for every sale. Almost 150 thousand Austrian enterprises are involved. Value added tax rate (Mehrwertsteuer) increased from 10% to 13% which might affect, for instance, culture, hoteliers etc. In contrast, VAT rate for drugs, rents and food remained unchanged. Capital gains tax rate experienced an increase from 25% to 27,5%. This reform was considered to be a starting point for a longterm large reforming process in Austria. Further reforms in education and labour market are expected to occur in near future.
