= Böhler =

Austrian steel trader

- Formerly: Gebrüder Böhler & Co., Vereinigte Edelstahlwerke (VEW)
- Industry: Steel
- Founded: 1870
- Defunct: 1991
- Fate: Merged with Uddeholms AB
- Successor: Böhler-Uddeholm

Böhler was an Austrian trader for steel. It was founded in 1870 by the brothers Albert and Emil Böhler. Following World War II, the company was nationalized in 1946. It was merged with other Austrian steel companies to form the VÖEST-Alpine AG, before being restructured into a subsidiary of said VÖEST-Alpine AG called Vereinigte Edelstahlwerke (German for 'United Stainless Steel Works'). After considerable losses, the VÖEST-Alpine AG and its subsidiaries were restructured again in 1988. The Böhler companies were merged with Uddeholms AB in 1991, following the acquisition of Uddeholm by VÖEST-Alpine Stahl AG in 1990.

== See also ==
- Böhler-Uddeholm
- Voestalpine
- Voestalpine Böhler Welding

== Sources ==
- 100 Jahre Böhler Edelstahl: 1870-1970. Wien, Gebr. Böhler u. Co. AG, 1970
- Bundesgesetz vom 26. Juli 1946 über die Verstaatlichung von Unternehmungen (Verstaatlichungsgesetz) (in German). July 26, 1946.
