= Voest-Alpine (disambiguation) =

Voest-Alpine may refer to:

- voestalpine AG (renamed 2001), Austrian steel company, or its predecessors, divisions or subsidiaries:
- Vöest-Alpine AG, Austrian steel company formed in the 1970s from the merger of VÖEST and Österreichisch-Alpine Montangesellschaft
- Voest-Alpine Stahl AG, Austrian steel company formed 1988 from restructuring of nationalised Austrian steelmakers
- Voest-Alpine Technologie AG, steel technology company formed 1993 from a split of the holdings of Österreichische Industrieholding AG, acquired by Siemens 2005
- Voest-Alpine Industrieanlagenbau (VAI), factory/plant building subsidiary of Voest-Alpine, split 1956, now part of Siemens
  - Voest-Alpine Industries, a subsidiary of VAI
- Voest-Alpine Eisenbahnsysteme, which together with Nortrak Railway Supply Ltd. formed VAE Nortrak North America, Inc.
