= Voestalpine Böhler Welding =

Manufacturer of welding consumables

voestalpine Böhler Welding
- Company type: GmbH
- Industry: Welding
- Founded: 1870
- Headquarters: Düsseldorf, Germany
- Key people: Stefan Glanz (CEO), Thomas Platzer (CSO), Thibaut Du Champ(CFO), Bernhard Riegler (COO), Martin Peruzzi (CTO)
- Products: Welding Consumables, Equipment and Accessories
- Number of employees: 2,300

voestalpine Böhler Welding is a manufacturer of welding consumables (joint welding, maintenance, repair and overlay welding and brazing), welding equipment and accessories with headquarters in Düsseldorf. The company owns over 50 subsidiaries in more than 25 countries, 2,300 employees, customers in approximately 150 countries and more than 1,000 distribution partners.

The company is a business segment of the voestalpine AG Metal Engineering Division.

The company offers extensive technical consultation and individual solutions for industrial welding and soldering applications. It has three specialized and dedicated brands for joint welding, maintenance and cladding, and brazing and soldering.

== Brands ==
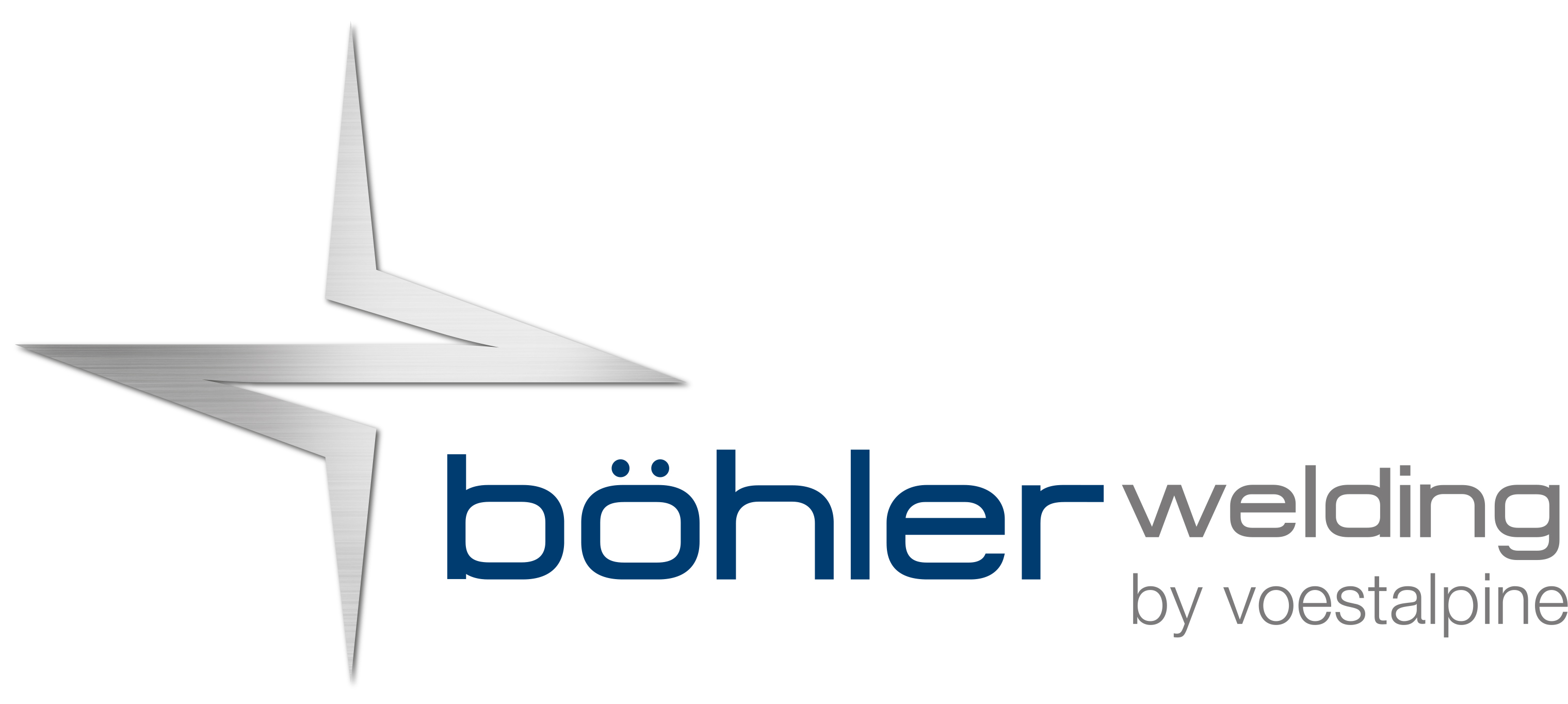
Böhler Welding - Lasting Connections

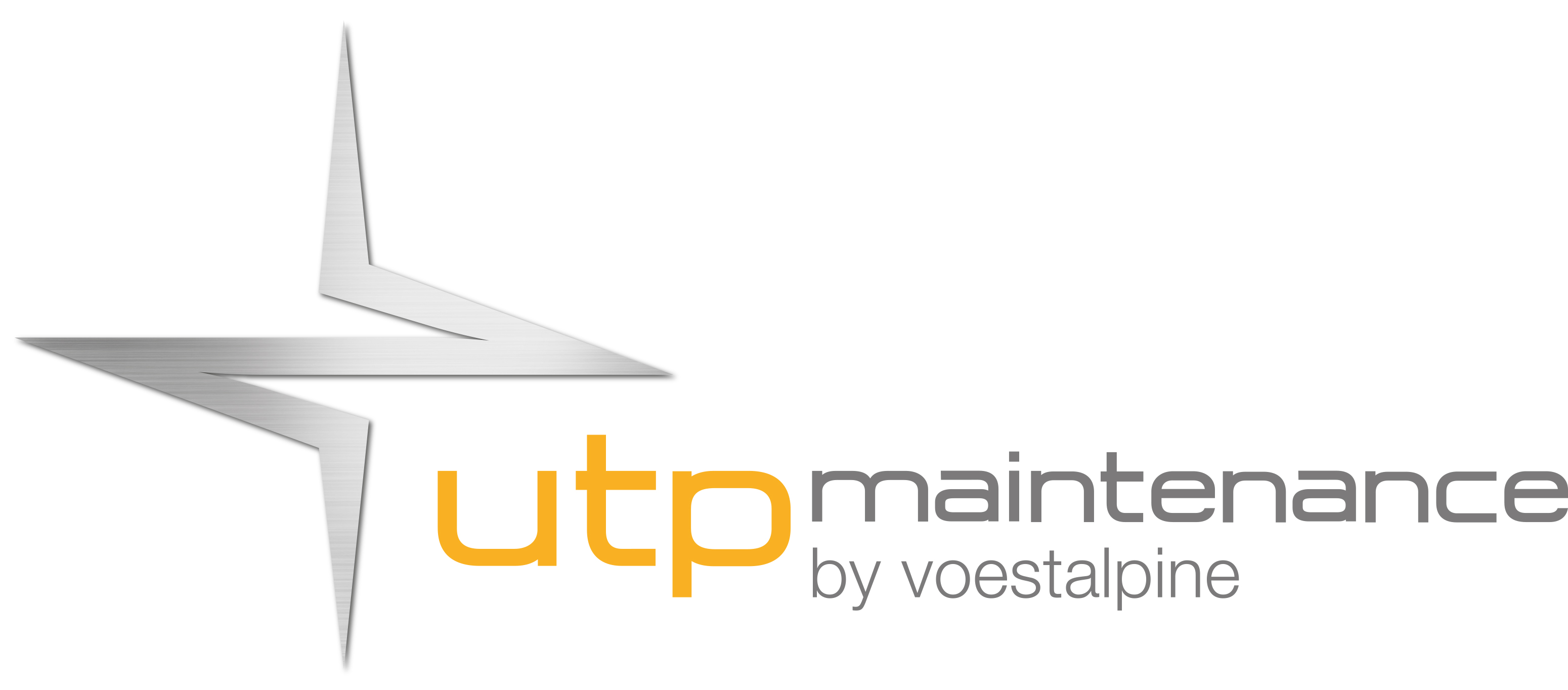
UTP Maintenance - Tailor-Made Protectivity™

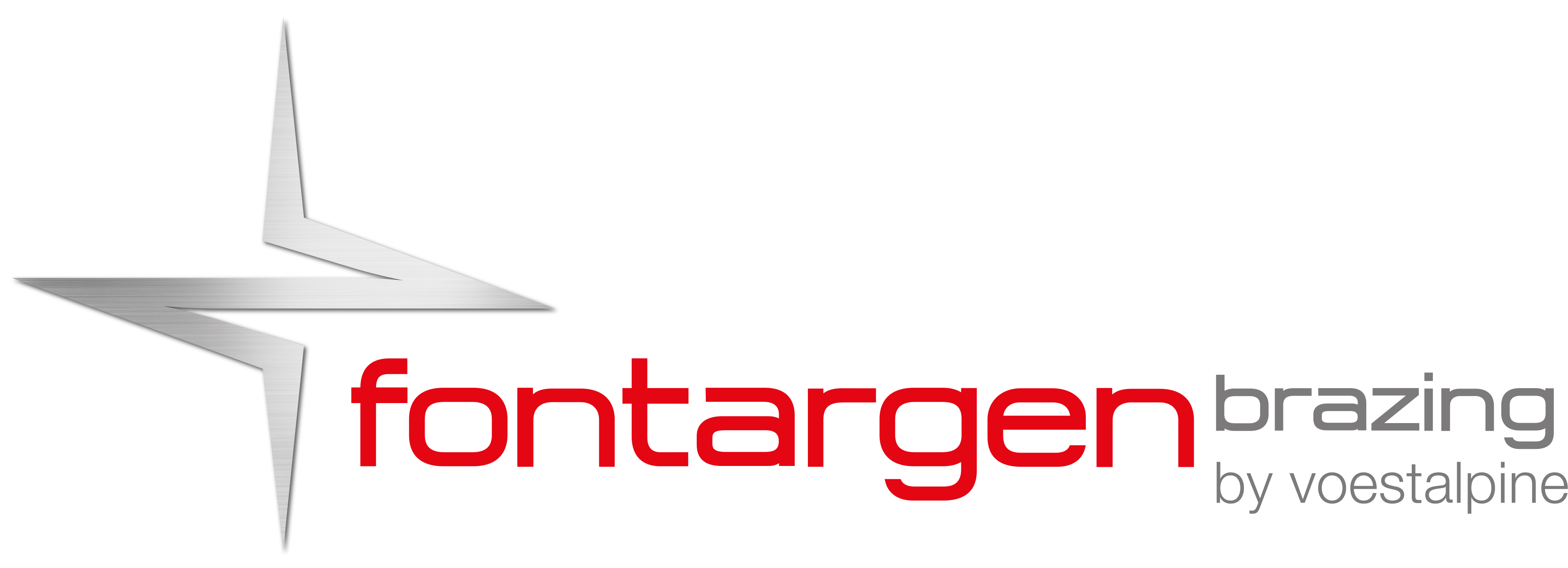
Fontargen Brazing - In-Depth Know-How

- Böhler Welding: 2.000 products for joint welding in all conventional arc welding processes, welding machines and accessories
- UTP Maintenance: Repair, wear and surface protection, welding accessories
- Fontargen Brazing: Brazing and soldering solutions

== History ==
- 1870 Founding of Böhler & CO in Vienna by the Böhler brothers Emil and Albert Böhler.
- 1991 Böhler Welding becomes a separate division in the newly formed Böhler-Uddeholm and acquires UTP.
- 1996 Böhler-Uddeholm and Thyssen merge their welding businesses into the joint venture Böhler Thyssen Welding (Böhler with UTP / Thyssen with Soudokay, Hilarius and Fontargen). *2003 Böhler-Uddeholm acquires 100% of joint venture Böhler Thyssen Welding.
- 2004 Thyssen Welding Consumables (Thermanit, Phoenix, Union) renamed into brand T-PUT.
- 2005 Böhler-Uddeholm acquires Avesta Welding.
- 2007 voestalpine acquires Böhler-Uddeholm and division Böhler Thyssen Welding renamed Böhler Welding Group.
- 2010 Böhler Welding Group switched from Böhler-Uddeholm to voestalpine Metal Engineering (formerly Railway Systems) as a separate division.
- 2013 Integration into the voestalpine Group as part of the Metal Engineering Division. Renamed voestalpine Böhler Welding, and product brands simplified to: Böhler Welding, UTP Maintenance and Fontargen Brazing.
- 2019 product launch of Terra & Uranos welding equipment product lines.
- 2020 voestalpine Böhler Welding acquires a majority stake in Selco s.r.l., a long-standing Italian producer of welding machines.
- 2020 voestalpine Böhler Welding and Afrox Ltd. form Joint Venture for the manufacture of welding consumables

== Products ==
- Stick electrodes
- TIG rods
- Cored wires
- MIG/MAG solid wires
- SAW fluxes
- Welding machines
- Welding accessories
- Equipment
- Personal Protection
- Finishing Chemicals
- Brazing filler metals
- Brazing pastes, preforms, foils
- Thermal spraying powders, PTA powders

Alloys

- Unalloyed, low-alloyed
- Aluminum
- Nickel-base alloy
- Special alloy (Nickel, Copper, Cobalt)
- Stainless steel
- High-strength steel
- High/low temperature
- Corrosion resistant
- Heat resistant
