= Sverker 21 =

Sverker 21 is a tool steel manufactured by Uddeholms AB. It is primarily used for Cold Work applications such as blanking, piercing, cropping, bending, forming and cutting. It's a proprietary equivalent to D2 [tool steel].

== International standards comparison chart ==
Grade name	AISI (USA)	BS4659 (GB)	W.-Nr. (Germany)	SS (Sweden)	JIS (Japan)
Sverker 21	D2	BD2	1.2379	2310	SKD 11

== Chemical composition ==
Grade name	C	Si	Mn	Cr	Mo	Ni	V	S
Sverker 21	1.55	0.3	0.4	11.8	0.8	-	0.8	-

== Properties ==
Sverker 21 is characterized by high compressive strength, high surface hardness after hardening, good though-hardening properties and high wear resistance (abrasive type of wear profile). These characteristics combine to give a steel suitable for the manufacture of medium run tooling for applications where abrasive wear is dominant and the risk of chipping or cracking is not so high, e.g. for blanking and forming of thinner, harder work materials.

== Application areas ==
It is a 12% chromium steel suitable for medium production volume tooling where the production materials cause abrasive wear and the risk of chipping is not so high.

== Other Uddeholm Cold Work Steels ==
Arne, Caldie, Calmax, Rigor, Sleipner, Sverker 3, Unimax, Vanadis 4 Extra, Vanadis 6, Vanadis 10, Vanadis 23, Vancron 40, UHB 11, Formax, Holdax,
