= Österreichische Beteiligungs AG =

Sovereign wealth fund of the Republic of Austria

- Romanized name: Austria Holding PLC
- Company type: Aktiengesellschaft
- Industry: Sovereign wealth fund
- Founded: 1967; 58 years ago
- Headquarters: Vienna, Austria
- Key people: Edith Hlawati (CEO); Günther Ofner (Chairman of the supervisory board)
- Owner: Republic of Austria
- Website: www.oebag.gv.at

The Österreichische Beteiligungs AG (ÖBAG; English: Austria Holding PLC) is an Austrian state-owned holding company that can be characterized as a sovereign wealth fund. It administers the investments of the Republic of Austria in partially or entirely nationalized companies. It is headquartered in Vienna.

== History ==
In 1967, the Österreichische Industrieverwaltungs-GmbH (Austrian industry administration GmbH) was established to centralize the administration of the interests in nationalized companies. It was transformed to the Österreichische Industrieverwaltungs-AG (Austrian industry administration AG) in 1970 and at the same instant got assigned the shares of the nationalized companies. The ÖIAG (since 1986) and the companies it owned formed a group (the Austrian Industries AG) until 1993, when this group was split and the ÖIAG was instructed to privatize the companies it owned.

In 2015, the Austrian state holding ÖIAG was turned into a limited liability company (GesmbH) called Österreichische Bundes- und Industriebeteiligungsholding (ÖBIB), which was permitted to make new acquisitions and which reported directly to the Ministry of Finance. In 2018, the ÖBIB was reorganized into a public limited company again, called Österreichische Beteiligungs AG (ÖBAG).

== Investments ==
The ÖBAG holds shares in:

- 100.00% of the BIG
- 52.85% of the Österreichische Post
- 51.00% of the Verbund
- 33.24% of the Casinos Austria
- 32.97% of the APK Pensionskasse, an Austrian pension fund
- 31.50% of the Oil producer OMV
- 28.42% of the A1 Telekom Austria Group
- 100.00% of the GKB Bergbau GmbH, a mining holding
- 100.00% of the Finanzmarkt Beteiligungs AG (FIMBAG) in Liquidation
- 100% of the Schoeller-Bleckmann steel mill

Severe protests from politicians, unions and workers' councils were the results of the privatisation of some of the ÖBAG’s former investments. Former investments were:

- voestalpine
- Austrian Airlines
- SGP Verkehrstechnik
- Austria Mikro Systeme International AG
- Austria Technologie & Systemtechnik AG (AT & S)
- Austria Metall AG (AMAG)
- Berndorf (1957 merged with AMAG, in 1984 split again)
- Böhler-Uddeholm
- Österreichische Salinen
- Austria Tabak AG
- The auction house Dorotheum
- Österreichische Staatsdruckerei (federal printing plant)
- Flughafen Wien AG (Vienna International Airport)
- Schoeller-Bleckmann
- Siemens AG Österreich
- VA Technologie AG (VA Tech)
