= UTP Schweissmaterial =

German manufacturing company

- Industry: Manufacturing
- Founded: 1953
- Headquarters: Bad Krozingen

UTP Schweissmaterial GmbH is a traditional German company manufacturing welding consumables and based in Bad Krozingen. The enterprise was established in 1953 at Freiburg im Breisgau.

The company supplies consumables both directly and via a sales network of 70 of its own and alliance partners in several countries. Production facilities were built between 1956 and 1969 in Switzerland, France, Mexico and Brazil.

== History ==
In 1977 UTP was the first European manufacturer of welding consumables to gain ASME and VdTüV approval. In 1978 production was started in Mostar. In 1991, UTP was taken over by Böhler Schweißtechnik Austria GmbH (a subsidiary of Böhler-Uddeholm AG). In 1996, establishment of a joint venture between Böhler Schweißtechnik and Thyssen Schweißtechnik (each company with a half share) and establishment of Böhler Thyssen Schweißtechnik. In 2003, Böhler-Uddeholm AG became sole owner of Böhler Thyssen Schweißtechnik. In 2007, Böhler Thyssen Schweisstechnik was transformed into the Böhler Welding Group. In 2007, Voestalpine AG acquired a majority shareholding in Böhler Uddeholm AG and retained it as an independent division.
