= Caldie =

Type of tool steel

Caldie is a chromium-molybdenum-vanadium alloyed tool steel manufactured by Uddeholms AB. It is intended for cold work processes, such as blanking and piercing, applied to difficult materials such as advanced high strength steel, where compressive strength and chipping and cracking resistance are important.

== Composition ==
The steel's composition is

C	Si	Mn	Cr	Mo	Ni	V	S
0.7	0.2	0.5	5.0	2.3	-	0.5	-

== Properties ==
Uddeholm Caldie is characterized by:

- Very good chipping and cracking resistance
- Good wear resistance
- High hardness (>60 HRC) after high temperature tempering
- Good dimensional stability in heat treatment and in service
- Excellent through-hardening properties
- Good machinability and grindability
- Excellent polishability
- Good surface treatment properties
- Good resistance to tempering back
- Very good WEDM properties

== Application areas ==
Uddeholm Caldie is suitable for short to medium run tooling where chipping and/or cracking are the predominant failure mechanisms and where a high compressive strength (hardness of over 60 HRC) is necessary. This makes Uddeholm Caldie very suitable for severe cold work applications where the combination of a hardness above 60 HRC and a high cracking resistance is of utmost importance e.g. as in the blanking and forming of ultra high strength steel sheets. Uddeholm Caldie is also very suitable as a substrate steel for applications where surface coatings are desirable or necessary.

- Blanking applications where high ductility and toughness are needed to prevent chipping/cracking
- Cold forging and forming operations where a high compressive strength combined with good resistance to chipping/cracking are necessary
- Machine knives
- Thread rolling dies
- Substrate for surface coatings

This steel can be used in engineering applications where high compressive strength has to be combined with high ductility/toughness. Knives for fragmentation of plastics and metals and roll forming rolls are good examples

== See also ==
- Other Uddeholm Cold Work Steels:
  - Arne,
  - Calmax,
  - Rigor,
  - Sleipner,
  - Sverker 3,
  - Sverker 21,
  - Unimax,
  - Vanadis 4 Extra,
  - Vanadis 6,
  - Vanadis 10,
  - Vanadis 23,
  - Vancron 40,
  - UHB 11,
  - Formax,
  - Holdax,
