= Złomrex =

Polish producer of steel

Złomrex S.A. is a major producer of steel and steel products and the largest scrap supplier in Poland. Złomrex Group income for 2007 was 3.37 milliard złoty, and net profit was 205.8 million złoty. The company is a member of Polska Unia Dystrybutorów Stali (Polish Association of Steel Stockholders) and Izba Przemysłowo-Handlowa Gospodarki Złomem (Scrap Management Industrial and Commercial Chamber).

== Business units ==
Złomrex Capital Group, with almost 4000 employees, consists of three divisions—the Raw Materials Division, the Production Division, and the Distribution Division—plus other entities.

In the Raw Materials Division, Złomrex Metal Sp. z o.o., headquartered in Poraj and established in 2007, provides raw materials to Złomrex Group plants. AB Stahl AG, began in 2006, transports scrap as well as reinforcing and structural steel. Nowa Jakość Organizacja Odzysku S.A., started in 2004, collects recyclable waste materials from other companies.

In the Production Division, Ferrostal Łabędy Sp. z o.o. makes steel and other metallurgical products. HSW - Huta Stali Jakościowych S.A. (Quality Steel Steelworks) makes long and flat hot-rolled steel products, and HSW - Tlenownia makes tonnage oxygen and compressed air. Odlewnia Metali Szopienice Sp. z o.o. (Szopienice Metal Foundry) makes products using copper and zinc alloys.

The Distribution Division, operating in nine European countries as Cognor Group, consists of companies belonging to Cognor S.A. in Katowice, Stalexport S.A. Group, and Cognor Stahlhandel GmbH (formerly Voestalpine Stahlhandel), based in Linz, Austria.

Other entities include Złomrex Centrum Sp. z o.o., Kapitał Sp. z o.o, Kapitał Sp. z o.o. Sp. komandytowa (construction)., CKM Złomrex Włókniarz S.A., Złomrex-Finans Sp. z o.o., Fundacja Zdążyć na Czas, and Business Support Services Sp. z o.o.

== History ==
Złomrex Przedsiębiorstwo Obrotu Surowcami Wtórnymi (Recyclable Materials Trading Enterprise) began July 9, 1990 as a producer of "non-ferrous metal scrap".

In 1999, Złomrex-Finans Sp. Z o.o. was established.

In 2001, Złomrex purchased ZW Walcownia Bruzdowa Sp. z o.o. (Bruzdowa Rolling Mill) in Zawiercie.

During 2002 and 2003, Złomrex POSW became a limited liability company.

During 2004, Złomrex bought shares of Ferrostal Łabędy and Odlewnia Metali Szopienice (Szopienice Metal Foundry), and Nowa Jakość - Organizacja Odzysku S.A. (New Quality - Organization of Recovery joint stock company) was established.

In 2005, Centrostal Górnośląski Sp. z o.o. was established. The company later changed its name to Cognor S.A.

In 2006, shares of Kapitał, Huta Stali Jakościowych Sp. z o.o. (Quality Steel Steelworks limited liability company) and POWH Centrostal were purchased. Also, Złomrex International Finance and CKM Włókniar were established.

In 2007, shares of Voestalpine Stahlhandel GmbH, Florian Podkarpacie, Željezara Split of Croatia, and Stalexport S.A. were purchased and Złomrex Steel Services was established. HSW - Huta Stali Jakościowych purchased shares of HSW - Tlenownia (Oxygen) Generating Plant).
