= Robert Durrer =

Swiss engineer (1890–1978)

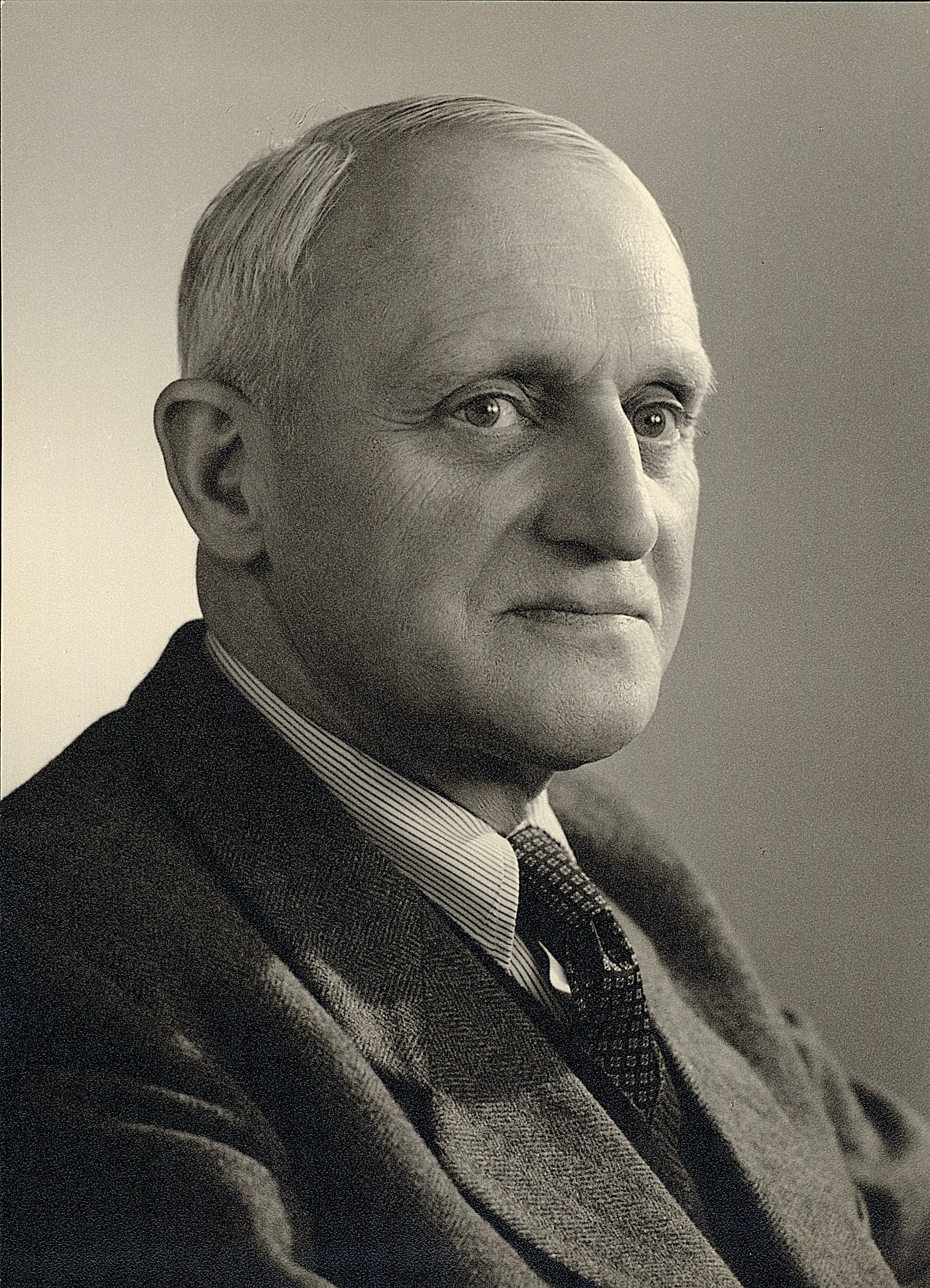
- Robert Durrer (c. 1950)
- Born: 1890
- Died: 1978 (aged 87–88)

Robert Durrer (1890–1978) was a Swiss engineer who invented the basic oxygen steelmaking process (the Linz-Donawitz process, named after the towns where the technology was commercialized). The process was successfully tested by Durrer in 1948. A team led by Dr Theodor Eduard Suess in Austria adapted the process and scaled it to industrial size, after which it was commercialized by VÖEST and ÖAMG.

== Career ==
Durrer graduated from the Royal Technical University of Aachen in 1915. He stayed in Germany and in 1928 accepted the chair of the Professor of Metallurgy at the Technische Universität Berlin. From 1933 to 1939, during his time in Berlin, Durrer supervised experiments on the new steel making technique. In 1943 Durrer returned to Switzerland and was appointed to the board of von Roll AG, the country's largest steelmaker. Durrer teamed up with Heinrich Heilbrugge and ran a series of experiments which established the commercial viability of basic oxygen metallurgy. In 1947 Durrer ordered a small experimental converter from the United States, and on 1 April 1948 Durrer and Heilbrugge produced their first oxygen-blown steel.

In the summer of 1948 von Roll AG and two Austrian state-owned companies, VÖEST and ÖAMG, agreed to commercialize the Durrer process. Their commercial converter furnaces were put into operation in November 1952 (VÖEST in Linz) and May 1953 (ÖAMG, Donawitz) and temporarily became the leading edge of the world's steelmaking, causing a surge in steel-related research. Unlike Europe, whose industrial capacity had been decimated by World War II, America had a large base of steelmaking capacity, and it was economic to retain, rather than replace, its capital stock. U.S. Steel and Bethlehem Steel nonetheless introduced oxygen steelmaking in 1964; by 1969, its tonnage surpassed that manufactured using the Bessemer process. Japan became an early adopter and by 1970 produced 80% of its steel in Linz-Donawitz furnaces.

Durrer was a professor at ETH Zurich from 1943 to 1961. He edited and co-authored the multi-volume Metallurgie des Eisens (Metallurgy of Iron, or the "Gmelin-Durrer").

=== Selected patents ===
- US 1752374A
- US 3079247A
- GB 293326A
- GB 291717A
- CA 615548A
- DE 395775C
- DE 399749C

== Honors and awards ==
Durrer's contribution to practical steelmaking was marked by the AIME Benjamin F. Fairless Award in 1966. etc.

He was awarded the Bessemer Gold Medal by the British Iron and Steel Institute in 1957 and the Rinman Medal by the Swedish iron and steel industry in 1959.

The annual Staudinger-Durrer Prize awarded by ETH Zurich commemorates Durrer along with Nobel Prize winner Hermann Staudinger.
