= Uddeholms AB =

Multinational steel producer

- Company type: Privately held company
- Industry: Steel production
- Headquarters: Hagfors, Sweden
- Key people: Pär Emanuelsson, CEO; Franz Rotter, Chairman of the Board
- Products: Tool Steel
- Revenue: 305,000,000 ±1000000 euro (2017)
- Owner: voestalpine AG
- Number of employees: 800
- Parent: Böhler-Uddeholm AG
- Website: Uddeholm.com

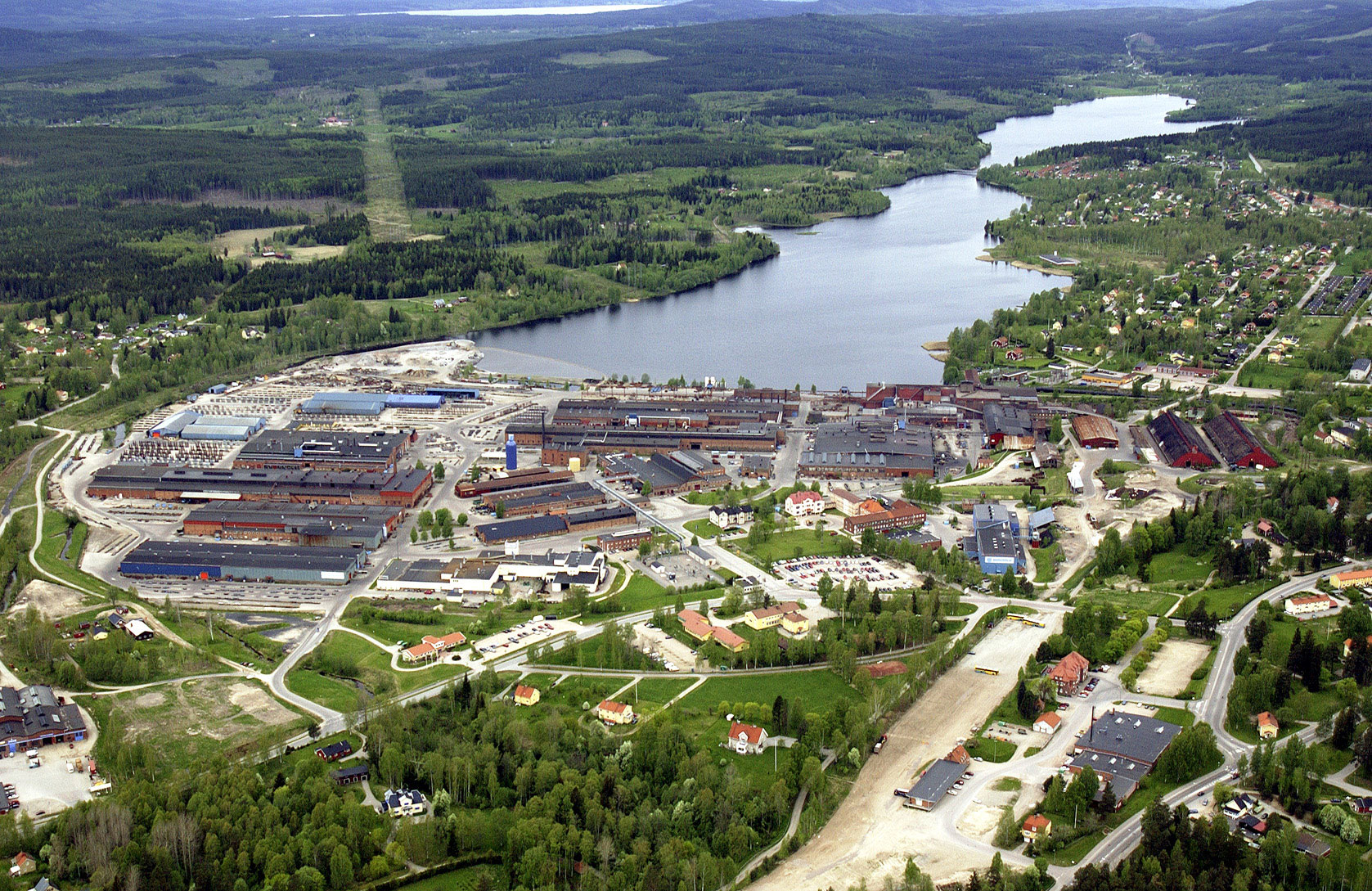
Hagfors Järnverk (Iron mill), Hagfors, Sweden

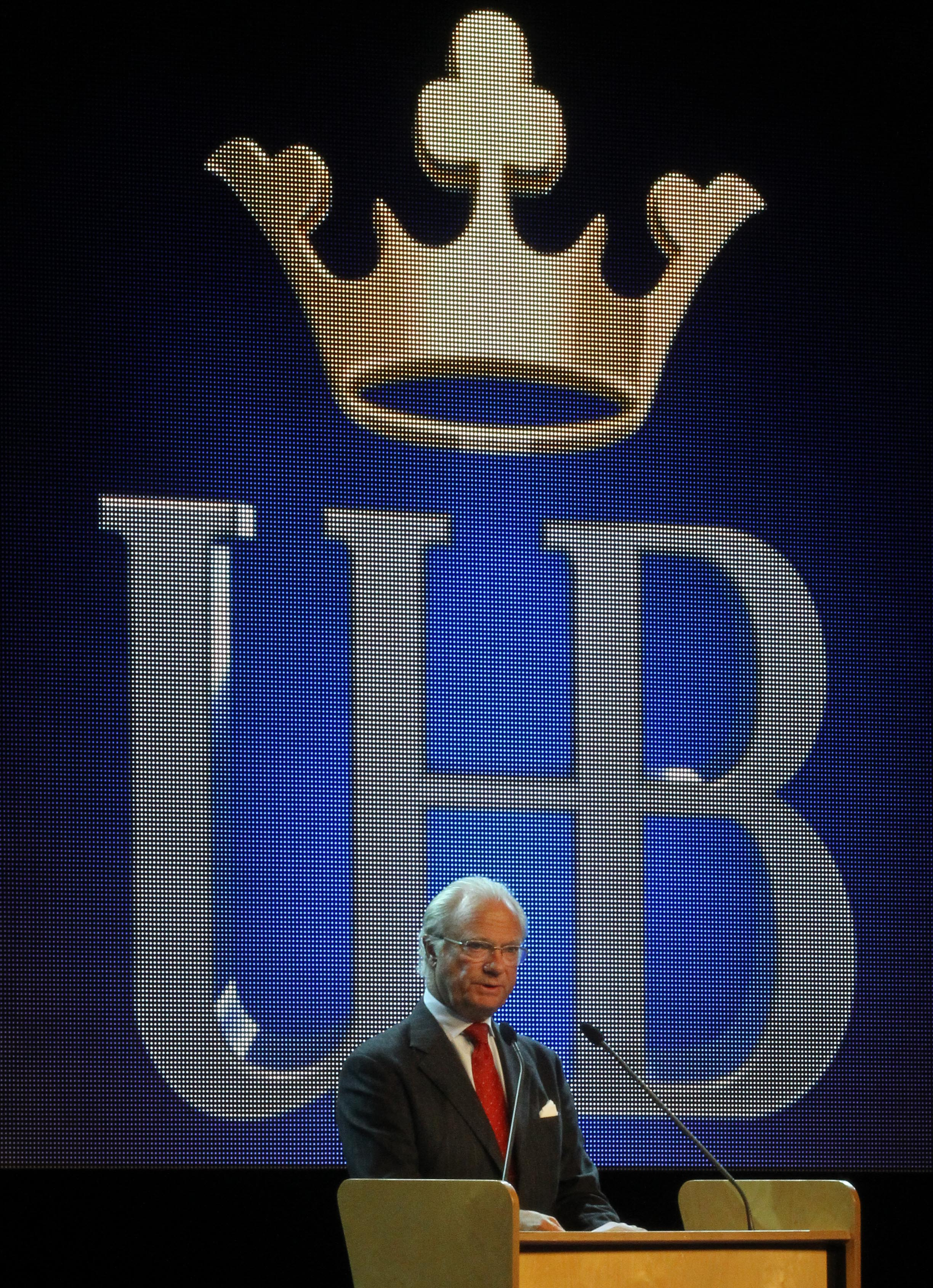
King Carl XVI Gustav inaugurates the new forging mill in Hagfors, Sweden 8 September 2010.

Uddeholms AB is a multinational producer of high alloyed tool steel with production in Hagfors, Sweden. Since 1991, the company is part of the Austrian Böhler-Uddeholm group which in turn is part of the voestalpine AG group since 2007. Uddeholms AB has 800 Swedish and 3,000 total employees.

== History ==
The company was founded in 1668 by Bengt Gustaf Geijer. The company was then privately held until 1870 when it became a public company named Uddeholms AB. During the second half of the 19th century, the company introduced electricity and railways to their production. The Uddeholm railway was the first private railway in Sweden and also one of the first to be electrified in 1920.

The company was introduced to the United States in the 1830s and in the 1920s a modern international sales organization was created. In 1945, Associated Swedish Steel was created together with four other major Swedish steel producers to sell steel to the new markets in South America, Africa, Middle East and Asia. In 1976, Uddeholm bought the whole of ASSAB and since 1 April 2011, it is fully integrated in Uddeholms AB with the exception of ASSAB Pacific Pte Ltd.

== Production ==
Uddeholms AB's production plant is Hagfors Järnverk (Hagfors Iron mill) in Hagfors, Sweden. There are three production routes. In every route except granulation, the materials are heat treated and machined.

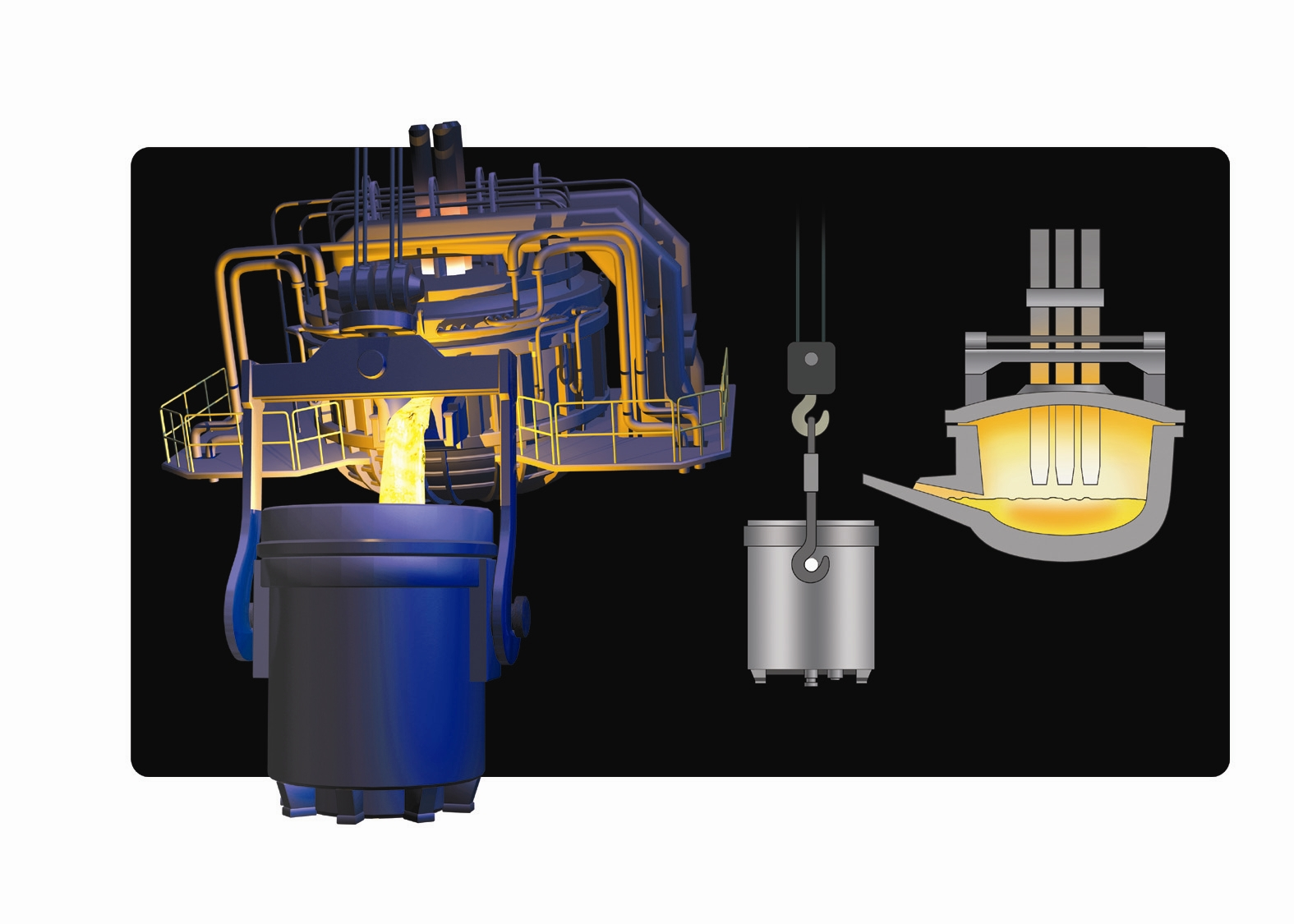
Melting of steel scrap in an Electric arc furnace

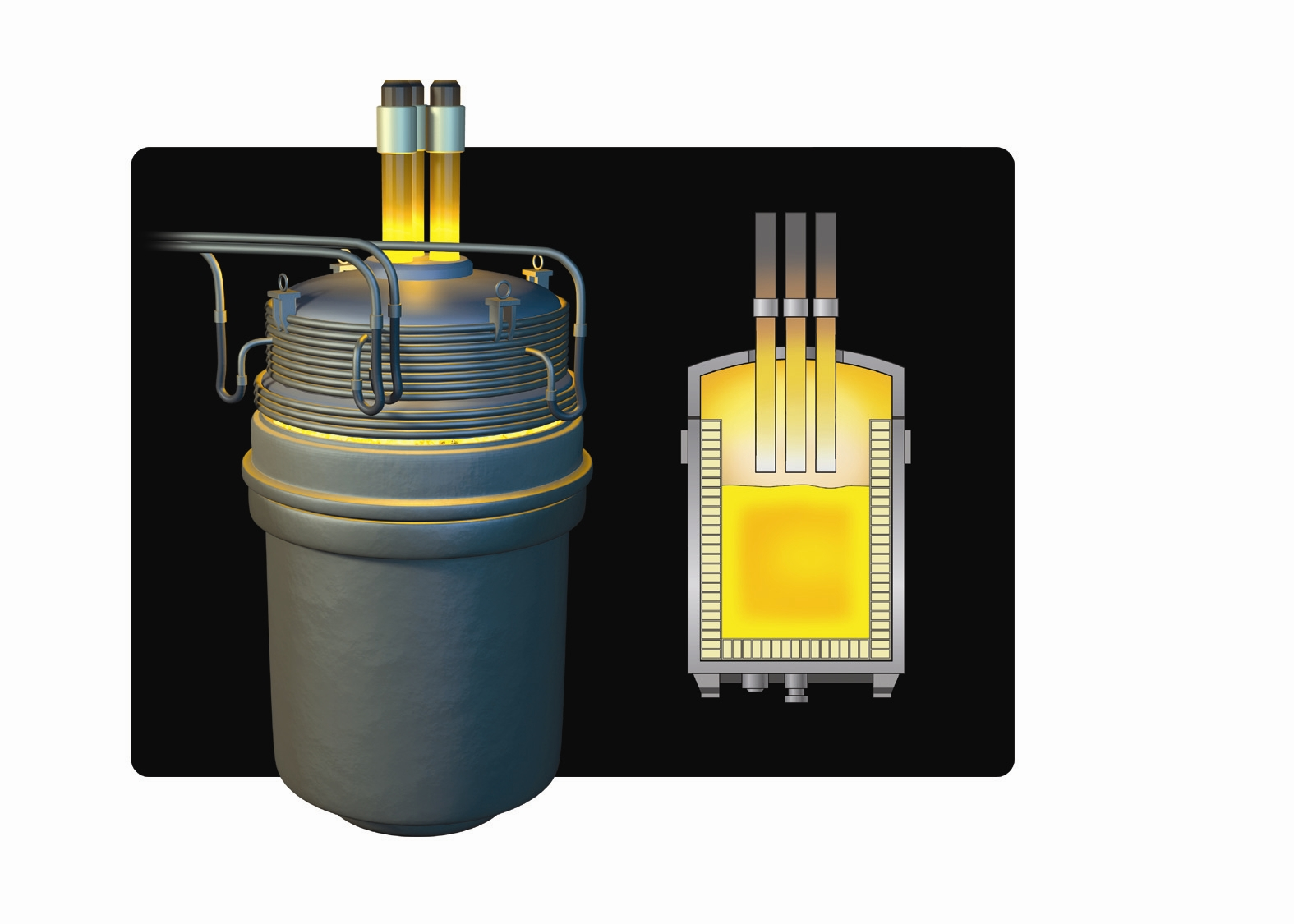
Purification of tool steel in ladle

Uphill casting

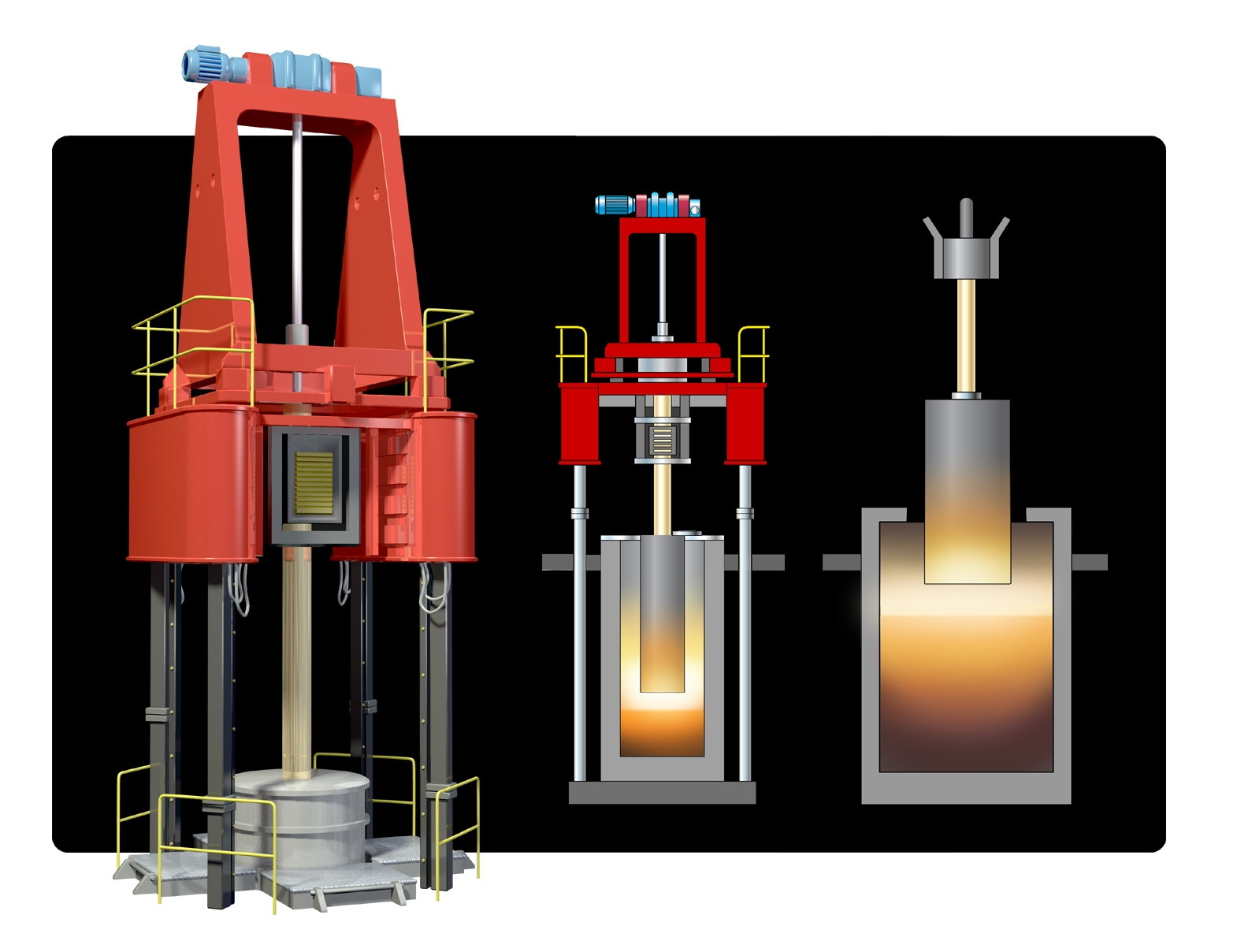
ESR-remelting

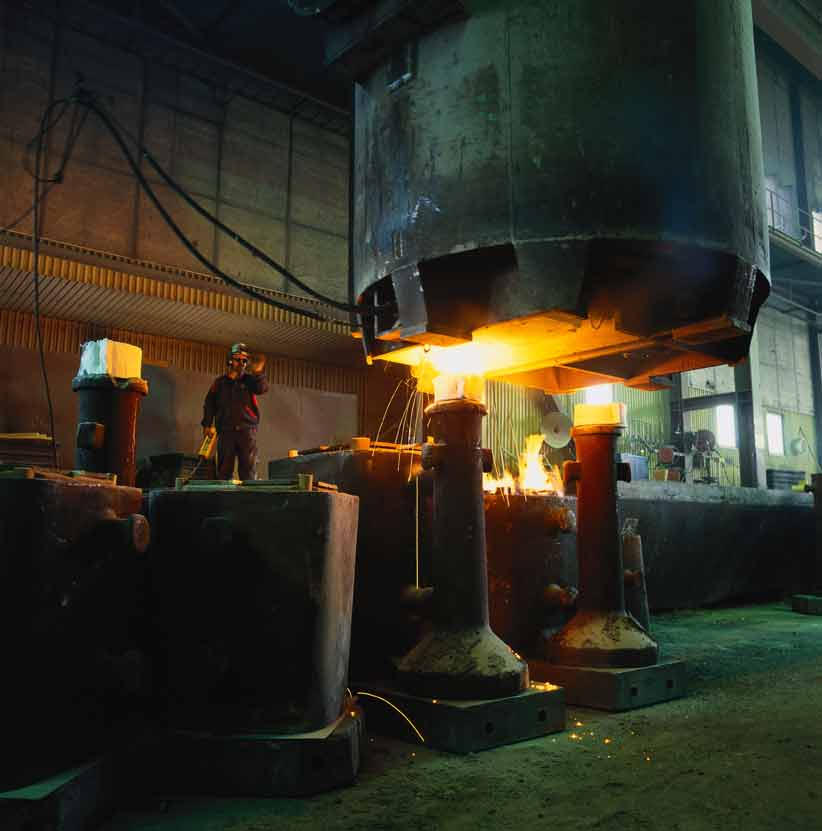
Ingot casting

=== Conventional ===
This type of production has three phases. First, steel scrap is melted in an Electric Arc Furnace. After melting, the steel is purified in a secondary treatment to remove sulfur, slag and other unwanted materials. In the third step, the steel is poured into an ingot. Different methods such as Up-hill casting and the use of protective noble gases can further improve quality.

=== Electro-slag remelting (ESR) ===
In the electro-slag remelting (ESR) process, steel scrap is first melted using the conventional process but is then remelted in a water-cooled form. With this process, a more even microstructure can be achieved which gives completely different properties than a material produced with the conventional method. There are different variants of the electro-slag remelting process where the remelting is done in vacuum or a protective atmosphere.

=== Powder metallurgy ===
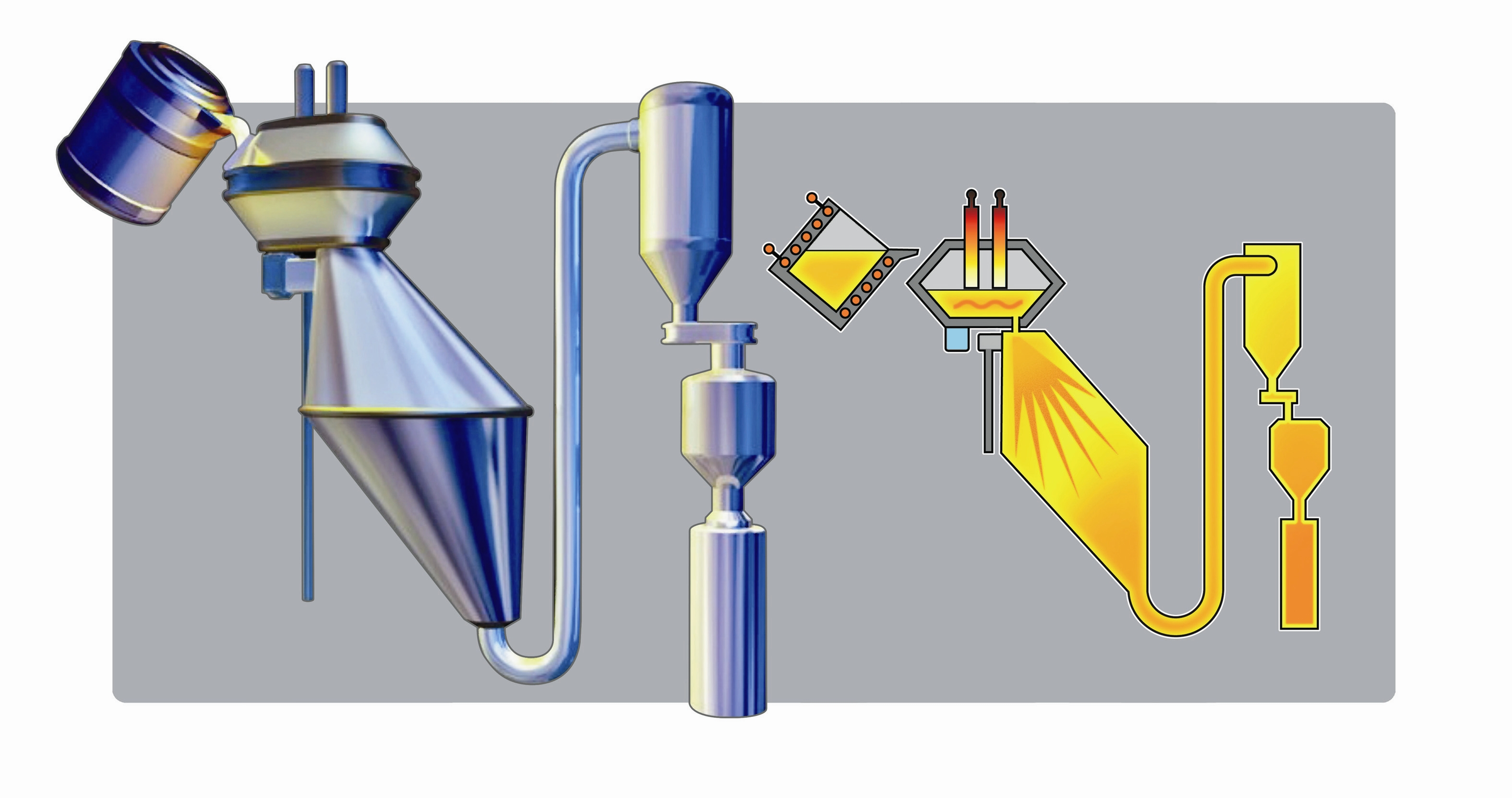
Production process for powder metallurgical capsules

In the powder metallurgical process, a fine powder is created by spraying a stream of liquid steel with nitrogen under high pressure. The average diameter of the powder is 50-100 μm. The powder is filled into capsules directly in order to avoid contamination. With hot isostatic pressing (HIP), the powder is consolidated to 100% density. The advantage with powder metallurgical tool steels is to have a high degree of alloys without getting segregations in the material. This makes it possible to combine high material hardness with wear resistance.

=== Metal granulation – Granshot ===
The Granshot process was developed at Uddeholm. In the Granshot process, hot liquid molten metal is poured at a flat surface, dispersing it so that small droplets are created. These metal droplets are immediately cooled in water, creating granules which are dewatered. The process is applicable to iron, steel, stainless steel, ferro alloys and base metals. These granules have ideal metallurgical and logistical properties as to facilitate the use of granules into blast furnaces, electric arc furnaces, AODs, foundries etc. For example, the granules can be used in casting of tools in order to achieve tools with even metallurgical properties. In 2007, the independent and privately owned Swedish engineering company UHT - Uvån Hagfors Teknologi AB, was formed and also took over all intellectual property rights including the trademark Granshot. Uddeholm has continued to produce metal granulates, so called Granshots, using their Granshot unit in Hagfors, Sweden.

== Products ==
Uddeholms AB manufacture and refine high alloyed tool steels in long and flat dimensions. Tool steels are mainly used in tools such as molds, knives, tools that are used for manufacturing of different products. Tool steels are used in all manufacturing industries such as automotive, electronics, consumer goods and packaging. Due to their special metallurgical properties, e.g.combinations of hardness, wear resistance, toughness, corrosion resistance, they can also be used for mechanical applications instead of engineering steels.

=== Cold Work Steels ===
Cold Work Steels are tool steels used for tools where the work material is cold. The steel is exposed to mechanical forces by the work material. Common problems are wear, chipping, plastic deformation and cracking which can lead to tool failure. Application areas are stamping, deep drawing, cold extrusion, fine blanking, cold forging, form pressing and rolling.

=== Hot Work Steels ===
Hot Work Steels are tool steels that are used for tools where the material is hot. Due to the high temperatures when working with molten metals such as aluminium, iron and brass, the requirements on the tools are very high. High heat resistance and ductility as well as wear resistance are important. Resistance to thermal cyclic stress is also good. Application areas are casting, extrusion and forging.

=== Plastic Mold Steel ===
Plastic Mold Steels are tool steels used for production of plastic parts. The most important characteristics are durability and hardness, toughness, wear resistance, polishability, corrosion resistance, and thermal heat conductivity. Important customer groups are in the automotive, consumer goods industry, electronics and other industries that use plastic components. Application areas are blow molding, form pressing, form blowing, extrusion and holder materials.

=== Mechanical components/Mechanical engineering ===
Mechanical components such as engine parts (shafts cog wheels), machine parts, wear parts can be made of tool steel. The combinations of hardness, toughness, corrosion resistance and other properties of tool steels, makes it possible to replace more traditional engineering steels.

== Reference to international tool steel standards ==
-
Grade/Standard	W.Nr. (Germany)	AISI (United States)	IHA	UNE (Spain)	SS (Sweden)	JIS (Japan)
Alumec						
Uddeholm Alvar 14	1.2714		F-520/F-528	F5307		
Uddeholm Alvar	1.2329					
Uddeholm Arne	1.2510	O1	F-522	F-5220	2140	SKS 3
Uddeholm Caldie						
Uddeholm Calmax	1.2358					
Uddeholm Chipper/Viking						
Uddeholm Corrax						
Uddeholm Dievar						
Uddeholm Elmax						
Uddeholm Fermo						
Uddeholm Formax					2172	
Uddeholm Grane					2550	
Uddeholm Holdax	1.2312		F-5304			
Uddeholm Hotvar						
Uddeholm Impax Supreme	1.2738	P20 mod.		F-5303		
Uddeholm Mirrax ESR		420 mod.				SUS 420 mod.
Moldmax HH						
Moldmax XL						
Uddeholm Nimax						
Uddeholm Orvar 2 Microdized	1.2344	H13 premium		F-5318	2242	SKD 61
Uddeholm Orvar Supreme	1.2344	H13 premium		F-5318	2242	SKD 61
Uddeholm Orvar Superior	1.2344	H13 premium		F-5318		SKD 61
Uddeholm Polmax	(1.2083)	420 mod.	F-312	F-5263	2314	SKD 61
Uddeholm QRO 90 Supreme						
Uddeholm Ramax HH		(420F)				
Uddeholm Ramax LH		(420F)				
Uddeholm Rigor	1.2363	A2		F-5227	2260	SKD 12
Uddeholm Sleipner						
Uddeholm SR 1855	(1.2108)				2092	
Uddeholm Stavax ESR	(1.2083)	420 mod.	F-312	F-5263	2314	SUS 420
Uddeholm Sverker 21	1.2379	(D6)	F-52OR	F-5211	2310	SKD 11
Uddeholm Sverker 3	1.2436	D2	F-5213		2312	(SKD 2)
Uddeholm THG 2000						
Uddeholm UHB 11	1.1730	1148		F-1142	1650/1672	
Uddeholm Unimax			F-114			
Uddeholm Vanadis 4 Extra						
Uddeholm Vanadis 6						
Uddeholm Vanadis 10						
Uddeholm Vanadis 23	1.3344	M3:2			2725	
Uddeholm Vanadis 30		M3:2+Co			2726	
Uddeholm Vanadis 60					2727	
Uddeholm Vancron 40						
Uddeholm Vidar 1	1.2343	H11				
Uddeholm Vidar 1 ESR	1.2343	H11				
Uddeholm Vidar	Superior 1.2340(1.2343)	(H11)				(SKD 6)

== Other ==
=== Sponsoring and local engagements ===
Between 2002 and 2008, Uddeolms AB was name sponsor for the WRC Swedish Rally.
