= Primetals Technologies =

British metals industry company

Primetals Technologies Limited
- Brand logo for Primetals Technologies
- Type: Limited Company
- Industry: Metallurgy
- Founded: 2015; 11 years ago, a Group Company of Mitsubishi Heavy Industries
- Headquarters: London, UK
- Key people: Koji Sakatani (CEO, CFO); Hideshi Yoshizaki (COO, CSO); Alexander Fleischanderl (CTO)
- Products: Metallurgy and Rolling mill technology
- Number of employees: Approx. 7,000
- Website: primetals.com

Primetals Technologies Limited is an engineering and plant construction company headquartered in London, United Kingdom, with numerous locations worldwide. It serves clients in the metals industry, both the ferrous and the nonferrous metals sector. It was established as a joint venture between Siemens VAI Metals Technologies and Mitsubishi-Hitachi Metals Machinery in 2015. As of 2020, Primetals Technologies is a joint venture of Mitsubishi Heavy Industries and partners.

== Overview ==
=== Operations ===
Primetals Technologies operates as a full liner, i.e., a comprehensive supplier for the metals industry. Their portfolio covers all aspects of the iron and steel production process and includes several nonferrous metals technologies, as well as comprehensive metallurgical services. These processes include but are not limited to beneficiation, direct reduction, oxygen steelmaking, electric steelmaking, continuous casting, hot and cold rolling, and processing. They are also active in the digitalization of various aspects of the metals industry, including improvements in automation technologies, services, increasing the use of artificial intelligence, and increasing the use of robotics to improve the safety of iron and steel works.

==== Green Steel at Primetals Technologies ====
As of May 2022, the formation of a new global task force titled "Green Steel" was announced to combine the competencies in the metals industry with cross-industrial competencies of the larger Mitsubishi Heavy Industries Group. Recognizing the severity of the global climate crisis, the steel industry at large has been recognized as a major contributor of carbon emissions into the atmosphere producing eight percent of global CO_{2} emissions in 2020. With several environmental technologies in their portfolio, Primetals Technologies is at work to help reduce the carbon footprint of the metals industry.

== History ==
=== Mitsubishi-Hitachi Metals Machinery ===
In May 2000, Mitsubishi Heavy Industries and Hitachi announced the establishment of a broad-based partnership in metals rolling mills. In October 2000, a joint venture company, MHI-Hitachi Metals Machinery, Inc. was established to handle sales and related engineering activities of metal rolling mills and downstream facilities. In 2002, the name was changed to Mitsubishi-Hitachi Metals Machinery, Inc. In 2004, Mitsubishi-Hitachi Metals Machinery, Inc. U.S.A. was established.

- 2006 – Acquisition of New Gencoat, Inc., U.S.A
- 2006 – MHMM receives contract for supply of pickling line-tandem cold mill from Shougang Jingtang Inc., China
- 2007 – Mitsubishi-Hitachi Metals Machinery, Inc., China established
- 2010 – Start-up of endless billet-welding and rolling mill at POSCO, South Korea
- 2010 – Founding of Mitsubishi-Hitachi Metals Machinery South Asia Private Ltd.
- 2012 – Start-up of No. 2 Hot-Rolling Mill at Usiminas Cubatão, Brazil
- 2013 – Integration of IHI Metaltech rolling mill business
- 2013 – Mitsubishi-Hitachi Metals Machinery acquires shares in Concast Ltd., India
- 2013 – Acquisition of majority shares of Hasegawa Gear Works, Ltd.

=== Siemens VAI Metals Technologies ===
==== 1938–1955 ====
VAI, whose parent company was VA Technologie AG, began as the plant building operation of Vereinigte Österreichische Eisen und Stahlwerke (VÖEST) but became a separate operation in 1946. In 1938, the American company H.A. Brassert & Co. began the designs for the Reichswerke in Linz before withdrawing in 1939.

At the end of WWII, Austria was occupied by the allied forces, and due to the air raids during the war, all industrial assets were severely damaged. In July 1945, the "Alpine Montan AG Hermann Göring" plant was renamed to "Vereinigte Österreichische Eisen- und Stahlwerke" (VÖEST) (United Austrian Iron and Steel Plants) and separated from the Alpine Mountain AG. The plant was returned to the newly founded Republic of Austria in July 1946 as part of what would become the ÖIAG (Austrian Industries AG). For the plant's reconstruction, Voestalpine used funding from the Marshall Plan. In 1947 the first blast furnace, a Siemens-Martin open hearth furnace, and first coke ovens started production. In 1948, with the launch of the “Iron and Steel Plan,” which allocated the production of flat steel to Linz and the production of long products to Donawitz. This included the production of finished products in a heavy-plate mill and the construction of a new slab and hot-strip mill in Linz.

However, with production based on the open-hearth furnace, the future of flat production in Linz would be too expensive. Therefore, a new manufacturing process, i.e., what would become the Linz-Donawitz-process, began development in 1949 and the patent was applied for in 1950. After construction, two LD-Converters were commissioned, one in 1952 in Linz, and the other in 1953 in Donawitz.

==== 1956–1973 ====
Voest-Alpine Industrieanlagenbau began as a division of VÖEST in 1956.

With the invention of the LD-process and experiences gained from the complete reconstruction after the war, VÖEST, partnered with the Fried. Krupp company in Essen, Germany, began the construction of the first LD steelmaking plant outside Austria in Rourkela, India, in 1958. In 1960, the management of Wiener Brückenbau und Eisenkonstruktions AG (WBB), later renamed Voest-Alpine Hebetechnik- und Brückenbau AG, is transferred to VÖEST. VÖEST continued to expand worldwide and expanded their network of customers to amount to 274 business relationships in 87 countries by 1968. In 1973, the two nationalized iron and steel industries VÖEST and Österreichisch-Alpine Montangesellschaft (Alpine) merged and became Vöest-Alpine AG.

==== 1974–1994 ====
When the oil crisis started in 1973, the metallurgical industry was severely affected in all parts of the world (see also, "steel crisis"). In Austria, this coincided with the creation of Vöest-Alpine AG and between 1974 and 1976 several other companies joined the group, including Gebrüder Böhler & Co AG, Schoeller-Bleckmann Stahlwerke AG, and Steirische Gußstahlwerke AG, making up the "Vereinigte Edelstahlwerke AG (VEW). While the merger of these companies strengthened the position of Vöest-Alpine AG, the impact of the steel crisis led the company to refocus its efforts. In 1977, the group was divided into four divisions: steelworks, processing, finished goods, and industrial plant engineering. In 1978, industrial plant engineering was also under the direct control of the management board.

In the late 1970s, VOEST-ALPINE AG, as VAI, began developing the "COREX process" with Korf Engineering GmbH, originally known as the "KR method." In 1985 the crisis came to a head, and VOEST-ALPINE declared bankruptcy. In fall of 1986, the "Concept for a New VOEST-ALPINE" was introduced along with the establishment of the Österreichische Industrieholding Aktiengesellschaft (ÖIAG).

Finally, in 1988, the Austrian government decided to partially privatize the ÖIAG, forming Voest-Alpine Stahl AG (VA Stahl), while placing Voest-Alpine Industrieanlagenbau (VAI, also VAI-BAU) under Maschinen- und Anlagenbauholding AG.

==== 1995–2014 ====
In 1993, after a restructuring of the ÖIAG group, VA Technologie AG (VA Tech) emerged and became the parent company to VAI. By 1995, VAI operated in 45 countries and had 2000 engineers, with revenue of $841 million.

In 1995, VAI bought its first shares of Fuchs Systems Inc. (Fuchs Systemtechnik GmbH), a German-based manufacturer of electric arc furnaces and other equipment for manufacturing steel, with plants in Mexico and Salisbury, North Carolina. The Salisbury plant had 230 employees in 1997.

As of 1997, ÖIAG owned 24% and Voest-Alpine Stahl owned 19.05% of the stock in VAI's parent VATech. In September 1999, VAI completed its acquisition of the Norwegian-owned Kvaerner A.S.A. metals equipment group, including operations in France, Spain, Italy, Germany, China, India and Great Britain. VAI subsidiary Voest-Alpine Industries Inc. had its American headquarters in Pittsburgh, Pennsylvania. In 1999, Voest-Alpine Industries, part of VA Tech North America, moved all its Pittsburgh operations to Southpointe in Washington County. At the time, the company had just taken over Kværner A.S.A.'s metals equipment group. Voest-Alpine Industries also operated in Eastlake, Ohio, and Benton Harbor, Michigan. The metals automation division of Voest-Alpine Industries relocated from Eastlake to Southpointe in 2002.

As of 1999, Voest-Alpine Industries owned 49 percent of Fuchs. Although the company laid off 59 employees in Salisbury, Fuchs was "the market leader", and the parent companies intended to keep Fuchs in business. The layoffs resulted from an economic crisis in Asia, as well as lower demand for American steel resulting from the low import prices. However, the Asian market was returning by 1999, and Europe and South America were also possible new markets. In 2001, Voest-Alpine Industrieanlagenbau bought the rest of Fuchs Systems, which became VAI Fuchs and added VAI Technometal. In May 2001, however, Fuchs closed the Salisbury plant, its only American facility, because half the customers were bankrupt or close to it. AlloyWorks bought three of the buildings, and the fourth became a medical office. Also, in 2001, the steel industry worldwide experienced a downturn due to lower prices, though continuous casting (for which VAI was the world's top company) continued its positive results, especially in China. VAI reduced its six business areas to four: Iron & Steelmaking (the largest); Rolling & Processing; Automation, and Metallurgical Services.

Also in 2001, VAI's continuous casting operation added a casting and rolling mill for ultra-wide medium thickness slabs for IPSCO Steel in Mobile, Alabama, with what were believed to be the world's largest one-piece cast mill housings at 350 tons. The automation business completed a quality control project along with Voest-Alpine Stahl.

In 2003, VAI subsidiary Voest-Alpine Services & Technologies Corp. became majority owner of Steel Related Technology of Blytheville, Arkansas.

After the Siemens purchase of VA Technologie AG completed in July 2005, VAI became Siemens VAI, a part of the Siemens Industrial Solutions and Services Group. Siemens VAI was later named Siemens VAI Metals Technologies GmbH & Co. and also referred to as VAI Group, which was created from VAI and Siemens electrical engineering and automation businesses. Siemens Group Industrial Solutions and Services also included Voest-Alpine Services and Technologies (VAST). Both Siemens units operated from the Pittsburgh area. VAST provided mill maintenance services to steel and aluminum manufacturers from eleven locations: Baltimore, Maryland; North East, Maryland; New London, Ohio; Milan, Ohio; Benton Harbor, Michigan; Bethel Park, Pennsylvania; Blytheville, Arkansas; Charleston, South Carolina; Decatur, Alabama; and Erie, Pennsylvania, in the United States and Sault Ste. Marie, Ontario, in Canada.

=== Primetals Technologies ===
==== 2014 - Present ====
In 2014, Mitsubishi-Hitachi Metals Machinery and Siemens AG announced the establishment of a joint venture in which equity ownership shares were 51% for Mitsubishi-Hitachi Metals Machinery and 49% for Siemens AG. The joint venture, Primetals Technologies Limited, started operations in January 2015. In 2019, Primetals Technologies together with Mitsubishi Heavy Industries acquired ABP Induction Systems.

On September 30, 2019, Mitsubishi Heavy Industries and Siemens AG reached the agreement that MHI will acquire Siemens’ 49 percent stake in Primetals Technologies. The transaction was completed at the end of January 2020.

In Spring 2021, the international private equity investor Mutares completed the acquisition of Primetals Technologies France from Primetals Technologies, Ltd., subsequently changing the name to Clecim France.

In Fall 2021, Primetals Technologies, Ltd. transferred its shares of Primetals Technologies Italy to Callista Private Equity, a financial investment company located in Munich, Germany.
