= Basic oxygen steelmaking =

Steelmaking method

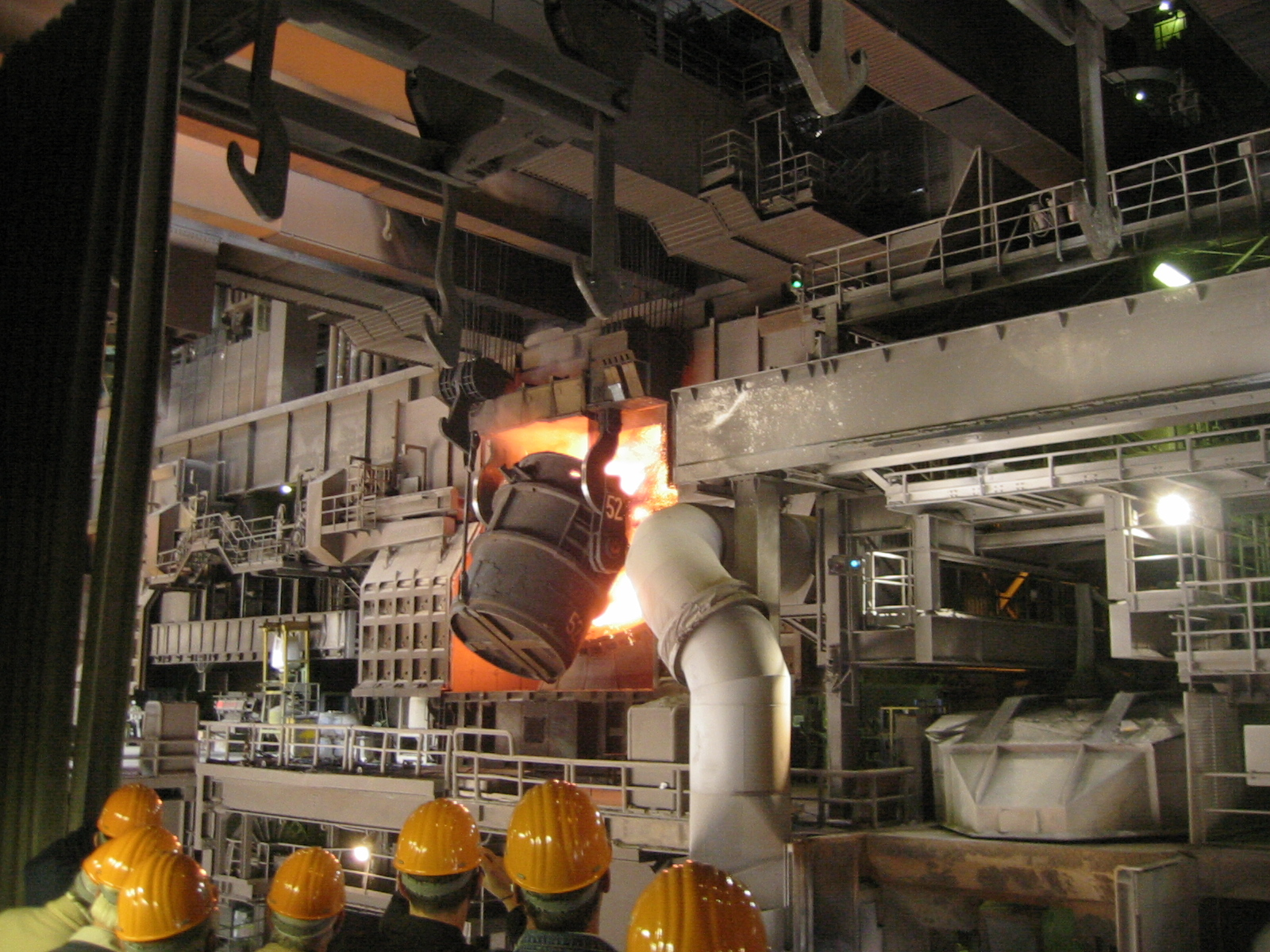
Oxygen converter being charged at ThyssenKrupp steel mill in Duisburg (Germany)

Basic oxygen steelmaking (BOS, BOP, BOF, or OSM), also known as Linz-Donawitz steelmaking or the oxygen converter process, is a method of primary steelmaking in which carbon-rich molten pig iron is made into steel. Blowing oxygen through molten pig iron lowers the carbon content of the alloy and changes it into low-carbon steel. The process is known as basic because fluxes of calcium oxide or dolomite, which are chemical bases, are added to promote the removal of impurities and protect the lining of the converter.

The process was invented in 1948 by Swiss engineer Robert Durrer and commercialized in 1952–1953 by the Austrian steelmaking company VOEST and ÖAMG. The LD converter, named after the Austrian towns Linz and Donawitz (a district of Leoben) is a refined version of the Bessemer converter which replaces blowing air with blowing oxygen. It reduced capital cost of the plants and smelting time, and increased labor productivity. Between 1920 and 2000, labor requirements in the industry decreased by a factor of 1,000, from more than 3 man-hours per metric ton to just 0.003. By 2000 the basic oxygen furnace accounted for 60% of global steel output.

Modern furnaces will take a charge of iron of up to 400 tons and convert it into steel in less than 40 minutes, compared to 10–12 hours in an open hearth furnace.

== History ==
The basic oxygen process developed outside of the traditional "big steel" environment. It was developed and refined by a single man, Swiss engineer Robert Durrer, and commercialized by two small steel companies in allied-occupied Austria, which had not yet recovered from the destruction of World War II.

In 1856, Henry Bessemer had patented a steelmaking process involving oxygen blowing for decarbonizing molten iron (UK Patent No. 2207). For nearly 100 years commercial quantities of oxygen were not available or were too expensive, and steelmaking used air blowing. During WWII German (Karl Valerian Schwarz), Belgian (John Miles) and Swiss (Robert Durrer and Heinrich Heilbrugge) engineers proposed their versions of oxygen-blown steelmaking, but only Durrer and Heilbrugge brought it to mass-scale production.

In 1943, Durrer, formerly a professor at the Technische Hochschule in Charlottenburg (now Technische Universität Berlin), returned to Switzerland and accepted a seat on the board of Roll AG, the country's largest steel mill. In 1947 he purchased the first small 2.5-ton experimental converter from the US, and on April 3, 1948 the new converter produced its first steel. The new process could conveniently process large amounts of scrap metal with only a small proportion of primary metal necessary. In the summer of 1948, Roll AG and two Austrian state-owned companies, VÖEST and ÖAMG, agreed to commercialize the Durrer process.

By June 1949, VÖEST developed an adaptation of Durrer's process, known as the LD (Linz-Donawitz) process. In December 1949, VÖEST and ÖAMG committed to building their first 30-ton oxygen converters. They were put into operation in November 1952 (VÖEST in Linz) and May 1953 (ÖAMG, Donawitz) and temporarily became the leading edge of the world's steelmaking, causing a surge in steel-related research. Thirty-four thousand businesspeople and engineers visited the VÖEST converter by 1963. The LD process reduced processing time and capital costs per ton of steel, contributing to the competitive advantage of Austrian steel. VÖEST eventually acquired the rights to market the new technology. Errors by the VÖEST and the ÖAMG management in licensing their technology made control over its adoption in Japan impossible. By the end of the 1950s, the Austrians lost their competitive edge.

In the original LD process, oxygen was blown over the top of the molten iron through the water-cooled nozzle of a vertical lance. In the 1960s, steelmakers introduced bottom-blown converters and developed inert gas blowing for stirring the molten metal and removing phosphorus impurities.

In the Soviet Union, some experimental production of steel using the process was done in 1934, but industrial use was hampered by lack of efficient technology to produce liquid oxygen. In 1939, the Russian physicist Pyotr Kapitsa perfected the design of the centrifugal turboexpander. The process was put to use in 1942–1944. Most turboexpanders in industrial use since then have been based on Kapitsa's design and centrifugal turboexpanders have taken over almost 100% of industrial gas liquefaction, and in particular the production of liquid oxygen for steelmaking.

Big American steelmakers were late adopters of the new technology. The first oxygen converters in the US were launched at the end of 1954 by McLouth Steel in Trenton, Michigan, which accounted for less than 1% of the national steel market. U.S. Steel and Bethlehem Steel introduced the oxygen process in 1964. By 1970, half of the world's and 80% of Japan's steel output was produced in oxygen converters.

In the last quarter of the 20th century, use of basic oxygen converters for steel production was gradually, partially replaced by the electric arc furnace using scrap steel and iron. In Japan the share of LD process decreased from 80% in 1970 to 70% in 2000; worldwide share of the basic oxygen process stabilized at 60%.

== Process ==
Principle of a LD (Linz Donawitz) converter

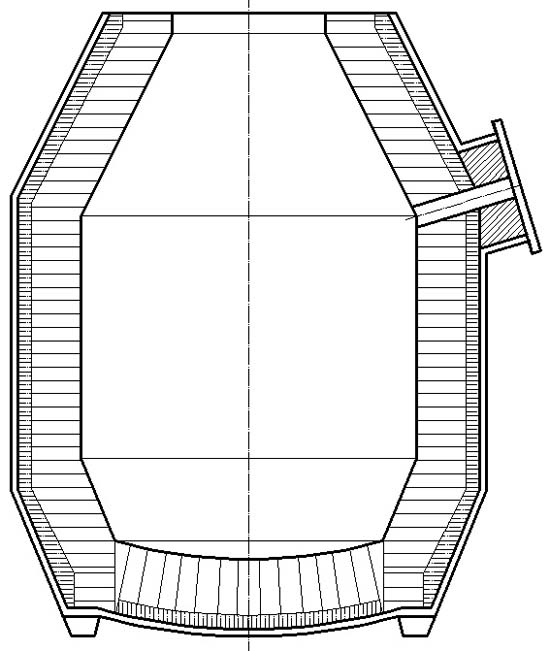
Cross-section of a basic oxygen furnace

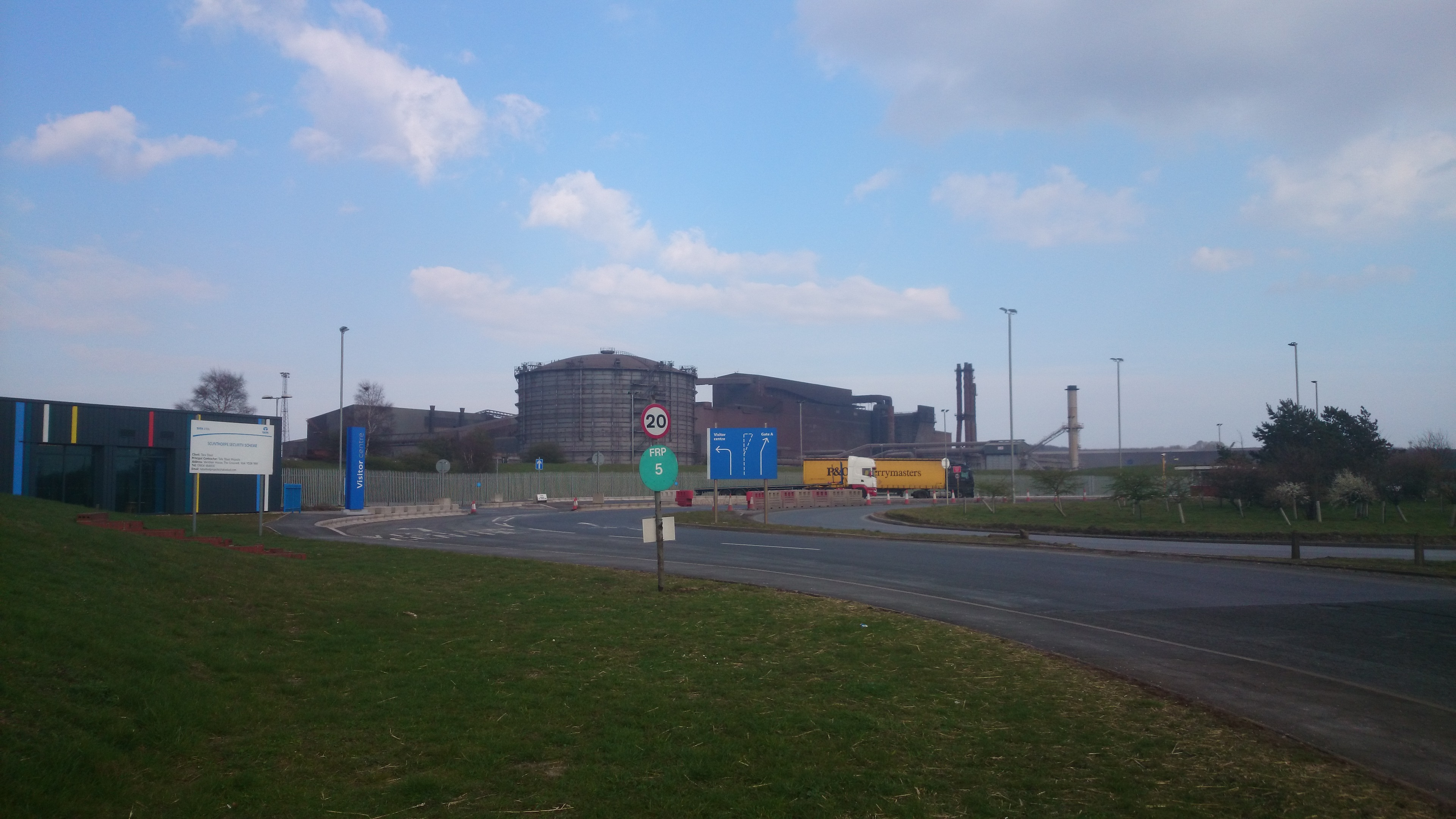
The outside of a basic oxygen steelmaking plant at the Scunthorpe steel works (England)

Basic oxygen steelmaking is a primary steelmaking process for converting molten pig iron into steel by blowing oxygen through a lance over the molten pig iron inside the converter. Exothermic heat is generated by the oxidation reactions during blowing.

The basic oxygen steel-making process is as follows:

1. Molten pig iron (sometimes referred to as "hot metal") from a blast furnace is poured into a large refractory-lined container called a ladle.
2. The metal in the ladle is sent directly for basic oxygen steelmaking or to a pretreatment stage where sulfur, silicon, and phosphorus are removed before charging the hot metal into the converter. In external desulfurizing pretreatment, a lance is lowered into the molten iron in the ladle and several hundred kilograms of powdered magnesium are added to reduce sulfur impurities to magnesium sulfide in a violent exothermic reaction. The sulfide is then raked off. Similar pretreatments are possible for external desiliconisation and external dephosphorisation using mill scale (iron oxide) and lime as fluxes. The decision to pretreat depends on the quality of the hot metal and the required final quality of the steel.
3. Filling the furnace with the ingredients is called charging. The BOS process is autogenous, i.e. the required thermal energy is produced during the oxidation process. Maintaining the proper charge balance, the ratio of hot metal from melt to cold scrap is important. The BOS vessel can be tilted up to 360° and is tilted towards the deslagging side for charging scrap and hot metal. The BOS vessel is charged with steel or iron scrap (25–30%), if required. Molten iron from the ladle is added as required for the charge balance. A typical chemistry of hotmetal charged into the BOS vessel is: 4% C, 0.2–0.8% Si, 0.08%–0.18% P, and 0.01–0.04% S, all of which can be oxidised by the supplied oxygen except sulfur (which requires reducing conditions).
4. The vessel is then set upright and a water-cooled, copper tipped lance with 3–7 nozzles is lowered into it to within a few feet of the surface of the bath and high-purity oxygen at a pressure of 700–1,000 kilopascals (100–150 psi) is introduced at supersonic speed. The lance "blows" 99% pure oxygen over the hot metal, igniting the carbon dissolved in the steel, raising the temperature to about 1700 °C as carbon monoxide and carbon dioxide are formed. This melts the scrap, lowers the carbon content of the molten iron and helps remove unwanted chemical elements. It is this use of pure oxygen (instead of air) that improves upon the Bessemer process, as the nitrogen (an undesirable element) and other gases in air do not react with the charge or decrease the efficiency of the furnace.
5. Fluxes (calcium oxide or dolomite) are fed into the vessel to form slag, to maintain basicity of the slag – the ratio of calcium oxide to silicon oxide – at a level to minimise refractory wear and absorb impurities during the steelmaking process. During "blowing", churning of metal and fluxes in the vessel forms an emulsion that facilitates the refining process. Near the end of the blowing cycle, which takes about 20 minutes, the temperature is measured and samples are taken. A typical chemistry of the blown metal is 0.3–0.9% C, 0.05–0.1% Mn, 0.001–0.003% Si, 0.01–0.03% S and 0.005–0.03% P.
6. The BOS vessel is tilted towards the slagging side and the steel is poured through a tap hole into a steel ladle with basic refractory lining. This process is called tapping the steel. The steel is further refined in the ladle furnace, by adding alloying materials to impart special properties required by the customer. Sometimes argon or nitrogen is bubbled into the ladle to make the alloys mix correctly.
7. After the steel is poured off from the BOS vessel, the slag is poured into the slag pots through the BOS vessel mouth and dumped.

== Variants ==
Earlier converters, with a false bottom that can be detached and repaired, are still in use. Modern converters have a fixed bottom with plugs for argon purging. The energy optimization furnace (EOF) is a BOF variant associated with a scrap preheater where the sensible heat in the off-gas is used for preheating scrap, located above the furnace roof.

The lance used for blowing has undergone changes. Slagless lances, with a long tapering copper tip, have been employed to avoid jamming of the lance during blowing. Post-combustion lance tips burn the CO generated during blowing into CO_{2} and provide additional heat. For slag-free tapping, darts, refractory balls, and slag detectors are employed. Modern converters are fully automated with automatic blowing patterns and sophisticated control systems.

== See also ==
- AJAX furnace, transitional oxygen-based open hearth technology
