= VAE Nortrak North America =

Voestalpine Nortrak, or VAE Nortrak, is a manufacturer of railroad track components. It started in October 1981 as Nortrak Railway Supply Ltd., an industrial supplier of new and used railroad track components. In November 1983, the company began manufacturing trackwork in Richmond, British Columbia, Canada. In 1990, Voest-Alpine Eisenbahnsysteme of Austria, which had been in the trackwork manufacturing business for over 140 years and became independent of Voest-Alpine AG that same year, formed a joint venture with Nortrak Ltd. and the company became known as VAE Nortrak Ltd. Voest-Alpine Eisenbahnsysteme became known as VAE Group, 90 percent owned by a joint venture between Voest-Alpine and Vossloh AG starting in 1998, and a subsidiary of voestalpine AG since 2003.

A second plant in Birmingham, Alabama, was completed in 1992, and a third operation in Cheyenne, Wyoming, was completed in 1997, where the company now has its headquarters.

In January 2004, VAE Nortrak North America Inc., acquired the assets of its competitor, Meridian Rail Track Products Corp. with operations at Pueblo, Colorado, Newton, Kansas, and Chicago Heights, Illinois. In November 2004, Nortrak acquired the assets of Rail Products and Fabrications including a trackwork plant and a manganese foundry in Seattle, Washington.

In 2007, Nortrak purchased two buildings in Cheyenne which allowed the company to add prestressed concrete railroad ties to its business lines.

On March 27, 2009, voestalpine AG said VAE Nortrak bought the assets of Leading Edge Enterprises of Decatur, Illinois, in the first step toward expanding its railway division.

On April 1, 2010, Nortrak announced it is now majority owner of DAMY Cambios de Vía, S.A. de C.V. of Guadalajara, Mexico, a leading Mexican manufacturer of trackwork for over 40 years, to be renamed Nortrak-DAMY.
