= Vanadis 4 Extra =

Vanadis 4 Extra is a chromium-molybdenum-vanadium alloyed tool steel produced by Uddeholms AB. It is intended for powder metallurgy cold forming operations on materials such as annealed austenitic stainless steel, mild carbon steel, copper and aluminium.

== Chemical composition ==
C	Si	Mn	Cr	Mo	Ni	V	S
1.40	0.4	0.4	4.7	3.5	-	3.7	-

== Properties ==
Vanadis 4 Extra is characterized by high to very high:

- ductility
- abrasive-adhesive wear resistance
- compressive strength
- dimensional stability during heat treatment and in service
- through-hardening properties
- temper back resistance
- machinability and grindability

== Application areas ==
This tool steel is especially suitable for applications where adhesive wear and/or chipping are the dominating failure mechanisms, i.e.;

- with soft/adherent materials such as austenitic stainless steel, mild steel, copper, aluminium, etc. as work material
- with thicker work material
- high strength work materials

Vanadis 4 Extra is however also very suitable for blanking and forming of Ultra High Strength Steel Sheet, these materials place high demands on the tool steel regarding abrasive wear resistance and ductility.

Examples:

- Blanking and forming
- Fine blanking
- Cold extrusion tooling
- Powder pressing
- Deep drawing
- Knives
- Substrate steel for surface coating
