= Böhler-Uddeholm =

Austrian company specialised in producing tool steel and special forgings

Böhler-Uddeholm AG
- Type: Wholly owned subsidiary
- Industry: steel
- Founded: 1991
- Headquarters: Vienna, Austria
- Key people: Franz Rotter, CEO
- Products: steel products, tool steel
- Revenue: €4.6 billion (2007)
- Owner: voestalpine
- Number of employees: 15,453 (2007)
- Website: www.bohler-uddeholm.com

Böhler-Uddeholm is an Austrian company specialized in producing tool steel and special forgings. It was formed in 1991 as a result of a merger between the Austrian parastatal Böhler and Uddeholms AB of Sweden. The company has production sites in Austria, Germany, Sweden, Brazil, Belgium, Turkey, China, United States and Mexico. As of September 2008, it is a wholly owned subsidiary of voestalpine.

== History ==
Böhler-Uddeholm was listed on the Vienna Stock Exchange between 10 April 1995 and 5 September 2008. In April 2007, voestalpine AG made a takeover offer for Böhler-Uddeholm - the bid was accepted by a majority of shareholders in June of that year. Voestalpine completed a squeeze out of Böhler-Uddeholm's remaining shareholders in September 2008 to gain complete control. The former Böhler-Uddeholm divisions "Precision Strip" and "Welding Consumables" were transferred to other divisions within the voestalpine group. The remaining "High Performance Metals" and "Forging" divisions were merged and became the fifth division, "Special Steel", of voestalpine AG.

== Former Böhler-Uddeholm AG companies ==
Division Welding Consumables

- Böhler Thyssen Schweißtechnik GmbH (see also UTP Schweissmaterial)
- Buderus Edelstahl Schmiedetechnik GmbH

Division Precision Strip

- Böhler-Uddeholm Precision Strip GmbH & Co KG
- Böhler-Uddeholm Precision Strip AB
- Buderus Edelstahl Band GmbH
