= Voestalpine =

Austrian technology and capital goods group

Coordinates: 48°16′26″N 14°20′00″E

Voestalpine AG
- Type: Public
- Traded as: WBAG: VOE
- Industry: Steel-based technology Capital goods
- Founded: 1 January 1938; 88 years ago
- Headquarters: Linz, Austria
- Key people: Herbert Eibensteiner (CEO); Wolfgang Eder (Chairman)
- Products: Tool steel plates, pipes and wires, steel automotive components
- Revenue: €15.06 billion (2025/2026)
- Operating income: €676 million (2025/2026)
- Net income: €425 million (2025/2026)
- Total assets: €16 billion (2025/2026)
- Total equity: €7.8 billion (2025/2026)
- Number of employees: 48,654 (June 2021)
- Subsidiaries: Böhler-Uddeholm
- Website: www.voestalpine.com

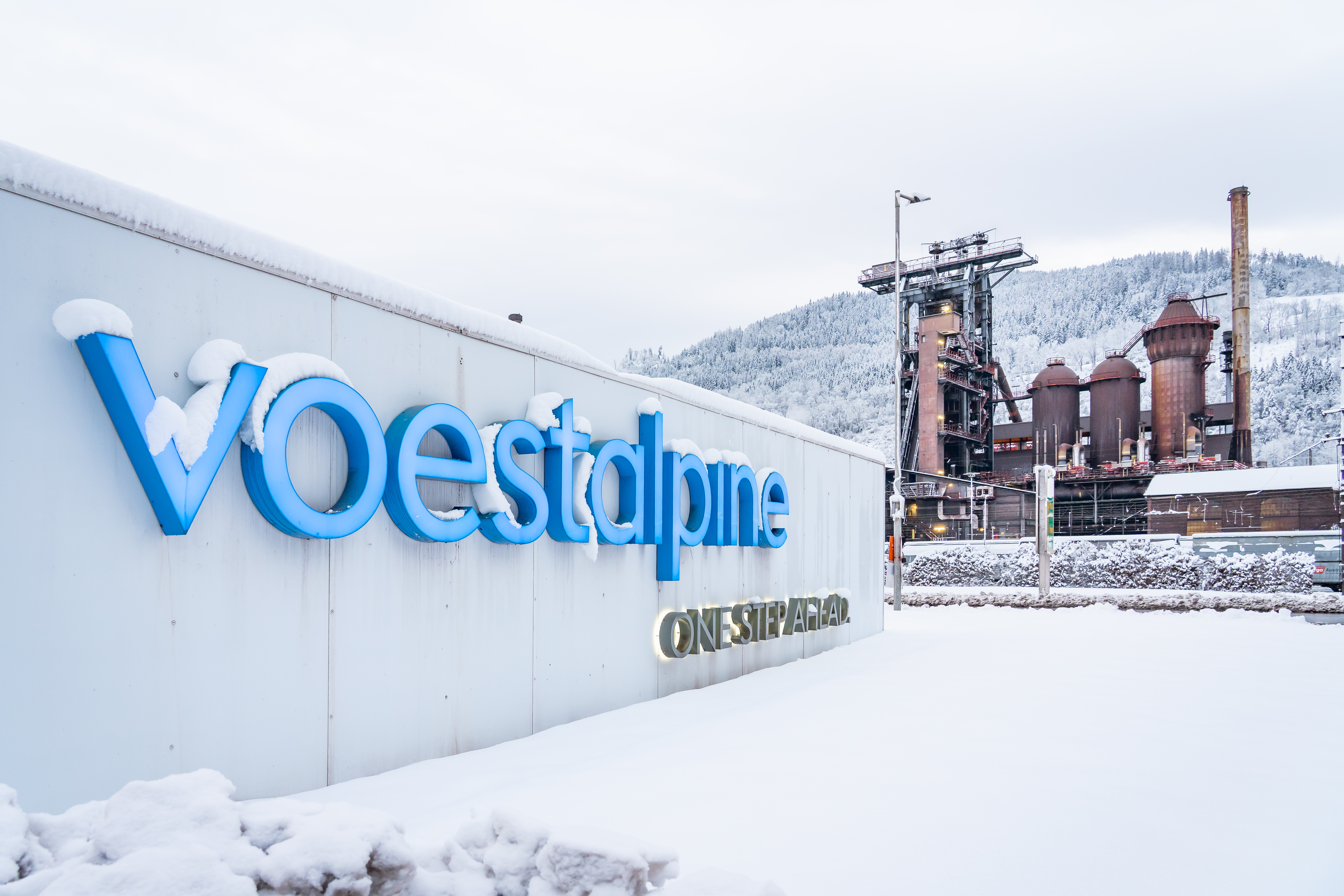
A view from the voestalpine wordmark onto blast furnace 4 of the Leoben-Donawitz integrated steel mill.

Voestalpine AG – stylized as voestalpine – is an Austrian steel-based technology and capital goods group based in Linz, Austria. The company is active in steel, automotive, railway systems, profilform and tool steel industries. As of 2017, it is one of the few profitable steel companies in Europe.

45 percent of its workforce is based in Austria. The Linz hot strip mill is a "fully integrated steel works" operated by voestalpine Stahl GmbH, a part of the steel division of voestalpine AG. In addition to Linz the most important plants are in Leoben in Styria and in Krems in Lower Austria. It had a large plant at Liezen in Styria which closed in the 1990s. Voestalpine is responsible for 10% of all Austrian CO_{2} emissions, which makes it the biggest emitter in the country.

The name of the company amalgamates its two principal components, the VÖEST (Vereinigte Österreichische Eisen und Stahlwerke) in Upper Austria, established through nationalization in July 1946, and the ÖAMG (Österreichische-Alpine Montangesellschaft) in Styria, established in 1881.

== History ==
=== Alpine Montan (1881–1945) ===
The Alpine Montangesellschaft (English: Alpine Mining Society) was founded in Vienna on 19 July 1881, as a vehicle of consolidating Austrian iron and steel assets. Some of these assets were later depleted, abandoned or sold. The core assets that remained concentrated in Styria: the iron ore pits in Erzberg and a steel mill in Donawitz. The company also owned smaller businesses and railroads in the Mur River valley and in Lower Austria (Krems and Schwechat). Alpine, chaired by Karl Wittgenstein, peaked in 1912, when it owned four coal mines, two iron ore mines and six metallurgical plants.

In 1922, fifty-six percent of Alpine Montangesellschaft, then owned by Fiat (see Camillo Castiglioni), was purchased by Hugo Stinnes for the German giant Vereinigte Stahlwerke AG (VS). After the Nazi Party came to power in Germany, the Nazi leadership and the German steel barons clashed in a conflict over the rate of economic growth: the Nazis demanded rapid buildup of industrial capacity while the big business feared overproduction and preferred to keep status quo. In the first half of 1937 the Nazi leadership openly broke with the steel barons and settled for state control over iron and steel production. In the same year Hermann Göring expressed his desire to control Austrian iron reserves at Erzberg. After the Anschluss state-owned Reichswerke Hermann Göring purchased a 13% share in Alpine, and for the next six months wrestled with the VS over control of the company. In March 1939, the VS stepped aside and the Reichswerke acquired 70% share of Alpine in exchange for a 10% share in the new plant in Linz. In June 1939, its name was changed to Alpine Montan AG Hermann Göring. The Reichswerke continued acquisitions and outright confiscations, and soon controlled around half of Austrian heavy industries. In 1944, the peak year for Alpine, its sales reached 371 million ℛ︁ℳ︁, 16% of the whole mining and steel sales of the Reichswerke.

=== Construction of Reichswerke in Linz (1938) ===
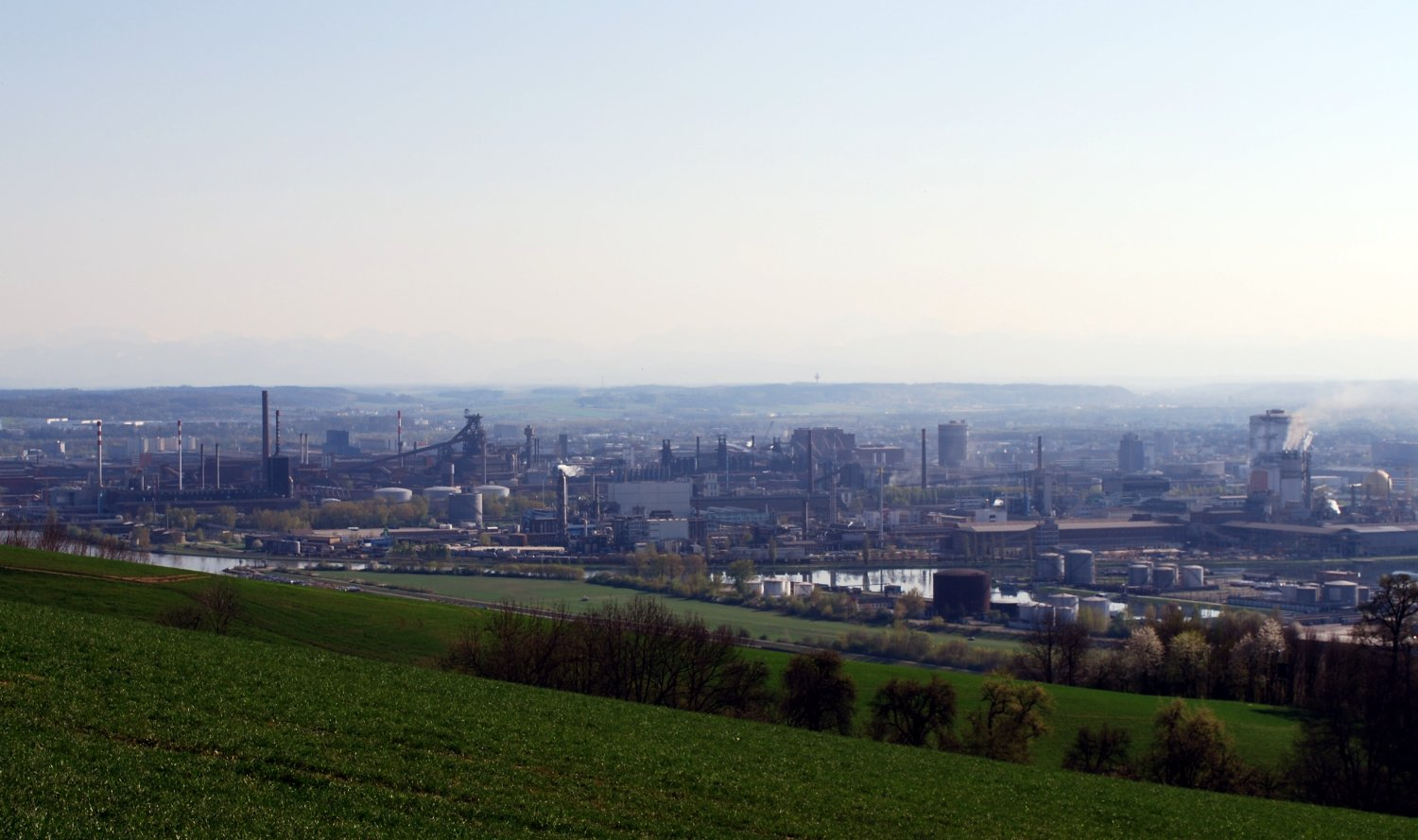
Panorama of the Linz steelworks, 2009

The Reichswerke announced its plans for a new steel mill in Linz before the takeover of Alpine, as an incentive for VS to extract more ore at Erzberg. Linz had a special place in Nazi system, and the steel project received full financial commitment of the state. On 13 May 1938, the ground breaking ceremony for the Hermann Göring Werke in Linz was held. Paul Pleiger was appointed chief of the Reichswerke in Linz for his services to the Nazis during the Anschluss. The synergy of steel works in Linz and ore reserves at Erzberg, vertically integrated into the Reichswerke, made it virtually independent of the steel elite of the Ruhr. The works in Linz were viewed as a hub of a future steel conglomerate spanning over the whole Central Europe.

The integration was completed with the takeover of Danube shipping companies and local construction businesses. The steel mill was completed during the conflict and was generously subsidized by the state. Between 1943 and 1944, when the Ruhr was heavily bombed (see Battle of the Ruhr), Hitler demanded a sharp increase in steel production in Austria. Göring launched a huge and unmanageable expansion campaign and spared no expense, all in vain: the Allied bombers levelled most of Linz, too.

=== Reconstruction (1945–1955) ===
During 1945, Allied-occupied Austria was partitioned into four occupation zones; the heavy industries of the former Reichswerke concentrated in the American (Linz) and British (Erzberg) zones. The future of Linz was debated in 1945–1946. Local government of Styria and the British objected to reconstruction of Linz works, calling it the white elephant, too far from coal and ore reserves, and too large to be economical. The American authorities at first concurred and suggested to reduce the Linz works to eight coke ovens under Alpine-Mountain management, dismantle the furnaces and use the parts for the needed repairs in Donawitz (Styria). The Soviets voted to dismantle Linz altogether.

The Austrian national government carefully persuaded the Americans to save Linz. In the summer of 1946, when allied negotiations on Linz reached a stalemate, the Americans decided to restore Linz unilaterally, regardless of British or Soviet opinion. Tactics of reconstruction became a subject of a debate between the Department of State, which advocated nationalization, and the U. S. Army, represented by Mark W. Clark, who stood for privatization. The diplomats prevailed, and the Austrian government was allowed to nationalize the former German assets at will. The mills of Linz were nationalized in July 1946 as the VÖEST (Vereinigte Österreichische Eisen und Stahlwerke, United Austrian Iron and Steelworks).

VÖEST decided to dispose with three of its six blast furnaces. One was dismantled and sold to SSAB (then known as Norrbottens Järnverk AB) in Luleå, Sweden; the proceeds were used to purchase coal in Poland. The supply of coal allowed VÖEST to restart its pig iron smelting operation in June 1947; the first pig iron was shipped to Sweden. Two other furnaces were earmarked for sale to Czechoslovakia; Mark Clark objected to this deal since 1946 and it finally fell apart after the Czechoslovak coup d'état of 1948.

VÖEST assets became the principal Austrian recipient of the Marshall Plan aid but access to American cash came only after a protracted political battle within Austrian establishment. Geoffrey Keyes had to recruit steel expert William E. Brewster to sort through the Austrian proposals. Brewster supported the Austrian four-year plan but its key opponent Franz Nemchak called it "a colossal stupidity" and demanded a halt on VÖEST program. The controversy spilled into the U. S. Senate, causing delays in Marshall Plan financing for VÖEST. VÖEST received its new slabbing mill but the new hot strip mill was delayed by the opposition of the Pentagon, which feared that VÖEST product would be sold to the Soviet bloc. The Pentagon removed their objections in January 1952, conforming to the consensus of other US agencies. The hot and cold strip mills were, at last, put into operation in 1953. By the end of 1953, the first phase of reconstruction was complete.

=== Post war, development of Linz-Donawitz process (1948–1990) ===
In the summer of 1948, VÖEST, ÖAMG and Swiss Roll AG agreed to co-develop the basic oxygen steelmaking process proposed by Robert Durrer (itself a development of Henry Bessemer's 1858 patent). By June 1949, VÖEST developed an adaptation of Durrer's process, the LD (Linz-Donawitz) process, (German: LD Verfahren; U.S. names: Oxygen Converter Process, Basic Oxygen Furnace Process, BOP, OSM). In December 1949, the VÖEST and the ÖAMG committed to building their first 30-ton oxygen converters. They were put into operation in November 1952 and May 1953 and temporarily created a surge in steel-related research. Thirty-four thousand businesspeople and engineers visited the VÖEST converter by 1963. The LD process reduced processing time and capital costs per ton of steel, contributing to the competitive advantage of Austrian steel. However, errors made by the VÖEST and the ÖAMG management in licensing their technology made control over its adoption elsewhere impossible and, by the end of the 1950s, the Austrians had lost their competitive edge.

VÖEST was merged with Österreichisch-Alpine Montangesellschaft and other companies in the 1970s, and the resulting company took the name Vöest-Alpine AG.

Restructuring of Austria's nationalised industries by 1988 produced a company called Voest-Alpine Stahl AG.

=== Private corporation (1990–2001) ===
In 1990, Österreichische Industrieholding AG (Austrian Industry Holding AG) became Austrian Industries AG as it took the first steps toward privatisation. In 1993, three companies formed from Austrian Industries AG--Voest-Alpine Technologie AG, and Voest-Alpine Stahl AG, and Böhler-Uddeholm. Privatisation began in 1995, when Voest-Alpine got listed on Vienna Stock Exchange. and the government sold its last shares of the company in 2003. Voest-Alpine Stahl owned 21.25 of Voest-Alpine Technologie, which was the parent company of the former Voest-Alpine plant-building unit Voest-Alpine Industrieanlagenbau, split from the larger company in 1956.

During 2001, Voestalpine bought Polynorm, a Bunschoten, Netherlands manufacturer of auto parts, in exchange for $118 million. At the time, the company stated its goal to be a 15 percent share of European auto-body parts.

In 1998, Voest-Alpine Stahl and Vossloh AG joined to purchase 90 percent of VAE Group. The Austrian manufacturer of railroad switches, turnout systems and related products was founded in 1851. as Hugo-Hütte by Hugo Henckel von Donnersmarck and owned by Österreichisch-Alpine Montangesellschaft from 1889 until that company's 1973 merger with Voest-Alpine AG, and had been independent since 1990. During 2002, the 45% Vossloh share in VAE was bought by Voest-Alpine for €140 million, and in 2003 VAE Group GmbH became a subsidiary of voestalpine Bahnsysteme division.

=== voestalpine AG (2001–present) ===
In 2001, the name of Voest-Alpine Stahl Group changed to voestalpine AG in order to fit the standard naming pattern of Austrian public corporations.

During 2006, Voestalpine decided to dispose of its steel trading group. Voestalpine Stahlhandel is now Cognor Stahlhandel, still based in Linz and part of the Cognor Group, a division of Zlomrex S.A. Capital Group.

In April 2007, voestalpine made a bid for 20.95 percent of the Austrian tool steel producer Böhler-Uddeholm, which was created in 1991 from the merger of Böhler Group and Swedish Uddeholm Group, the latter acquired by Voest-Alpine Stahl AG in 1990. The combined company was one of three created from Austrian Industries AG in 1993. By June, voestalpine held 55 percent of voting stock after "the largest acquisition in Austria’s industrial history", worth two billion Euros. In March 2008, voestalpine said it owned 90.24% of Böhler-Uddehom and intended to buy the rest.

In February 2018, voestalpine started constructing a steel mill in Linz, Austria specifically utilizing 6 MW hydrogen fuel technology instead of coal, which started in late 2019.

== Main divisions ==
- Voestalpine Steel: steel strip, heavy plate, casings for large turbines
- Voestalpine High Performance Metals: high-tech surface treatments, heat treatment, additive manufacturing processes
- Voestalpine Metal Engineering: railway infrastructure and industrial systems, including full welding solutions and seamless tubes
- Voestalpine Metal Forming: tubes, sections, precision strip steel products
- Voestalpine Railway Systems: integrated railway infrastructure solutions

== North American operations ==
During 1990, Voest-Alpine Eisenbahnsysteme and Nortrak Railway Supply Ltd. of Richmond, British Columbia, Canada formed a joint venture called VAE Nortrak North America, Inc., which later added operations in the United States.

The Birmingham, Alabama plant opened in 1992, followed by the Cheyenne, Wyoming plant in 1997, now the company's headquarters.

As a result of two 2004 acquisitions, Nortrak has other U.S. facilities in Pueblo, Colorado; Newton, Kansas and Chicago Heights, Illinois; and Seattle, Washington.

Roll Forming Corp., incorporated in 1947 and headquartered in Shelbyville, Kentucky, is the roll forming division of voestalpine AG. The company has supplied parts for the aerospace industry since 1949 and for Boeing airplanes since 1969. It also supplies NASA and McDonnell Douglas. Products also include model train tracks and gymnasium bleachers. At first the company made aluminum parts for airplane structures, but in the late 1980s, Roll Forming added preparing parts for assembly. The company still uses this process for Spirit AeroSystems, which puts together stringers for many of Boeing's larger planes. Other locations for Roll Forming are Jeffersonville, Indiana and Farrell, Pennsylvania. Roll Forming agreed to the purchase by Voest-Alpine Krems in 2000, giving the Voest-Alpine Stahl AG subsidiary its first manufacturing facilities in the United States.

In the 2010s, the company made a $740 million investment in a HBI plant outside Corpus Christi, Texas. Groundbreaking took place in April 2014 and production activity commenced on 28 September 2016. During 2022, the majority stake of the plant was sold to ArcelorMittal.

During 1978, Voest-Alpine and other European companies started Bayou Steel Corporation, incorporated in Louisiana in 1979. The first mill opened in LaPlace, Louisiana in 1981, but the company did not do well because of high energy prices and cheaper foreign steel. During 1986, Voest-Alpine sold its interest to R.S.R. Corporation.

In addition, Voestalpine AG owned a portion of Voest-Alpine Industrieanlagenbau (VAI), whose Voest-Alpine Industries subsidiary had its American headquarters in Pittsburgh, Pennsylvania. Siemens purchased VAI parent VA Tech in 2005.

== UK operations ==
Metsec plc, previously known as Metal Sections and TI Metsec, is a UK-based cold roll-forming company which was acquired by voestalpine AG in 1998. The company is based in Oldbury, and makes metal products for the construction and manufacturing industries. It was established in 1931 and is now (since 2014) known as voestalpine Metsec plc.

Voestalpine Signaling UK, previously known as CDSRail, produce diagnostic and monitoring infrastructure for rail. It was acquired by voestalpine AG in 2008.

== Submission of false information ==
On 9 March 2016, the World Bank Group announced the debarment of Isando-based Voestalpine VAE SA (Pty) Ltd and its affiliates for a period of 27 months. The punitive measure was applied following the failed disclosure of relevant information in the company's bid for a contract under the Multimodal Transport Project in the Democratic Republic of Congo.

The debarment of Voestalpine VAE SA (Pty) Ltd and affiliates qualifies for cross-debarment by other Multilateral Development Banks under the Agreement for Mutual Enforcement of Debarment Decisions.

== Finances ==
	2017	2018	2019	2020	2021	2022	2023	2024	2025	2026
Total revenue (€ billions)	11.3	12.9	13.6	12.7	11.3	14.9	18.2	16.7	15.7	15.1
Operating income (€ billions)	0.8	1.2	0.7	0.3	0.3	1.5	1.7	0.8	0.4	0.7
Net income (€ billions)	0.5	0.8	0.4	-0.2	0.04	1.3	1.1	0.1	0.2	0.4
Total assets (€ billions)	14.7	15.5	15.7	15.0	14.9	17.0	17.1	16.6	15.7	16.0
Total equity (€ billions)	6.1	6.6	6.7	5.6	5.7	7.1	7.8	7.5	7.5	7.8
Employees	45,866	47,603	48,792	47,668	46,048	46,938	48,231	49,082	47,724	41,486

== See also ==
- List of steel producers
