= Hydrochloric acid =

Aqueous solution of hydrogen chloride

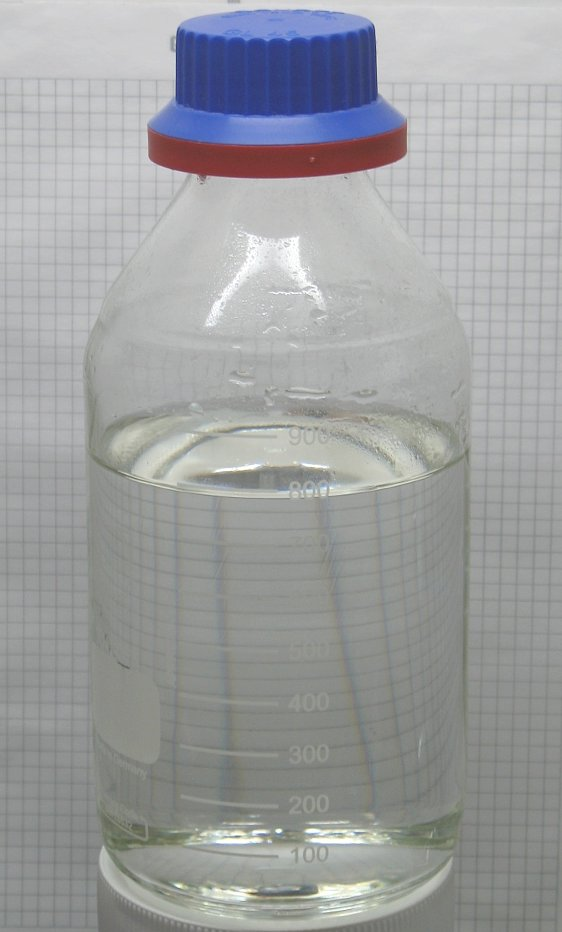

- Structure of Hydrochloric acid as dissociated chloride and hydronium ions

3D model of hydrogen chloride
3D model of water
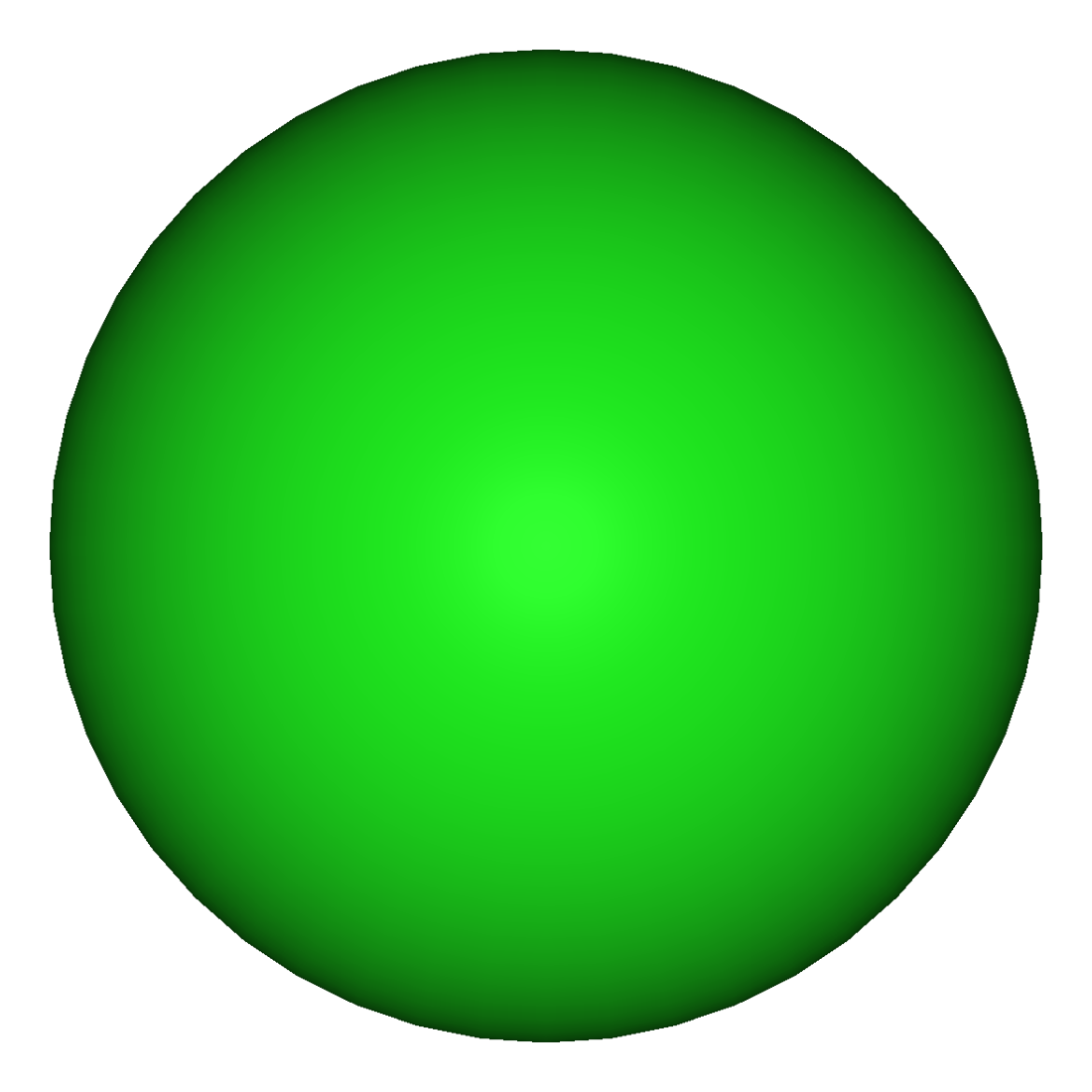
3D model of the chloride anion
3D model of the hydronium cation

Names
- IUPAC name Chlorane
- Other names: Muriatic acid; Spirits of salt; Hydronium chloride; Chlorhydric acid

Identifiers
CAS Number	7647-01-0
ChEMBL	ChEMBL1231821
ChemSpider	307
DrugBank	DB13366
ECHA InfoCard	100.210.665
EC Number	231-595-7
E number	E507 (acidity regulators, ...)
PubChem CID	313; monohydrate: 21885828; dihydrate: 21899424; trihydrate: 21864422; hexahydrate: 22077275
UNII	QTT17582CB
UN number	1789
- InChI: monohydrate: InChI=1S/ClH.H2O/h1H;1H2 Key: DKAGJZJALZXOOV-UHFFFAOYSA-N; dihydrate: InChI=1S/ClH.2H2O/h1H;2*1H2 Key: NSNHWTBQMQIDCF-UHFFFAOYSA-N; trihydrate: InChI=1S/ClH.3H2O/h1H;3*1H2 Key: CUGZEDSDRBMZMY-UHFFFAOYSA-N; hexahydrate: InChI=1S/ClH.6H2O/h1H;6*1H2 Key: VOAPTKOANCCNFV-UHFFFAOYSA-N
- SMILES: monohydrate: [OH3+].[Cl-]; dihydrate: O.[OH3+].[Cl-]; trihydrate: O.O.[OH3+].[Cl-]; hexahydrate: O.O.O.O.O.[OH3+].[Cl-]

Properties
Chemical formula	HCl(aq)
Molar mass	36.46 g·mol^{−1}
Appearance	Colorless, transparent liquid, fumes in air if concentrated
Odor	Pungent characteristic
Density	1.18 g/cm (37%Wt at 20°C)^{3}
Melting point	Concentration-dependent – see table
Boiling point	Concentration-dependent – see table
log P	0.00
Acidity (pK_{a})	−5.9 (HCl gas)

Pharmacology
ATC code	A09AB03 (WHO) B05XA13 (WHO)

Hazards
- Occupational safety and health (OHS/OSH)
Main hazards	Corrosive, reactive, toxic fumes
- GHS labelling
Pictograms	(GHS05: Corrosive) (GHS07: Exclamation mark)
Signal word	Danger
Hazard statements	H290, H314, H335
Precautionary statements	P234, P261, P271, P280, P303+P361+P353, P305+P351+P338
NFPA 704 (fire diamond)	3 0 1 ACID
Flash point	Non-flammable

Related compounds
Other anions	Hydrofluoric acid; Hydrobromic acid; Hydroiodic acid
Related compounds	Hydrogen chloride

Supplementary data page
- Hydrochloric acid (data page)
- Except where otherwise noted, data are given for materials in their standard state (at 25 °C [77 °F], 100 kPa). verify (what is ?) Infobox references

Hydrochloric acid, also known as muriatic acid or spirits of salt, is an aqueous solution of hydrogen chloride (HCl). It is a colorless solution with a distinctive pungent smell. It is classified as a strong acid. It is a component of the gastric acid in the digestive systems of most animal species, including humans. Hydrochloric acid is an important laboratory reagent and industrial chemical.

== Etymology ==
Because it was produced from rock salt according to the methods of Johann Rudolph Glauber, hydrochloric acid was historically called by European alchemists spirits of salt or acidum salis (salt acid). Both names are still used, especially in other languages, such as for example German: Salzsäure. (Note: Other examples include Dutch: zoutzuur, Afrikaans: soutsuur, Norwegian and Swedish: saltsyra, Finnish: suolahappo, Spanish: salfumán, Turkish: tuz ruhu, Polish: kwas solny, Hungarian: sósav, Czech: kyselina solná, Japanese: 塩酸 (ensan), Chinese: 盐酸 (yánsuān), and Korean: 염산 (yeomsan).)

Gaseous HCl was called marine acid air. The name muriatic acid has the same origin (muriatic means "pertaining to brine or salt", hence muriate means hydrochloride), and this name is still sometimes used. The name hydrochloric acid was coined by the French chemist Joseph Louis Gay-Lussac in 1814.

== History ==
=== 9th–10th century ===
In the early tenth century, the Persian physician and alchemist Abu Bakr al-Razi (c. 865–925, Latin: Rhazes) conducted experiments with sal ammoniac (ammonium chloride) and vitriol (hydrated sulfates of various metals), which he distilled together, thus producing the gas hydrogen chloride. In doing so, al-Razi may have stumbled upon a primitive method for producing hydrochloric acid, as perhaps manifested in the following recipe from his Kitāb al-Asrār ("The Book of Secrets"):

Take equal parts of sweet salt, Bitter salt, Ṭabarzad salt, Andarānī salt, Indian salt, salt of Al-Qilī, and salt of Urine. After adding an equal weight of good crystallised Sal-ammoniac, dissolve by moisture, and distil (the mixture). There will distil over a strong water, which will cleave stone (sakhr) instantly.

However, it appears that in most of his experiments al-Razi disregarded the gaseous products, concentrating instead on the color changes that could be effected in the residue. According to Robert P. Multhauf, hydrogen chloride was produced many times without clear recognition that, by dissolving it in water, hydrochloric acid may be produced.

=== 11th–13th century ===
Drawing on al-Razi's experiments, the De aluminibus et salibus ("On Alums and Salts"), an eleventh- or twelfth-century Arabic text falsely attributed to al-Razi and translated into Latin by Gerard of Cremona (1144–1187), described the heating of metals with various salts, which in the case of mercury resulted in the production of mercury(II) chloride (corrosive sublimate). In this process, hydrochloric acid actually started to form, but it immediately reacted with the mercury to produce corrosive sublimate. Thirteenth-century Latin alchemists, for whom the De aluminibus et salibus was one of the main reference works, were fascinated by the chlorinating properties of corrosive sublimate, and they soon discovered that when the metals are eliminated from the process of heating vitriols, alums, and salts, strong mineral acids can directly be distilled.

=== 14th–15th century ===
==== Aqua regia ====
One important invention that resulted from the discovery of the mineral acids is aqua regia, a mixture of nitric acid and hydrochloric acid in a 1:3 proportion, capable of dissolving gold. This was first described in pseudo-Geber's De inventione veritatis ("On the Discovery of Truth", after c. 1300), where aqua regia was prepared by adding ammonium chloride to nitric acid. The fact that aqua regia typically is defined as a mixture of nitric acid and hydrochloric acid does not mean that hydrochloric acid was discovered before or simultaneously with aqua regia. The isolation of hydrochloric acid happened about 300 years later. The production of hydrochloric acid itself (i.e., as an isolated substance rather than as already mixed with nitric acid) depended on the use of more efficient cooling apparatus, which would only develop in subsequent centuries.

=== 16th–17th century ===
From the point of view of Western history of chemistry, hydrochloric acid was the last of the three well-known mineral acids for which the method of its production appeared in the literature. Recipes for its production started to appear in the late sixteenth century. The earliest recipes for the production of hydrochloric acid are found in Giovanni Battista Della Porta's (1535–1615) Magiae naturalis ("Natural Magic") and in the works of other contemporary chemists like Andreas Libavius (c. 1550–1616), Jean Beguin (1550–1620), and Oswald Croll (c. 1563–1609). Among the historians who have written about this are German chemists Hermann Franz Moritz Kopp (1845) and Edmund Oscar von Lippmann (1938), mining engineer (and future U.S. president) Herbert Hoover with his wife geologist Lou Henry Hoover (1912), Dutch chemist Robert Jacobus Forbes (1948), American chemist Mary Elvira Weeks (1956), and British chemists F. Sherwood Taylor (1957) and J. R. Partington (1960). Italian chemist Ladislao Reti summarized the result of their efforts thus:

The first clear instance of the preparation of hydrochloric acid appears in the writings of Della Porta, (1589 and 1608), Libavius (1597), pseudo-Basil (1604), van Helmont (1646) and Glauber (1648). Less convincing earlier references are found in the Plichto of Rosetti (1540) and in Agricola (1558). As for the first practical method of preparation from vitriol and common salt, there is no doubt that pseudo-Basil precedes Glauber, but the latter has the unquestionable merit of having indicated the way of producing the acid later to be adopted by the chemical industry for large-scale operations.

— Ladislao Reti, How Old Is Hydrochloric Acid?

==== Dissolving metals ====
The knowledge of mineral acids such as hydrochloric acid would be of key importance to seventeenth-century chemists like Daniel Sennert (1572–1637) and Robert Boyle (1627–1691), who used their capability to rapidly dissolve metals in their demonstrations of the composite nature of bodies.

=== Industrial developments ===
During the Industrial Revolution in Europe, demand for alkaline substances increased. A new industrial process developed by Nicolas Leblanc of Issoudun, France enabled inexpensive large-scale production of sodium carbonate (soda ash). In this Leblanc process, common salt is converted to soda ash, using sulfuric acid, limestone, and coal, releasing hydrogen chloride as a by-product. Until the British Alkali Act 1863 and similar legislation in other countries, the excess HCl was often vented into the air. An early exception was the Bonnington Chemical Works, where, in 1830, the HCl began to be captured and the hydrochloric acid produced was used in making sal ammoniac (ammonium chloride). After the passage of the act, soda ash producers were obliged to absorb the waste gas in water, producing hydrochloric acid on an industrial scale.

In the 20th century, the Leblanc process was effectively replaced by the Solvay process without a hydrochloric acid by-product. Since hydrochloric acid was already fully settled as an important chemical in numerous applications, the commercial interest initiated other production methods, some of which are still used today. Since 2000, hydrochloric acid is mostly made by absorbing by-product hydrogen chloride from industrial organic compounds production.

== Chemical properties ==
Gaseous hydrogen chloride is a molecular compound with a covalent bond between the hydrogen and chlorine atoms. In aqueous solutions dissociation is complete, with the formation of chloride ions and hydrated hydrogen ions (hydronium ions). A combined IR, Raman, X-ray, and neutron diffraction study of concentrated hydrochloric acid showed that the hydronium ion forms hydrogen bonded complexes with other water molecules. (See Hydronium for further discussion of this issue.)

The pK_{a} value of hydrochloric acid in aqueous solution is estimated theoretically to be −5.9. A solution of hydrogen chloride in water behaves as a strong acid: the concentration of HCl molecules is effectively zero.

== Physical properties ==
Mass fraction	Concentration		Density		pH	Viscosity	Specific heat	Vapor pressure	Boiling point	Melting point
kg HCl/kg	kg HCl/m^{3}	mol/L	Baumé	kg/L		mPa·s	kJ/(kg·K)	kPa	°C	°C
10%	104.80	2.87	6.6	1.048	−0.5	1.16	3.47	1.95	103	−18
20%	219.60	6.02	13	1.098	−0.8	1.37	2.99	1.40	108	−59
30%	344.70	9.45	19	1.149	−1.0	1.70	2.60	2.13	90	−52
32%	370.88	10.17	20	1.159	−1.0	1.80	2.55	3.73	84	−43
34%	397.46	10.90	21	1.169	−1.0	1.90	2.50	7.24	71	−36
36%	424.44	11.64	22	1.179	−1.1	1.99	2.46	14.5	61	−30
38%	451.82	12.39	23	1.189	−1.1	2.10	2.43	28.3	48	−26
The reference temperature and pressure for the above table are 20 °C and 1 atmosphere (101.325 kPa). Vapor pressure values are taken from the International Critical Tables and refer to the total vapor pressure of the solution.

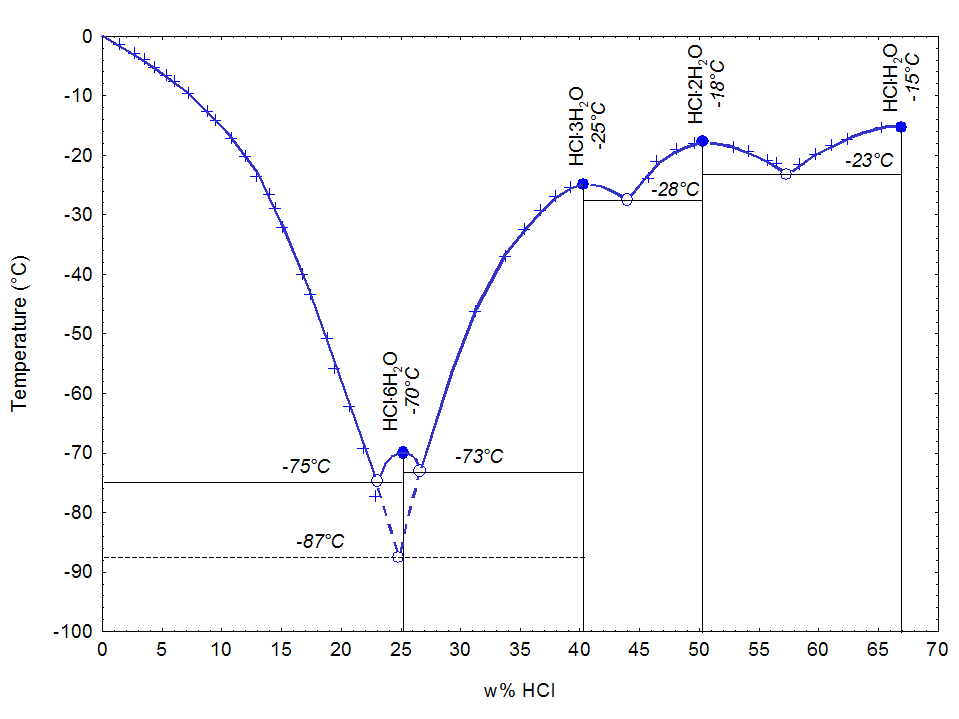
Melting temperature as a function of HCl concentration in water

Physical properties of hydrochloric acid, such as boiling and melting points, density, and pH, depend on the concentration or molarity of HCl in the aqueous solution. They range from those of water at very low concentrations approaching 0% HCl to values for fuming hydrochloric acid at over 40% HCl.

Hydrochloric acid as the binary (two-component) mixture of HCl and H_{2}O has a constant-boiling azeotrope at 20.2% HCl and 108.6 °C (381.8 K; 227.5 °F). There are four constant-crystallization eutectic points for hydrochloric acid, between the crystal form of [H_{3}O]Cl (68% HCl), [H_{5}O_{2}]Cl (51% HCl), [H_{7}O_{3}]Cl (41% HCl), [H_{3}O]Cl·5H_{2}O (25% HCl), and ice (0% HCl). There is also a metastable eutectic point at 24.8% between ice and the [H_{7}O_{3}]Cl crystallization. They are all hydronium salts.

== Production ==
Hydrochloric acid is usually prepared industrially by dissolving hydrogen chloride in water. Hydrogen chloride can be generated in many ways, so several precursors to hydrochloric acid exist. The large-scale production of hydrochloric acid is almost always integrated with the industrial scale production of other chemicals, such as in the chloralkali process which produces hydroxide, hydrogen, and chlorine, the latter of which can be combined to produce HCl.

Hydrogen chloride is produced by combining chlorine and hydrogen:

Cl_{2} + H_{2} → 2 HCl

As the reaction is exothermic, the installation is called an HCl oven or HCl burner. The resulting hydrogen chloride gas is absorbed in deionized water, resulting in chemically pure hydrochloric acid. This reaction can give a very pure product, e.g. for use in the food industry.

=== Industrial market ===
Hydrochloric acid is produced in solutions up to 38% HCl (concentrated grade). Higher concentrations up to just over 40% are chemically possible, but the evaporation rate is then so high that storage and handling require extra precautions, such as pressurization and cooling. Bulk industrial-grade is therefore 30% to 35%, optimized to balance transport efficiency and product loss through evaporation. In the United States, solutions of between 20% and 32% are sold as muriatic acid. Solutions for household purposes in the US, mostly cleaning, are typically 10% to 12%, with strong recommendations to dilute before use. In the United Kingdom, where it is sold as "Spirits of Salt" for domestic cleaning, the potency is the same as the US industrial grade. In other countries, such as Italy, hydrochloric acid for domestic or industrial cleaning is sold as "Acido Muriatico", and its concentration ranges from 5% to 32%.

Major producers worldwide include Dow Chemical at 2 million tonnes annually (Mt/year), calculated as HCl gas, Georgia Gulf Corporation, Tosoh Corporation, Akzo Nobel, and Tessenderlo at 0.5 to 1.5 Mt/year each. Total world production, for comparison purposes expressed as HCl, is estimated at 20 Mt/year, with 3 Mt/year from direct synthesis, and the rest as secondary product from organic and similar syntheses. By far, most hydrochloric acid is consumed captively by the producer. The open world market size is estimated at 5 Mt/year.

== Applications ==
Hydrochloric acid is a strong inorganic acid that is used in many industrial processes such as refining metal. The application often determines the required product quality. Hydrogen chloride, not hydrochloric acid, is used more widely in industrial organic chemistry, e.g. for vinyl chloride and dichloroethane.

=== Pickling of steel ===
One of the most important applications of hydrochloric acid is in the pickling of steel, to remove rust or iron oxide scale from iron or steel before subsequent processing, such as extrusion, rolling, galvanizing, and other techniques. Technical quality HCl at typically 18% concentration is the most commonly used pickling agent for the pickling of carbon steel grades.

Fe_{3}O_{4} + Fe + 8 HCl → 4 FeCl_{2} + 4 H_{2}O

The spent acid has long been reused as iron(II) chloride (also known as ferrous chloride) solutions, but high heavy-metal levels in the pickling liquor have decreased this practice.

The steel pickling industry has developed hydrochloric acid regeneration processes, such as the spray roaster or the fluidized bed HCl regeneration process, which allow the recovery of HCl from spent pickling liquor. The most common regeneration process is the pyrohydrolysis process, applying the following formula:

4 FeCl_{2} + 4 H_{2}O + O_{2} → 8 HCl + 2 Fe_{2}O_{3}

By recuperation of the spent acid, a closed acid loop is established. The iron(III) oxide by-product of the regeneration process is valuable, used in a variety of secondary industries.

=== Production of inorganic compounds ===
Akin to its use for pickling, hydrochloric acid is used to dissolve many metals, metal oxides and metal carbonates. The conversions are often depicted in simplified equations:

Zn + 2 HCl → ZnCl_{2} + H_{2}
NiO + 2 HCl → NiCl_{2} + H_{2}O
CaCO_{3} + 2 HCl → CaCl_{2} + CO_{2} + H_{2}O

These processes are used to produce metal chlorides for analysis or further production.

=== pH control and neutralization ===
Hydrochloric acid can be used to regulate the acidity (pH) of solutions.

HO^{−} + HCl → H_{2}O + Cl^{−}

In industry demanding purity (food, pharmaceutical, drinking water), high-quality hydrochloric acid is used to control the pH of process water streams. In less-demanding industry, technical quality hydrochloric acid suffices for neutralizing waste streams and swimming pool pH control.

=== Regeneration of ion exchangers ===
High-quality hydrochloric acid is used in the regeneration of ion exchange resins. Cation exchange is widely used to remove ions such as Na^{+} and Ca^{2+} from aqueous solutions, producing demineralized water. The acid is used to rinse the cations from the resins. Na^{+} is replaced with H^{+} and Ca^{2+} with 2 H^{+}.

Ion exchangers and demineralized water are used in all chemical industries, drinking water production, and many food industries.

=== Laboratory use ===
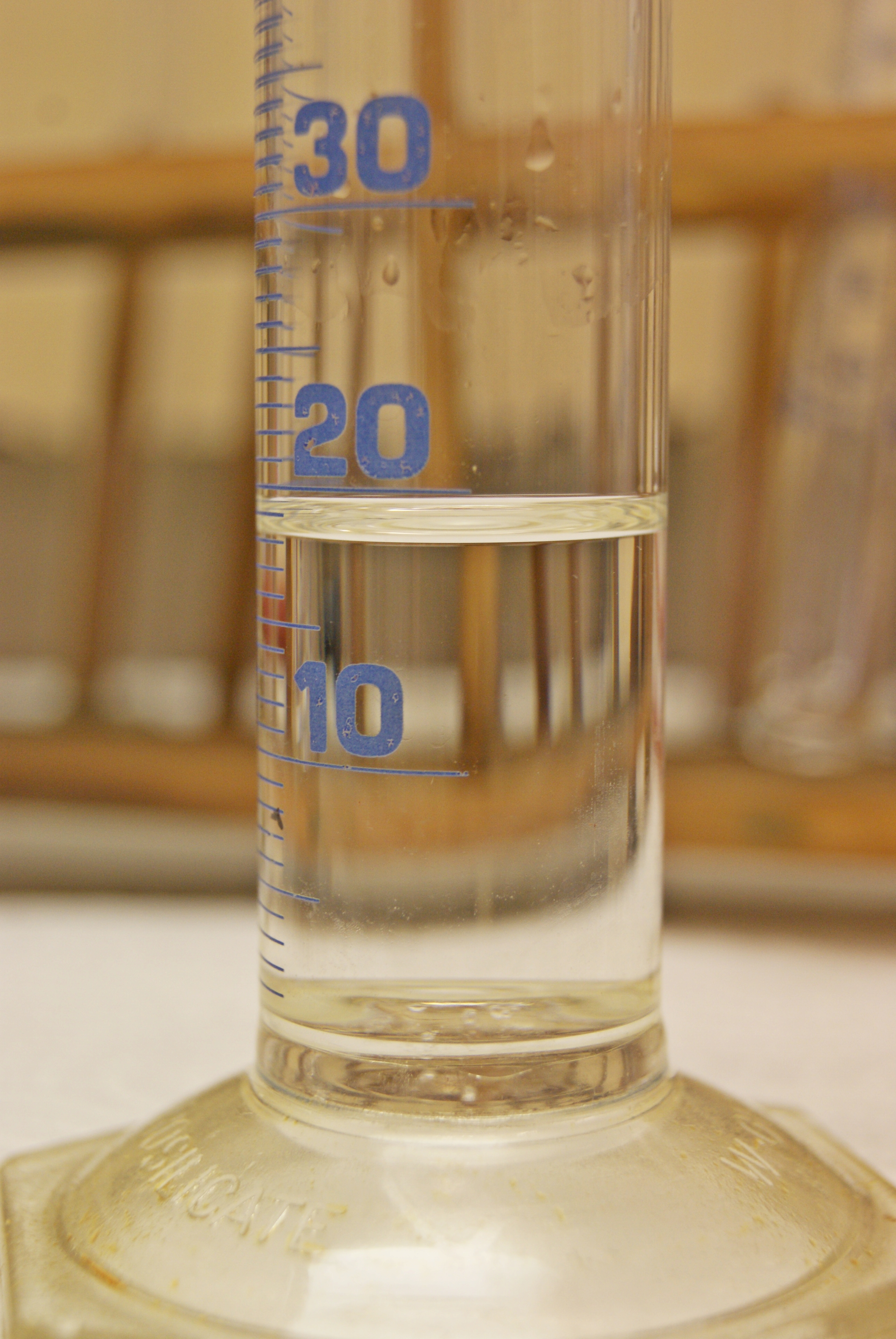
30% hydrochloric acid

Of the common strong mineral acids in chemistry, hydrochloric acid is the monoprotic acid least likely to undergo an interfering oxidation-reduction reaction. It is one of the least hazardous strong acids to handle; despite its acidity, it contains the non-reactive and non-toxic chloride ion. Intermediate-strength hydrochloric acid solutions are quite stable upon storage, maintaining their concentrations over time. These attributes, plus the fact that it is available as a pure reagent, make hydrochloric acid an excellent acidifying reagent. It is also inexpensive.

Hydrochloric acid is the preferred acid in titration for determining the amount of bases. Strong acid titrants give more precise results due to a more distinct endpoint. Azeotropic, or "constant-boiling", hydrochloric acid (roughly 20.2%) can be used as a primary standard in quantitative analysis, although its exact concentration depends on the atmospheric pressure when it is prepared.

=== Other ===
Hydrochloric acid is used for a large number of small-scale applications, such as leather processing, household cleaning, and building construction. Oil production may be stimulated by injecting hydrochloric acid into the rock formation of an oil well, dissolving a portion of the rock, and creating a large-pore structure. Oil well acidizing is a common process in the North Sea oil production industry.

Hydrochloric acid has been used for dissolving calcium carbonate, e.g. such things as de-scaling kettles and for cleaning mortar off brickwork. When used on brickwork the reaction with the mortar only continues until the acid has all been converted, producing calcium chloride, carbon dioxide, and water:

CaCO_{3} + 2 HCl → CaCl_{2} + CO_{2} + H_{2}O

Many chemical reactions involving hydrochloric acid are applied in the production of food, food ingredients, and food additives. Typical products include aspartame, fructose, citric acid, lysine, hydrolyzed vegetable protein as food enhancer, and in gelatin production. Food-grade (extra-pure) hydrochloric acid can be applied when needed for the final product.

== Presence in animals ==
Diagram of alkaline mucous layer in stomach with mucosal defense mechanisms

Gastric acid is one of the main secretions of the stomach. It consists mainly of hydrochloric acid and acidifies the stomach content to a pH of 1 to 2. Chloride (Cl^{−}) and hydrogen (H^{+}) ions are secreted separately in the stomach fundus region at the top of the stomach by parietal cells of the gastric mucosa into a secretory network called canaliculi before it enters the stomach lumen.

Gastric acid acts as a barrier against microorganisms to prevent infections and is important for the digestion of food. Its low pH denatures proteins and thereby makes them susceptible to degradation by digestive enzymes such as pepsin. The low pH also activates the enzyme precursor pepsinogen into the active enzyme pepsin by self-cleavage. After leaving the stomach, the hydrochloric acid of the chyme is neutralized in the duodenum by bicarbonate.

The stomach itself is protected from the strong acid by the secretion of a thick mucus layer, and by secretin induced buffering with sodium bicarbonate. Heartburn or peptic ulcers can develop when these mechanisms fail. Drugs of the antihistaminic and proton pump inhibitor classes can inhibit the production of acid in the stomach, and antacids are used to neutralize excessive existing acid.

Hydrochloric acid is also used by osteoclasts alongside proteases for bone resorption.

== Safety ==

Being a strong acid, hydrochloric acid is corrosive to living tissue and to many materials, but not to rubber. Typically, rubber protective gloves and related protective gear are used when handling concentrated solutions.

Vapors or mists are a respiratory hazard, which can be partially mitigated by use of a respirator equipped with cartridges specifically designed to capture hydrochloric acid. Airborne acid is an irritant to the eyes, and may require the use of protective goggles or a facemask.

Mass fraction	Classification	List of H-phrases
10% ≤ C < 25%	Causes skin irritation, Causes serious eye irritation,	H315, H319
C ≥ 10%	May cause respiratory irritation	H335
C ≥ 25%	Causes severe skin burns and eye damage	H314

== Legal status ==
Hydrochloric acid has been listed as a Table II precursor under the 1988 United Nations Convention Against Illicit Traffic in Narcotic Drugs and Psychotropic Substances because of its use in the production of heroin, cocaine, and methamphetamine.

== See also ==
- Chloride, inorganic salts of hydrochloric acid
- Hydrochloride, organic salts of hydrochloric acid from sodium hydroxide
- Aqua regia
