= Sugar Museum (Berlin) =

Former museum in Germany, integrated into the German Museum of Technology

Coordinates: 52°32′44″N 13°20′43″E

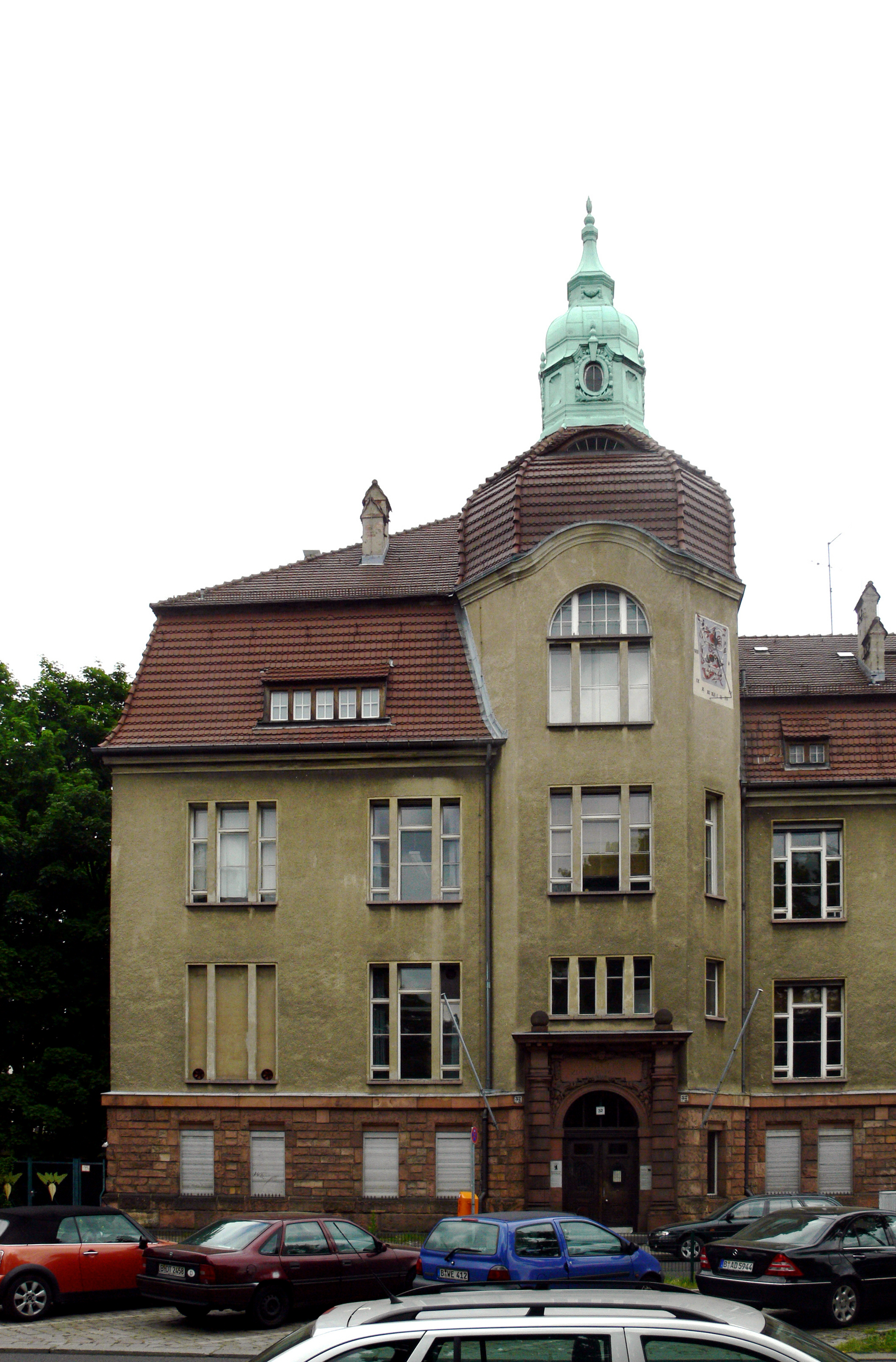
Building that formerly housed the Sugar Museum, in Amrumer Straße in Wedding

Sugar Museum, Berlin

The Sugar Museum was a museum that operated from 1904 until 2012 in Berlin with exhibits dedicated to the history and technology of sugar. At its closure as an independent museum in 2012, it was the oldest such museum in the world, and was housed in the Institut für Lebensmitteltechnologie (Institute of Food Technology) in Wedding, Mitte. It reopened in the form of a modernized exhibit at the German Museum of Technology in Kreuzberg in November 2015.

== History ==
Berlin played an important role in the history of sugar production. Andreas Sigismund Marggraf discovered beet sugar there in 1747, and his student Franz Carl Achard was the first to produce it, beginning in 1783, in Kaulsdorf, which became part of Greater Berlin in 1920. In 1799 he presented the product to King Frederick William III of Prussia, who sponsored him in establishing in 1801 the first beet sugar production facility in the world in Cunern, in Silesia (now Konary, Wołów County, Poland).

In 1867 a sugar research laboratory was established in Berlin under Carl Scheibler. On 8 May 1904, the Institute for Sugar Industry which had developed out of this opened, and the Sugar Museum simultaneously opened on the upper floor of the building, as the first such institution in the world. Edmund Oskar von Lippmann is largely credited for the opening of the museum. In 1945, the museum became the property of Berlin, and in 1978 of Technische Universität Berlin. In 1988, it became a state museum of the former GDR and, after a year of renovations, reopened on 22 September 1989. Since 1 November 1995, it has been a branch museum of the German Museum of Technology. The museum remained in its original building in the sugar industry neighbourhood of Wedding until November 2012.

The Sugar Museum had 450 square metres of floor space devoted to the history and technology of sugar. About 20,000 people visited it every year.

== Permanent exhibition ==
At the independent museum, exhibits were labelled in German only, although an English-language pamphlet describing them was also available. Lonely Planet called the Sugar Museum "quirky... a surprisingly entertaining exhibit where you’ll learn all about the origin of sugar and its chemistry."

The long-time director of the Sugar Museum, Hubert Olbrich, said in 1989 that its purpose was "To show and thus bring before the public the history and the development of sugar into a staple food of humanity, how it is obtained and how it is used". The museum's permanent exhibits cover the science and nutrition of sugar and its history from technological, cultural and political standpoints. They are organised into seven thematic groups:

=== Sugarcane ===
This section describes the biology and cultivation history of sugarcane (Saccharum spp.), from its use more than 10,000 years ago by the natives of Melanesia as a source of nutrition to the first report of it in the West by generals of Alexander the Great, successive improvements in sugar refining and its planting on the island of Hispaniola. The exhibits include sugar harvesting and refining machinery and information on agricultural pests which affect sugar.

=== Sugar in colonialism ===
Since the climate in the Caribbean was well suited to growing sugar, beginning in the 16th century, sugar was a major product of Western colonialism. Refining the sugar in the colonies where it was grown was legally discouraged or forbidden, so it was shipped back to Europe. The exhibits include models of the ships used and portray the development of major centres of sugar trading and refining in cities like Antwerp, Amsterdam, Bordeaux, Hamburg and London and the hard conditions for workers in both the sugar plantations and the sugar refineries. In the European refineries, the sugar industry pioneered the use of guest workers, in England predominantly Germans, who had a reputation for hard work, good humour, and the ability to withstand the heat.

=== The slave trade ===
The great demand for sugar in Europe and the resulting ever increasing need for plantation workers led to the near extinction of the natives and made sugar production dependent on African slaves. Current estimates are that between 1500 and 1850, some 20 million people were forcibly transported to the Americas. Exhibits in the Sklavenwirtschaft / Plantagenwirtschaft (Slave trade / Plantation trade) section of the museum depict the inhumane conditions on slave ships and give glimpses into the lives of the workers in the New World. The European demand for sugar was so great, however, and the resulting wealth of the "West India interest" so influential, that despite the boycott efforts of the 'Anti-Sacharrites', not until sugar could be made from sugar beets did antislavery advocates prevail, as for example they did in England in 1807 with the passage of the Slave Trade Act.

=== The sugar beet in Prussia ===
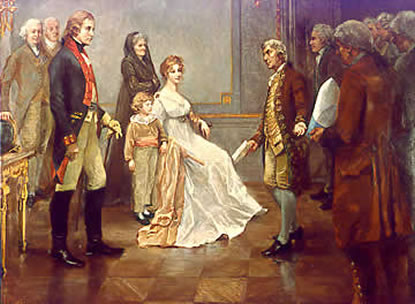
Friedrich Wilhelm III empfängt Achard by Clara Elisabeth Fischer

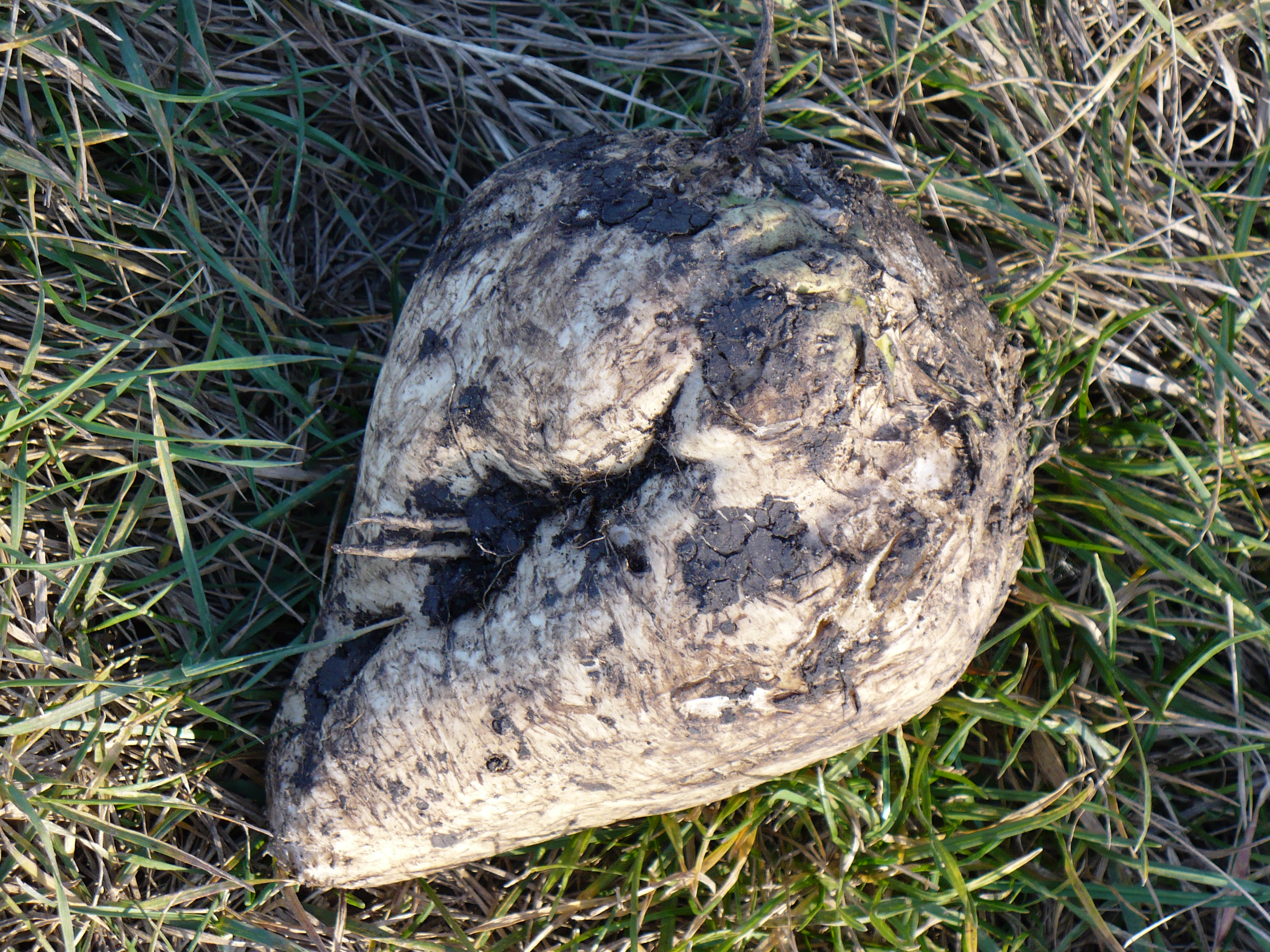
Unlike sugar cane, the sugar beet can be easily grown and harvested in Germany.

The discovery of beet sugar changed sugar from a luxury good to a mass commodity in Berlin in a little over a century. Exhibits in this section of the museum include a model of the first sugar beet processing plant in the world, built in Silesia in 1801, which demonstrates both the progress which was required before sugar could be industrially produced, and the working conditions in such plants. A 14-part diorama shows the steps in the production of sugar from sugar beets in Nauen around 1920.

In addition, a large 1903 painting by Clara Elisabeth Fischer, commissioned by E.O. von Lippmann for the museum, depicts a fictional scene of Franz Carl Achard, the 'inventor' of beet sugar, presenting his discovery to King Frederick William III in the form of a sugarloaf; Achard actually sent his beet sugar to the king. All known varieties of sugar beet today descend from the plants developed by Achard over 20 years of selective breeding in Kaulsdorf.

=== Sugar production ===
With increasing industrialisation, sugar from beets became a staple food in Germany. This section of the museum covers the geographic distribution of sugar production in Germany, the advances in its cultivation and processing over the past 100 years, and the economic and ecological significance of byproducts such as molasses and bagasse; the production of biodegradable plastics, ethanol and yeast are examples of the broader context of the sugar industry.

=== A world without sugar ===
This section of the museum tells the consumer side of the story of sugar since the 18th century, its use as a status symbol, a medicinal cure and finally an everyday element used far more in foods than is generally realised. One display area shows luxury items of porcelain or precious metals made to hold sugar when it was a very expensive item.

Exhibits explore issues of the relationship between sugar consumption and health and present alternative sweeteners, but also depict the fundamental role of sugar as a means of delivering energy in both plants and animals. Sugar can never be totally replaced by other sweeteners.

=== No alcohol without sugar ===
For at least 7,000 years, people have been fermenting sugary liquids to produce alcohol (ethanol). This section of the museum, housed in the winter garden, covers the discovery of alcohol (probably from consumption of fermented fruit) and the history of the use of sugar to make wine, beer and distilled alcoholic beverages such as whisky and brandy, as far back as the Sumerians, who brewed beer 6,000 years ago.

== Special exhibitions ==
The museum also mounted occasional special exhibitions. These have included:

- "Zuckermotive auf Briefmarken" (sugar motifs on postage stamps), 6 May – 7 July 1991.
- "Zuckergefäße und Zuckergeräte aus Silber" (silver sugar containers and utensils), 10 June 1993 – mid-June 2001.
- "Das Zuckerbankett zur Jülicher Hochzeit in Düsseldorf 1585" (the sugar banquet at the Jülich wedding in Düsseldorf in 1585): accurate reconstruction of the historic banquet, 11 October 1998 – 11 March 1999.
- "Brause – Limo & Co": sugared drinks sold at the turn of the twentieth century, 3 May 1999 – 10 February 2000.
- "Mit Landesväterlicher Freude vernommen – Rübenzucker in Preußen" (perceived with joy by the father of our country—beet sugar in Prussia): cane sugar and beet sugar in Prussia, 22 September 2001 – 17 February 2002.
- "Süßes Berlin – Zuckerbauwerke" (sweet Berlin—sugar constructions): sugar models of buildings and monuments in Berlin, to open the newly renovated top floor exhibit space, 4 July 2002 – 22 July 2003.
- "Andere Saiten aufziehen" (re-stringing the fiddle): illumination through experiments of Achard's work in celebration of his 250th anniversary, 30 August 2003 – 20 June 2004.
- "Zwischen Rübe und Kristall" (between beet and crystals): on the chemical and physical analysis of sugar, 25 August 2005 – 2 September 2007.

== Selected displays ==
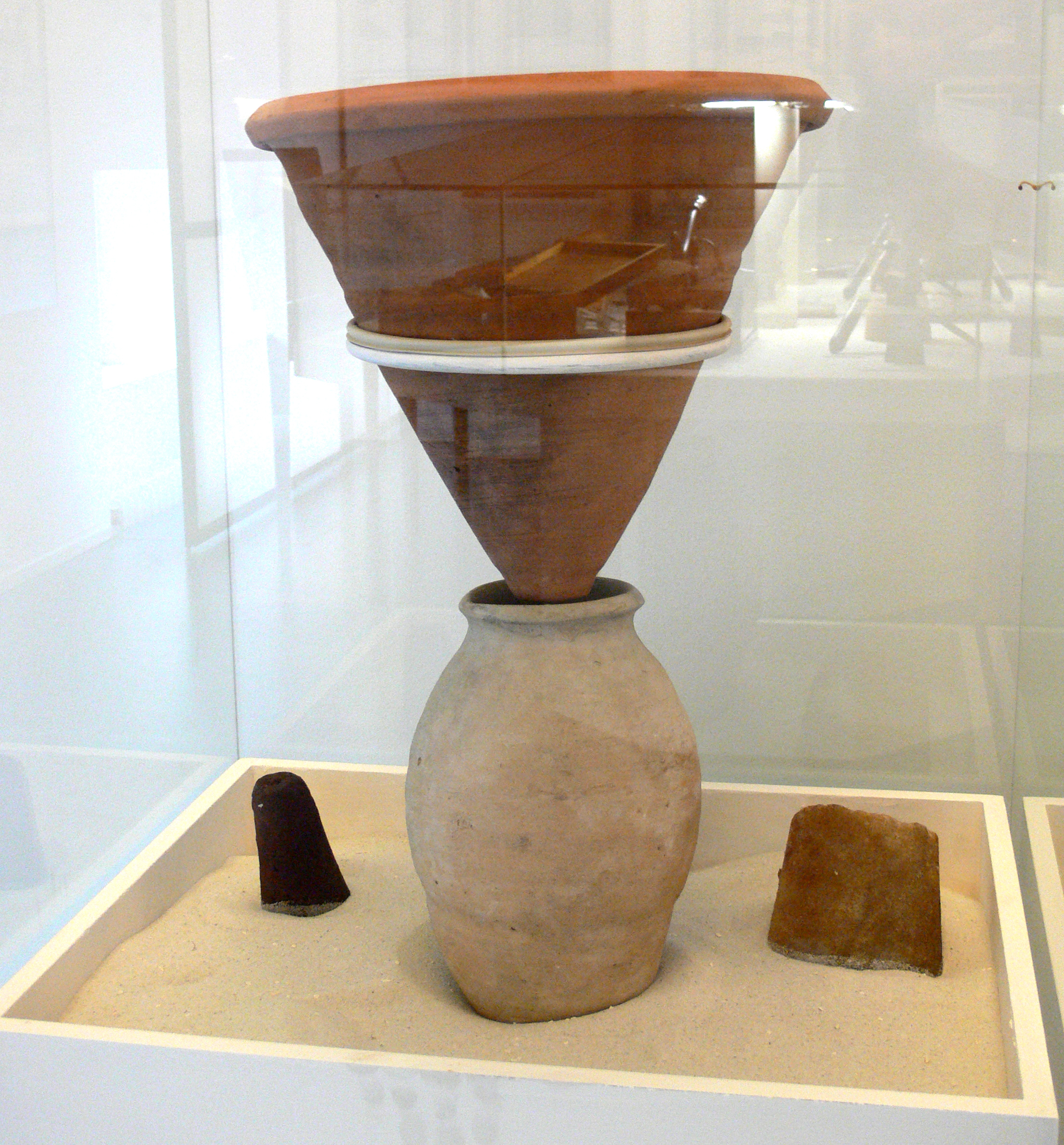
Crystallisation funnel with syrup pot, from a medieval sugar mill in Cyprus (15th century)

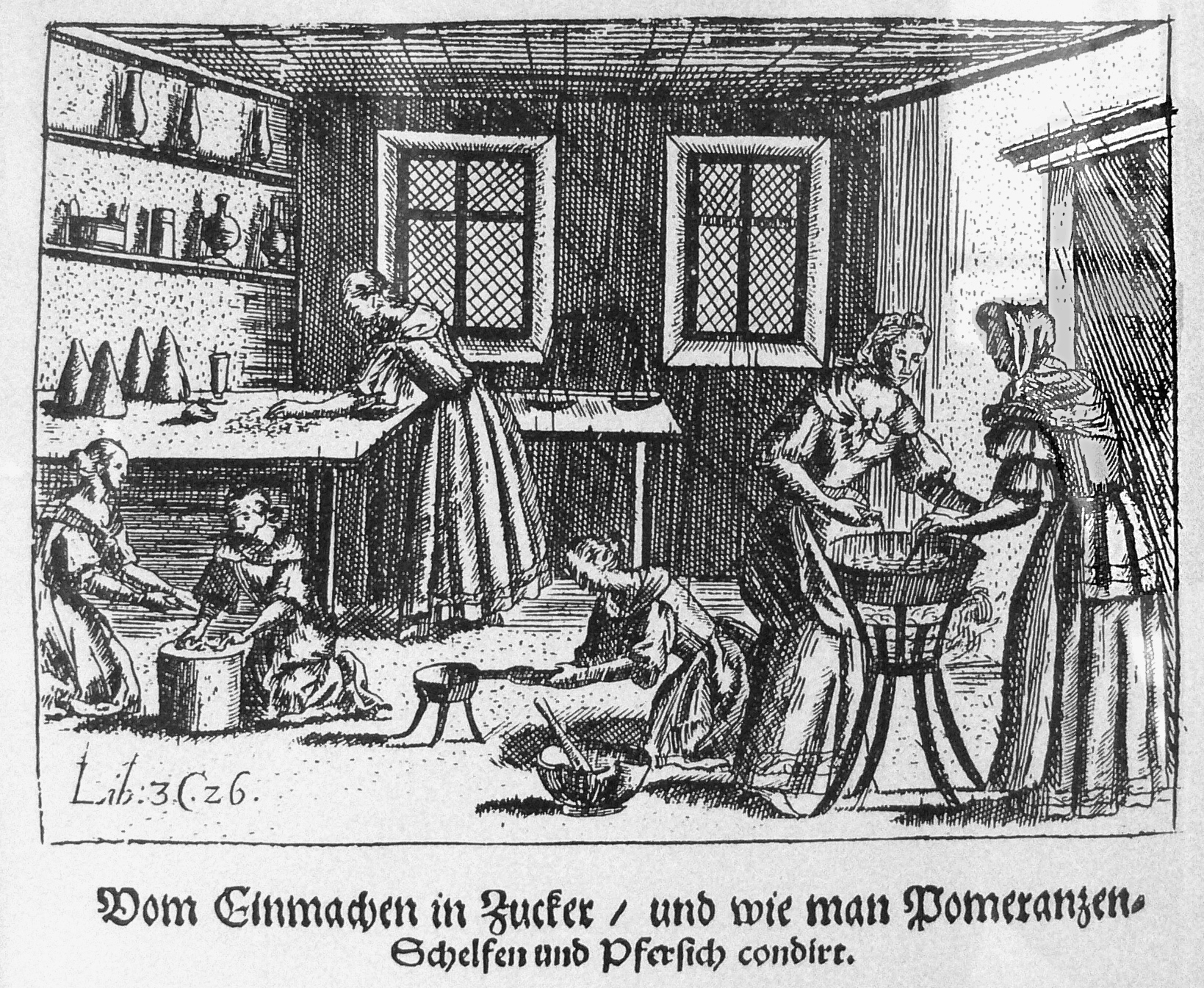
Print showing sugar used in home preservation of fruit (17th century?)

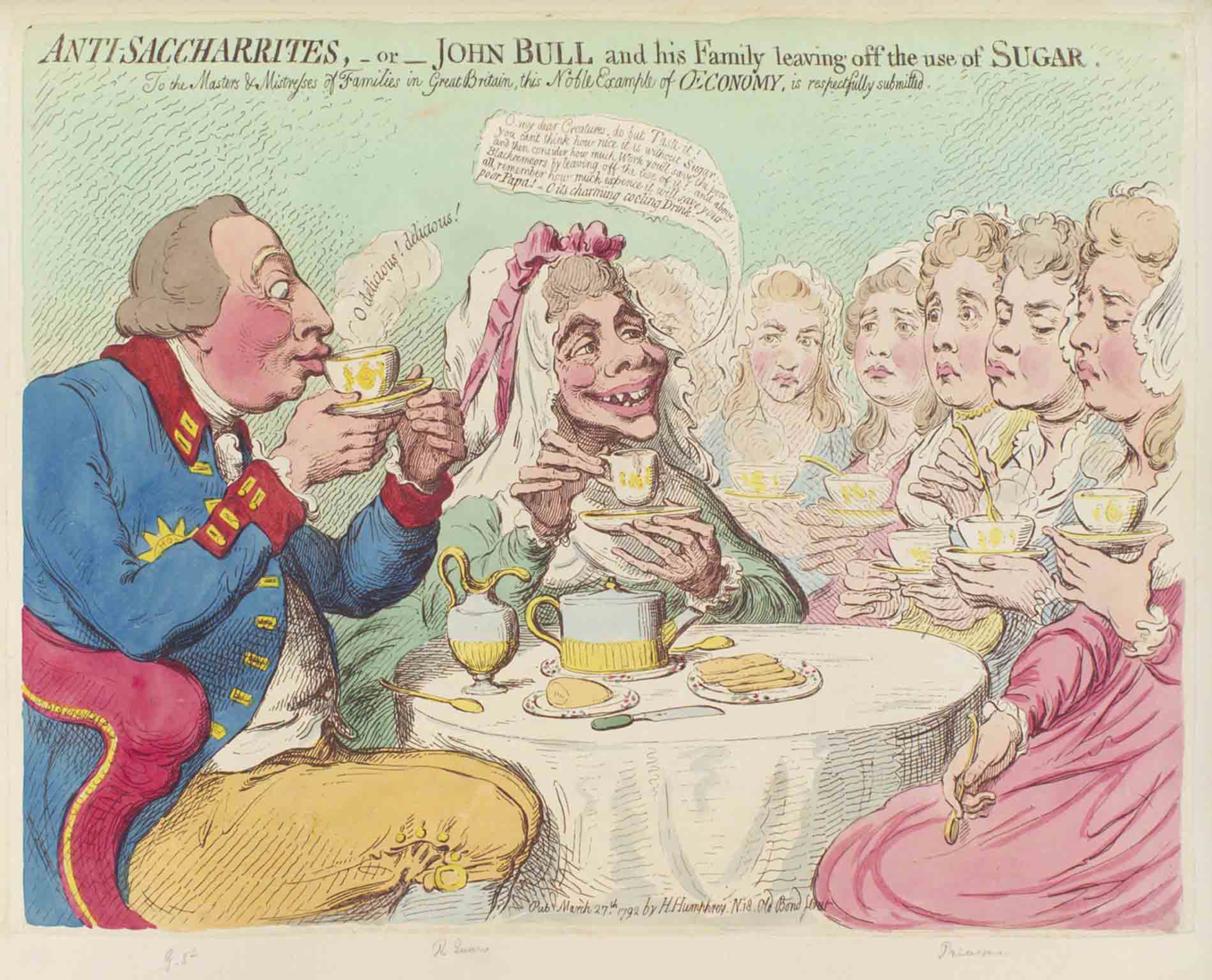
Caricature of King George III and his wife and daughters mocks 1791 anti-slavery campaign to boycott sugar

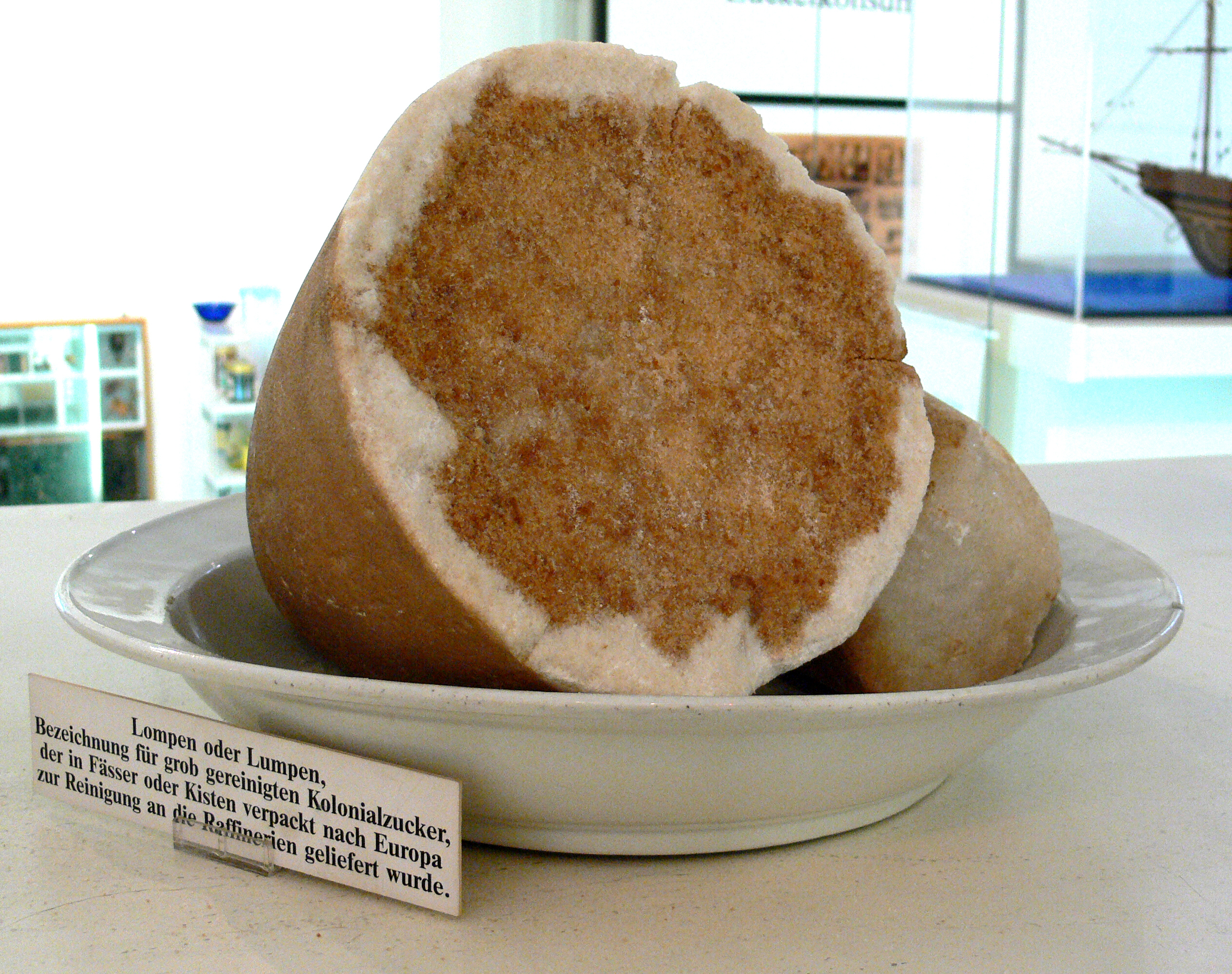
Lump of roughly-cleaned colonial sugar, which was packed in barrels or boxes to be delivered to European refineries.

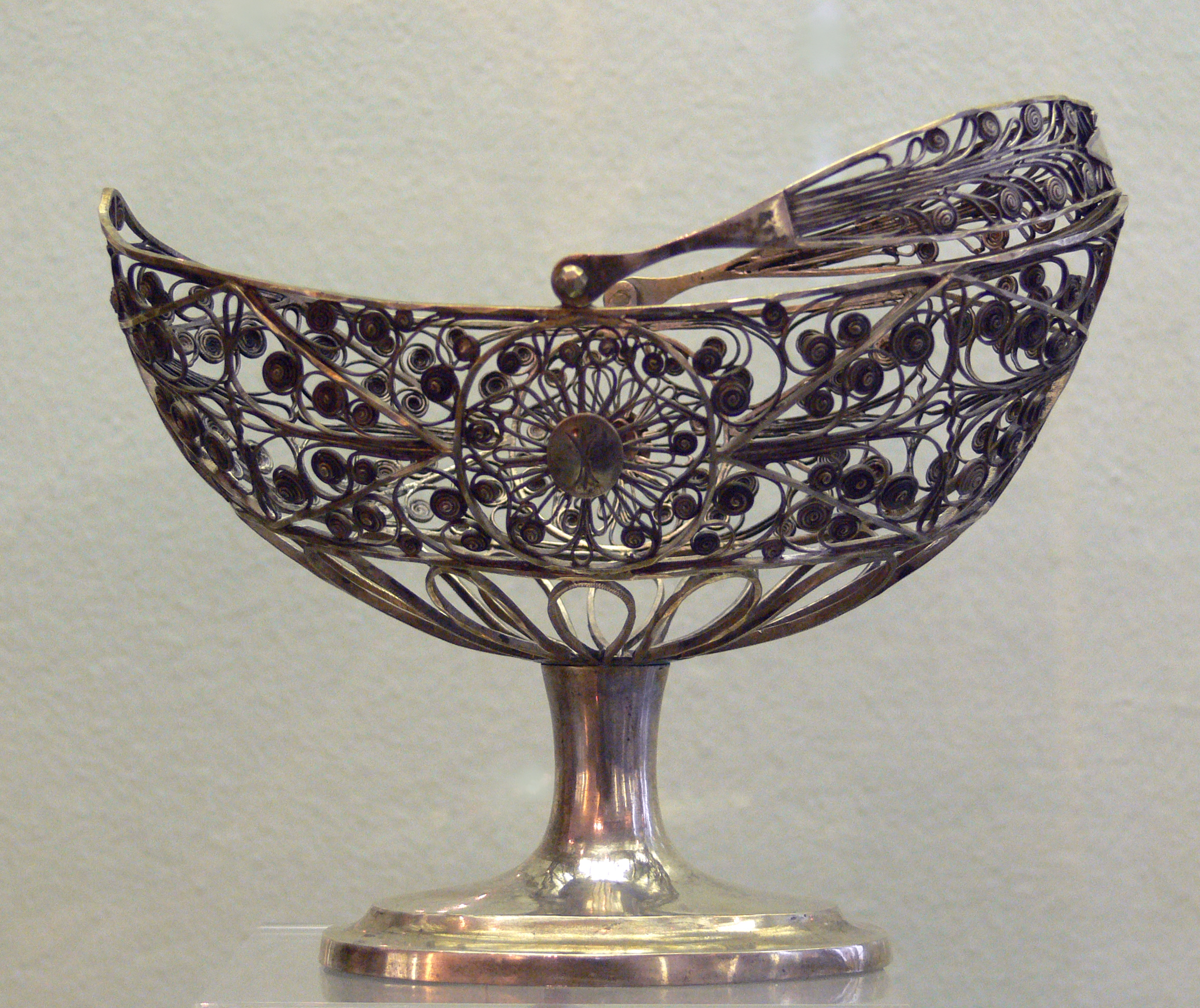
Sugar as a luxury item was often displayed in expensive items such as this 1810 silver filigree basket

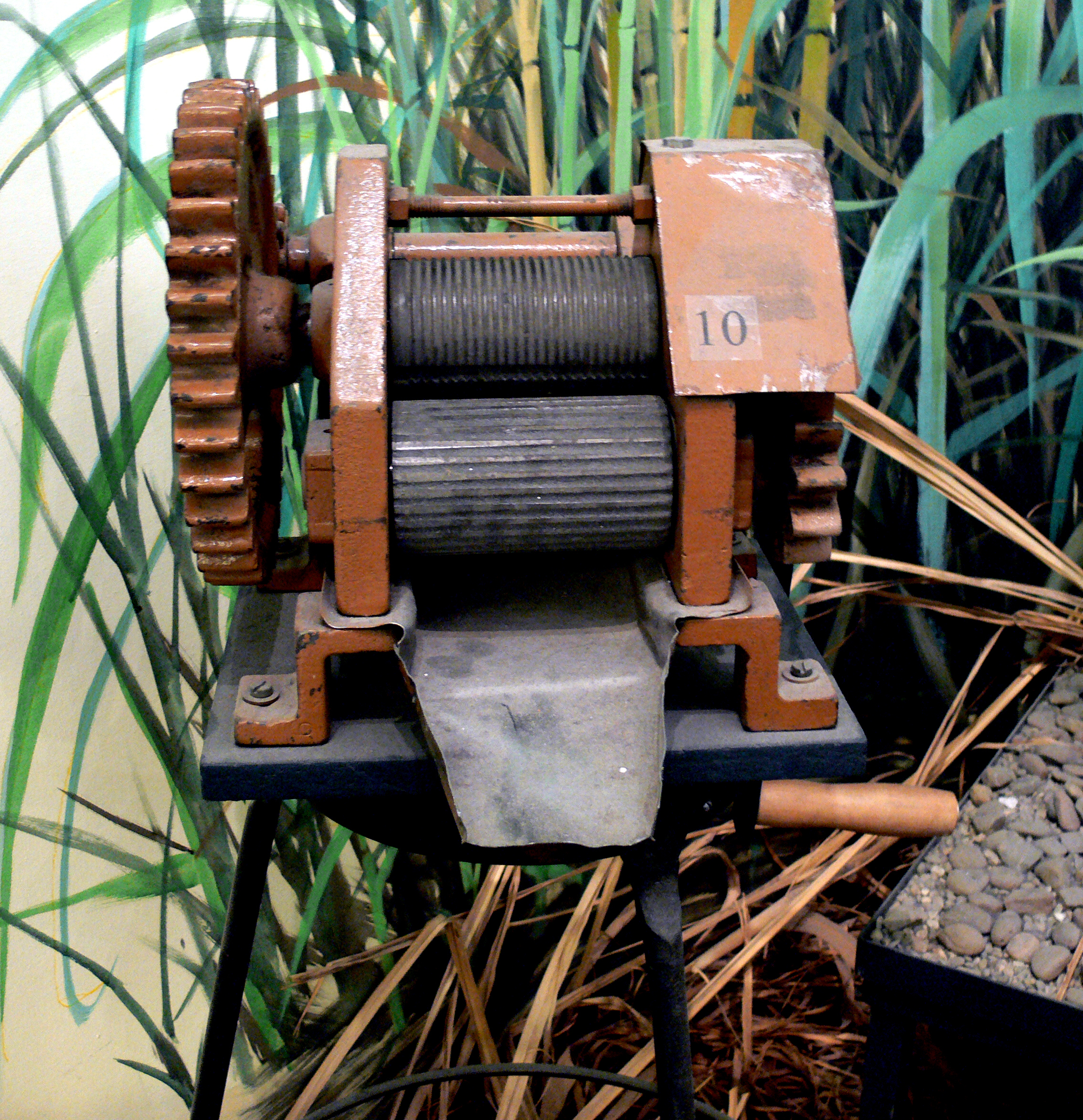
Small sugarcane mill with hand crank, Brazil (second half of 19th century)

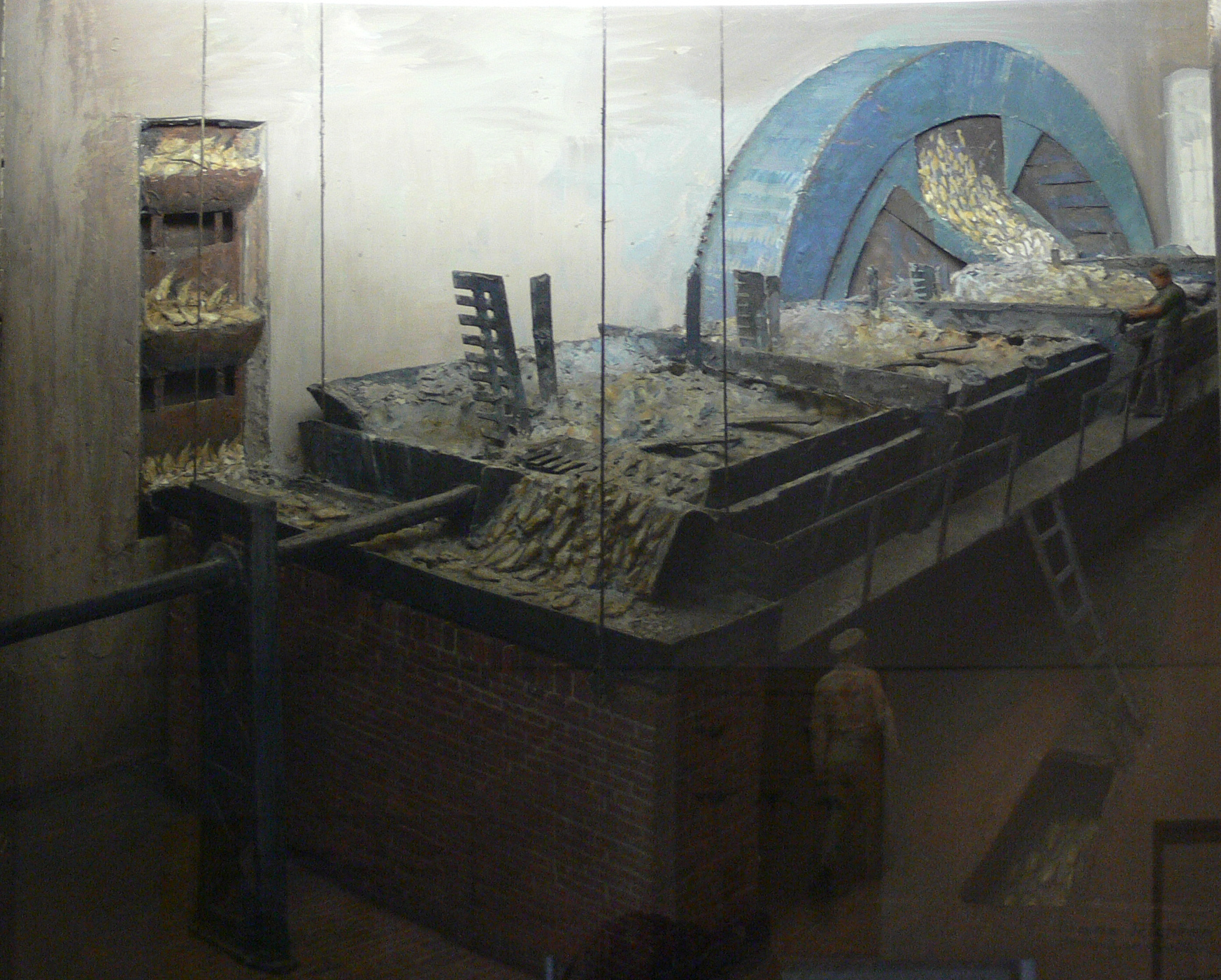
Washing sugar beets, from dioramas showing a 1928 sugar factory in Nauen

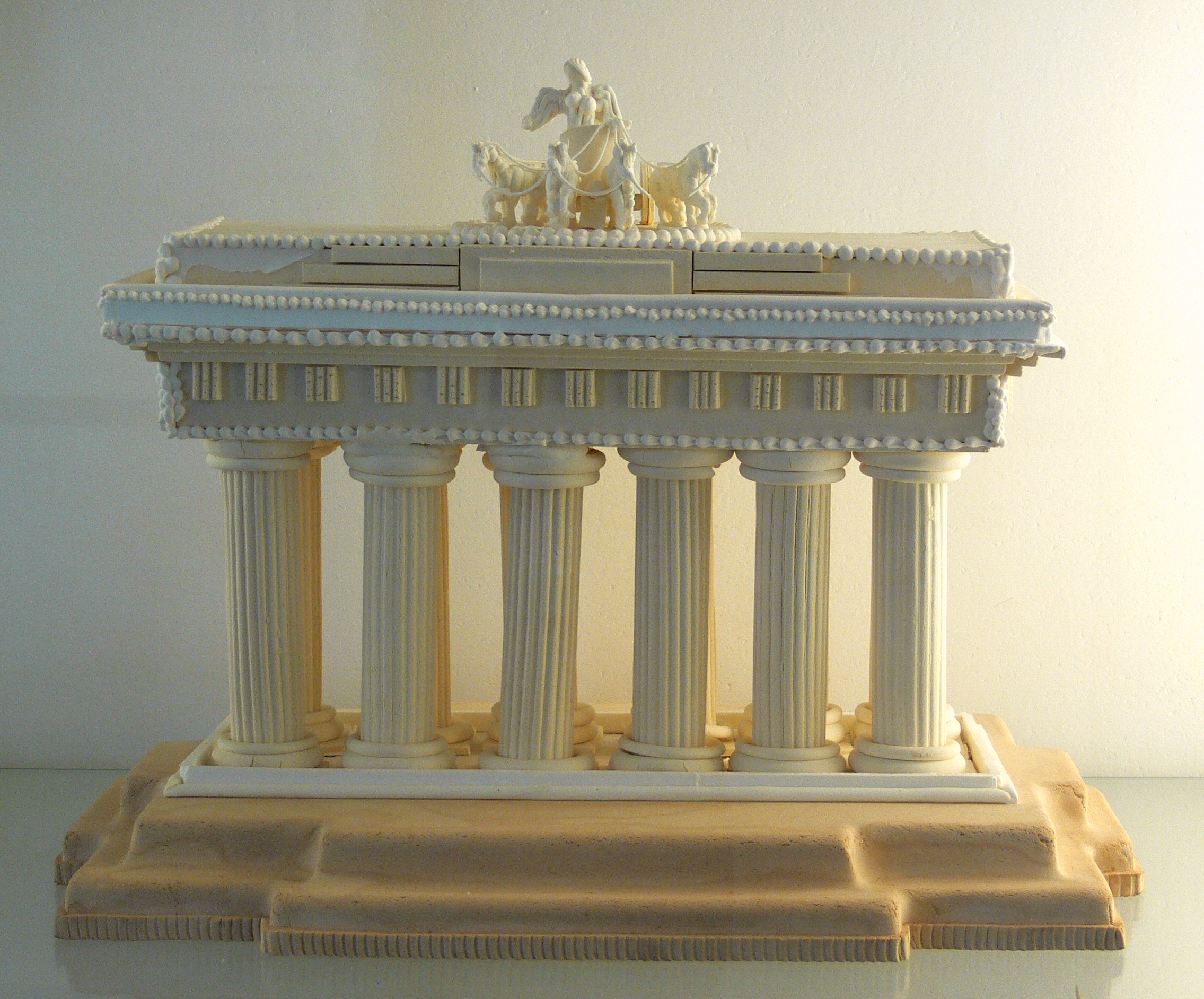
Model in sugar of Berlin's Brandenburg Gate

== See also ==
- History of sugar
- List of museums and galleries in Berlin

== Sources ==
- Hubert Olbrich. Zucker-Museum: anläßlich der Wiedereröffnung am 22. September 1989. Schriften aus dem Zucker-Museum. Berlin: Zucker-Museum, 1989. OCLC 602985912 (in German)
- Hermann Dressler and Hubert Olbrich, eds. Zucker-Museum im Berliner Zucker-Institut: Katalog. Beiträge zur Entwicklungsgeschichte der Zuckerwirtschaft und der Zuckerindustrie 5. Berlin: Institut für Zuckerindustrie, 1975. OCLC 636638403 (in German)
