= Hydrochloric acid regeneration =

Chemical process

Hydrochloric acid regeneration or HCl regeneration is a chemical process for the reclamation of bound and unbound HCl from metal chloride solutions such as hydrochloric acid.

== Field of application ==
The commercially most relevant field of application for HCl regeneration processes is the recovery of HCl from waste pickle liquors from carbon-steel pickling lines. Other applications include the production of metal oxides such as, but not limited, to Al_{2}O_{3} and MgO, as well as rare-earth oxides, by pyrohydrolysis of aqueous metal chloride or rare-earth chloride solutions.

A number of different process routes are available. The most widely used is based on pyrohydrolysis and adiabatic absorption of hydrogen chloride in water, a process invented in the 1960s. However tightening environmental standards and stringent air permit policies render it increasingly difficult to establish new pyrohydrolysis-based acid regeneration plants.

== Known processes ==
The following processes for the regeneration of HCl from spent pickle liquors have been adopted by the ferrous metals processing industry:

=== Regeneration ===
- Pyrohydrolysis
  - Spray roaster pyrohydrolysis
  - Fluidised bed pyrohydrolysis
- Hydrothermal regeneration
- Electrolytic Fe precipitation

=== Recovery of free HCl ===
- Retardation
- Dialysis
- Ion exchange

=== Transformation of FeCl_{2} to FeCl_{3} ===
- Electrolytic oxidation
- Chemical oxidation

== Hydrothermal regeneration ==
Hydrothermal hydrolysis of hydrochloric SPL from carbon-steel pickling lines is a hydrometallurgical reaction, which takes place according to the following chemical formula:

=== Step 1: oxidation ===
12 FeCl_{2} + 3 O_{2} → 8 FeCl_{3} + 2 Fe_{2}O_{3}

=== Step 2: hydrolysis ===
2 FeCl_{3} + 3 H_{2}O → 6 HCl + Fe_{2}O_{3}

Today hydrothermal hydrolysis, which operates at very low temperatures, consumes only a fraction of the energy other processes demand and produces virtually no emissions, is considered the most effective way to regenerate any given quantity of spent pickle liquor.

=== Advantages ===
- low energy consumption (about 1300 kJ per litre waste acid)
- no gaseous emissions
- wide operating range (10 to 100% of nominal capacity)
- high-value byproduct (>20 m^{3}/g BET specific surface; >2 kg/L specific weight; <0.05% water-soluble chlorides)
- theoretically unlimited operating capacity

=== Known implementations ===
Known implementations of the hydrothermal HCl regeneration processes include the PORI process (1974 for J&L Steel, dismantled) and the optimized SMS Demag wet process (2008 for ThyssenKrupp Steel, under construction).

== Pyrohydrolysis of spent pickle liquor ==
Pyrohydrolysis of hydrochloric spent pickle liquor from carbon steel pickling lines is a hydrometallurgical reaction which takes place according to the following chemical formulae:

4 FeCl_{2} + 4 H_{2}O + O_{2} = 8 HCl + 2 Fe_{2}O_{3}

2 FeCl_{3} + 3 H_{2}O = 6 HCl + Fe_{2}O_{3}

The process is an inversion of the chemical descaling (pickling) process.

=== Main differences between different implementations of pyrohydrolytic acid regeneration ===
- Furnace Type (spray roaster, fluidised bed or combined furnace)
- Physical Properties of Iron Oxide By-Product (ferric oxide powder or pellets)
- Purity and commercial value of Iron Oxide By-Product
  - Cl content
  - SiO_{2} content (typically 40 to 1000 ppm)
  - other impurities
  - specific weight (typically 0.3 to 4 kg per litre)
  - specific surface (typically 0.01 to 8 m2/g)
- Energy Consumption (between 600 and 1200 kcal/L)
- Fuel type
- Concentration of regenerated acid (typically approx. 18% wt/wt)
- Purity of regenerated acid (remaining Fe content, Cl content)
- Recovery efficiency (typically 99%)
- Rinse water utilization
- Stack emissions (HCl, Cl_{2}, Dust, CO, NOx)
- Liquid effluents (composition, amount)

=== Process description of spray roaster hydrochloric acid regeneration plant ===
==== Preconcentration ====
The metal chloride solution (in the most common case waste pickle liquor from a carbon steel pickling line) is fed to the venturi evaporator (III), where direct mass and heat exchange with the hot roast gas from the roaster (reactor/cyclone) takes place. The separator (IV) separates the gas and liquid phase of the venturi evaporator product. The liquid phase is re-circulated back to the venturi evaporator to increase mass and heat exchange performance.

- approx. 25 to 30% of the waste acid (H_{2}O, HCl) are evaporated
- roast gas is cooled down to approx. 92 to 96 °C
- dust particles are removed from the roast gas

==== Roasting ====
Preconcentrated waste acid from the preconcentrator (III / IV) is injected into the reactor (I) by means of one or more spray booms (VIII) bearing one or more injection nozzles each. Injection takes place at reactor top at a pressure between 4 and 10 bar. The reactor is directly fired by tangentially mounted burners that create a hot swirl. Temperatures inside the reactor vary between 700 °C (burner level) and 370 °C (roast gas exit duct). In the reactor the conversion of droplets of preconcentrated waste acid into iron oxide powder and hydrogen chloride gas takes place. Hydrogen Chloride leaves the reactor through the top, while iron oxide powder is removed from the reactor bottom by means of mechanical extraction devices. A cyclone (II) in the roast gas duct ensures separation and feed back of larger oxide particles carried by the roast gas.

==== Absorption ====
In the absorption column (V) the hydrogen chloride compound of the saturated roast gas leaving the preconcentrator is adiabatically absorbed in water (which in many cases is acid rinse water from a carbon steel pickling line). Regenerated acid (typical strength: 18% wt/wt) is collected at absorption column bottom.

==== Exhaust gas treatment ====
The roast gas is conveyed through the system by means of an exhaust gas fan (VI). Fans in plants provide pressure increases of approx. 200 mbar and are feedback-controlled to maintain a relative pressure of −3 mbar between reactor and atmosphere to avoid any overpressure-related leakage of acid gas. To rinse the impeller and cool the gas as well as to remove remaining traces of HCl from the roast gas, the exhaust gas fan is commonly supplied with quenching water, which is separated from the exhaust gas stream by means of a mist eliminator (VII) at the pressure side of the fan. In a final scrubber, commonly consisting of a combination of wet scrubbers such as venturi scrubbers (IX) and scrubber columns (X), remaining traces of HCl and dust are removed. In some plant, absorption chemicals such as NaOH and Na_{2}S_{2}O_{3} are used to bind HCl and Cl_{2} (which is created under certain circumstances in several, but not all spray roasting reactors).

=== Environmental impact ===
Pyrohydrolysis based acid regeneration processes produce a considerable amount of stack emissions containing HCl, particles and chlorine, which has led to numerous violations of the U.S. clean air act in the past.
