= Pickling (metal) =

Metal surface treatment using chemical removal of surface impurities

Pickling silver

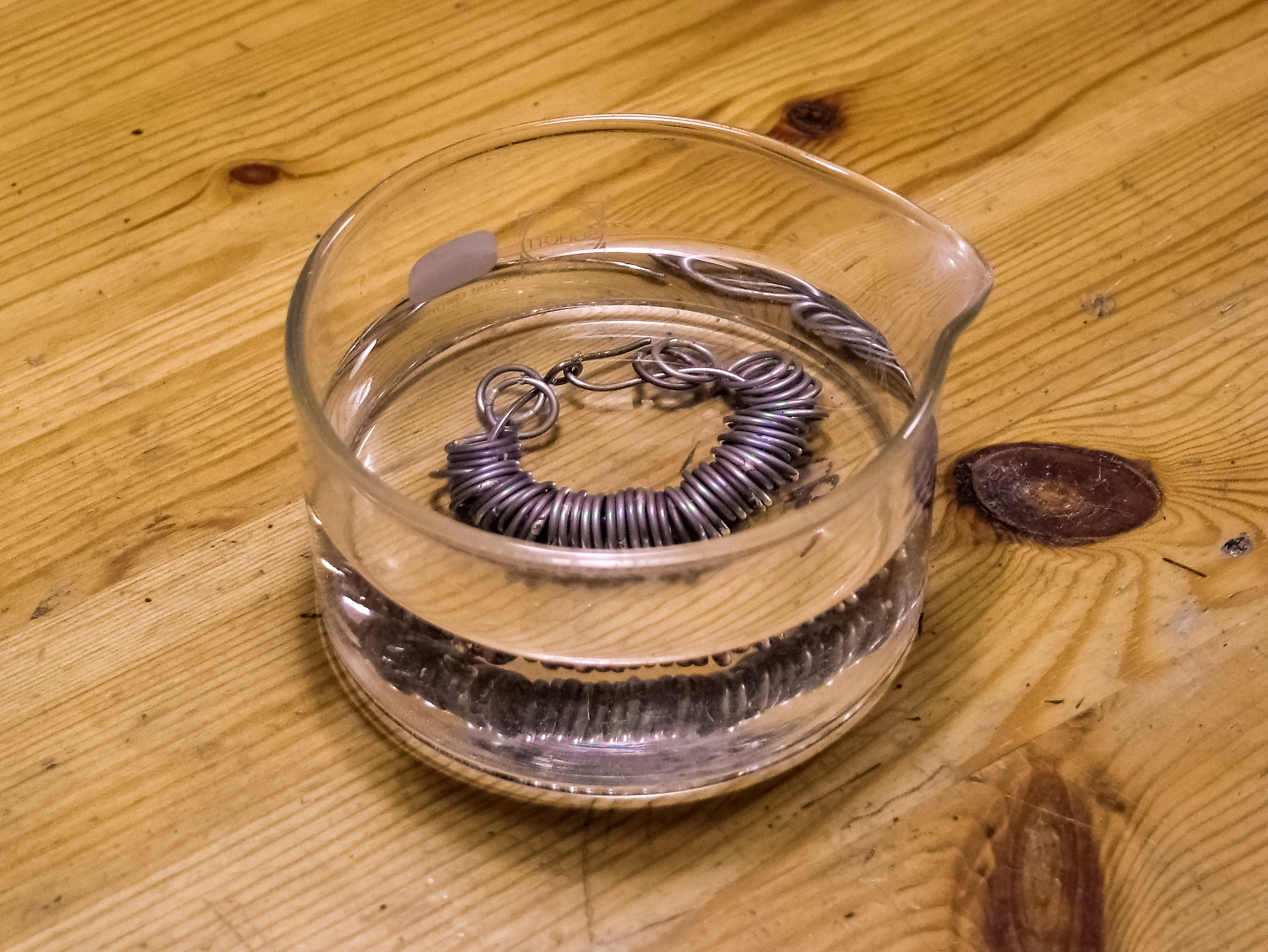
Hard soldered silver rings placed in diluted sulfuric acid...

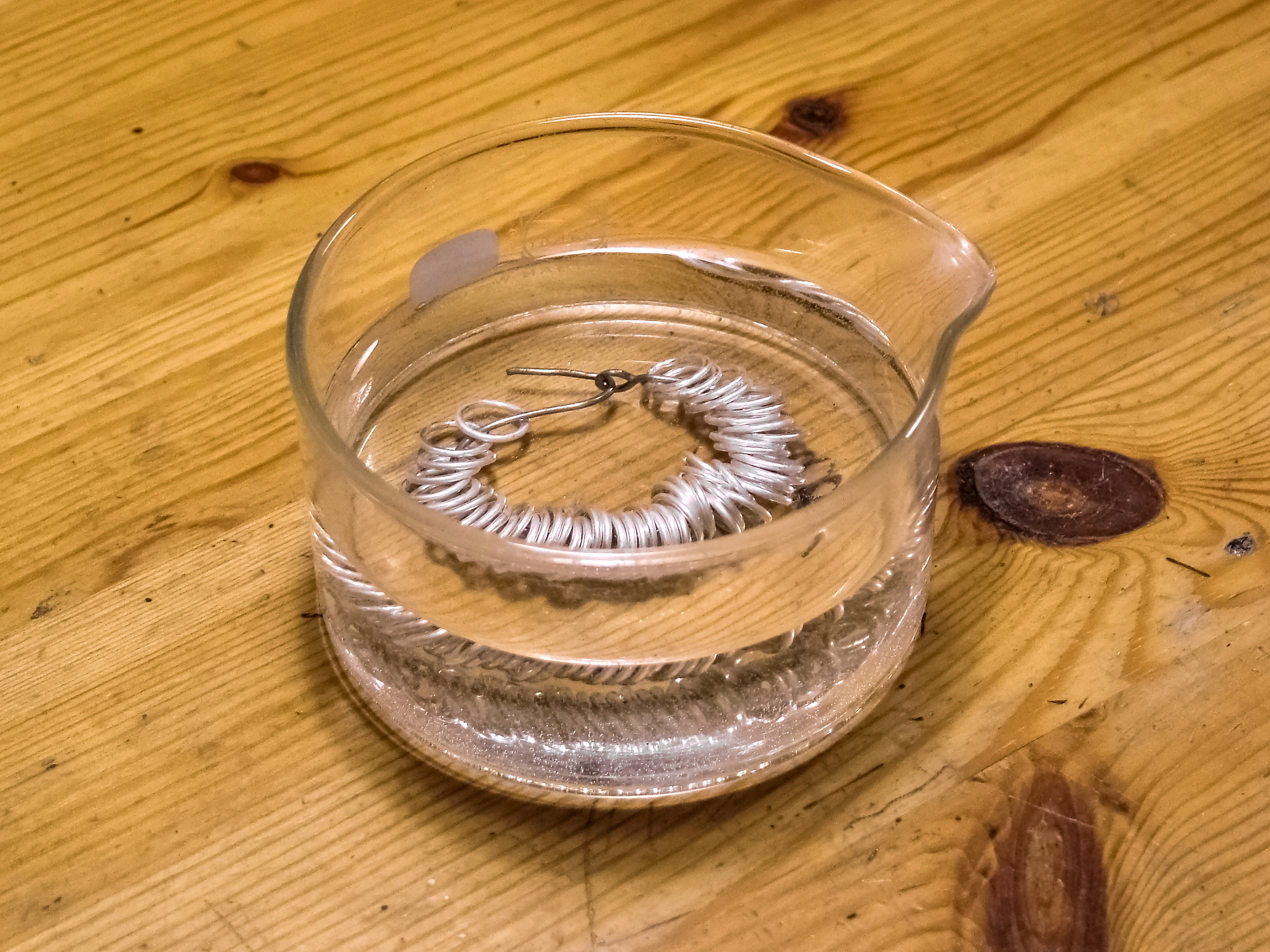
... to remove oxide and flux.

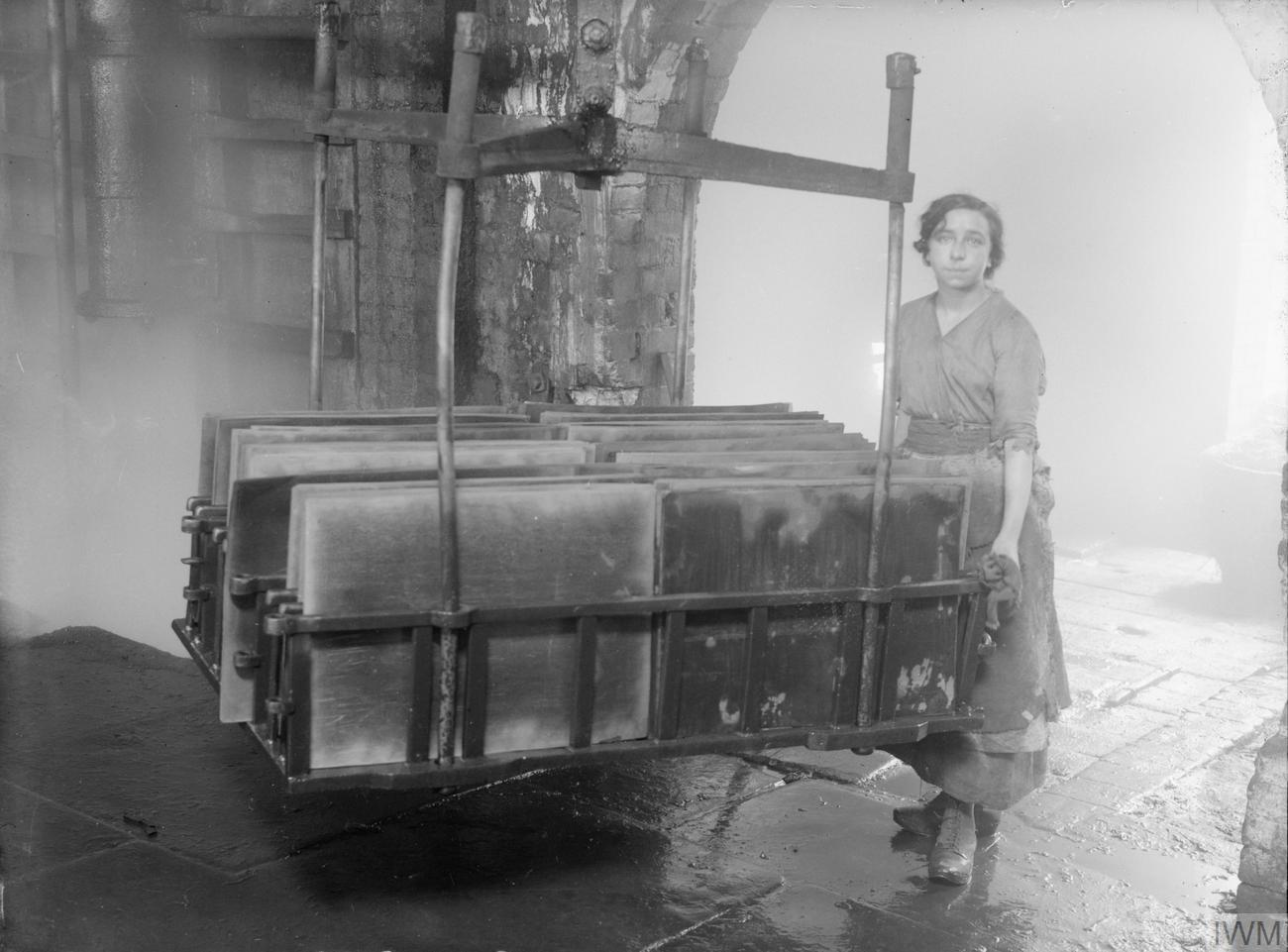
A worker moves sheets of tin for pickling in a tin factory in South Wales during World War I

Pickling is a metal surface treatment used to remove impurities, such as stains, inorganic contaminants, and rust or scale from ferrous metals, copper, precious metals and aluminium alloys. A solution called pickle liquor, which usually contains acid, is used to remove the surface impurities. It is commonly used to descale or clean steel in various steelmaking processes.

== Process ==
Metal surfaces can contain impurities that may affect usage of the product or further processing like plating with metal or painting. Various chemical solutions are usually used to clean these impurities. Strong acids, such as hydrochloric acid and sulfuric acid are common, but different applications use various other acids. Alkaline solutions can also be used for cleaning metal surfaces. Solutions usually also contain additives such as wetting agents and corrosion inhibitors. Pickling is sometimes called acid cleaning if descaling is not needed.

Many hot working processes and other processes that occur at high temperatures leave a discoloring oxide layer or scale on the surface. In order to remove the scale the workpiece is dipped into a vat of pickle liquor. Prior to cold rolling operation, hot rolled steel is normally passed through a pickling line so as to eradicate the scale from the surface.

The primary acid used in steelmaking is hydrochloric acid, although sulfuric acid was previously more common. Hydrochloric acid is more expensive than sulfuric acid, but it pickles much faster while minimizing base metal loss. The speed is a requirement for integration in automatic steel mills that run production at speeds as high as 800 ft/min (≈243 metres/min).

Carbon steels, with an alloy content less than or equal to 6%, are often pickled in hydrochloric or sulfuric acid. Steels with an alloy content greater than 6% must be pickled in two steps and other acids are used, such as phosphoric, nitric and hydrofluoric acid. Rust- and acid-resistant chromium-nickel steels are pickled traditionally in a bath of hydrofluoric and nitric acid. Most copper alloys are pickled in dilute sulfuric acid, but brass is pickled in concentrated sulfuric and nitric acid mixed with sodium chloride and soot.

In jewelry making, pickling is used to remove the copper oxide layer that results from heating copper and sterling silver during soldering and annealing. A diluted sulfuric acid pickling bath is traditionally used, but may be replaced with citric acid.

Sheet steel that undergoes acid pickling will oxidize (rust) when exposed to atmospheric conditions of moderately high humidity. For this reason, a thin film of oil or similar waterproof coating is applied to create a barrier to moisture in the air. This oil film must later be removed for many fabrication, plating or painting processes.

== Disadvantages ==
Acid cleaning has limitations in that it is difficult to handle because of its corrosiveness, and it is not applicable to all steels. Hydrogen embrittlement becomes a problem for some alloys and high-carbon steels. The hydrogen from the acid reacts with the surface and makes it brittle, causing cracks. Because of its high reactivity with treatable steels, acid concentrations and solution temperatures must be kept under control to ensure desired pickling rates.

=== Waste products ===
Pickling sludge is the waste product from pickling, and includes acidic rinse waters, iron chlorides, and metallic salts and waste acid. Spent pickle liquor is considered a hazardous waste by the EPA. Pickle sludge from steel processes is usually neutralized with lime and disposed of in a landfill since the EPA no longer deems it a hazardous waste after neutralization. The lime neutralization process raises the pH of the spent acid. The waste material is subject to a waste determination to ensure no characteristic or listed waste is present. Since the 1960s, hydrochloric pickling sludge is often treated in a hydrochloric acid regeneration system, which recovers some of the hydrochloric acid and ferric oxide. The rest must still be neutralized and disposed of in land fills or managed as a hazardous waste based on the waste profile analysis. The by-products of nitric acid pickling are marketable to other industries, such as fertilizer processors.

== Alternatives ==
Alternative methods include also mechanical cleaning such as abrasive blasting, grinding, wire brushing, hydrocleaning and laser cleaning. These methods generally do not provide as clean a surface as pickling does.

== See also ==
- Cosmoline
- Hot-dip galvanization
- Jewelling
- Phosphate conversion coating
- Quench polish quench
