= Hydrochloric acid (data page) =

Chemical data page

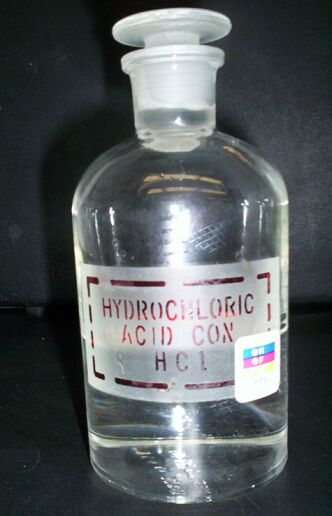
Hydrochloric acid

This page provides supplementary chemical data on Hydrochloric acid.

== Material Safety Data Sheet ==
The handling of this chemical may incur notable safety precautions. It is highly recommend that you seek the Material Safety Datasheet (MSDS) for this chemical from a reliable source and follow its directions.

== Structure and properties ==
Structure and properties
Index of refraction, n_{D}	?
Abbe number	?
Dielectric constant, ε_{r}	? ε_{0} at ? °C
Bond strength	?
Bond length	127.4 pm
Bond angle	180
Magnetic susceptibility	?

This box:
- Except where noted otherwise, data relate to Standard temperature and pressure.
- Reliability of data general note.
