= Edmund Oscar von Lippmann =

German chemist and natural science historian (1857–1940)

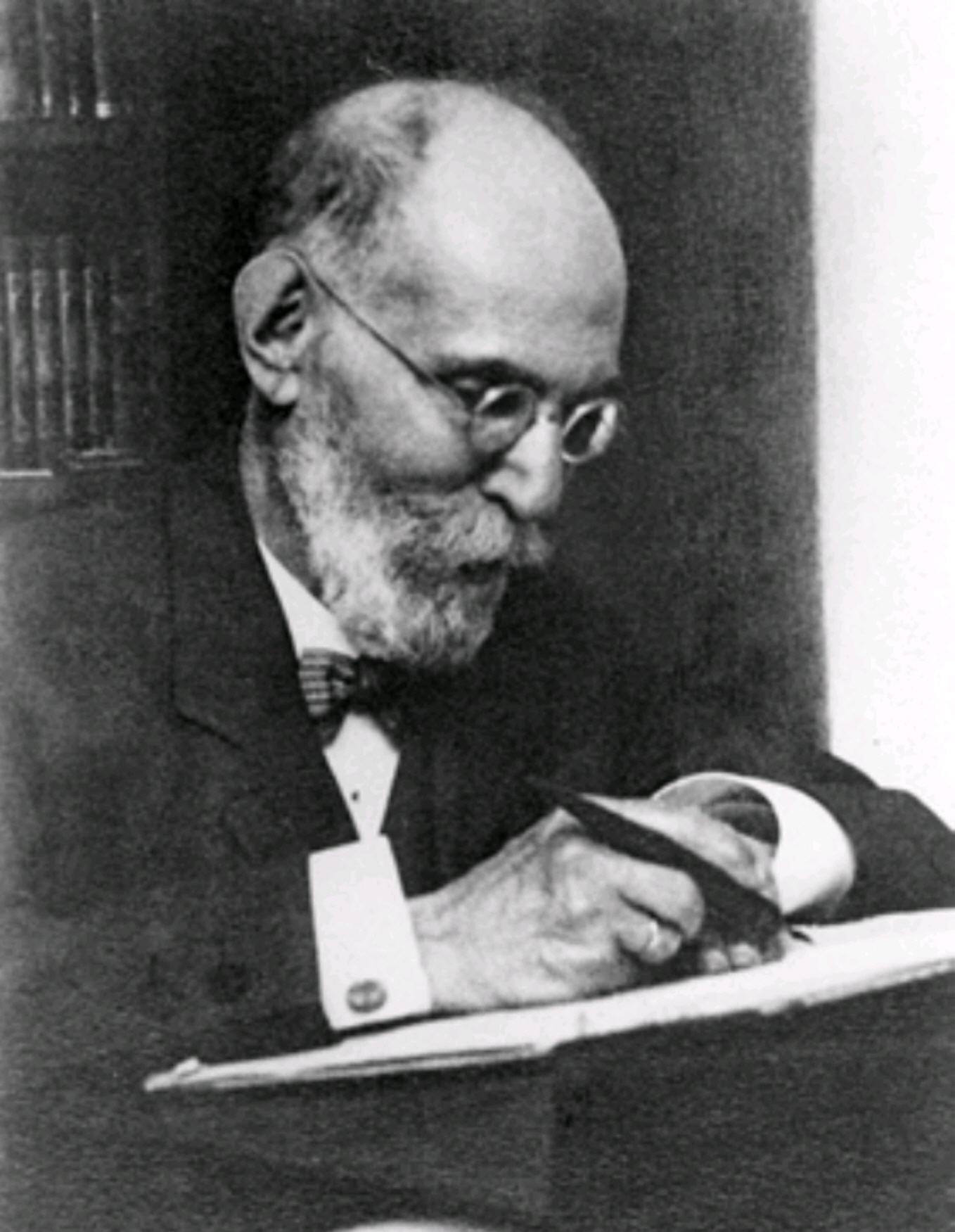
Edmund Oscar von Lippmann, c. 1920

Edmund Oscar von Lippmann (9 January 1857 in Vienna – 24 September 1940 in Halle) was a German chemist and natural science historian. For his writings, he was awarded multiple honoris causa doctorates from German universities, as well as the Leibniz Medal and the Sudhoff Medal.

== Biography ==
He studied at the ETH Zurich and obtained a doctorate in 1878 under Robert Bunsen at the Heidelberg University. Lippmann ran large sugar refineries, in Duisburg and later in Halle. During this phase of his career, he was granted the title of professor in the year 1901. In 1904, Lippmann founded the Berlin Sugar Museum, which closed in 2012.

In 1878 Lippmann published his first edition of what would become a reference monograph on sugar chemistry in his time. The 3rd edition of this work, published in 1904 in two volumes was 2000 pages long and attempted to cover every aspect of what had become a vast field. A contemporary review in Science noted that "With a modesty as charming as it is rare, he states in his preface: 'Completeness could not be attained in any direction', and yet this work is the most thorough of all works ever published on the chemistry of sugars", concluding that it was "rivaled by few, excelled by none".

In 1890 Lippmann wrote an extremely detailed and influential history of sugar processing, Geschichte des Zuckers: seiner Darstellung und Verwendung, seit den ältesten Zeiten bis zum Beginn der Rübenzucker Fabrikation (History of sugar from the ancient times until the beginning of beet sugar production). To make it more accessible, he wrote an abridged version in 1894, which was also translated in French. In 1929 he published an updated version of his initial volume (824 pp). Although an influential work in its day, 21st century scholars found it to be misleading with respect to sugar production in the Middle Ages.

Lippmann also wrote extensively on the history of alchemy, from the perspective of it being a forerunner of chemistry rather than more philosophical considerations. His three-volume Entstehung und Ausbreitung der Alchemie (Origin and propagation of Alchemy) is considered to contain the most detailed account of Greek alchemy, superseding earlier accounts of Marcellin Berthelot and C. Ruelle in accuracy. In 1920, George Sarton wrote in his review of the first volume that it was a "truly monumental work, the greatest single addition to our knowledge of ancient chemistry (and also to our knowledge of human superstition) since the days of Kopp". In a review of the 1931 volume, Sarton warned that the portion dealing with Arabic materials was of lesser quality than the rest, particularly with respect to spelling of Arabic names. Yet more recent reevaluations point to some deficiencies in citation style that make the text difficult to follow back to primary sources. More compact accounts have been written since.

== Publications ==
- Die Zuckerarten und ihre Derivate (1878)
- Die Chemie der Zuckerarten (1885, 1904)
- Geschichte des Zuckers (1890, 1929)
- Abhandlungen und Vorträge zur Geschichte der Naturwissenschaft (1906–1913)
- Entstehung und Ausbreitung der Alchemie, (1919, 1931, 1954) Digital edition of Vol. 1&2 by the University and State Library Düsseldorf
- Zeittafeln zur Geschichte der organischen Chemie (1921)
- Beiträge zur Geschichte der Naturwissenschaft und der Technik (1923)
- Geschichte der Rübe als Kulturpflanze (1925)
- Guntwin Bruhns (Hrsg.), Aus den Lebenserinnerungen von E. O. von Lippmann. In: Zuckerindustrie 107. bis 119. Jg., 1982–1994.
