= Archduchess Agnes Maria of Austria =

Austrian archduchess (1891–1945)

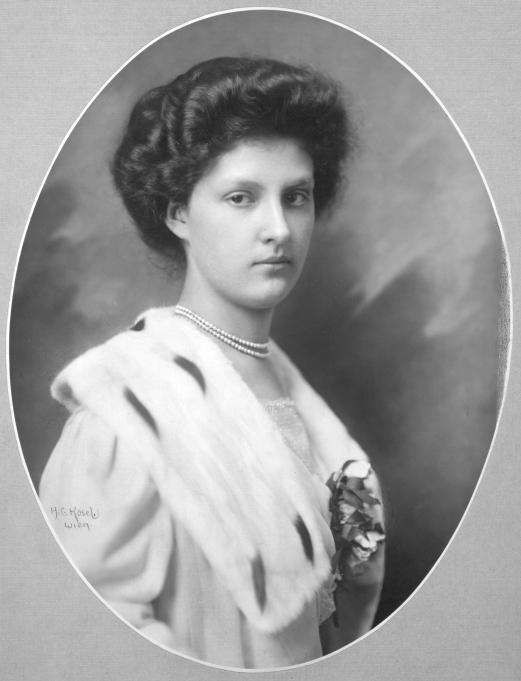
- Agnes Maria, circa 1914
- Born: 26 March 1891; Salzburg, Austria-Hungary
- Died: 4 October 1945 (aged 54); Schwertberg, Upper Austria, Austria
- Burial: 8 Octorber 1945; Friedhof Sankt Gilgen, Salzburg, Austria
Names
- Agnes Maria Theresia Ferdinanda Alice Antonia Josepha Ludovika Anna Amalie Germana Emanuela
- House: House of Habsburg-Lorraine
- Father: Ferdinand IV, Grand Duke of Tuscany
- Mother: Princess Alice of Bourbon-Parma
- Religion: Roman Catholicism

Archduchess Agnes Maria of Austria (26 March 1891 – 4 October 1945) was a member of the Tuscan line of the House of Habsburg-Lorraine. Born in Salzburg, she was the youngest daughter of Ferdinand IV, Grand Duke of Tuscany, and his second wife, Princess Alice of Bourbon-Parma.

== Early life ==
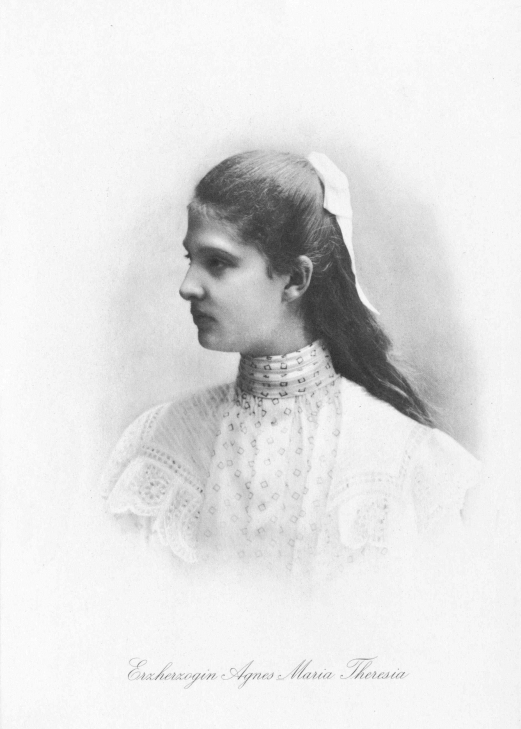
Archuchess Agnes in her youth, 1900s.

Archduchess Agnes Maria was born on 26 March 1891 in Salzburg, during the exile of her family from the former Grand Duchy of Tuscany. She was the youngest daughter of Ferdinand IV, Grand Duke of Tuscany, and his second wife, Princess Alice of Bourbon-Parma. Following the high-profile divorce and scandal of her eldest sister, Louise , in 1903, the family dynamics shifted significantly. Her sister Louise later recalled that their mother blamed this scandal for ruining the marriage prospects of the younger daughters, writing in her memoir:

I am told that ever since my divorce, mamma has put all the blame on me for the fact that my sisters still remain spinsters, and maintains that my "impossible conduct" makes probably suitors wary of marrying into our family. I think it is a great pity that they do not marry, for they are sweet, amiable creatures, who, luckily for themselves, do not possess those Habsburg eccentricities which Leopold and I have inherited.

== Later life and death ==
Following the end of the First World War and the collapse of the Austro-Hungarian Empire in 1918, the family's official status changed dramatically. To remain in the Republic of Austria, members of the former imperial family were required to renounce their dynastic privileges. In late 1918, Agnes Maria, along with her mother, Archduchess Alice, and her unmarried older sisters, Margarethe and Germana, relocated to Schloss Schwertberg in Upper Austria, where they established a highly secluded lifestyle often described by contemporary accounts as a mock-convent.

Agnes Maria remained unmarried throughout her entire life. She survived the death of her mother in 1935 and witnessed the turbulent years of World War II while living quietly in Upper Austria. She died at Schloss Schwertberg on 4 October 1945, shortly after the conclusion of the war, and was buried within the family cemetery plot designated for the Tuscan line.

== Ancestry ==
Ancestors of Archduchess Agnes Maria of Austria

8. Ferdinand III, Grand Duke of Tuscany
4. Leopold II, Grand Duke of Tuscany
9. Princess Luisa of Naples and Sicily
2. Ferdinand IV, Grand Duke of Tuscany
10. Francis I of the Two Sicilies
5. Princess Maria Antonia of the Two Sicilies
11. Maria Isabella of Spain
1. Archduchess Agnes Maria of Austria
12. Charles II, Duke of Parma
6. Charles III, Duke of Parma
13. Princess Maria Teresa of Savoy
3. Princess Alice of Bourbon-Parma
14. Charles Ferdinand, Duke of Berry
7. Princess Louise d'Artois
15. Princess Caroline of Naples and Sicily

== Bibliography ==
- McIntosh, David (2000). The Unknown Habsburgs. Höganäs: Rosvall Royal Books. ISBN 978-9197397803.
- Hamann, Brigitte (1988). Die Habsburger: Ein biographisches Lexikon. Vienna: Ueberreuter. ISBN 978-3800032471.
