= Princess Alice of Bourbon-Parma (1849–1935) =

Titular Grand Duchess of Tuscany

- Grand Duchess consort of Tuscany (titular)
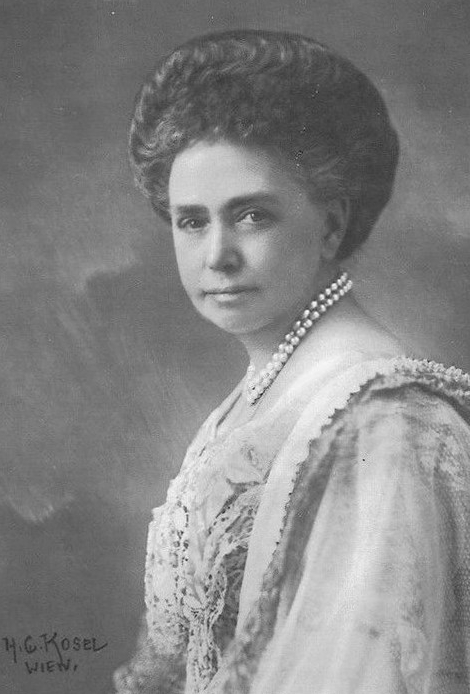
- Photograph, c. 1870–1880
- Tenure: 11 January 1868 – 17 January 1908
- Born: 27 December 1849; Parma, Italy
- Died: 16 January 1935 (aged 85); Schwertberg, Austria
- Spouse: Ferdinand IV, Grand Duke of Tuscany (m. 1868; died 1908)
- Issue: Archduke Leopold Ferdinand; Louise, Crown Princess of Saxony; Archduke Josef Ferdinand; Archduke Peter Ferdinand; Archduke Heinrich Ferdinand; Anna Maria, Princess of Hohenlohe-Bartenstein; Archduchess Margareta Maria; Archduchess Germana Maria; Archduke Robert Ferdinand; Archduchess Agnes Maria
- House: Bourbon-Parma
- Father: Charles III, Duke of Parma
- Mother: Princess Louise d'Artois

Princess Alice Marie Caroline Ferdinanda Rachel Johanna Philomena of Bourbon-Parma (27 December 1849 – 16 January 1935) was Grand Duchess of Tuscany through her marriage to Ferdinand IV, Grand Duke of Tuscany. She was also the third child of Charles III, Duke of Parma, and Princess Louise d'Artois. Her older brother was Robert I, Duke of Parma, making her an aunt of Empress Zita.

== Early life ==
Princess Alice, or "Alix", was born in Parma in 1849 as the third child and second daughter of Charles III, Duke of Parma and Princess Louise d'Artois, making her a great-granddaughter of the last king of France, Charles X. Her godparents were Ferdinand II of the Two Sicilies and her maternal grandmother, the Duchess of Berry. Her siblings were Margherita (known as "Meg"), Robert and Henry.

In March 1854, when Alice was four years old, her father was assassinated.

== Failed engagement and marriage ==
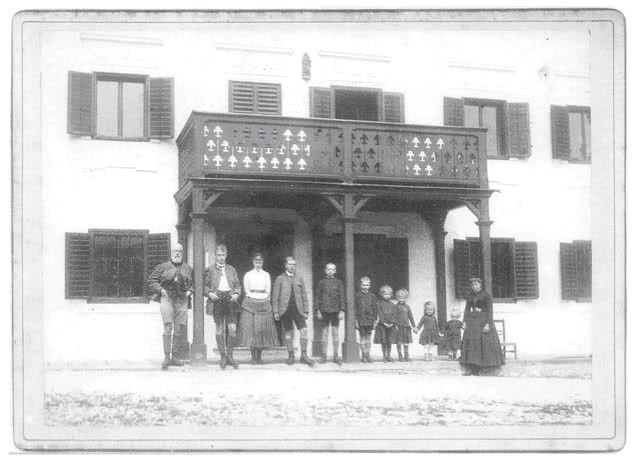
Alice with her husband and children, 1887.

An engagement was discussed between Princess Alice and the reigning prince of Liechtenstein, Johann II, in January 1864. It was broken off by Johann in December of that same year, after Alice's fifteenth birthday. Johann was homosexual, and Alice's young age may have also been a factor.

Eventually, an engagement was arranged between Princess Alice and Ferdinand IV, the deposed Grand Duke of Tuscany, who was fourteen years her senior, and who had been widowed. They were married on 11 January 1868, when Princess Alice was eighteen years old, at Frohsdorf Castle. Their first son was born less than nine months later. Together, they had ten children over twenty-three years. They were close friends of Emperor Franz Joseph I, who nicknamed them the Pearl-Fishers, because of the pearls sent as a gift to the couple at the birth of each child.

- Archduke Leopold Ferdinand (2 December 1868 – 4 July 1935). He renounced his titles on 29 December 1902 and took the name Leopold Wölfling. He married three times, without issue.
- Archduchess Louise (2 September 1870 – 23 March 1947). Married first King Frederick Augustus III of Saxony and after divorcing him married second Enrico Toselli and had issue by both marriages.
- Archduke Josef Ferdinand (24 May 1872 – 28 August 1942). He married, firstly, Rosa Kaltenbrunner and, after divorcing her married, secondly Gertrud Tomanek, by whom he had issue. Both marriages were morganatic.
- Archduke Peter Ferdinand of Austria (12 May 1874 – 8 November 1948). Married Princess Maria Cristina of Bourbon-Two Sicilies, and had issue.
- Archduke Heinrich Ferdinand (13 February 1878 – 21 May 1969). A major general in the Austrian army, morganatically married Maria Karoline Ludescher, and had issue – two sons and one daughter.
- Archduchess Anna Maria (17 October 1879 – 30 May 1961). She married Johannes, Prince of Hohenlohe-Bartenstein, who later developed insanity; they had three sons and three daughters.
- Archduchess Margareta Maria (13 October 1881 – 30 April 1965). Died unmarried.
- Archduchess Germana Maria (11 September 1884 – 3 November 1955). Died unmarried.
- Archduke Robert Ferdinand (15 October 1885 – 2 August 1895). Died aged 9.
- Archduchess Agnes Maria (26 March 1891 – 4 October 1945). Died unmarried.

== Later years and death ==
After her husband's death in 1908, Princess Alice retired to Schwertberg Castle with her three unmarried daughters, Margareta, Germana and Agnes. In her memoirs, her daughter Louise wrote:

I am told that ever since my divorce, mamma has put all the blame on me for the fact that my sisters still remain spinsters, and maintains that my "impossible conduct" makes probably suitors wary of marrying into our family. I think it is a great pity that they do not marry, for they are sweet, amiable creatures, who, luckily for themselves, do not possess those Habsburg eccentricities which Leopold and I have inherited.

After the First World War, some Habsburgs (including Alice) renounced their imperial titles so that they could continue to reside in Austria. Alice died in 1935, aged 85. She was survived by nine of her children, although she was no longer on speaking terms with her eldest two, Leopold and Louise, following their respective scandals. Leopold later wrote about his mother:

My mother bore ten children in all, and how she found time for so self-abnegating a process has long mystified me. Apparently her habit was to bear a child and then to see very little of it for the next few years. [...] The truth about Mother was that she should have been a nun. Fate sadly miscast her as the wife of a big, virile husband and the mother of many small turbulent children. Unsuited for the situation, she became almost as confused as the old woman in fable who lived in a shoe and had such a large family she did not know what to do. [...] Her sense of sin was so much an obsession that even the smallest childish trespass was magnified into a tremendous misdeed. [...] A product of her environment, she could not be blamed for being what she was: a fanatical bigot and so uncompromising a stickler for family tradition that she firmly believed all Royal people to belong to a species apart.

Leopold also claimed his mother's favourite child was her second son, Josef, despite his two morganatic marriages.

== Bibliography ==
Media related to Princess Alicia of Parma at Wikimedia Commons

- Nicolas Énache, , Paris, Éditions L'intervenant des chercheurs et curieux,1999, 795 pp. ISBN 978-2-908003-04-8.
- Jacques Parisot and Nelly Parisot, , Besançon, Éditions Christian,1984, 141 pp. ISBN 978-2-86496-014-0
- Jean-Fred Tourtchine, , vol. III, t. 11, Clamecy, Laballery Printing House,1992, 265 p..

Princess Alice of Bourbon-Parma (1849–1935) House of Bourbon-Parma Cadet branch of the House of Bourbon Born: 27 December 1849 Died: 16 January 1935
Titles in pretence
Vacant Title last held by Princess Maria Antonia of the Two Sicilies	— TITULAR — Grand Duchess of Tuscany; 11 January 1868 – 17 January 1908; Reason for succession failure: Italian Unification under the House of Savoy	Vacant Title next held by Princess Maria Cristina of Bourbon-Two Sicilies
