= Ferdinand IV =

Ferdinand IV is the name of:

- Ferdinand IV of Castile (1285–1312), king of Castile and León from 1295
- Ferdinand IV, King of the Romans (1633–1654, king of the Romans from 1653, of Bohemia from 1646, of Hungary from 1647)
- Ferdinand IV of Naples (1751–1825, king 1759–1799; 1799–1806; 1815–1816) (Ferdinand III of Sicily 1759–1816 and Ferdinand I of the Two Sicilies 1816–1825)
- Ferdinand IV, Grand Duke of Tuscany (1835–1908, grand-duke 1859–1860)
