= Archduchess Margareta of Austria =

Austrian archduchess (1881–1965)

Archduchess Margareta Maria of Austria
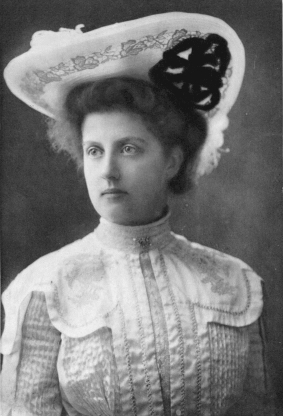
- Margareta, c. 1905
- Born: 13 October 1881; Salzburg, Austria-Hungary
- Died: 30 April 1965 (aged 83); Schwertberg, Austria
- Burial: Friedhof Sankt Gilgen, Salzburg, Austria
Names
- Margareta Maria Albertine Alice Ferdinanda Ludovika Antonia Leopolda Roberta Henrika Theresia Eduarda
- House: House of Habsburg-Lorraine
- Father: Ferdinand IV, Grand Duke of Tuscany
- Mother: Princess Alice of Bourbon-Parma
- Religion: Roman Catholicism

Archduchess Margareta Maria of Austria (13 October 1881 – 30 April 1965) was a member of the House of Habsburg-Tuscany.

== Early life ==
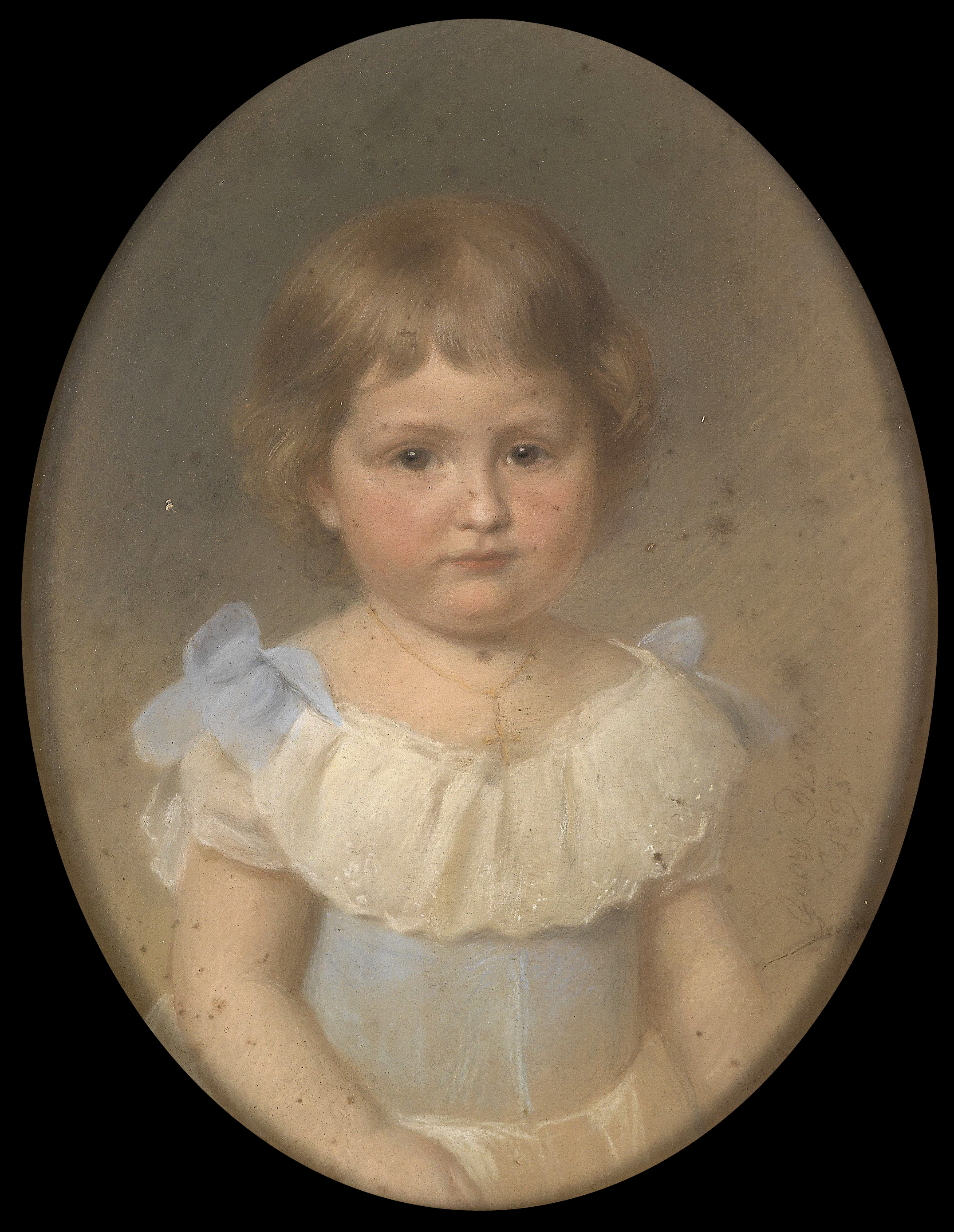
Portrait by Georg Decker, 1883.

She was born on 13 October 1881 in Salzburg as the daughter of Ferdinand IV, Grand Duke of Tuscany and his second wife Princess Alice of Bourbon-Parma. Margareta spent her childhood years dividing her time between her family's residences in Salzburg and the Villa Toskana in Lindau.Her elder sister, Louise, later described the domestic atmosphere and its restrictive impact on the sisters' marital prospects in her memoirs:

I am told that ever since my divorce, mamma has put all the blame on me for the fact that my sisters still remain spinsters, and maintains that my "impossible conduct" makes probably suitors wary of marrying into our family. I think it is a great pity that they do not marry, for they are sweet, amiable creatures, who, luckily for themselves, do not possess those Habsburg eccentricities which Leopold and I have inherited.

== Later life and death ==
Following the collapse of the Austro-Hungarian Monarchy in 1918, Archduchess Margareta Maria opted to remain in the newly formed Republic of Austria as a private citizen. She never married and chose to spend her remaining decades living in strict seclusion alongside her unmarried sisters at Schwertberg Castle in Upper Austria, where she remained until her death on 30 April 1965.

== Ancestry ==
Ancestors of Archduchess Margareta of Austria

8. Ferdinand III, Grand Duke of Tuscany
4. Leopold II, Grand Duke of Tuscany
9. Princess Luisa of Naples and Sicily
2. Ferdinand IV, Grand Duke of Tuscany
10. Francis I of the Two Sicilies
5. Princess Maria Antonia of the Two Sicilies
11. Maria Isabella of Spain
1. Archduchess Margareta of Austria
12. Charles II, Duke of Parma
6. Charles III, Duke of Parma
13. Princess Maria Teresa of Savoy
3. Princess Alice of Bourbon-Parma
14. Charles Ferdinand, Duke of Berry
7. Princess Louise d'Artois
15. Princess Caroline of Naples and Sicily

== Bibliography ==
- Wurzbach, Constant von (1888). "Toscana, Margarethe Marie Erzherzogin, geb. 1881". Biographisches Lexikon des Kaiserthums Oesterreich (in German). Vol. 46. Vienna: Kaiserlich-königliche Hof- und Staatsdruckerei.
