= Archduke Leopold Ferdinand of Austria =

Austrian archduke (1868–1935)

Archduke Leopold Ferdinand
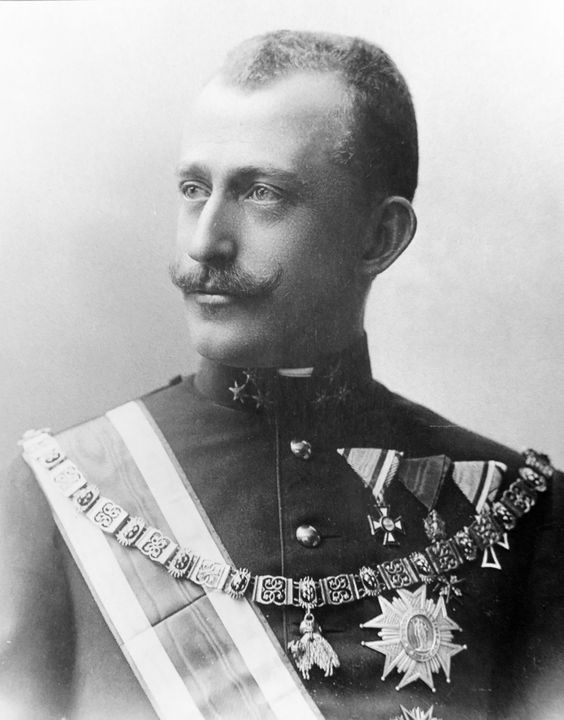
- Leopold Ferdinand in the 1890s
- Born: 2 December 1868; Salzburg, Duchy of Salzburg, Austria-Hungary
- Died: 4 July 1935 (aged 66); Berlin, Germany
- Spouse: Wilhelmine Adamovicz (m. 1903; div. 1907) Maria Ritter (m. 1907; div. 1916) Klara Pawlowski (m. 1933)
- Issue: One illegitimate daughter
Names
- Leopold Ferdinand Salvator Marie Joseph Johann Baptist Zenobius Rupprecht Ludwig Karl Jacob Vivian
- House: Habsburg-Lorraine
- Father: Ferdinand IV, Grand Duke of Tuscany
- Mother: Alice of Bourbon-Parma

Archduke Leopold Ferdinand of Austria (2 December 1868 – 4 July 1935) was the eldest son of Ferdinand IV, Grand Duke of Tuscany, and Alice of Bourbon-Parma.

== Early life ==
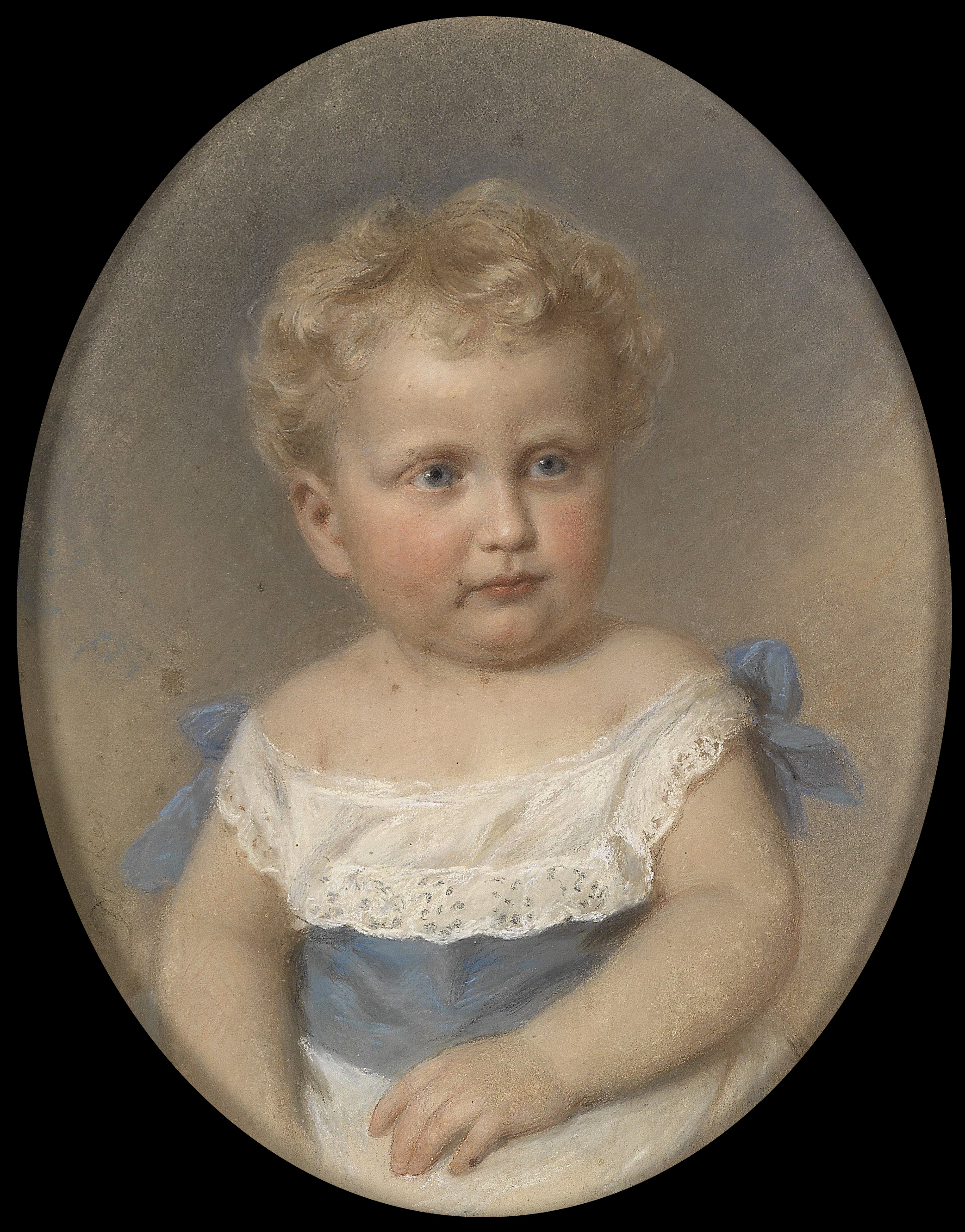
Leopold Ferdinand as a child, by Georg Decker

Leopold Ferdinand was the only member of the Austrian ruling family to train (at his own request) at the Imperial and Royal Naval Academy, entering it in 1883 and graduating at the top of his class in 1887. He later wrote that the Emperor Franz Joseph had given his consent reluctantly, seeing the naval officer corps as "a disgustingly democratic institution... largely composed of sons of the haute bourgeoisie", and believing that the academy's students would be unfit companions for a Habsburg prince.

While he was close to his father, he would later write of his mother, "who had never really loved me," that "Apparently her habit was to bear a child and then to see very little of it the next few years."

Both he and his sister Luisa (who would also become a scandalous figure in the royal family) were atheists. In her memoirs, Luisa describes being sexually assaulted by a priest, who'd been sent by her mother, before being rescued by Leopold. Leopold mentions the incident in his own memoirs, adding "Although my mother was unaware of his real nature, I had actual proof that he was one of those dark creatures, who use the cloak of Religion to cover their dark designs." Hearing Luisa scream, he then attacked the priest and threw him down the stairs.

Between 1885 and 1889, he was secretly engaged to Infanta Elvira of Spain (1871–1929), his cousin and daughter of his aunt Meg, Princess Margherita of Bourbon-Parma. Elvira's older sister Princess Blanca of Bourbon had married his cousin Archduke Leopold Salvator of Austria in 1889. However, due to unknown reasons, Franz Joseph I forbade their union. After that, Leopold had a relationship with a 19-year-old girl named Leopoldina, who worked in a sweetmeat shop. According to his memoirs, Leopoldina gave birth to his illegitimate daughter who received 30.000 crowns from Leopold's father.

In 1892 and 1893, Leopold accompanied Archduke Franz Ferdinand of Austria on a sea voyage through the Suez Canal and on to India and Australia. The relationship between the two archdukes was extremely bad and their permanent attempts to outdo and humiliate the other one led the Emperor Franz Joseph to order Leopold Ferdinand to return to Austria immediately. He left the ship in Sydney and went back to Europe. He was dismissed from the Austro-Hungarian Navy and entered an infantry regiment at Brno. Eventually he was appointed colonel of the 81st Regiment FZM Baron von Waldstätten.

Leopold fell in love with a prostitute, Wilhelmine Adamovicz, whom he met for the first time in Augarten – a park in Vienna (some other sources claim their first meeting took place in Olomouc). His parents offered him 100,000 florins on condition that he leave his mistress. He refused to do so and instead decided the renounce the crown in order to be able to marry her. By order of Franz Joseph, he was placed in an insane asylum in Bendorf run by Friedrich Albrecht Erlenmeyer for three months, accompanied only by his aide-de-camp Arthur von Toeply.

== Renunciation of title ==
On 29 December 1902 it was announced that Emperor Franz Joseph I of Austria had agreed to a request by Leopold to renounce his rank as an archduke. On 3 April 1903 the Austro-Hungarian Ministry of the Imperial and Royal House and the Exterior notified him that the Emperor complied with Leopold's wish to renounce his title and to adopt instead the name Leopold Wölfling. His name was removed from the roll of the Order of the Golden Fleece and from the army list. He took the name Leopold Wölfling after a peak in the Ore Mountains. He had used this pseudonym already in the 1890s when he had travelled incognito through Germany. On the day of his departure from Austria he was notified that he was forbidden from returning to Austrian lands. He became a Swiss citizen. He was given a gift of 200,000 florins as well as a further 30,000 florins as income from his parents.

== Life as Leopold Wölfling ==
After leaving Austria, he fulfilled his earlier imperially denied wish and studied natural sciences and especially botanics at the Swiss Federal Institute of Technology Zurich, the Friedrich Wilhelm University of Berlin and the Ludwig-Maximilians-Universität München. In summer 1915 he applied as a volunteer for the Imperial German Army, but was rejected on the grounds of his Swiss citizenship.

After World War I Wölfling's allowance from his meanwhile expropriated family stopped. In 1921 he returned to Austria, desperately searching for a livelihood. Fluent in German, English, French, Italian, Hungarian, Spanish, and Portuguese; he worked for some time as a foreign language correspondence clerk. After more jobs he later opened a delicatessen store in Vienna where he sold salami and olive oil. He also tried his hand as a tourist guide in the Hofburg Palace in Vienna and was very well received by his audiences. The interest his person awoke in the Austrian capital proved to be too much for the ex-archduke and he fled the city again.

Monogram of Leopold Ferdinand of Austria

A telegram invited him to come to Berlin, Germany, to comment on the premiere of the German silent film Das Schicksal derer von Habsburg (English: The Fate of the House of Habsburg), unable to pay the fare the film company advanced him the money. So on 16 November 1928 Wölfling provided a live commentary to the film in the Primus-Palast cinema on Potsdamer Straße in Tiergarten, Berlin, afterwards touring with the film through – among others – Karlsruhe, Nuremberg, Düsseldorf, Trier, Cologne and Montreux.

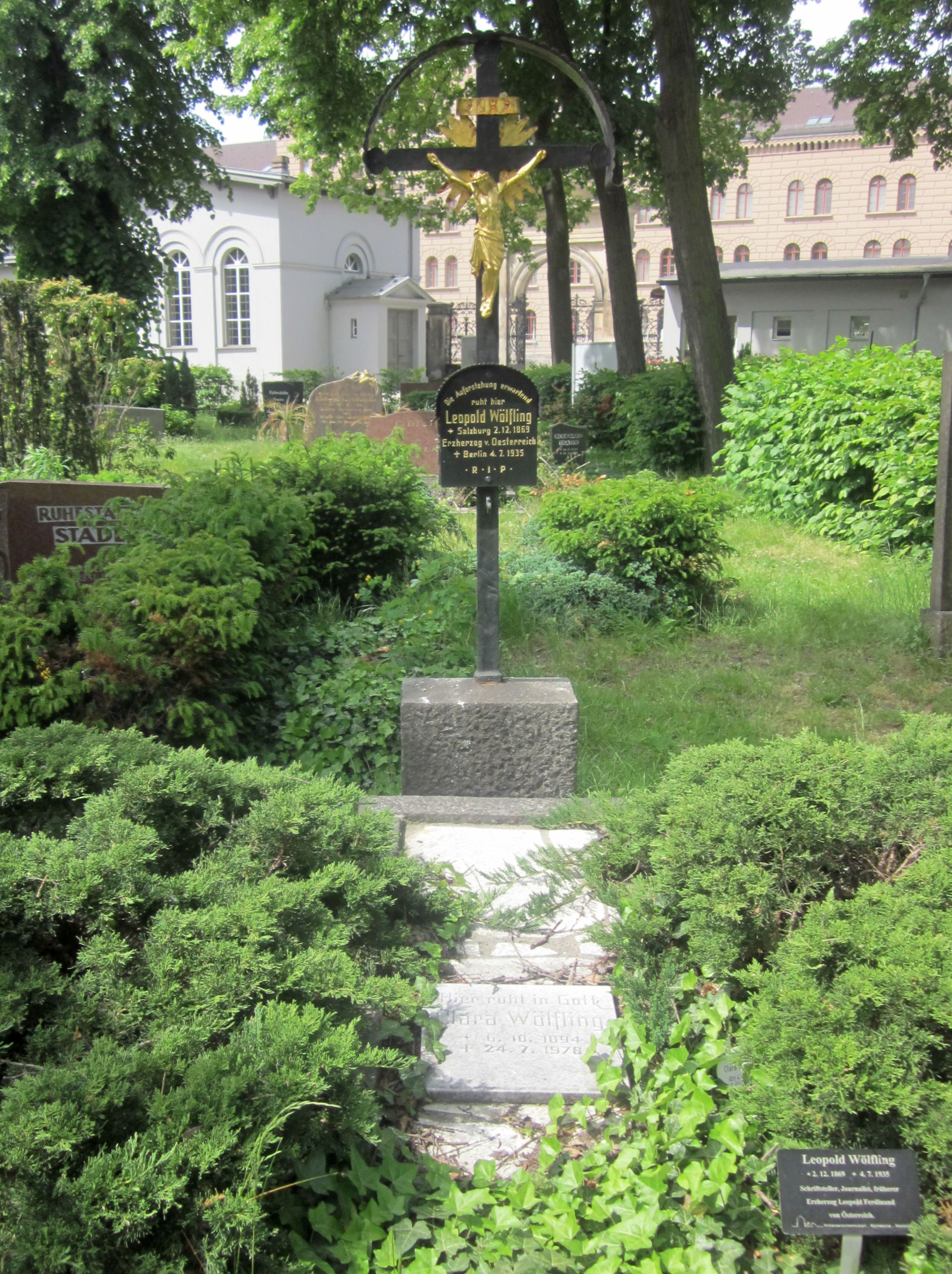
Grave of Leopold Wölfling

After that he lived in Berlin. Here he worked few menial jobs: He acted in a cabaret and wrote his memoirs. In late 1932 he wrote a series of articles on his life at the Hofburg, published in the Berliner Morgenpost. However, for his first article he chose a subject of highest topicality in then Germany. It appeared on 2 October under the headline "Es gibt keine Rassen-Reinheit. Mitteleuropa der große Schmelztiegel" (English: There is no racial purity. Central Europe the great melting pot), he confronted the spreading racism and the garbled ideas on racial purity. With such daring theses in the Nazi poisoned public atmosphere before their takeover Wölfling had reduced his opportunities to publish under their reign.

His third marriage in Niederschöneweide with the Berlin-born Klara Hedwig Pawlowski (1894–1978) was announced in the Berliner Morgenpost on 11 April 1933. His wife tried to defray their livelihood also selling his silverware to a jeweller, who, seeing the monogram, however, informed the police for suspect of theft, only to figure out that Wölfling had consented.

Wölfling died impoverished on 4 July 1935 in his third-floor flat in the rear wing of Belle-Alliance-Straße 53 (now renamed and renumbered Mehringdamm 119) in Berlin. His and his widow's graves are preserved in the Protestant Friedhof III der Jerusalems- und Neuen Kirchengemeinde (Cemetery No. III of the congregations of Jerusalem's Church and New Church) in Berlin-Kreuzberg, south of Hallesches Tor. His last book appeared posthumously.

== Marriages ==
Wölfling married three times:

- Wilhelmine Adamovicz (Lundenburg, 1 May 1877 - Geneva, 17 May 1908 / 1910) (married: 27 January / 25 July 1903 in Veyrier, divorced in 1907). Her memoirs: Wilhelmine Wölfling-Adamović, Meine Memoiren, Josef Schall (ed.), Berlin: Hermann Walther Verlagsbuchhandlung, 1908. No issue.
- Maria Magdalena Ritter (Vienna 4 Mar 1876 / 1877 - 1924) (married: 26 October 1907 in Zürich, left her in 1916 and later divorced her.). No issue.
- C/Klara Hedwig Pawlowski, née Groeger (Güldenboden (Bogaczewo), 6 October 1894 - Berlingen, 24 July 1978) (married: 3 July / 4 December 1933 in Berlin.). No issue.

== Works ==
- Habsburger unter sich: Freimütige Aufzeichnungen eines ehemaligen Erzherzogs, Berlin-Wilmensdorf: Goldschmidt-Gabrielli, 1921.
  - Czech translation: Habsburkové ve vlastním zrcadle: životní vzpomínky, Prague: Šolc a Šimáček, 1921 and Poslední Habsburkové: vzpomínky a úvahy, Prague, Fr. Borový, 1924.
  - No known English translation.
- "Es gibt keine Rassen-Reinheit. Mitteleuropa der große Schmelztiegel" (i.e. There is no racial purity. Central Europe the great melting pot), in: Berliner Morgenpost, 2 October 1932.
- "Habsburger Kaiserinnen, die ich kannte" (i.e. Habsburg empresses, whom I knew), in: Berliner Morgenpost, 9 October 1932.
- "Bei der Kaiserin Elisabeth auf Korfu" (i.e. With Empress Elizabeth on Corfu), in: Berliner Morgenpost, 10 October 1932.
- "Das Heine-Denkmal" (i.e. The Heine monument; by Louis Hasselriis now in the Jardin d'acclimatation du Mourillon, Toulon), in: Berliner Morgenpost, 11 October 1932.
- "Kaiser Franz Joseph als Ehemann" (i.e. Emperor Francis Joseph as a husband), in: Berliner Morgenpost, 12 October 1932.
- "Frühling im Prater – Tante und Neffe – Kaiserliche Schaustellung" (i.e. Spring in the Prater – aunt and nephew – imperial ostentation), in: Berliner Morgenpost, 13 October 1932.
- "Begegnung in der Nacht" (i.e. Encounter in the night; with Francis Joseph), in: Berliner Morgenpost, 8 December 1932.
- Als ich Erzherzog war. Meine Erinnerungen (i.e. When I was an archduke. My memoirs), Berlin: Selle & Eysler, 1935, reedited: Lorenz Mikoletzky (ed.), Wien: Ueberreuter, 1988, ISBN 3-8000-3272-4.
  - English translation: My Life Story: From Archduke to Grocer, London: Hutchinson, 1930. An American edition published in 1931 in New York by Dutton, reprinted in 2007 by Kessinger Publishing, ISBN 1-4325-9363-3.
  - French translation: Souvenirs de la cour de Vienne, G. Welter (trl.), Paris: Payot, 1937.
