= Georg Decker =

Austro-Hungarian portrait artist (1818–1894)

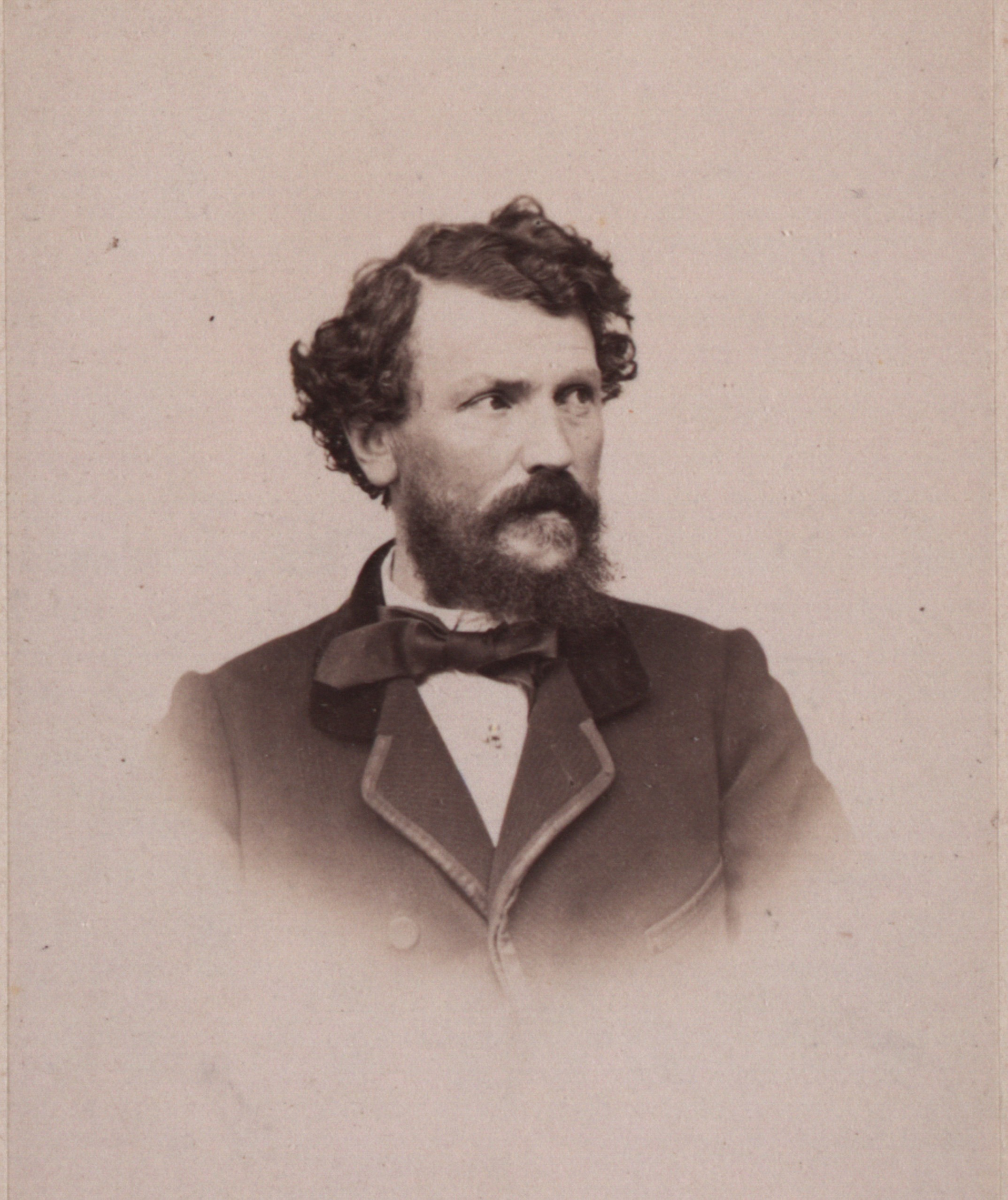
- Photograph of Decker, c. 1865
- Born: 7 December 1818; Pest, Kingdom of Hungary
- Died: 13 February 1894 (aged 75); Vienna, Austria
- Known for: Portrait art
- Awards: Knight's Cross of the Order of Franz Joseph
- Patrons: Franz Joseph I of Austria

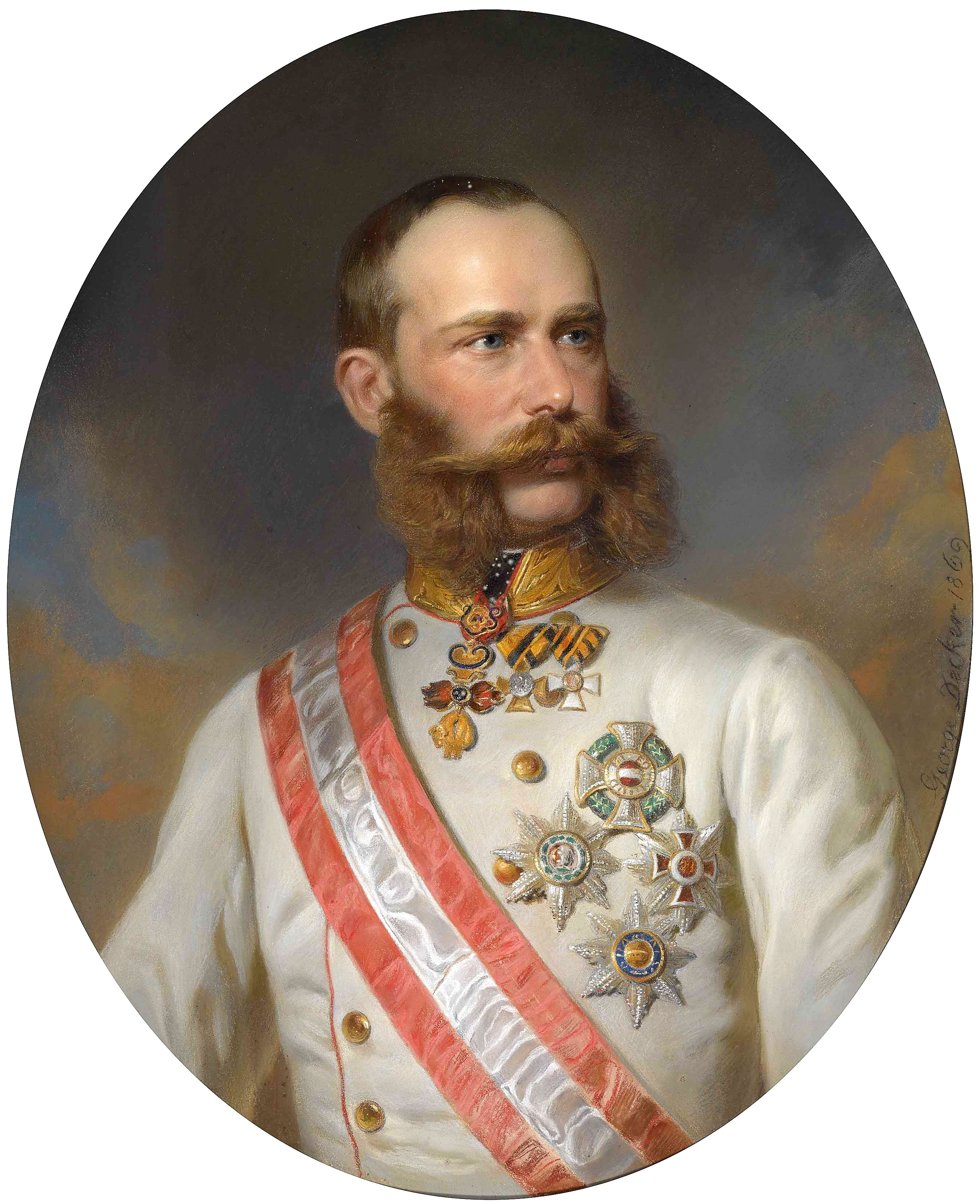
Franz Joseph I of Austria, by Decker

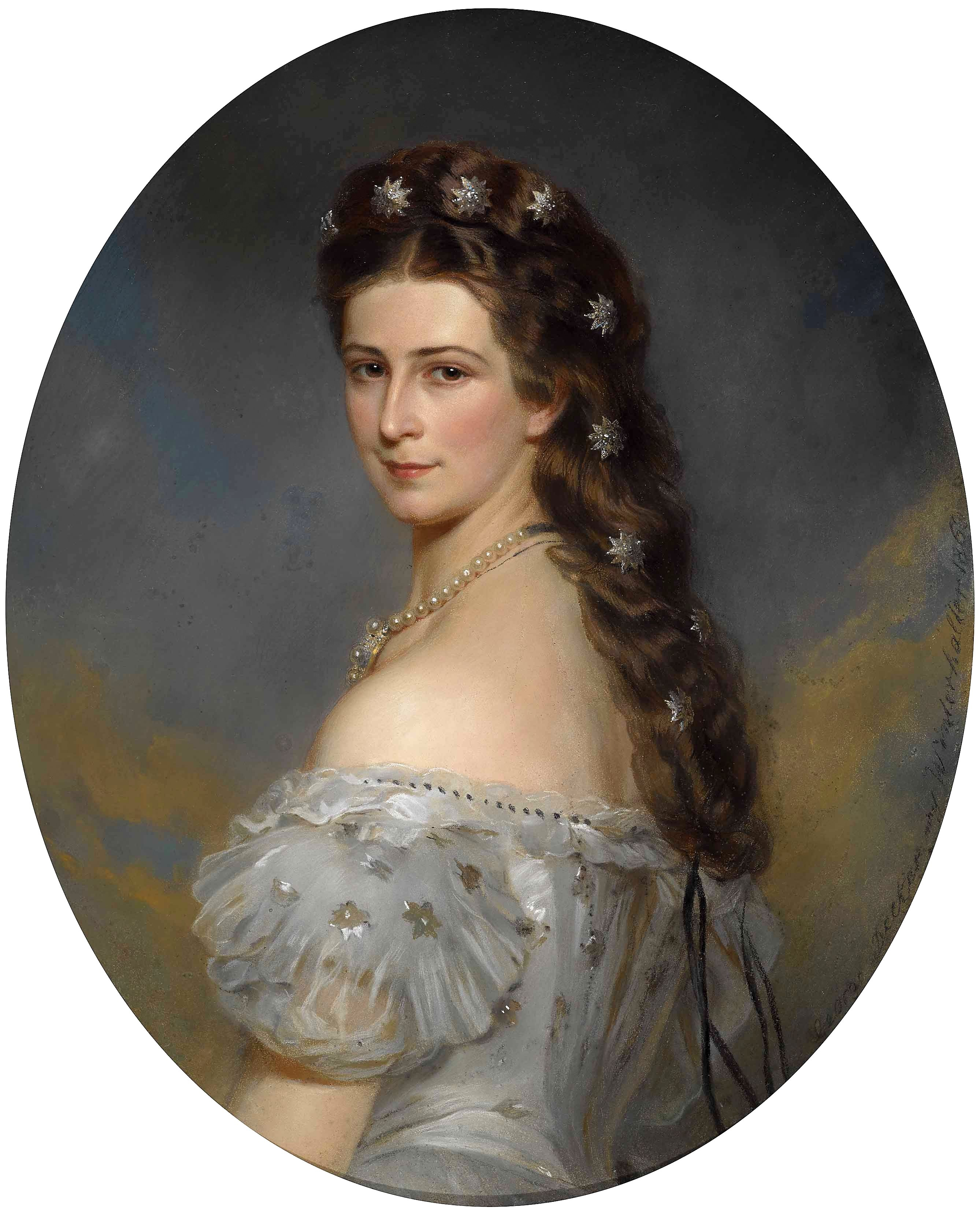
Decker's Empress Elizabeth of Austria

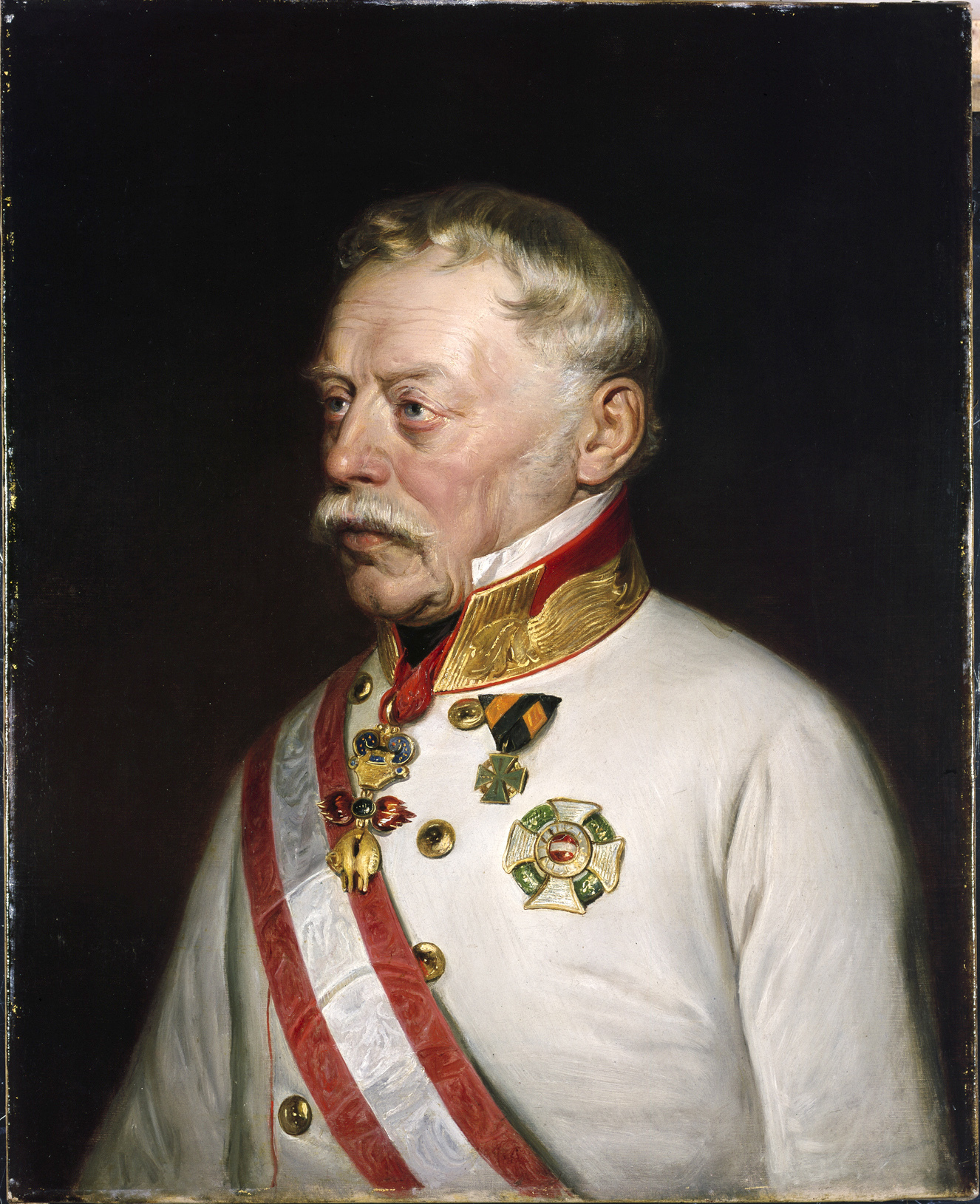
Joseph Radetzky von Radetz, portrait by Decker c. 1850

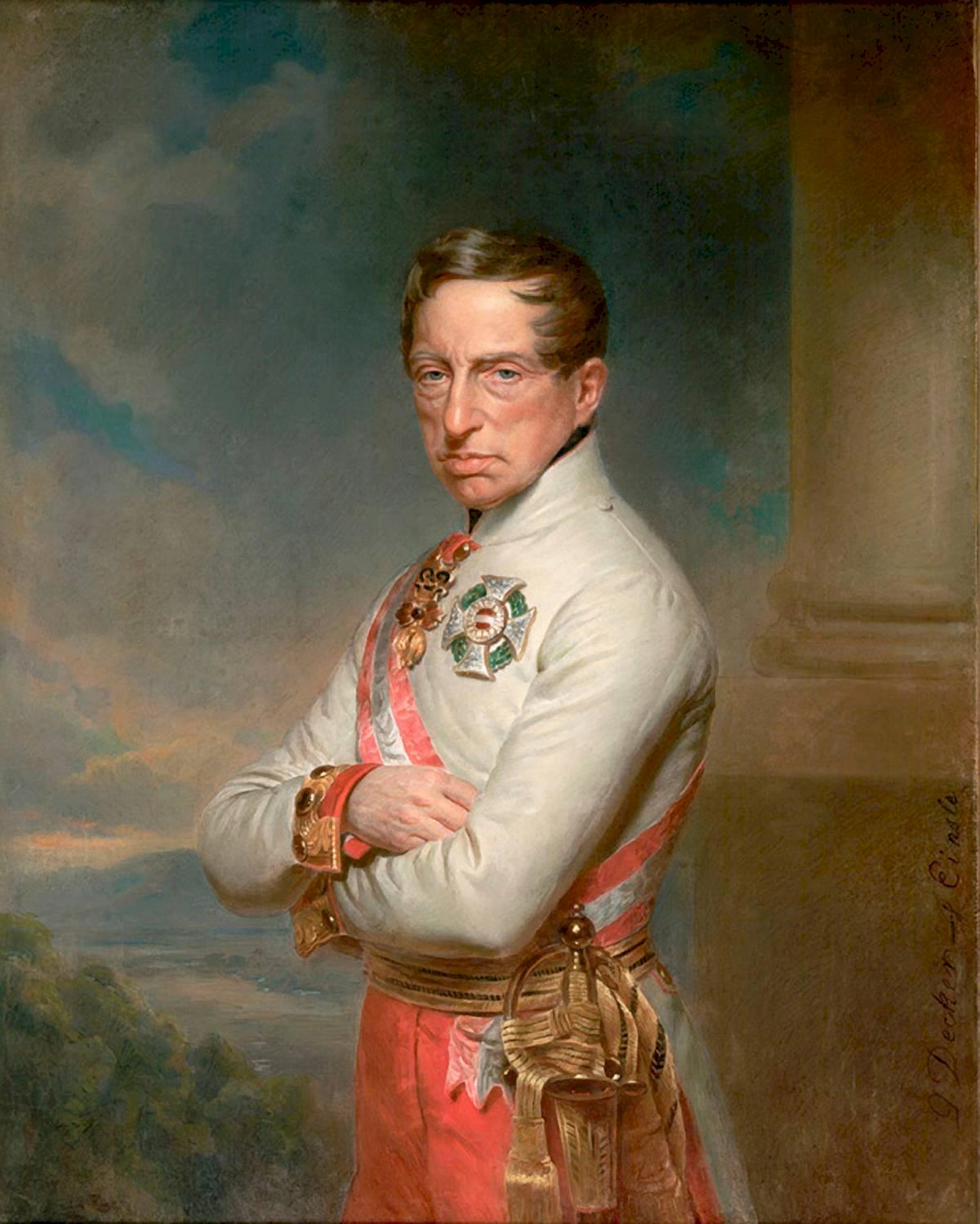
Archduke Charles, Duke of Teschen, by Decker, after Einsle

Georg Decker (7 December 1818 – 13 February 1894) was an Austro-Hungarian portrait artist.

Decker was born in Hungary to a German-speaking family, and grew up and made his career in Vienna, where he taught painting as well as working as a portrait and historical artist. Thanks to his teaching, he was sometimes referred to as Herr Professor Georg Decker.

Appointed as a knight of the Order of Franz Joseph, Decker has been called "a renowned portraitist of Vienna's highest society".

== Life ==
Decker was one of the sons of the artist Johann Stephan Decker and the brother of the artists Albert (1817–1871) and Gabriel Decker (1821–1855). He was born in Pest, in the Kingdom of Hungary, but in 1821 the Decker family moved to the imperial city of Vienna, where he grew up and was taught to draw and paint in watercolour and miniature by his father. As early as 1835, a drawing by Georg Decker of the composer Wenzel Müller was lithographed by F. Wolf. He began to exhibit watercolours in 1837 and in the early 1840s was accepted as a student at the Academy of Fine Arts, where he learnt to paint in oils. After that, Decker painted portraits in oils, and then from the 1850s also in pastels, having studied the work of Mengs and Liotard in Dresden and been captivated by the medium. Great success in this field soon followed. By 1860, Decker was conducting a private art school and in 1861 became a member of the Vienna Künstlerhaus.

Outside the world of art, Decker was an active member of the Vienna Chess Company (Wiener Schachgesellschaft) while Albert Salomon Anselm von Rothschild was its driving force.

In 1851 Decker married Ottilie von Sobek, who died in 1860. In 1861 he married secondly Josefine Helene von Lucam (1829–1914).

On his son's name day on 17 April 1869, the Emperor Franz Joseph presented the ten-year old Rudolf, Crown Prince of Austria, with a portrait of Archduke Charles, Duke of Teschen, victor of Aspern, by Decker. In 1872, the Emperor rewarded Decker's achievements in art by giving him the Knight's Cross of the Order of Franz Joseph.

When Decker died in 1894, the city of Vienna acquired a large number of sketches and portrait lithographs from his estate. He was buried in the Vienna Central Cemetery, and in 1909 a street in the Meidling district of Vienna was named Deckergasse in his honour, the mayor's year-book describing him as "the outstanding Viennese painter (hervorragenden Wiener Maler) Georg Decker" and noting that Deckergasse was near Canalettogasse. The Deckergasse crosses the Wilhelmsdorfer Park, which is also known as the Decker Park.

== Selected works ==
- Portrait of Wenzel Müller, 1835, drawing printed as lithograph
- Portrait of Admiral Wilhelm von Tegetthoff, later than 1866, pastels on card, Heeresgeschichtliches Museum, Vienna
- Portrait of Archduke Ferdinand Maximilian, c. 1857, pastels on card, Heeresgeschichtliches Museum, Vienna
- Lottery on the Brandstätte, watercolour, Vienna Museum
- Portrait of Radetzky, in pastels, c. 1850, Vienna Museum
- Portrait of Radetzky, 1850, oil on canvas, Museum of Military History, Vienna
- Portrait of Archduke Charles, Duke of Teschen, after Anton Einsle, later than 1847, oil on canvas, Albertina, Vienna
- Portrait of Joseph II, Holy Roman Emperor, pastels, Albertina, Vienna
- Portrait of Leopold von Rauch, c. 1842, lithograph, Regional Museum, Most, Czech Republic
- Portrait of Empress Elisabeth of Austria, 1869, after Winterhalter
- Portrait of Archduchess Margarethe, daughter of Ferdinand IV, Grand Duke of Tuscany, as a child, pastels on card, 1883
- Portrait of Archduke Leopold Ferdinand of Austria as a child, pastels on card

== See also ==
- Deckergasse
