= Deckergasse =

Lane in Vienna, Austria

Coordinates: 48°12′31″N 16°22′09″E

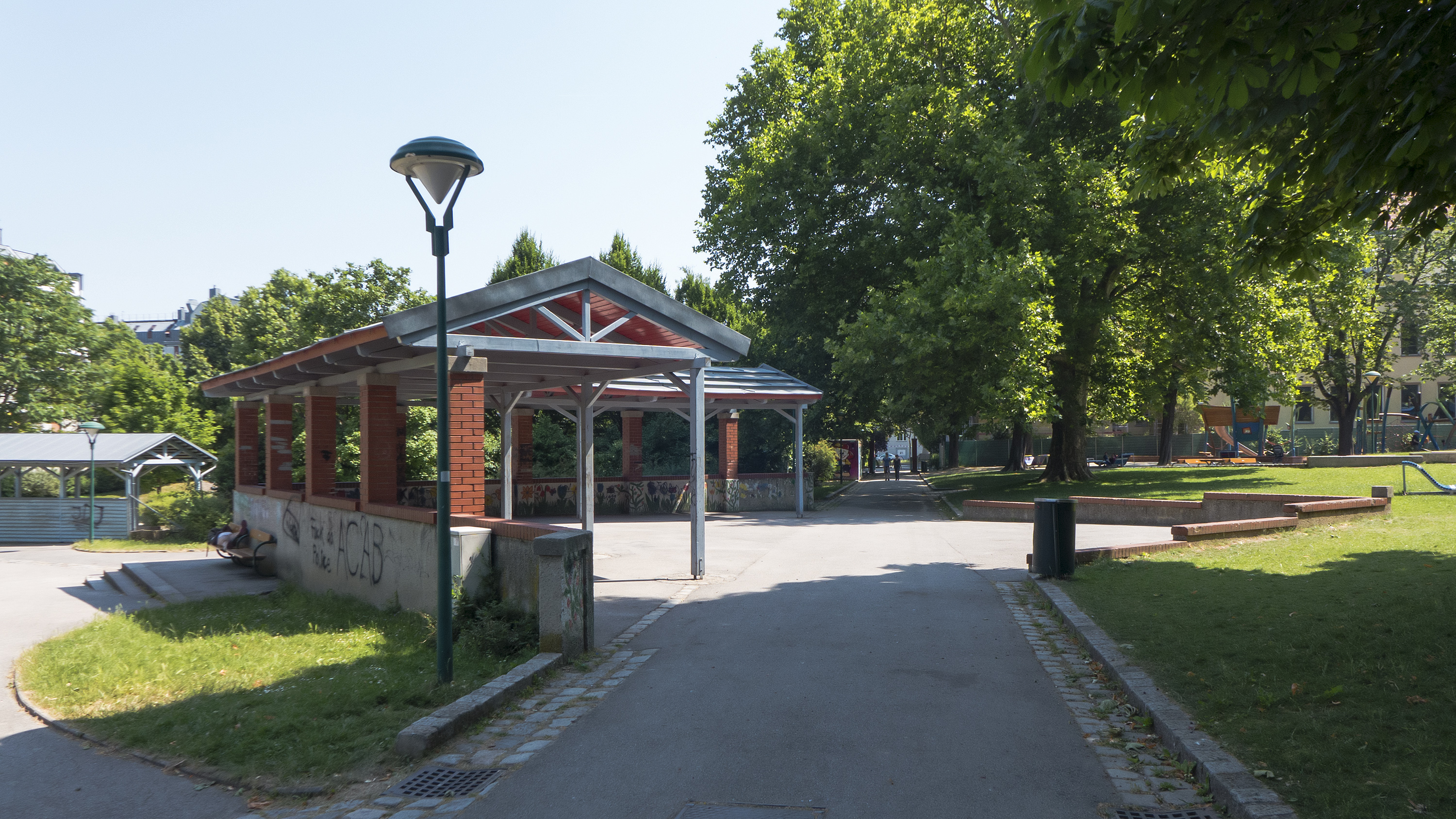
- Deckergasse through the Wilhelmsdorfer Park
- Location: Vienna

The Deckergasse is a narrow lane (German: -gasse), in the Meidling district of Vienna, Austria, stretching from the Assmayergasse in the west to the Längenfeldgasse in the east.

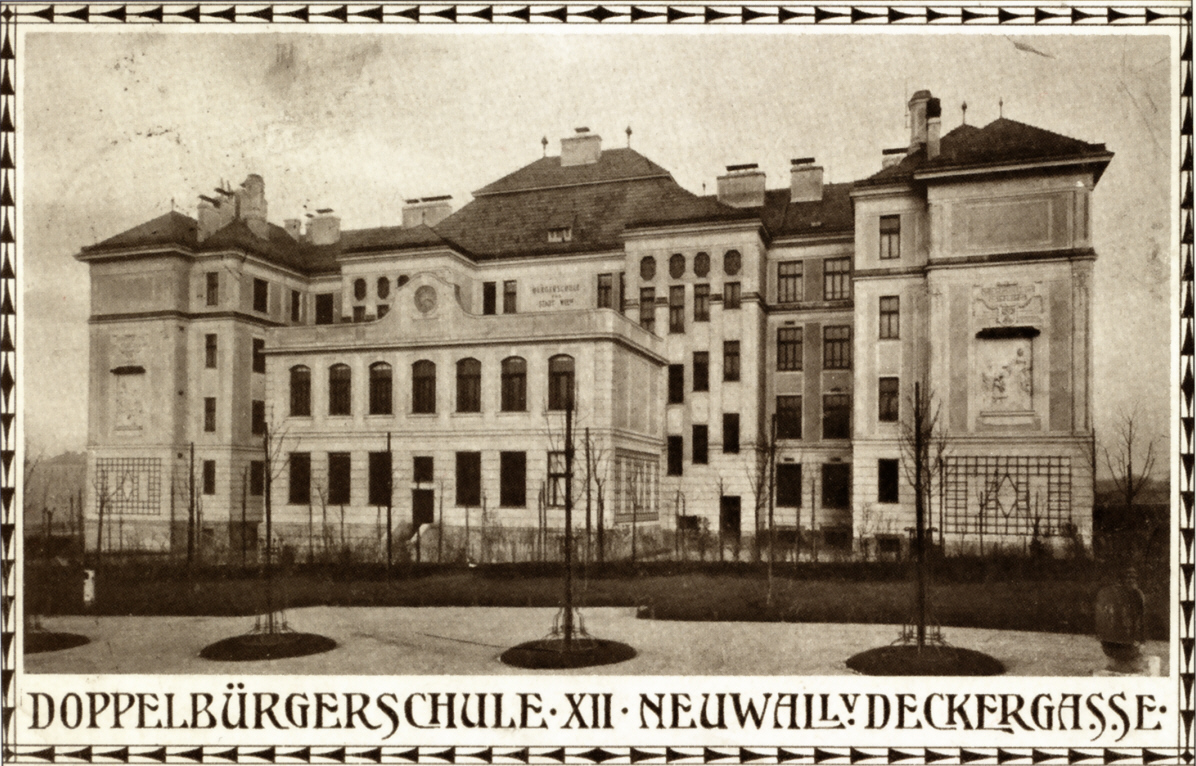
New school in the Deckergasse, 1909

It was named in 1909, when the area around it was being developed, in honour of the Viennese portrait artist Georg Decker (1818–1894). The official record published by Karl Lueger, Mayor of Vienna, described him as "the outstanding Viennese painter (hervorragenden Wiener Maler)" and noted that the Deckergasse began near the end of Canalettogasse, named after Canaletto.

As a pedestrian way (Fußweg), the Deckergasse crosses the Wilhelmsdorfer Park, popularly known as the Decker Park, which it divides, and the only significant building on it is a school, now called the Volksschule Deckergasse, or Parkschule VS Deckergasse, at number 1. When the park was redesigned in 1990, the Deckergasse was left open and was integrated into it.

The Deckergasse is in the suburb and former parish of Meidling, near the Längenfeldgasse station of the Vienna U-Bahn.
