= Ferdinand IV of Tuscany =

Grand Duke of Tuscany from 1859 to 1860

Ferdinand IV
- Ferdinand IV in 1900

Grand Duke of Tuscany
- Reign: 21 July 1859 – 22 March 1860
- Predecessor: Leopold II
- Born: 10 June 1835; Florence, Grand Duchy of Tuscany
- Died: 17 January 1908 (aged 72); Salzburg, Austria-Hungary
- Spouse: Princess Anna of Saxony (m. 1856; died 1859) Princess Alice of Bourbon-Parma (m. 1868)
- Issue Detail: Archduchess Maria Antonia; Archduke Leopold Ferdinand; Louise, Crown Princess of Saxony; Archduke Josef Ferdinand; Archduke Peter Ferdinand; Archduke Heinrich Ferdinand; Anna Maria, Princess of Hohenlohe-Bartenstein; Archduchess Margareta Maria; Archduchess Germana Maria; Archduke Robert Ferdinand; Archduchess Agnes Maria
Names
- Italian: Ferdinando Salvatore Maria Giuseppe Giovan Battista Francesco Luigi Gonzaga Raffaello Ranieri Gennaro
- House: Habsburg-Lorraine
- Father: Leopold II, Grand Duke of Tuscany
- Mother: Princess Maria Antonia of the Two Sicilies
- Religion: Roman Catholicism

Ferdinand IV, Grand Duke of Tuscany (Italian: Ferdinando IV, Granduca di Toscana; 10 June 1835 – 17 January 1908) was the last Grand Duke of Tuscany from 1859 to 1860.

== Biography ==
Born at Florence, he was the son of Leopold II, Grand Duke of Tuscany and Princess Maria Antonia of the Two Sicilies.

His first wife died in February 1859. Sometime later, he and his family were forced to flee Florence on 27 April 1859, with the outbreak of a revolution inspired by the outbreak of the Second Italian War of Independence as part of the unification of Italy. The family took refuge in Austria. After the end of the war, Leopold II abdicated on 21 July and Ferdinand succeeded him as Grand Duke. Ferdinand proved unable to return to Florence to claim his throne, and an elected Tuscan National Assembly formally deposed him only a month later, on 16 August, with Tuscany being merged into the United Provinces of Central Italy. Ferdinand still hoped to recover his throne, as both France and Austria had promised to recognize his rights to it in the Armistice of Villafranca. However, neither power was willing to take any steps to bring about his restoration; Sardinia would annex Tuscany on 22 March 1860, and with Austria recognizing the new Kingdom of Italy after the Third War of Independence in 1866, Ferdinand's hopes to reclaim the throne were ended.

Subsequently Ferdinand and his family returned to Austria. While Ferdinand was allowed to keep the grand ducal title as a courtesy and retain his status as grand master of all Tuscan orders of chivalry for his lifetime, his descendants could only bear the title of "Archduke/Archduchess of Austria"; the right to bear the title "Prince/ss of Tuscany" became restricted solely to family members born before 1866. The House of Habsburg-Tuscany continued to be recognised as a sovereign cadet branch of the House of Austria in the Almanach de Gotha and other similar genealogical publications and given precedence as such at the Austrian court. In 1870 Ferdinand relinquished all dynastic rights to the defunct grand duchy for himself and his future heirs in favour of his second cousin, Emperor Franz Joseph I, effectively ending the House of Habsburg-Tuscany's status as a sovereign cadet branch.

Ferdinand died in Salzburg in 1908, after spending the rest of his life in exile. Upon his death, his descendants were barred from using their Tuscan titles by Imperial decree. The statement that the orders were no longer conferred is correct; however, the first series of the Almanach de Gotha sometimes erroneously attributed the title of Grand Master of the Order of Saint Stephen of Tuscany and Order of Saint Joseph of Tuscany to some descendants, and put them in brackets to indicate that they were not entitled to it. Other publications published at the same time as the Almanach de Gotha, in particular the series of Gothaischen Genealogischen Hofkalenders and Gothaisches Genealogisches Taschenbuc which later became the Genealogisches Handbuch der Fürstlichen Häuser, never made this mistake and correctly omitted these unfounded claims altogether.

== Family and children ==
He married twice and had issue:

From his first marriage in Dresden on 24 November 1856 to Princess Anna of Saxony, (Dresden, 4 January 1836 – Naples, 10 February 1859), daughter of John, King of Saxony, was born:

- Archduchess Maria Antonietta, Princess of Tuscany (Florence, 10 January 1858 – Cannes, 13 April 1883). She became Princess-Abbess of the Theresian Convent in the Hradschin in Prague. Unmarried and without Issue.

From his second marriage in Frohsdorf on 11 January 1868 to Princess Alice "Alix" of Bourbon-Parma (Parma, 27 December 1849 – Schwertberg, 16 January 1935), daughter of Duke Charles III of Parma:

- Archduke Leopold Ferdinand (1868–1935). He renounced his titles on 29 December 1902 and took the name Leopold Wölfling. He married three times, without issue.
- Archduchess Louise (1870–1947). Married first King Frederick Augustus III of Saxony and after divorcing him married second Enrico Toselli and had issue by both marriages.
- Archduke Josef Ferdinand (1872–1942). He married, firstly, Rosa Kaltenbrunner and, after divorcing her married, secondly Gertrud Tomanek, by whom he had issue. Both marriages were morganatic.
- Archduke Peter Ferdinand of Austria (1874–1948). Married Princess Maria Cristina of Bourbon-Two Sicilies, and had issue.
- Archduke Heinrich Ferdinand (1878–1969). A major general in the Austrian army, morganatically married Maria Karoline Ludescher, and had issue - two sons and one daughter.
- Archduchess Anna Maria (1879–1961). She married Johannes, Prince of Hohenlohe-Bartenstein; They had three sons and three daughters. Their granddaughter married Hans Veit, Count of Toerring-Jettenbach, son of Princess Elizabeth of Greece and Denmark.
- Archduchess Margareta Maria (1881–1965)
- Archduchess Germana Maria (1884–1955)
- Archduke Robert Ferdinand (1885–1895)
- Archduchess Agnes Maria (1891–1945)

None of Grand Duke Ferdinand's younger three daughters; Margareta (1881), Germana (1884) or Agnes (1891), married. His elder daughter Louise wrote after her 1903 divorce: "I am told that ever since my divorce mamma has put all the blame on me for the fact that my sisters still remain spinsters, and maintains that my "impossible conduct" makes probably suitors wary of marrying into our family. I think it is a great pity that they do not marry, for they are sweet, amiable creatures, who, luckily for themselves, do not possess those Habsburg eccentricities which Leopold and I have inherited."

== Honours ==
Ferdinand received the following awards:

- Grand Duchy of Tuscany:
  - Grand Cross of the Order of Saint Joseph
  - Grand Master of the Order of Saint Joseph, 21 July 1859
  - Grand Master of the Order of Saint Stephen, 21 July 1859
  - Grand Master of the Order of Civil and Military Merit, 21 July 1859
- Austrian Empire:
  - Knight of the Order of the Golden Fleece, 1852
  - Grand Cross of the Royal Hungarian Order of St. Stephen, 1891
- Grand Duchy of Baden:
  - Knight of the House Order of Fidelity, 1886
  - Knight of the Order of Berthold the First, 1886
- Kingdom of Bavaria: Knight of the Order of Saint Hubert, 1856
- Belgium: Grand Cordon of the Order of Leopold (civil), 24 September 1856
- Sovereign Military Order of Malta: Bailiff Knight Grand Cross of Honour and Devotion, 19 December 1856
- Kingdom of Prussia: Knight of the Order of the Black Eagle, 26 January 1861
- Saxe-Weimar-Eisenach: Grand Cross of the Order of the White Falcon, 12 January 1864
- Kingdom of Saxony: Knight of the Order of the Rue Crown, 1856
- Württemberg: Grand Cross of the Order of the Crown, 1882

== Ancestry ==
Ancestors of Ferdinand IV of Tuscany

8. Leopold II, Holy Roman Emperor
4. Ferdinand III, Grand Duke of Tuscany
9. Infanta Maria Louise of Spain
2. Leopold II, Grand Duke of Tuscany
10. Ferdinand I of the Two Sicilies
5. Princess Luisa of Naples and Sicily
11. Archduchess Maria Carolina of Austria
1. Ferdinand IV, Grand Duke of Tuscany
12. Ferdinand I of the Two Sicilies (= 10)
6. Francis I of the Two Sicilies
13. Archduchess Maria Carolina of Austria (= 11)
3. Princess Maria Antonia of the Two Sicilies
14. Charles IV of Spain
7. Infanta Maria Isabella of Spain
15. Infanta Maria Luisa of Parma

== See also ==
- Risorgimento

== Notes ==
Ferdinand IV of Tuscany House of Habsburg-Lorraine Cadet branch of the House of Lorraine Born: 10 June 1835 Died: 17 January 1908
Regnal titles
Preceded by Leopold II	Grand Duke of Tuscany; 1859–1860	Tuscan National Assembly deposes House of Habsburg-Lorraine
Titles in pretence
Loss of title State annexed	— TITULAR — Grand Duke of Tuscany; 1860–1908	Succeeded by Archduke Josef Ferdinand, Prince of Tuscany
