= Schwertberg =

- Municipality
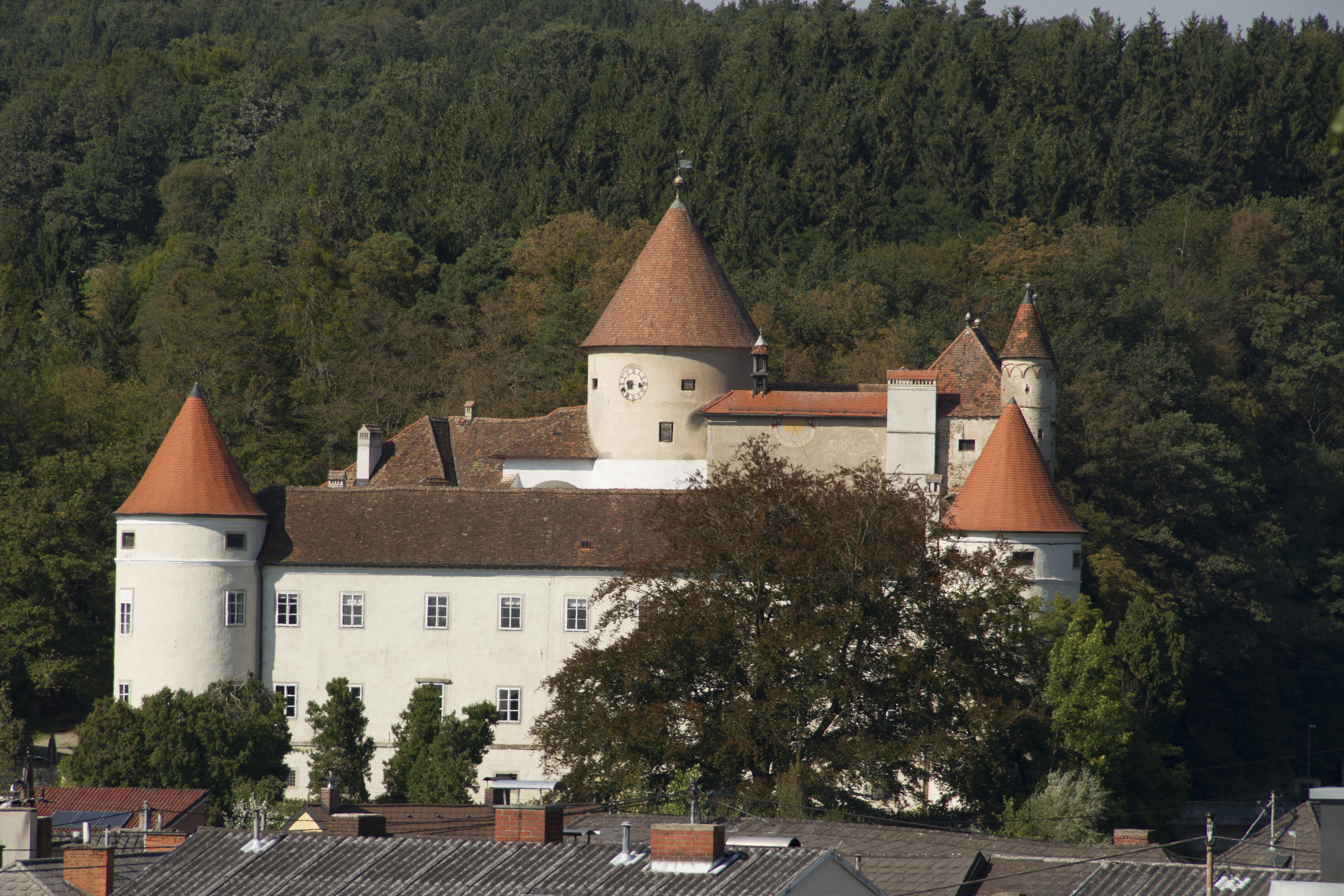
- Castle

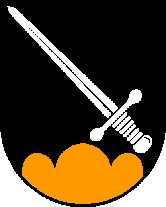
- Coat of arms

- Location within Austria
- Coordinates: 48°16′18″N 14°35′00″E
- Country: Austria
- State: Upper Austria
- District: Perg

Government
  - Mayor: Max Oberleitner (ÖVP)

Area
  - Total: 18.78 km^{2} (7.25 sq mi)
- Elevation: 268 m (879 ft)

Population (2018-01-01)
  - Total: 5,365
  - Density: 285.7/km^{2} (739.9/sq mi)
- Time zone: UTC+1 (CET)
  - Summer (DST): UTC+2 (CEST)
- Postal code: 4311
- Area code: 07262
- Vehicle registration: PE
- Website: www.schwertberg.at

Schwertberg is a market town in the district of Perg in the Austrian state of Upper Austria.

== Geography ==
Schwertberg lies in the Mühlviertel. About 32 percent of the municipality is forest, and 54 percent is farmland.

== Population ==
Historical population
Year	Pop.	±%
2005	5,284	—
2014	5,187	−1.8%
2015	5,184	−0.1%
