= Daniel von Sachsen =

German entrepreneur and politician

- Born: Daniel Timo Prinz von Sachsen; 23 June 1975 (age 51); Duisburg, North Rhine-Westphalia, West Germany
- Spouse: Sandra Scherer (m. 2011)
- Children: 2
- Parents: Rüdiger von Sachsen (father); Astrid Linke (mother)

Daniel Timo Prinz von Sachsen (born 23 June 1975), is a German politician and entrepreneur, and the eldest son of Rüdiger von Sachsen, and his wife Astrid Linke.

He is a founder of the Wettin Forest Service and the Wettiner Golf Cup.

== Early life ==
Daniel was born in Duisburg, the then-West Germany to Rüdiger von Sachsen (the second son of Prince Timo of Saxony, but first with his morganatic wife, Margrit Lucas) and his wife, Astrid Linke (1949–1989).

His paternal grandfather, Prince Timo was a son of Prince Ernst Heinrich of Saxony (a son of King Frederick Augustus III of Saxony and his former wife, Archduchess Luise, Countess of Montignoso) and his first wife, Princess Sophie of Luxembourg (the youngest daughter of Grand Duke Guillaume IV, Grand Duke of Luxembourg and his wife Maria Ana of Portugal).

He was raised in West Germany (Stein-Wingert), not returning to Dresden until well after the Berlin Wall came down. After secondary school, he joined the army, then studied business economics at RWTH Aachen University, and also trained in forestry.

== Career ==
Together with his father Rüdiger, he founded in 2003, and still runs, the Wettinische Forstverwaltung (Wettin Forest Service). He also organizes exhibitions at one of the former family palaces, Moritzburg Castle (the acclaimed baroque "hunting lodge" for ancestor Augustus II the Strong).

Since 2004, he has been a member of the municipal council of Moritzburg and the Kreis Meißen for the CDU party. In 2017, he indicated that he does not seek to become King of Poland, being a democrat. Upon the death of his father in 2022, Daniel inherited his claim to be Head of the Royal branch of the House of Wettin and Margrave of Meissen.

== Family and personal life ==
In 2001-2002, Daniel was engaged to singer Christina Linhardt. Two songs on her CD Circus Sanctuary allude to their relationship.

In 2011, Daniel married Sandra Scherer, a scientist. They have two children, Anna-Catharina Sophie (born 2013) and Gero Friedrich Johann (born 2015).

Daniel resides in Moritzburg and is a founder of the Wettiner Golf Cup.

== Ancestry ==
Ancestors of Daniel von Sachsen

16. Frederick Augustus III of Saxony
8. Prince Ernst Heinrich of Saxony
17. Archduchess Luise of Austria, Princess of Tuscany
4. Prince Timo of Saxony
18. William IV, Grand Duke of Luxembourg
9. Princess Sophie of Luxembourg
19. Infanta Marie Anne of Portugal
2. Rüdiger von Sachsen
10. Carl Lucas
5. Margrit Lucas
11. Hildegard Stube
1. Prince Daniel of Saxony
6. Heinz Linke
3. Astrid Linke
7. Elvira Wandke
