= Rüdiger von Sachsen =

German psychologist (1953–2022)

Head of the Royal House of Saxony (disputed)
- Tenure: 6 October 2012 – 29 March 2022
- Predecessor: Albert von Sachsen
- Successor: Daniel von Sachsen
- Born: Rüdiger Ernst Karl Timo Aldi Prinz von Sachsen; 23 December 1953; Mülheim an der Ruhr, North Rhine-Westphalia, West Germany
- Died: 29 March 2022 (aged 68); Moritzburg, Saxony, Germany
- Spouse: Astrid Linke (m. 1974; died 1989) Diana Dorndorf (m. 2004; div. 2008)
- Issue: Daniel von Sachsen; Arne von Sachsen; Nils von Sachsen
- Father: Prince Timo of Saxony
- Mother: Margrit Lucas

Rüdiger Ernst Karl Timo Aldi Prinz von Sachsen (23 December 1953 – 29 March 2022) was a claimant to the Headship of the Royal House of Saxony.

== Early life ==
Rüdiger Karl Ernst Timo Aldi was born in Mülheim, the only son of Prince Timo of Saxony (1923–1983) and his first wife Margrit Lucas (1932–1957), the daughter of Carl Lucas, a butcher, and his wife Hildegard Stube. Rüdiger was grandson of Prince Ernst Heinrich of Saxony and greatgrandson of the last Saxon king Frederick Augustus III of Saxony. Rüdiger's parents were married in Mülheim on 7 August 1952 in what was reported at the time as a "fairytale wedding" between a prince and a butcher's daughter. However, as Lucas was a commoner the marriage was considered morganatic, hence their children being considered as commoners with no dynastic rights unless elevated by the Head of the Royal House of Saxony.

Rüdiger had a difficult childhood. His father Prince Timo, who became addicted to morphine after sustaining serious injuries during a spring 1945 bombing raid on Dresden, had a number of failed jobs. When Rüdiger was aged just 18 months old, he was taken by his penniless mother to her father's home in Mülheim. The marriage proved difficult and Rüdiger's mother was in process of divorcing Prince Timo when she found out she was pregnant, later giving birth to a daughter, Iris von Sachsen, on 21 September 1955.

Having failed to pay child support for his wife and two children, shortly before her death in 1957 the family of Rüdiger's mother had Prince Timo placed under legal guardianship by the courts, meaning that following the death of their mother the children were placed in the care of their maternal grandparents, Rüdiger and his sister's paternal family, grandfather Prince Ernst Heinrich the youngest son of King Friedrich August III and uncles Prince Dedo of Saxony (1922–2009) and Prince Gero of Saxony (1925–2003) had emigrated to Ireland following the loss of their vast properties in Saxony which became part of communist East Germany.

The widowed Prince Timo's difficulties continued as after residing for a time in homeless shelters and dwellings to escape his creditors, the guardianship court had him admitted into a mental hospital in 1958. He was then treated by psychiatrists for the next seven years until 15 December 1965 when the ruling placing him under legal guardianship was lifted.

== Career ==
After working as a psychologist in 2003, Rüdiger left his home in Westerwald in order to move to Moritzburg, Saxony where he founded the Wettinische Forstverwaltung (Wettin Forest Management) with his eldest son Daniel von Sachsen. The forest was acquired after Rüdiger filed restitution claims for Moritzburg Castle, which had belonged to his grandfather until being expropriated in 1945. A restituion claim however was only applicable for the inventory, which has great historical value. Through a settlement with the Free State of Saxony, he was able to buy back part of the expropriated forest. The forest, which is now owned and run by the three sons of Prince Rüdiger, is approximately 1200 hectares in size.

== Saxon succession ==
The headship of the Royal House of Saxony is an area of dispute in the Saxon Royal Family. The dispute stems from the fact that the last undisputed head of the house Maria Emanuel, Margrave of Meissen, and the other princes of his generation either had no children or, in the case of Prince Timo, had children who were not recognised as being members of the Royal House of Saxony. The first designated dynastic heir of Prince Maria Emanuel was his nephew Prince Johannes of Saxe-Coburg and Gotha-Kohary, son of his youngest sister Princess Mathilde of Saxony.

After the early death of Prince Johannes, the heirless Maria Emanuel then began to look at his eldest nephew Prince Alexander Afif, the eldest son of Princess Anna of Saxony and her husband Roberto Afif, despite the Afif-Saxony marriage being against the traditional laws of the House of Saxony in the same way as the marriage of Rüdiger's parents was. In 1997 the Margrave of Meissen proposed his nephew Alexander Afif as heir and drew up a document that was signed by the other male and female members of the Royal House (including previously morganatic spouses of princes who were now treated as dynasts being attributed the style of Royal Highness; Rüdiger, his sons, and sister were not involved) setting out that Alexander Afif would succeed on his death. The document was signed by Anastasia, Margravine of Meissen; Prince Dedo (for himself, his brother Prince Gero and for their stepmother Princess Virginia); Prince Albert and his wife Princess Elmira; the Princesses Maria Josepha, Anna, and Mathilde; and Princess Erina the third wife and widow of Prince Timo. Two years later on 1 July 1999 the Margrave adopted his nephew Alexander Afif giving him the family name Prinz von Sachsen Herzog zu Sachsen.

The 1997 agreement proved to be controversial and in the summer of 2002 three of the signatories (Princes Albert, Dedo and Gero, who did not personally sign the document) retracted their support for the agreement. The following year Prince Albert wrote that it is through Prince Rüdiger and his sons that the direct line of the Albertine branch of the House of Wettin will continue, and thus avoid becoming extinct. Rüdiger himself never accepted the 1997 agreement and when asked for his opinion on who the eventual successor to Maria Emanuel should be he replied that it should be himself.

Following the death of Maria Emanuel in July 2012, Rüdiger recognised Prince Albert (who died three months later) as the new Margrave of Meissen and head of the Royal House of Saxony. The former Alexander Afif citing the 1997 agreement also assumed those positions. According to the family website prior to his death Albert determined Rüdiger to be his successor and instituted a clear succession plan. On this basis following Albert's death in October 2012 Rüdiger claimed the headship of the house.

== Personal life ==
Rüdiger was married twice. His first wife was Astrid Linke (1949–1989), the daughter of Heinz Linke and Elvira Wandke. They were married at Willich on 14 June 1974 and had three sons.

- Daniel von Sachsen, (b. 1975); married Sandra Scherer, a scientist (b. 1977) and has one daughter and one son.
- Arne Benjamin von Sachsen (b. 1977); married Sarah Schneider (b. 1979) and has two daughters.
- Nils Sebastian von Sachsen (b. 1978); married Jedida Taborek, a lawyer (b. 1975) and has one son and two daughters.

After his first wife's death, Rüdiger married for a second time in January 2004 to Diana Dorndorf. The marriage was short-lived, however, as the couple divorced in 2008. During his second marriage, Rüdiger placed a lonely hearts advertisement in the German newspaper Bild in the hope of finding a princess to marry.

== Ancestry ==
Ancestors of Rüdiger von Sachsen

16. George of Saxony
8. Frederick Augustus III of Saxony
17. Infanta Maria Anna of Portugal
4. Prince Ernst Heinrich of Saxony
18. Ferdinand IV, Grand Duke of Tuscany
9. Archduchess Luise of Austria, Princess of Tuscany
19. Princess Alice of Bourbon-Parma
2. Prince Timo of Saxony
20. Adolphe, Grand Duke of Luxembourg
10. William IV, Grand Duke of Luxembourg
21. Princess Adelheid-Marie of Anhalt-Dessau
5. Princess Sophie of Luxembourg
22. Miguel I of Portugal
11. Infanta Marie Anne of Portugal
23. Adelaide of Löwenstein-Wertheim-Rosenberg
1. Prince Rüdiger of Saxony
6. Carl Lucas
3. Margrit Lucas
7. Hildegard Stube
