= Moritzburg =

Moritzburg may refer to:

- Moritzburg, Saxony, German municipality
- Moritzburg (Halle), fortified castle in Halle, Germany
- Moritzburg Castle, Baroque palace in Moritzburg, Saxony
- Moritzburg, Palace in Zeitz, Saxony-Anhalt
- Kunstmuseum Moritzburg Halle (Saale), art museum named after the Moritzburg (Halle)
