= Prince Daniel (disambiguation) =

Prince Daniel (born 1973) is the husband of Crown Princess Victoria of Sweden.

Prince Daniel may also refer to:

- Daniel of Galicia (1201–1264), prince of Galicia 1205–1255
- Daniel of Moscow (1261–1303), Russian prince, son of Alexander Nevsky
- Prince Daniel of Saxony (born 1975)

== See also ==
- Prince Daniyal (1572–1605), Prince of Mughal Empire and son of Emperor Akbar the Great
- Daniyal, son of Alauddin Husain Shah (r. 1494–1519), Sultan of Bengal
