= Georg, Crown Prince of Saxony =

Crown Prince of Saxony (1893–1943)

Georg
- Crown Prince of Saxony
- Crown Prince George of Saxony in 1911
- Born: 15 January 1893; Dresden, Kingdom of Saxony, German Empire
- Died: 14 May 1943 (aged 50); Groß Glienicke Lake, Berlin, Nazi Germany
- Burial: Katholische Hofkirche, Dresden
Names
- German: Friedrich August Georg Ferdinand Albert Karl Anton Paul Marcellus; English: Frederick Augustus George Ferdinand Albert Charles Anthony Paul Marcellus
- House: Wettin (Albertine line)
- Father: Frederick Augustus III of Saxony
- Mother: Archduchess Louise of Austria
- Religion: Roman Catholicism

Georg, Crown Prince of Saxony or George (15 January 1893 – 14 May 1943) was the last Crown Prince of Saxony and the heir to Frederick Augustus III, the final King of Saxony, at the time of the monarchy’s abolition on 13 November 1918.

He later became a Roman Catholic priest and a Jesuit. He drowned while swimming in the Groß Glienicke Lake in Berlin. The last entry in his diary was a quotation from the Gospel of John interpreted as "I go to the Father" or "I go to my Father." His brother Ernst Heinrich suspected that Georg committed suicide, but the official autopsy rejected this theory.

== Early life and education ==
Georg was born on 15 January 1893 in Dresden, capital of Kingdom of Saxony. He was the son of Prince Frederick Augustus, the later King Frederick Augustus III and his wife, Luise, née Archduchess Luise of Austria, Princess of Tuscany. His siblings were the Princes Friedrich Christian and Ernst Heinrich and the Princesses Margarete, Maria Alix and Anna Monika

After his parents lived separately in 1903, his father took sole parental responsibility for the children. He emphasised the Christian faith and a Catholic lifestyle. The children were educated by private tutors in a prince's school established by their father at the Saxon court. Most of the teachers were Protestants; this contributed to his later ecumenical attitude. Georg became Saxony's crown prince at age eleven, when his father acceded to the throne in 1904.

After graduating from high school in 1912, Georg studied political sciences for three months at the University of Breslau. He then began to study economics. During this time, he joined the KDSt.V. Winfridia.

== First World War ==
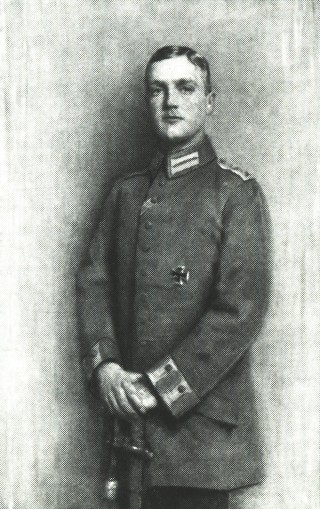
Crown Prince Georg in 1916, by Robert Sterl

After completing his studies in 1912, Georg joined the 1st Royal Saxon Leib-Grenadier Regiment No. 100. His friend and fellow officer Ludwig Renn also served in that regiment; at the time, Ludwig still used his birth name Arnold Friedrich Vieth von Golßenau.

Georg held the rank of Captain when he was sent to the front at the start of World War I. He suffered a serious leg injury during the first months of the war. In 1915, Kaiser Wilhelm II granted him the Iron Cross first class "in recognition of the services he rendered in the recent battles.".

On 27 July 1916, he was added to the staff of Army Group Gallwitz. On 30 August 1916, he received the Military Order of St. Henry for his services in this staff.

On 30 November 1917, he was promoted to major and made commander of the 5th Royal Saxon Infantry Regiment "Crown Prince" No. 104. He commanded this regiment on both the Eastern and the Western Front. He held this command until 22 May 1918.

== Engaged to be married ==
In the spring of 1918, newspapers announced the prince's engagement to Duchess Marie Amelia, daughter of Albrecht, Duke of Württemberg, the heir to the throne of the Kingdom of Württemberg. The end of the Saxon monarchy and the prince's desire to become a priest apparently led to the end of the engagement. The duchess died unmarried in 1923.

== Abolition of monarchy and Jesuit priest ==
The Crown Prince's standard. Georg was Saxony's last crown prince

When Germany lost the war, the monarchies in Germany collapsed. Georg's father abdicated on 13 November 1918. This marked a fundamental turning point in his career planning. In 1919, he decided to renounce his rights on the Saxon throne, and become a Catholic priest instead. This decision was very controversial among people who hoped that the monarchy might one day be restored, and also met with significant concerns from the side of the Catholic Church. For example, Franz Löbman, the Apostolic Vicar for Saxony and Lusatia, and Archbishop Adolf Bertram of Breslau initially held that Georg should continue to hold political responsibility for Saxony. Nevertheless, Georg entered the Franciscan Order.

Finding the Franciscan life too intellectually limiting, Georg soon applied to transfer to the Jesuits instead. In the winter semester 1919/20, he studied philosophy at the University of Tübingen. During this period, he joined the A.V. Guestfalia Tübingen. In the next semester, he studied at the University of Breslau.

In the winter semester 1920/21, he began studying theology at the University of Freiburg. He joined the KDSt.V. Hohenstaufen and Saxo-Thuringia. He completed this study in 1923. In the same year, he formally renounced his rights to the Saxon throne and became a Jesuit.

He was ordained a priest in Trzebnica on 15 July 1924 by Bishop Christian Schreiber of Meissen. The next day, he celebrated his first mass at his family's royal palace of Sibyllenort (now in Szczodre, Poland). His uncle Maximilian, also a priest, gave the homily during this service. Thereafter, the young prince was generally known as Pater Georg (Father George) and used the last name von Sachsen. After his ordination, George worked as an auxiliary priest in his native Diocese of Meissen.

He then continued his studies at the Jesuit Collegium Canisianum in Innsbruck. In the fall of 1925, he joined the Upper German province of the Society of Jesus, however, in 1927, he switched to the East German province, which included his native Saxony. From 1928 to 1930, he studied at a Jesuit college in Valkenburg.

From 1933, he did pastoral work in Berlin. He helped build up the Jesuit residence Canisius College with the Catholic Gymnasium at Lietzensee. After taking his final vows in Berlin in 1936, he gave lectures and the spiritual exercises all over Germany. In his lectures, he promoted ecumenism and in particular the Una Sancta movement. Among his friends were spiritual leaders of different religions.

== Opponent of Nazism ==
Georg opposed Nazism from the beginning. During one of his many lectures, he said in Meissen in 1929, referring to the increasing antisemitic agitation by some right-wing parties: "Love is the order of the day in the relationship between Catholics and Protestant, and also to our Jewish fellow citizens". He found it unbearable that the Nazi Party and after 1933 the state vilified and sought to destroy core values that were important to him personally — monarchical and dynastic Saxon traditions and fundamental values of Western Christianity. He felt that his family honor was offended and his work as a pastor was significantly impeded.

He worked in Berlin where he was credited with protecting Jews from the Nazi regime in notable contrast to his pro-Nazi brothers-in-law, Prince Frederich of Hohenzollern and Prince Franz Joseph of Hohenzollern-Emden.

As critic of the regime and a member of the former Saxon royal family, but in particular as a Catholic priest and a member of the Jesuit order, he was seen as highly suspect by the Nazi regime. He was shadowed by the Gestapo because he helped Jews leaving the country and he helped opposition politicians hiding from the regime. Sometimes, he had to go into hiding himself, and the police searched his home several times. He knew some of the people who later attempted the failed 20 July plot, in particular Ulrich von Hassell and General Paul von Hase. It is not clear whether he actually participated in the resistance.

== Death ==
Georg died on 14 May 1943, apparently while swimming in the Groß Glienicke Lake in Berlin, Germany.

His diary was found on the lakeshore with a final Latin entry, Vado ad patrem, a phrase frequently used by Jesus in the Gospel of John, meaning "I go to the Father" or "I go to my Father." His body was recovered several weeks later. Some, including his brother Ernst Heinrich, expressed doubts that his death had been accidental. However, the autopsy concluded that he had died after suffering a heart attack.

He was buried on 16 June 1943 in the Catholic Church of the Royal Court of Saxony, today the Cathedral of the Holy Trinity, in Dresden. His grave was later damaged during the Allied bombing of Dresden in 1945, and again during the floods of August 2002.

== Honours ==
- Kingdom of Saxony:
  - Knight of the Rue Crown, 1905
  - Knight of the Military Order of St. Henry, 1916
  - Commander of the Albert Order, 1st Class
- Baden:
  - Knight of the House Order of Fidelity
  - Grand Cross of the Order of Berthold the First
- Kingdom of Bavaria: Knight of St. Hubert, 1913
- (Saxe-Coburg and Gotha) (Duchy of Saxe-Altenburg) (Saxe-Meiningen) Ernestine duchies: Grand Cross of the Saxe-Ernestine House Order
- Kingdom of Prussia:
  - Knight of the Black Eagle
  - Iron Cross (1914), 2nd and 1st Classes
- Hohenzollern: Cross of Honour of the Princely House Order of Hohenzollern, 1st Class
- Mecklenburg: Grand Cross of the Wendish Crown, with Crown in Ore
- Oldenburg: Grand Cross of the Order of Duke Peter Friedrich Ludwig, with Collar
- Principality of Reuss-Gera: Cross of Honour, 1st Class
- Saxe-Weimar-Eisenach: Grand Cross of the White Falcon
- Württemberg: Grand Cross of the Württemberg Crown, 1906
- (Austrian Empire) (Kingdom of Hungary) Austria-Hungary:
  - Knight of the Golden Fleece, 1914
  - Grand Cross of the Royal Hungarian Order of St. Stephen, 1917
- Kingdom of Bulgaria: Knight of the Order of Saints Cyril and Methodius
- Kingdom of Greece: Grand Cross of the Redeemer

== Works ==
Prinz Georg, 15. Januar 1893–1943, type-written memoirs (in German)
