= Enrico Toselli =

Italian composer

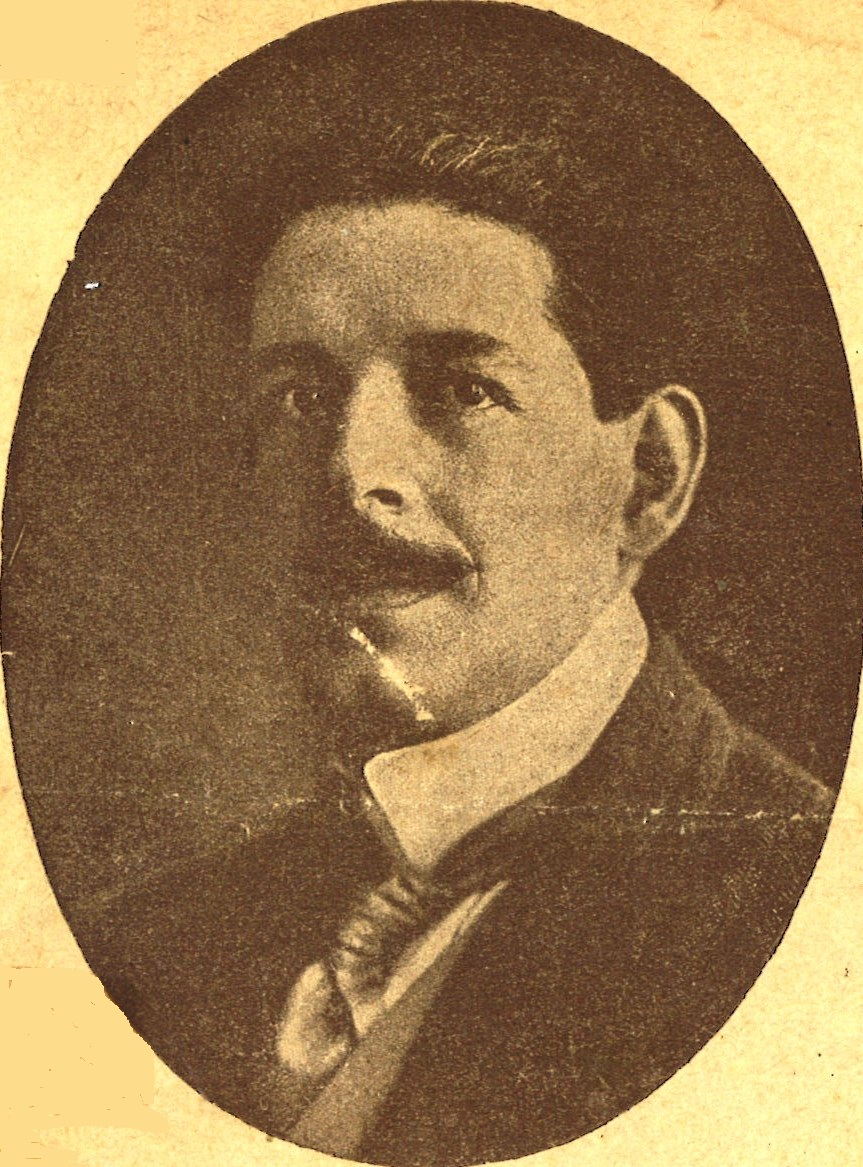

Enrico Toselli, Count of Montignoso (March 13, 1883 – January 15, 1926), was an Italian pianist and composer. Born in Florence, he studied piano with Giovanni Sgambati and composition with Giuseppe Martucci and Reginaldo Grazzini. He embarked on a career as a concert pianist, playing in Italy, European capital cities, Alexandria and North America.

His most popular composition is Serenata 'Rimpianto' Op.6 No.1. His other works include two operettas, La cattiva Francesca (1912) and La principessa bizzarra (1913).

Toselli's fame largely derives not from his musical ability but from his scandalous elopement with Archduchess Louise of Austria, the former Crown Princess of Saxony, in 1907. She had previously deserted her husband, Frederick Augustus of Saxony, and they had divorced in 1903. Her ex-husband became king of Saxony in 1904. Toselli's marriage ended in divorce in 1912. They had one son, Carlo Emanuele (7 May 1908 – 1969).

Toselli's memoirs of his marriage to royalty, Mari d’altesse: 4 ans de mariage avec Louise de Toscane, ex-princesse de Saxe, were published in French after his divorce. He died of consumption in 1926 at the relatively young age of 43.
