= Hermione von Preuschen =

German-born Italian painter (1854–1918)

- Born: 7 August 1854; Darmstadt, Germany
- Died: 12 December 1918 (aged 64); Lichtenrade, Germany
- Known for: Painting, Writing

Hermione von Preuschen, Ma serre Nice.

Hermione von Preuschen (1854–1918) was a German painter and author. She is also referred to by the names Erminia Preuschen, Hermine von Preuschen, and Hermine Preuschen. She worked for many years in Italy, but also traveled long and extensively.

== Biography ==
Preuschen was born on 7 August 1854 in Darmstadt. From 1869 to 1871 she studied painting at the Academy of Fine Arts, Karlsruhe with Hans Gude and Ferdinand Keller. She was a resident of Rome for number of years, painting still lives of fruits and flowers. In 1883 at Rome, she exhibited a Risposta, depicting thistles; In autunno, depicting fruit; and Dimanda, a study of carnations. In 1884 at Turin, she exhibited Evoè, Barche!

In 1887 her picture Mors Imperator was rejected by the Berliner Kunstausstellung (Berlin Art Exhibition). She subsequently exhibited the picture herself, having rented out a restaurant for that purpose. The picture caused controversy because it was thought to be an allusion to Kaiser Wilhelm I, who was very old at that time.

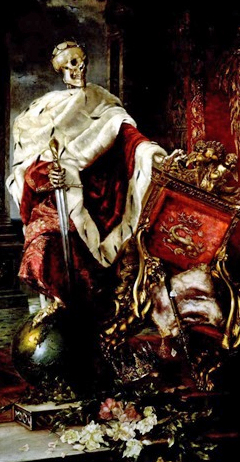
Mors imperator by Hermione von Preuschen, 1887

She exhibited her work at the Woman's Building at the 1893 World's Columbian Exposition in Chicago, Illinois.

Preuschen books include Via passionis: Lebenslieder, Yoshiwara, vom Freudenhaus des Lebens and Durch Glut und Geheimnis.

Preuschen was married twice. In 1882 she married a doctor, Oswald Schmidt, whom she subsequently divorced. Her second marriage in 1891 was to the writer Konrad Telmann who died in 1897. They had two daughters, Ingeborg and Helga Telmann.

Preuschen died on 12 December 1918 in Lichtenrade.
