= Archduchess Louise of Austria =

Crown Princess of Saxony (1870–1947)

Luise of Austria
- Crown Princess of Saxony; Countess of Montignoso
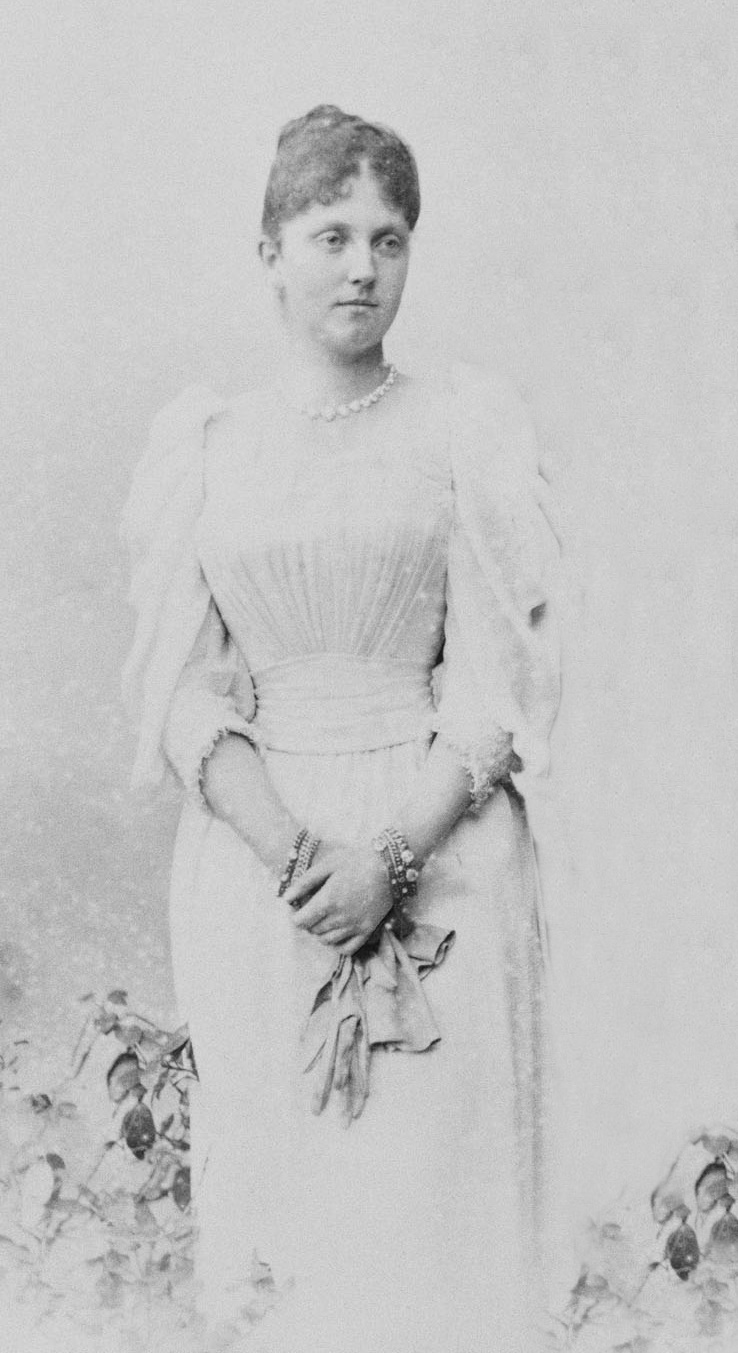
- Louise in 1891
- Born: 2 September 1870; Salzburg, Austria-Hungary
- Died: 23 March 1947 (aged 76); Brussels, Belgium
- Spouse: Frederick, Crown Prince of Saxony (m. 1891; div. 1903) Enrico Toselli (m. 1907; div. 1912)
- Issue: Georg, Crown Prince of Saxony; Friedrich Christian, Margrave of Meissen; Prince Ernst Heinrich; Princess Maria Alix Karola; Margarete Karola, Princess of Hohenzollern; Maria Alix Luitpolda, Princess of Hohenzollern-Emden; Anna Monika Pia, Archduchess of Austria; Carlo Emmanuele Toselli
Names
- Luise Antoinette Maria Theresia Josepha Johanna Leopoldine Caroline Ferdinande Alice Ernestine
- House: Habsburg-Lorraine
- Father: Ferdinand IV, Grand Duke of Tuscany
- Mother: Alice of Bourbon-Parma
- Coat of arms Louise,Crown Princess of Saxony

Archduchess Louise of Austria (2 September 1870 – 23 March 1947) was the eldest daughter of Ferdinand IV, Grand Duke of Tuscany, and his second wife, Princess Alice of Bourbon-Parma. She became crown princess of Saxony by her first marriage to the future Frederick Augustus III.

Louise was born in Salzburg to the exiled Grand Duke of Tuscany and received a relatively informal upbringing. Aged 17, she began to attract suitors and the crown prince of Saxony (later Frederick Augustus III) was eventually settled on.

Upon arriving in Dresden, Louise rejected the strict rules of Saxon court life, which brought her into conflicts with her in-laws. Louise gave birth to six children, increasing her popularity among the Saxon people. Her unhappiness with her marriage moved her to have numerous affairs, and she was threatened by her father in law with internment at an asylum. Whilst pregnant with her seventh child, Louise fled to Lake Geneva, where her brother Leopold awaited her. The following scandal was severely damaging to the Saxon royal family.

Her marriage was civilly dissolved in 1903, and a year later, she was barred from returning to Saxony. Louise first lived with a lover, giving birth to a daughter who was officially the daughter of Frederick, until late 1903 when they separated. In 1907, Louise married again, this time to a different lover, but this union only produced one child and they divorced in 1912. Following this, she relied on the charity of her wealthy Habsburg family, but when Austria-Hungary collapsed in 1918, Louise lost this income and largely fell into poverty and died as a flower seller in 1947.

== Life ==
=== Early years ===
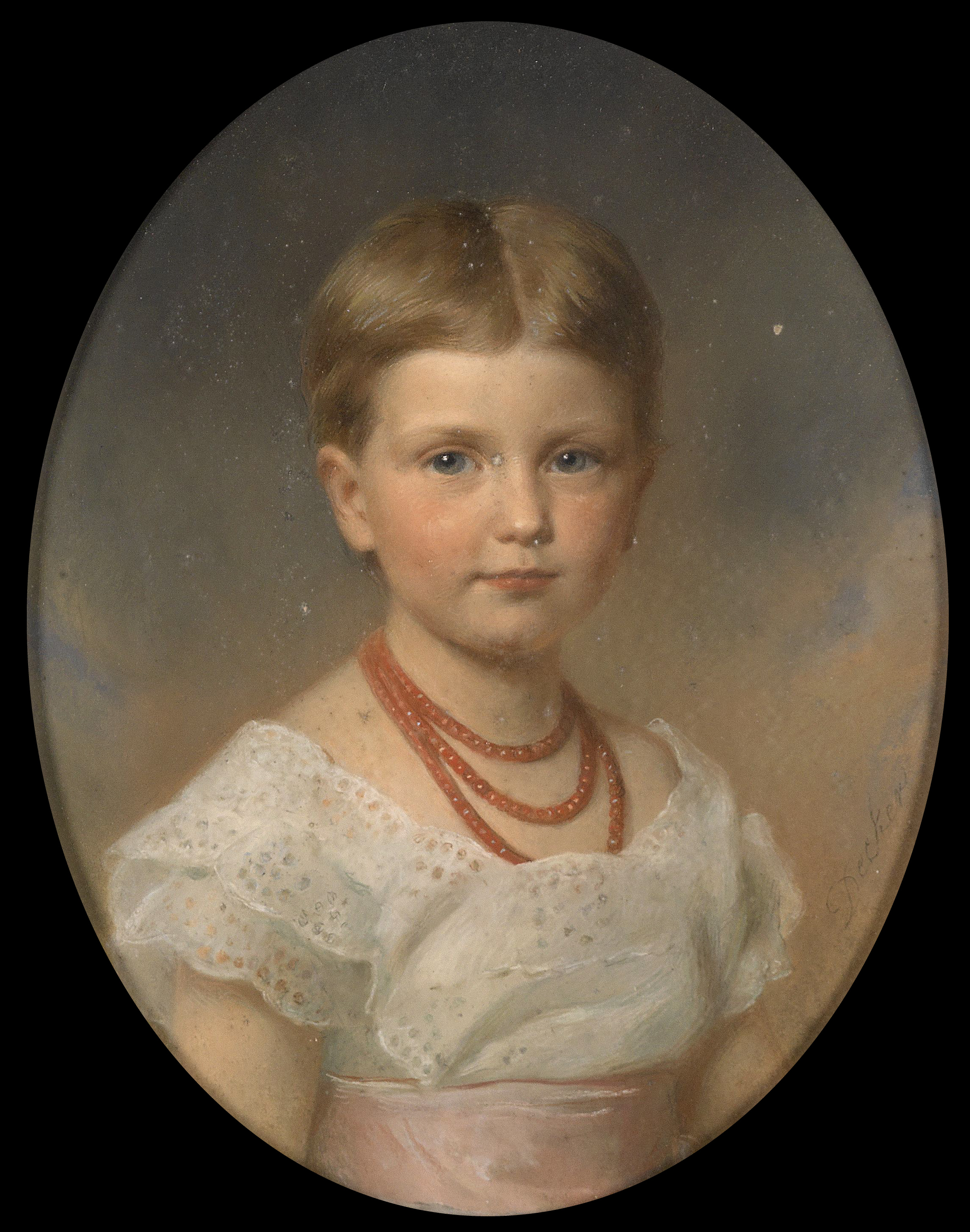
Louise as a girl in 1875 (pastel by Georg Decker)

Louise was born on 2 September 1870, the second child of Ferdinand IV, the former Grand Duke of Tuscany and his second wife, Princess Alice of Bourbon-Parma. While close to her older brother, Leopold, the siblings never had a loving relationship with their parents, who were distant, pious and often absent. Leopold later wrote:

The truth about Mother was that she should have been a nun. Fate sadly miscast her as the wife of a big, virile husband and the mother of many small turbulent children. [...] A product of her environment, she could not be blamed for being what she was – a fanatical bigot.

In 1886, Louise expressed her atheism and independence by declaring that she would choose her own husband, and that she would no longer attend Mass. In one incident, Louise was locked in a room with a priest on the order of her mother with the intention that he would bring her to repentance. The priest, however, sexually assaulted Louise, and her brother Leopold broke down the door, attacked the priest, and threw him out. In his memoirs, Leopold hinted that the same priest had abused him. At the age of 17, Louise attracted the attention of potential suitors, among them Prince Pedro Augusto of Saxe-Coburg and Gotha (grandson of Emperor Pedro II of Brazil) and Prince Ferdinand of Bulgaria, but none appealed to her. Louise wrote to the latter:

Let me assure you at once that I do not and could not love you, and should not be happy as your wife. I quite realise your worldly advantages, but you would never be able to give me real happiness. I'm sure you only want to marry me because I am an Austrian Archduchess; the word Archduchess stands for love in your vocabulary, and you have promised your ministers to return to Bulgaria betrothed to me. Well I shall not marry you. You'd better go to the Duke of Parma and ask him for my cousin, Marie-Louise.

According to the account of her brother Leopold, the engagement was actually cancelled because Ferdinand had spent an inappropriate amount of time alone with a woman on his way to Salzburg.

=== Crown Princess of Saxony ===
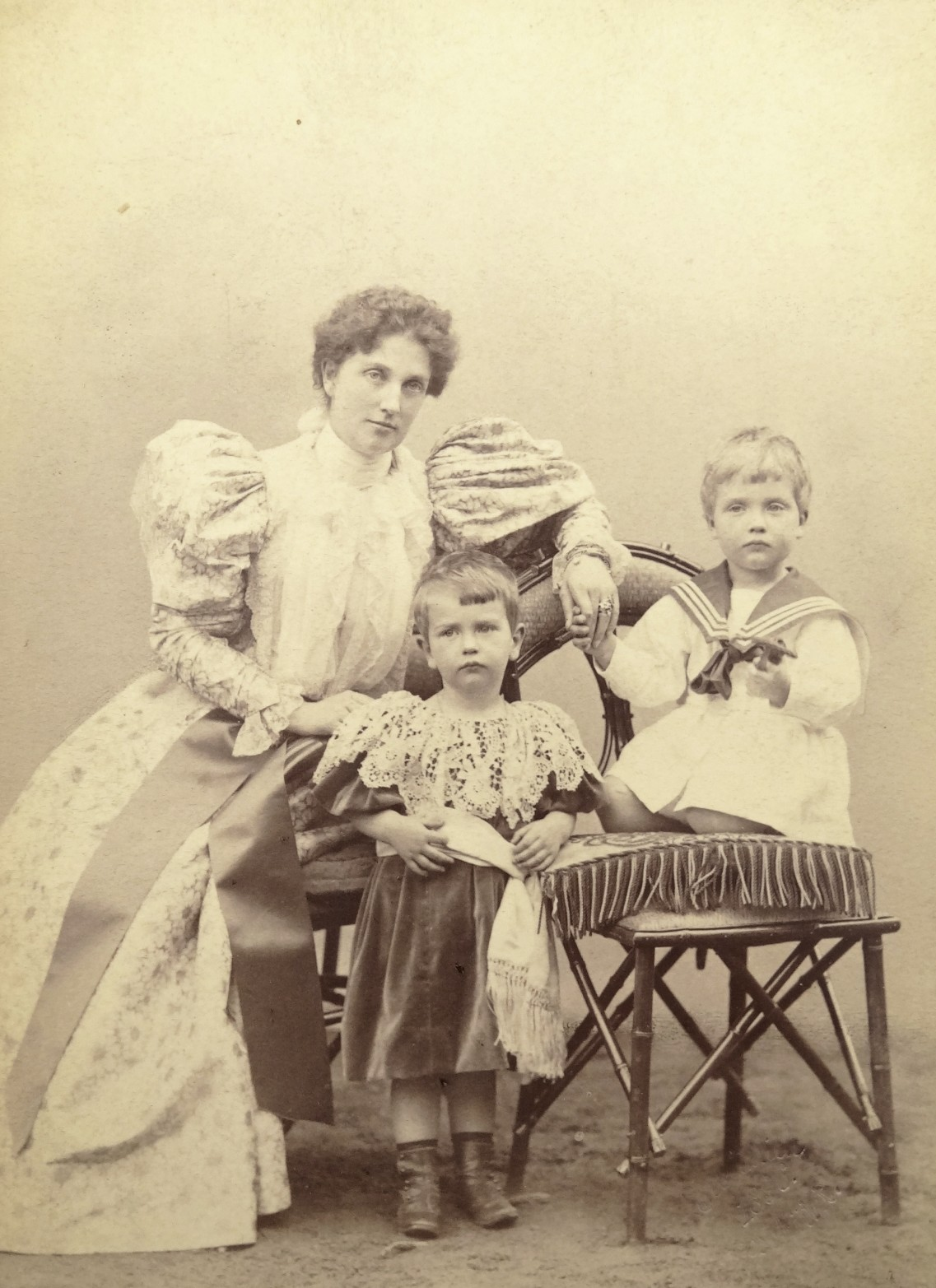
Crown Princess Louise with her sons (Georg and Friedrich Christian), 1890s

In the summer of 1887, at Pillnitz Castle, Louise met Prince Frederick Augustus of Saxony (eldest son of Prince George, who became king of Saxony in 1902). They married at Vienna on 21 November 1891, in a lavish ceremony which cost the groom the sum of 20,000 marks. In return, Louise fulfilled her royal duties, and bore him six children; however, she did not follow etiquette at the strict Dresden court, which resulted in arguments with her father-in-law, the Interior Minister Georg von Metzsch-Reichenbach, and her sister-in-law Princess Mathilde.

As her popularity among the people by far exceeded that of the rest of the Saxon Royal Family, her life became difficult in the form of intrigue. Rumors began to circulate that Louise had had an affair with a dentist named O'Brian and with her children's French tutor, André Giron. In desperation, she sent a telegram to Giron, which was intercepted by the secret police and it turned out that she had actually begun an affair with him. This was discussed by her biographer Erika Bestenreiner, who described the French tutor as a slender black-haired man with a small dark mustache, of a lively nature, with perfect manners and good taste in clothes.

=== Scandal ===
Threatened by her father-in-law with being interned in a mental asylum at the Sonnenstein Castle for life, in December 1902, with the help of two of her maids, Louise, who was pregnant with her seventh child fled from Dresden towards Lake Geneva, where Giron was waiting for her. At first it was believed by the Saxon court that the trip was for recreation, but Louise arranged to meet her brother Leopold, who had begun a liaison with (and shortly after married) Wilhelmine Adamović, a prostitute and daughter of a postman. Three days after their arrival, the maids left Geneva. In the meantime, Giron (who was with Louise's brother) contacted a notary in Brussels to lay a false trail to the Belgian capital. However, the siblings were identified in Geneva a few days later.

The escape of Louise was the first scandal of the German nobility in the 20th century. Baroness Hildegard von Spitzemberg noted in her diary:

"They were all met as we of the horrific scandals at the Saxon court, which were of unparalleled repulsiveness! Five children, a husband, a throne: leave all that at the age of 32 years to elope being expecting by the tutor of these children – it's downright dreadful!... Thus, when royal women forget themselves and all else considered decent, noble and catholic, they then forfeit the very right of existence."

Hermione von Preuschen, on the other hand, answered the “Louise Question” put to several female writers by the Neues Wiener Journal as follows:

"[...] first I was, like a teen-aged girl, full of jubilation that there is such a thing, such a great love that can trample throne and children, past and future in the dust, in order to chase after its star. It was an intoxication in me, a triumph – so yes! Throw down the glove to all convention, to all 'good manners' in pursuit of what one recognizes as the highest in one's nature – great passion. And then, with the transformation, with the 'remorse', an astonishment, a pity - that that too flew and shriveled and became small, like almost everything human. The disillusionment, the hangover - the morale! And what the good Philistines praise, the penitent Louise, I could weep for her."

Alice Gurschner said simply:

"Betrayed husbands, bad mothers and wives who envied you for Giron reviled you loudest."

Without consulting his son, George of Saxony declared the civil divorce of the Crown Princely couple on 11 February 1903 by a special court, which he had set up on 31 December 1902. One year later, on 15 October 1904, the Saxon monarch died after having his son, the new King Frederick Augustus III, to bar her from returning to the Dresden court. In Geneva, the former Crown Princess led a happy life and showed up with her lover in public, but, Louise unexpectedly separated from Giron for unknown reasons shortly before the divorce went through.

The paternity of her daughter, Anna Monika Pia, born in May 1903 at Lindau remained unclear. The Saxon court sent the director of the Dresden maternity hospital, Dr. Leopold, to Lindau to examine her and establish her true parentage. Due to her physical appearance and the bright colour of eyes and hair, he declared that the Crown Prince was her father, but refused to admit further medical opinions. She was therefore recognized by Frederick Augustus as his own. King George gave Louise an allowance and granted her the title of Countess of Montignoso (in allusion of her Tuscan ascendancy) on 13 July 1903; in turn, he demanded that Anna Monika Pia be sent to Dresden to be raised with the other royal children, but Louise adamantly refused.

=== Later life ===
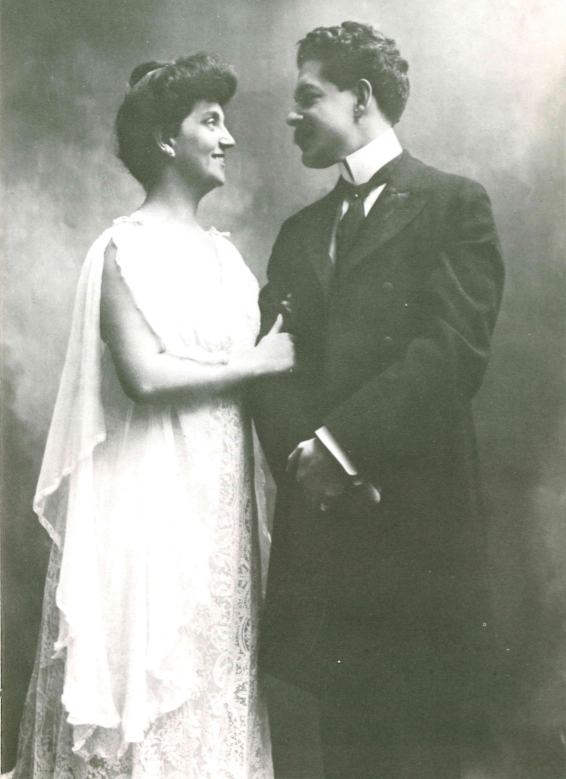
Louise and her second husband, Enrico Toselli

Louise lived firstly at Ramo Castle near Lyon, and then in 1903 at Ventnor Castle on the Isle of Wight. In 1904 she and her family moved to the Bourbon-Parma family seat of Wartegg Castle on Lake Constance, and later to Florence. In December 1904, she tried to see her older children at the Dresden Taschenbergpalais, but her attempts were unsuccessful because the police had surrounded the building. Later, Louise traveled in the company of her new lover, Conte Carlo Guicciardi, who lived separately from his wife but was still married.

Both Louise and her lover thought to return 2-year-old Anna Monika Pia to the Saxon court, but after an increase of the child's allowance from 30,000 to 40,000 marks was negotiated Louise changed her mind and refused to send her daughter to Dresden.

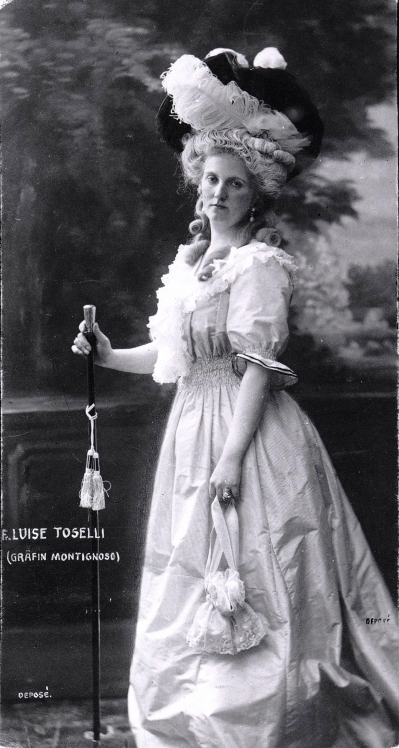
Louise dressed as Marie-Antoinette

In London, on 25 September 1907, Louise married the Italian musician Enrico Toselli, who was 12 years her junior. They had one son, Carlo Emmanuele Filiberto, born on 7 May 1908. Shortly after the wedding, Louise's former husband finally located Anna Monika Pia, who was sent to Dresden to live with her siblings and be raised as a member of the Saxon royal house. In 1908 Louise separated from Toselli, and they divorced in 1912; their son remained with his father.

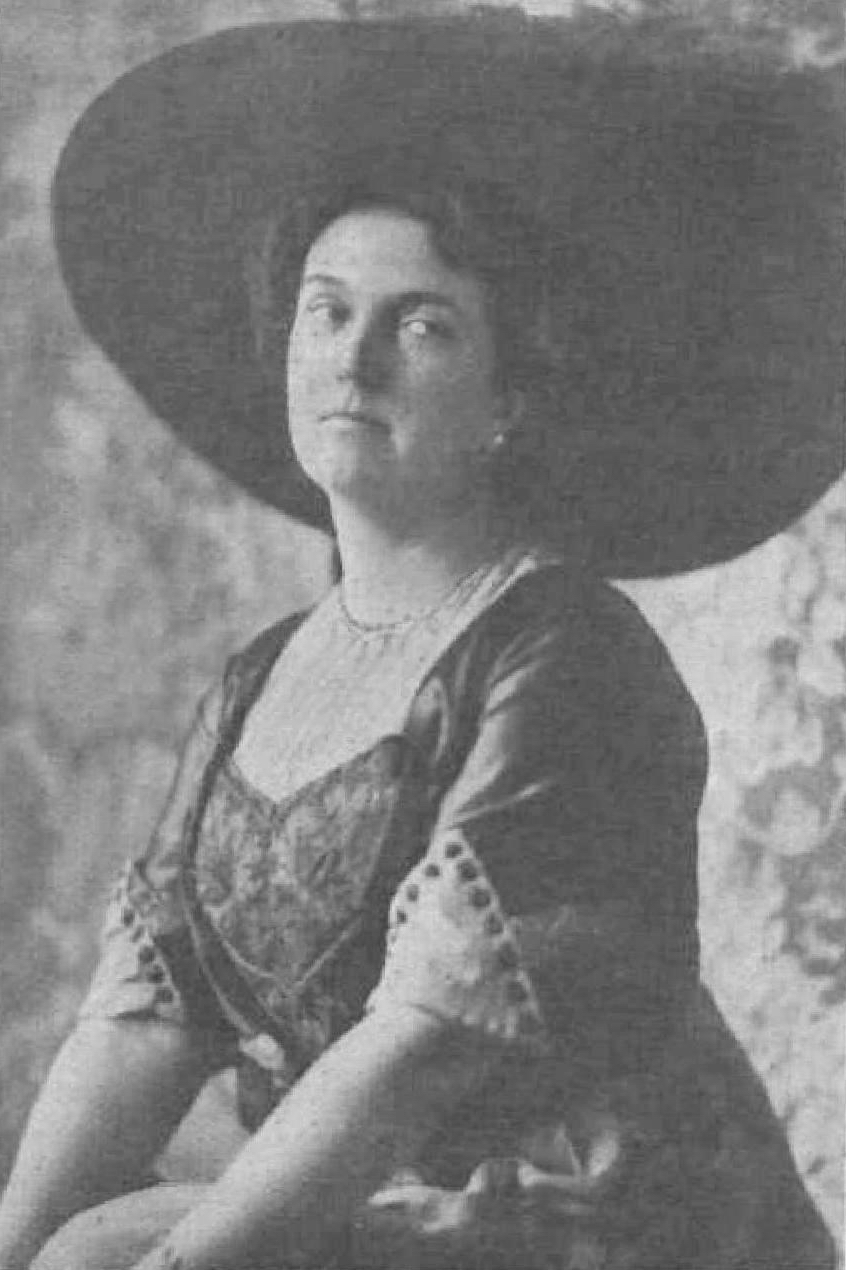
Louise photographed in 1911

In 1911, Louise published a memoir blaming her disgrace on her late father-in-law and Saxon politicians, who she claimed feared that, when she became queen, she would use her influence to dismiss them from office. She also claimed that her popularity exceeded that of her father-in-law, King George of Saxony, and her husband, the future king. Louise implied that her popularity had alienated her from the royal family and politicians. She ascribed her popularity to her insistence on ignoring the etiquette of the Saxon court and, perhaps to cast herself as a victim, compared herself with her Habsburg relative, Marie Antoinette, who disliked court rituals at Versailles and, like Louise, had avoided the noble courtiers who depended on those rituals to affirm their places at court.

After the Habsburg monarchy collapsed in 1918, Louise called herself "Antoinette Maria, Comtesse d'Ysette"; after some time in Mallorca with her uncle Archduke Ludwig Salvator of Austria, she moved to Brussels, where she initially lived in the suburb of Ixelles. Stripped of her imperial titles and dignities after her second marriage, she could no longer bear the surname of Habsburg. After the German invasion had ended the little support that Louise had from relatives, she suddenly became penniless. She died in poverty as a flower seller on 23 March 1947. Her urn was deposited in the Hedingen monastery in Sigmaringen, the burial place of the House of Hohenzollern, where a number of her children are buried nearby, including her son Prince Ernst Heinrich. Her estate is found in the Central State Archive of Dresden.

== Children ==
From first marriage:

- Friedrich August Georg, Crown Prince of Saxony (15 January 1893 – 14 May 1943), known as Iury. A priest, he renounced his rights in 1923.
- Friedrich Christian (31 December 1893 – 9 August 1968), known as Tia. Married Princess Elisabeth Helene of Thurn and Taxis and had issue.
- Ernst Heinrich (9 December 1896 – 14 June 1971), known as Erni. Married first Princess Sophie of Luxembourg and second Virginia Dulon (1910–2002) in 1947 (morganatically). Had issue with Sophie.
- Maria Alix Karola (stillborn 22 August 1898).
- Margarete Karola Wilhelmine Viktoria Adelheid Albertine Petrusa Bertram Paula (24 January 1900 – 16 October 1962), known as Ethe. Married Friedrich, Prince of Hohenzollern.
- Maria Alix Luitpolda Anna Henriette Germana Agnes Damiana Michaela (27 September 1901 – 11 December 1990), known as Riali. Married Franz Joseph, Prince of Hohenzollern-Emden.
- Anna Monika Pia (4 May 1903 – 8 February 1976). Married firstly Joseph Franz, Archduke of Austria and secondly Reginald Kazanjian.

From second marriage:

- Carlo Emmanuele Filiberto Toselli (7 May 1908 – 24 July 1969).

== Honours ==
- Austria-Hungary: Dame of the Order of the Starry Cross, 1st Class
- Spain: Dame of the Order of Queen Maria Luisa, 12 November 1891

== Bibliography ==
- Almanach de Gotha. Annuaire généalogique diplomatique et statistique, Dieterich u. a., Gotha 1.1764 - 181.1944 (editions 1887 and 1931)
- Louisa of Tuscany: My Own Story, Eveleigh Nash, London 1911.
- Luise von Österreich-Toskana: Mein Lebensweg, ed. Kunst, Dresden 2001, ISBN 3-86530-047-2
- Erika Bestenreiner: Luise von Toskana. Skandal am Königshof, Piper, Munich 2000, ISBN 3-492-23194-2
