= Timo von Sachsen =

Prince Timo of Saxony
- Prince of Saxony
- Born: Georg Timo Michael Nikolaus Maria Prinz von Sachsen; 22 December 1923; Munich, Bavaria, Germany
- Died: 22 April 1982 (aged 58); Emden, Lower Saxony, Germany
- Burial: Tholenswehr Cemetery, Emden, Germany
- Spouse: Margrit Lukas (m. 1952; died 1957) Charlotte Schwindack (m. 1966; div. 1974) Erna Eilts (m. 1974)
- Issue: Hermann von Sachsen; Rüdiger von Sachsen; Iris of Saxony
- Dynasty: Wettin
- Father: Prince Ernst Heinrich of Saxony
- Mother: Princess Sophie of Luxembourg
- Religion: Roman Catholicism

Timo von Sachsen (Georg Timo Michael Nikolaus Maria Prinz von Sachsen, 22 December 1923 – 22 April 1982) was a member of the House of Wettin, which ruled the Kingdom of Saxony until the monarchy was abolished in 1918.

== Biography ==
Georg Timo Michael Nikolaus Maria Prinz von Sachsen was born on 22 December 22, 1923, he was the second son of Prince Ernst Heinrich of Saxony, and Princess Sophie of Luxembourg, making the grandson of Frederick Augustus III and William IV of Luxembourg.

=== Marriage and children ===
Timo was married three times.

On August 7, 1952, Timo married his first wife, Margrit Lukas (born 5 December 1923), before her death on 6 June 1957, he had two children with her:

1. Rüdiger von Sachsen (1952 – 2022)
2. Iris von Sachsen (1955)

On 3 February 1966 (religious ceremony on February 5), he married Charlotte Schwindack (born 11 March 1919), the couple divorced on 6 February 1973.

On 26 March 1974, Timo married Erna Eilts.

Timo also had an illegitimate son, Hermann (born 25 May 1950), with Erika Montanus.
