= Princess Sophie of Luxembourg =

Luxembourgish princess (1902–1941)

- Princess Ernst Heinrich of Saxony
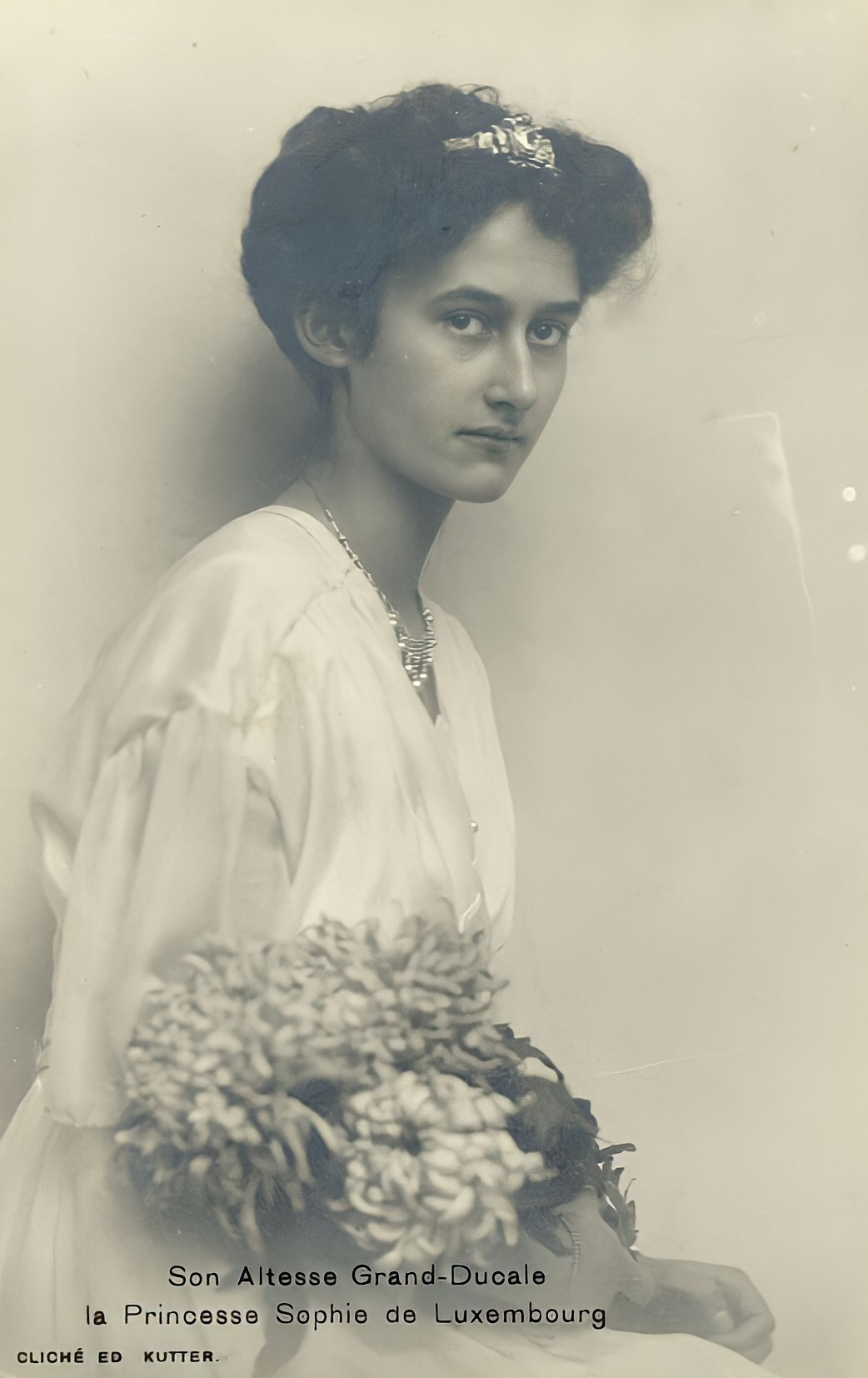
- Princess Sophie, c. 1920
- Born: 14 February 1902; Berg Castle, Colmar-Berg, Luxembourg
- Died: 24 May 1941 (aged 39); Munich, Bavaria, Nazi Germany
- Burial: Katholische Hofkirche, Dresden, Saxony, Germany
- Spouse: Prince Ernst Heinrich of Saxony (m. 1921)
- Issue: Prince Dedo; Prince Timo; Prince Gero
Names
- French: Sophie Caroline Marie Wilhelmine
- House: House of Nassau-Weilburg (by birth); House of Wettin (by marriage)
- Father: William IV, Grand Duke of Luxembourg
- Mother: Infanta Marie Anne of Portugal

Princess Sophie of Luxembourg (14 February 1902 – 24 May 1941) was a Princess of Luxembourg by birth and a Princess of Saxony by virtue of her marriage.

== Early life ==
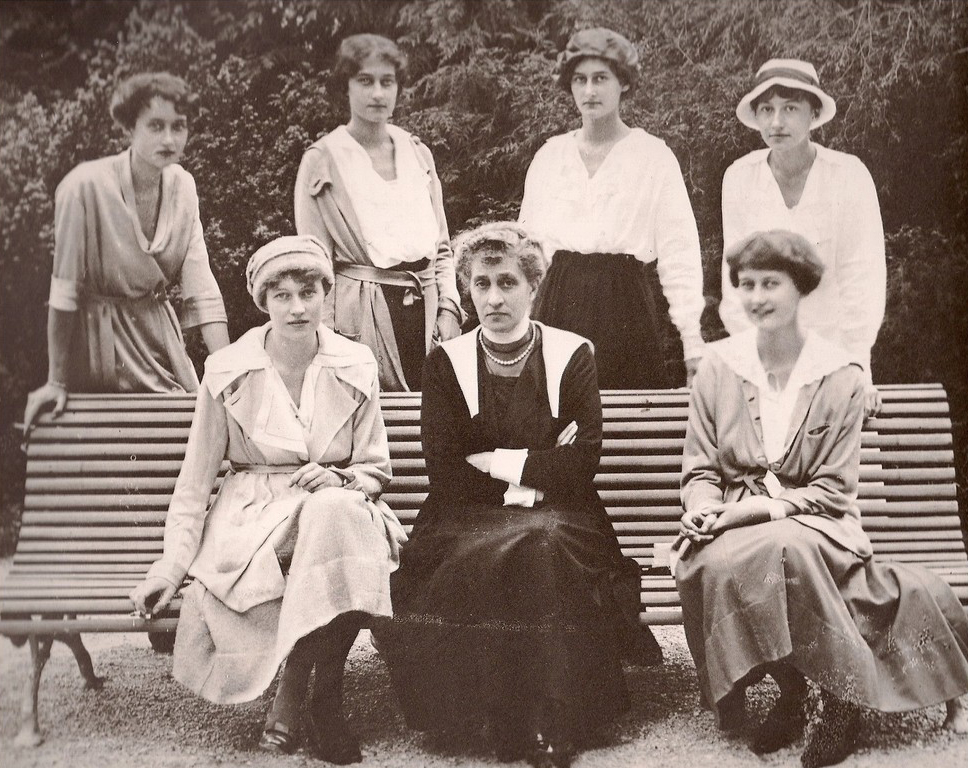
Sophie with her mother and sisters, 1920.

Princess Sophie was born on 14 February 1902 at Berg Castle in Colmar-Berg, Luxembourg, as the youngest daughter of William IV, Grand Duke of Luxembourg and his wife, Infanta Marie Anne of Portugal. Through her mother, she was a granddaughter of the deposed King Miguel I of Portugal. Within her private family environment, she was known by the childhood nickname "Soffel". By birth, Sophie was a member of the House of Nassau-Weilburg, a cadet line of the House of Nassau. Because her father produced no male heirs, her childhood was defined by changes to the grand ducal family's house laws to allow female succession. Consequently, her elder sisters Marie-Adélaïde and Charlotte sequentially acceded to the throne of Luxembourg as reigning grand duchesses, while Sophie spent her formative youth raised primarily at Berg Castle and Schloss Hohenburg in Bavaria.

== Marriage and issue ==
On 12 April 1921, Princess Sophie married Prince Ernst Heinrich of Saxony at Schloss Hohenburg. He was the youngest son of King Frederick Augustus III of Saxony and Archduchess Luise of Austria, Princess of Tuscany.

Together, the marriage produced three sons:

- Prince Albrecht Friedrich August Johannes Gregor Dedo of Saxony (1922–2009)
- Prince Georg Timo Michael Nikolaus Maria of Saxony (1923–1982), married Margrit Lucas in 1952, fathering two children, including Rüdiger von Sachsen. Following her death, he remarried to Charlotte Schwindack in 1966, from whom he was later divorced in 1973, and subsequently contracted a third marriage to Erina Eilts in 1974.
- Prince Rupprecht Hubertus Gero Maria of Saxony (1925–2003)

== Death ==
Princess Sophie died of pneumonia on 24 May 1941 at the age of 39 in Munich. She was interred in the Neue Gruft within the Hofkirche in Dresden, Saxony. Following her death, Prince Ernst Heinrich contracted a second, morganatic marriage to Virginia Dulon on 28 June 1947 in Paris.

== Bibliography ==
- Kremer, Guy (2001). Luxemburgische Prinzessinnen in Europa. Luxembourg: Éditions Saint-Paul. ISBN 978-2879633657.
- Sachsen, Albert von (1995). Die Wettiner in Lebensbildern. Graz: Styria Verlag. ISBN 978-3222123016.
- Généalogie des rois et des princes de Jean-Charles Volkmann Edit. Jean-Paul Giserot (1998)
