= Moritzburg, Saxony =

- Municipality
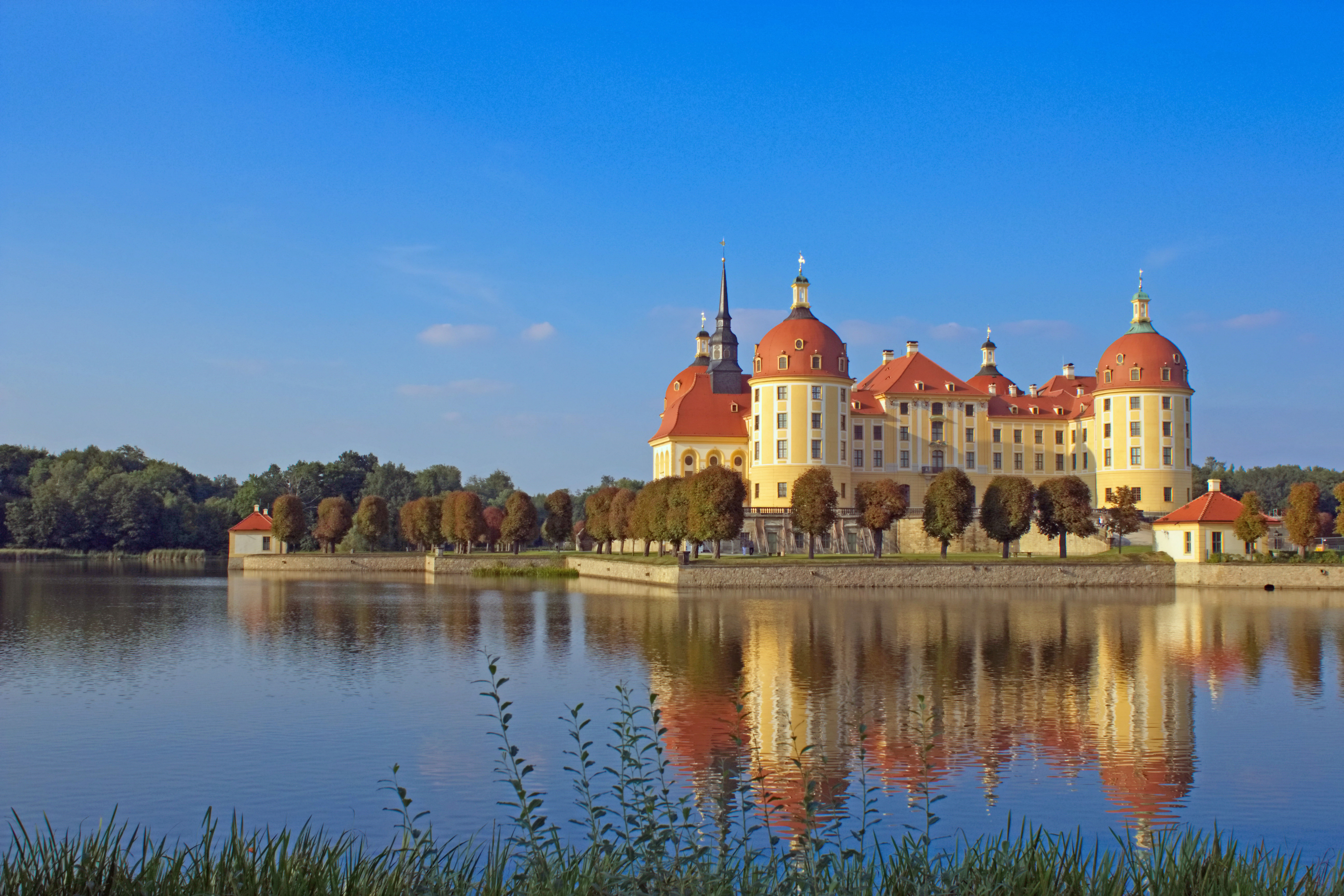
- Schloss Moritzburg

- Coat of arms

- Location of Moritzburg, Saxony within Meißen district
- Interactive map of Moritzburg, Saxony
- Location within Germany Location within Saxony
- Coordinates: 51°09′54″N 13°40′46″E
- Country: Germany
- State: Saxony
- District: Meißen

Government
  - Mayor (2020–27): Jörg Hänisch (Ind.)

Area
  - Total: 46.49 km^{2} (17.95 sq mi)
- Elevation: 166 m (545 ft)

Population (2025-12-31)
  - Total: 8,171
  - Density: 175.8/km^{2} (455.2/sq mi)
- Time zone: UTC+01:00 (CET)
  - Summer (DST): UTC+02:00 (CEST)
- Postal codes: 01466–01468
- Dialling codes: 035207, 0351
- Vehicle registration: MEI, GRH, RG, RIE
- Website: www.moritzburg.de

Moritzburg (German pronunciation: [ˈmoːʁɪtsˌbʊʁk]) is a municipality in the district of Meissen in Saxony, Germany, between Meissen itself, an early centre of Saxony, and today's capital Dresden. It is most famous for its Baroque castle, Schloss Moritzburg.

The village, which was originally known as Eisenburg, was first mentioned in 1294. It became a market in 1675. The Saxon state stud has been located here since 1828. In 1884, a narrow-gauge railway, the Radebeul–Radeburg line, was built connecting the town to the district capital Radebeul and Radeburg. It was renamed Moritzburg, after the nearby castle, in 1934. German artist Käthe Kollwitz lived at the invitation of Prince Ernst Heinrich von Wettin in the Rüdenhof in Moritzburg from 1944 until her death on 22 April 1945. In 1995, a small museum was opened in the Rüdenhof.

== Twin towns ==
- Cochem, Germany.

== Personalities ==
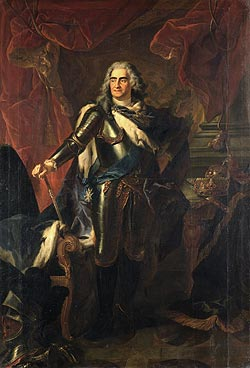
Augustus II the Strong in 1718.

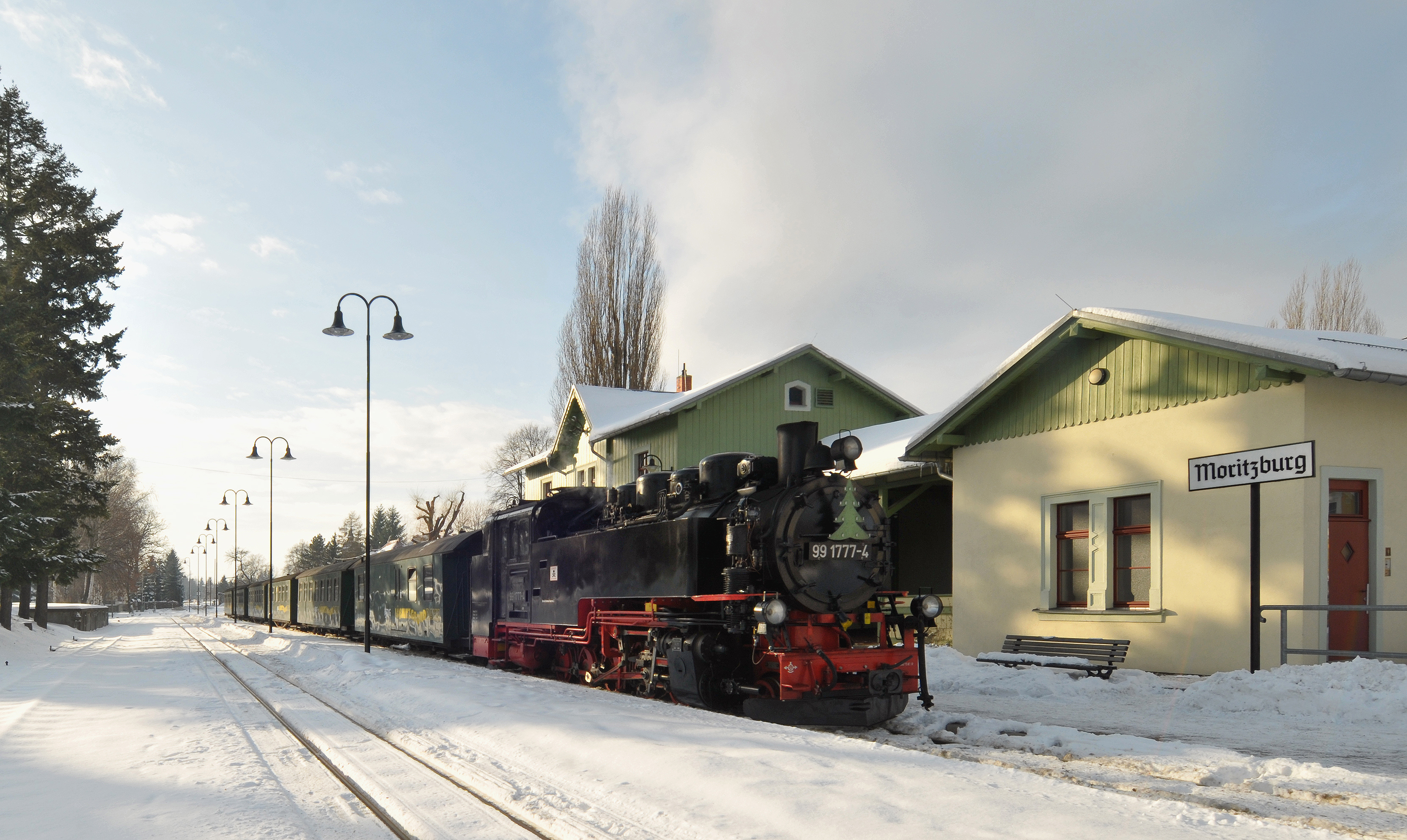
The VEB Lokomotivbau Karl Marx Babelsberg (LKM) built 1956 this steam locomotive No. 991777-4. Today pulls the locomotive the heritage railway by the Radebeul–Radeburg railway, also known as the Lößnitzgrundbahn (Lössnitzgrund Railway). The Radebeul–Radeburg railway runs between Radebeul East station and the small towns of Moritzburg and Radeburg north of Dresden.

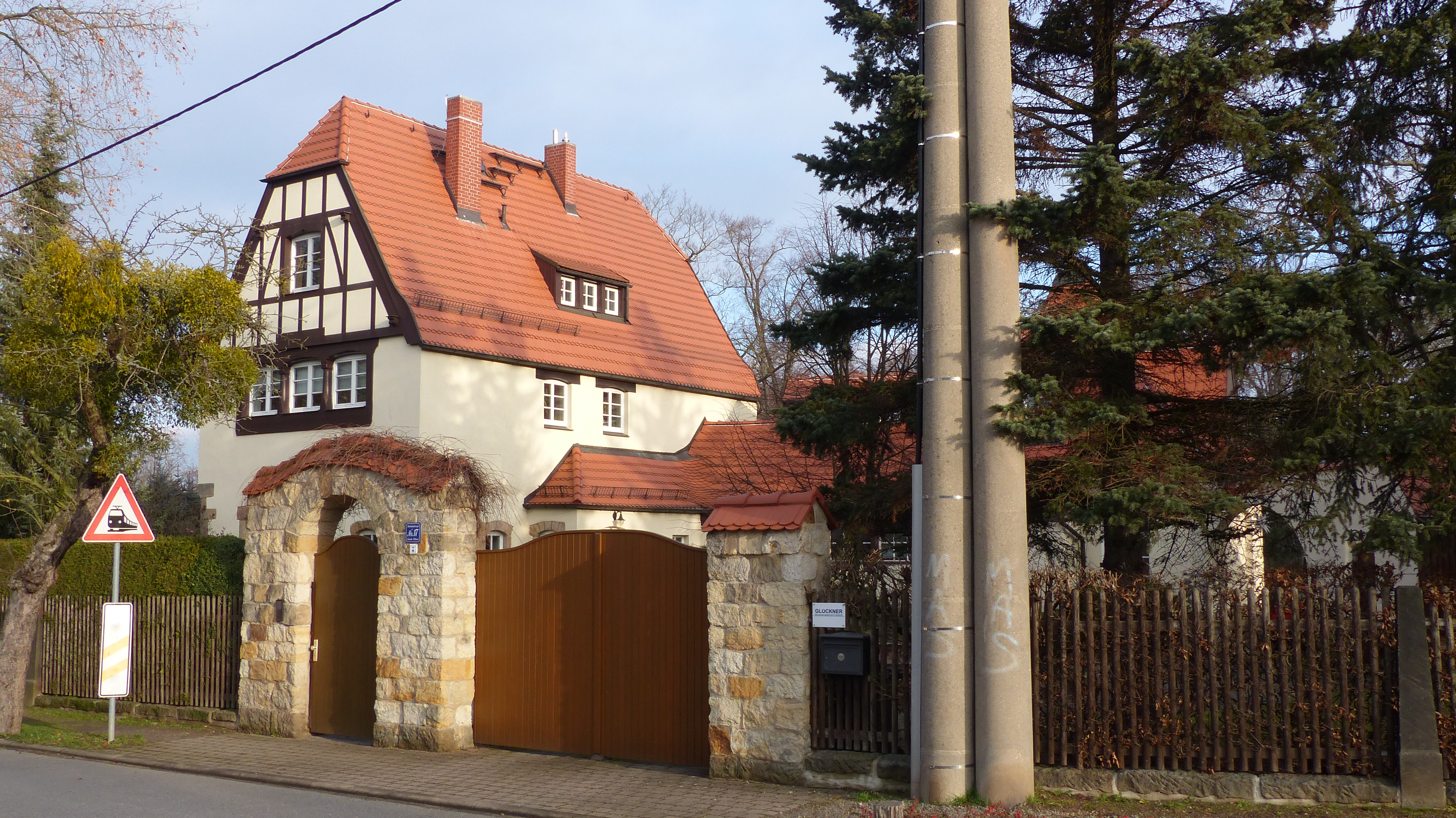
Bahnhofstraße 17, built in 1902 for Alfred Mailick

=== Sons of the place ===
- Albert Casimir, Duke of Teschen (1738–1822), artistic patron
- Martin Dulig, Minister of State in Saxony

=== Other personalities associated with the place ===
- Maurice, Elector of Saxony (1521–1553), Elector
- Augustus II the Strong (1670–1733), Elector of Saxony, King of Poland
- Frederick Augustus I of Saxony (1750–1827), first king of Saxony
- Käthe Kollwitz (1867–1945), artist
- Alfred Mailick (1869–1946), artist, spent much of his life in Moritzburg and built a house in the Bahnhofstraße designed by Richard Riemerschmid.
- Prince Ernst Heinrich of Saxony (1896–1971), Wettiner
- Jan Vogler (born 1964), cellist and artistic director of the Moritzburg Festival
