= Prince Ernst Heinrich of Saxony =

Saxon royal (1896–1971)

- Ernst Heinrich in 1911
- Born: 9 December 1896; Dresden, Kingdom of Saxony, German Empire
- Died: 14 June 1971 (aged 74); Edingen-Neckarhausen, Rhein-Neckar-Kreis, Baden-Württemberg, West Germany
- Spouse: Princess Sophie of Luxembourg (m. 1921; died 1941) Virginia Dulon (m. 1947)
- Issue: Prince Dedo; Prince Timo; Prince Gero
Names
- German: Ernst Heinrich Ferdinand Franz Joseph Otto Maria Melchiades; English: Ernest Henry Ferdinand Francis Joseph Otto Maria Melchiades
- House: Wettin (Albertine line)
- Father: Frederick Augustus III of Saxony
- Mother: Archduchess Luise of Austria, Princess of Tuscany

Prince Ernst Heinrich of Saxony, Duke of Saxony (Ernst Heinrich Ferdinand Franz Joseph Otto Maria Melchiades; 9 December 1896 – 14 June 1971), was a member of the House of Wettin and the youngest son of the last reigning King of Saxony, Frederick Augustus III, and Archduchess Luise of Austria, Princess of Tuscany.

== Life ==
Prince Ernst Heinrich spent his childhood in Dresden, Pillnitz, and Moritzburg under the oversight of his father. The permanent departure of his mother in 1902 profoundly affected the grand ducal household, leaving a lasting impact on Ernst Heinrich during his formative youth.

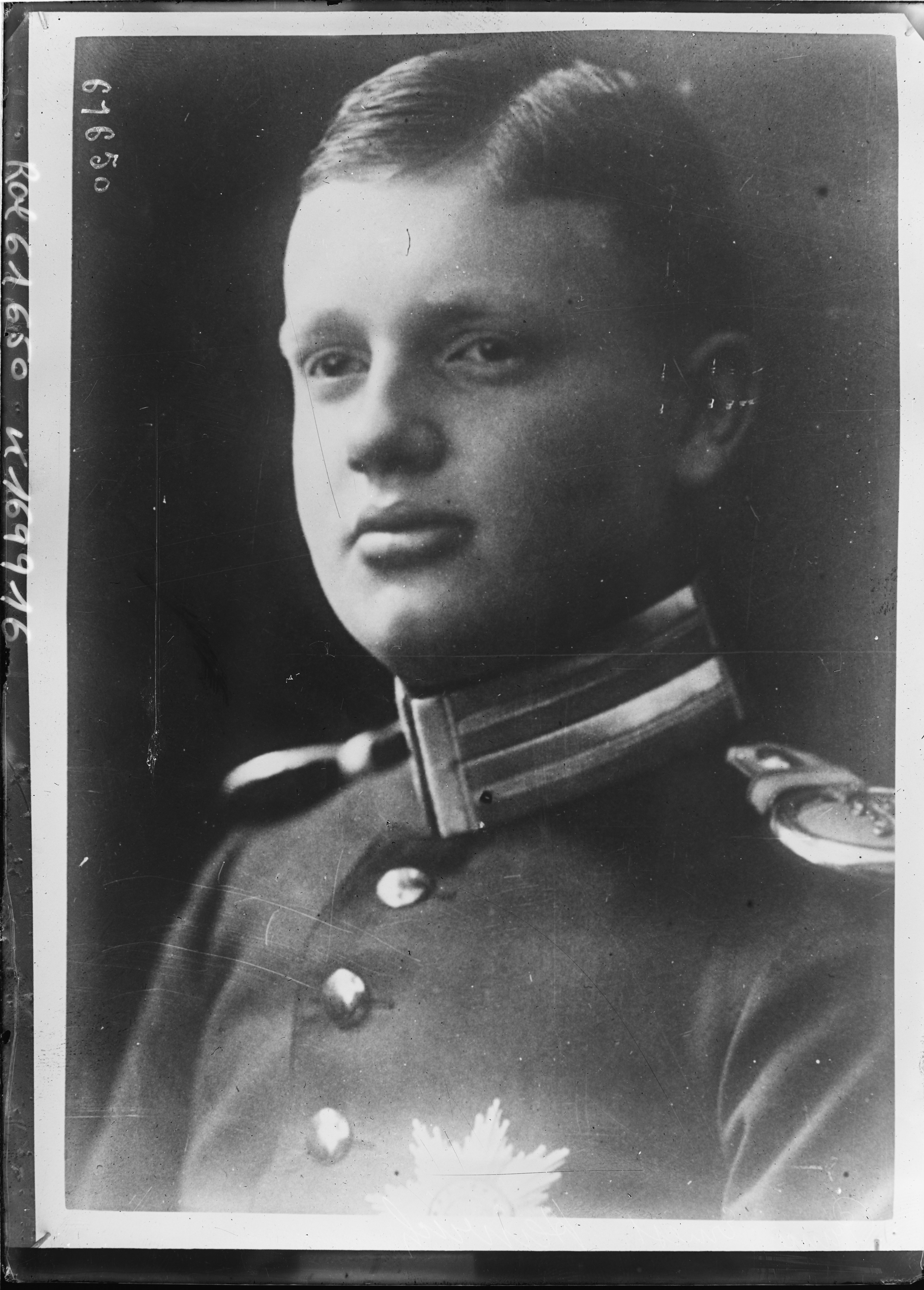
Prince Ernest Heinrich, 1920.

=== World War I ===
Upon the outbreak of World War I, Ernst Heinrich served as a first lieutenant in the 1st Royal Saxon Leib-Grenadier-Regiment Nr. 100. In September 1914, he was appointed as a staff officer in the General Kommando of the XIX (2nd Royal Saxon) Corps during operations at Reims and Lille. He completed his Abitur during a temporary military leave in 1916, subsequently participating in the Battle of the Somme on the staff of the 24th Reserve Division. For his military service, he was awarded the Military Order of St. Henry on 30 August 1916.

In 1917, he assumed command of the 9th Company of Reserve-Infantry Regiment No. 104 in Berezhany, and later commanded the 9th Battery of Artillery Regiment No. 115 near Ypres. By May 1918, he led the 1st Squadron of Mounted Guard Regiments at Stary Bychow in Russia, and later oversaw the Saxon military detachments in Dorpat, Reval, and Finland, eventually managing the repatriation of Saxon troops to Germany in December 1918.

=== Interwar era and Nazi period ===
During the political upheavals of 1920, Ernst Heinrich acted as a liaison officer in Wrocław during the Kapp Putsch before relocating to Munich, where he joined the conservative circle surrounding Rupprecht, Crown Prince of Bavaria. On 12 April 1921, he married Princess Sophie of Luxembourg at the Nymphenburg Palace. Following the 1923 developments in Bavaria, he consistently rejected National Socialist ideology, maintaining a strict distance from Adolf Hitler. At his father's request, he took over the administration of the family association, negotiating the formal 1925 treaty with the Free State of Saxony regarding the status of the Wettin estates and art collections.

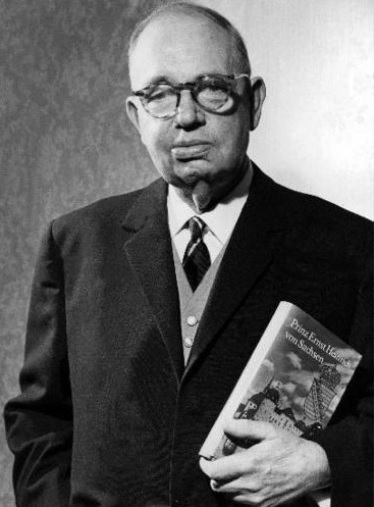
Prince Ernest Heinrich, 1960.

Ernst Heinrich opposed the National Socialist government following its establishment in 1933. During the Night of the Long Knives on 1 July 1934, he was arrested by the regime and interned at the Hohnstein concentration camp for five days. Upon his release, he retired to Moritzburg Castle, where he maintained necessary administrative contact with regional officials regarding the family's forestry assets. During the late 1930s and World War II, he engaged in political discussions with figures of the German resistance, including Carl Friedrich Goerdeler. He openly questioned the official circumstances surrounding the accidental death of his brother, Georg, Crown Prince of Saxony, in 1943, leading to Gestapo interrogation. During this period, he acted as a patron to the artist Käthe Kollwitz, providing her refuge at Moritzburg until her death in April 1945.

=== Post-war period and death ===
In March 1945, Ernst Heinrich fled to Sigmaringen to escape the advance of the Soviet Red Army, after arranging the concealment of the family's historical valuables in the Königswald forest. While the majority of these hidden assets were seized by Soviet forces, a portion of the buried items was successfully recovered in 1995. In 1947, he married the actress Virginia Dulon and subsequently purchased the Coolamber estate in County Westmeath, Ireland, where he engaged in agricultural management. He died on 14 June 1971 during a temporary visit to Neckarhausen, West Germany.

== Marriages and issue ==
From his first marriage to Princess Sophie of Luxembourg (1902–1941), daughter of William IV, Grand Duke of Luxembourg, Ernst Heinrich had three sons:

- Prince Dedo of Saxony (1922–2009).
- Prince Timo of Saxony (1923–1982), married Margrit Lucas in 1952, and subsequently remarried Charlotte Schwindack in 1966, leaving issue, including Rüdiger von Sachsen.
- Prince Gero of Saxony (1925–2003).

In 1947, he married Virginia Dulon (1910–2002), a union that produced no additional issue.

== Honours ==
- Kingdom of Prussia: Knight of the Order of the Black Eagle
- Kingdom of Saxony: Knight of the Order of the Rue Crown

== Ancestry ==
Ancestors of Prince Ernst Heinrich of Saxony

8. John of Saxony
4. George of Saxony
9. Princess Amalie Auguste of Bavaria
2. Frederick Augustus III of Saxony
10. Fernando II of Portugal
5. Infanta Maria Ana of Portugal
11. Maria II of Portugal
1. Prince Ernst Heinrich of Saxony
12. Leopold II, Grand Duke of Tuscany
6. Ferdinand IV, Grand Duke of Tuscany
13. Princess Maria Antonia of the Two Sicilies
3. Archduchess Louise of Austria
14. Charles III, Duke of Parma
7. Princess Alice of Bourbon-Parma
15. Princess Louise d'Artois

== Publication ==
- Adelsarchiv, Deutsches (2015). Gothaisches Genealogisches Handbuch: Fürstliche Häuser (in German). Marburg: Verlag des Deutschen Adelsarchivs. ISBN 978-3981724301.
- Sachsen, Albert von (1995). Die Wettiner in Lebensbildern (in German). Graz: Styria Verlag. ISBN 978-3222123016.
- Prinz Ernst Heinrich von Sachsen: Mein Lebensweg vom Königsschloss zum Bauernhof, 4th ed, Verlag der Kunst Dresden, Husum, 2010, ISBN 978-3-86530-015-7 (in German)
