= Moritzburg Castle =

Castle in Saxony, Germany

Coordinates: 51°10′3.26″N 13°40′46.60″E

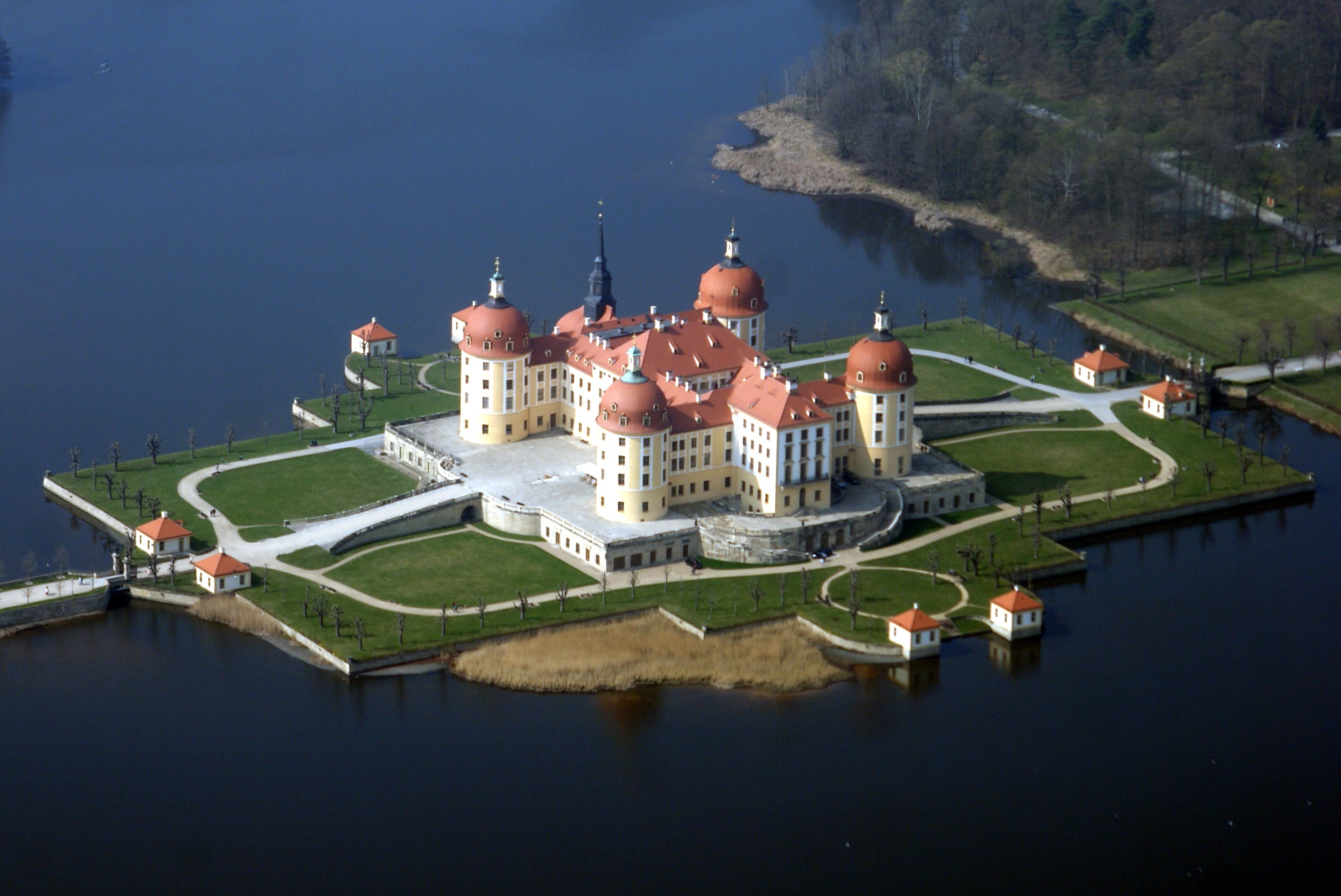
Moritzburg, Saxony

Moritzburg Castle, Saxony

Moritzburg Castle (German: Schloss Moritzburg) or Moritzburg Palace is a Baroque palace in Moritzburg, in the German state of Saxony, about 13 kilometres (8.1 mi) northwest of the Saxon capital, Dresden. The castle has four round towers and lies on a symmetrical artificial island. It is named after Duke Moritz of Saxony, who had a hunting lodge built there between 1542 and 1546. The surrounding woodlands and lakes were a favourite hunting area of the electors and kings of Saxony.

== History ==
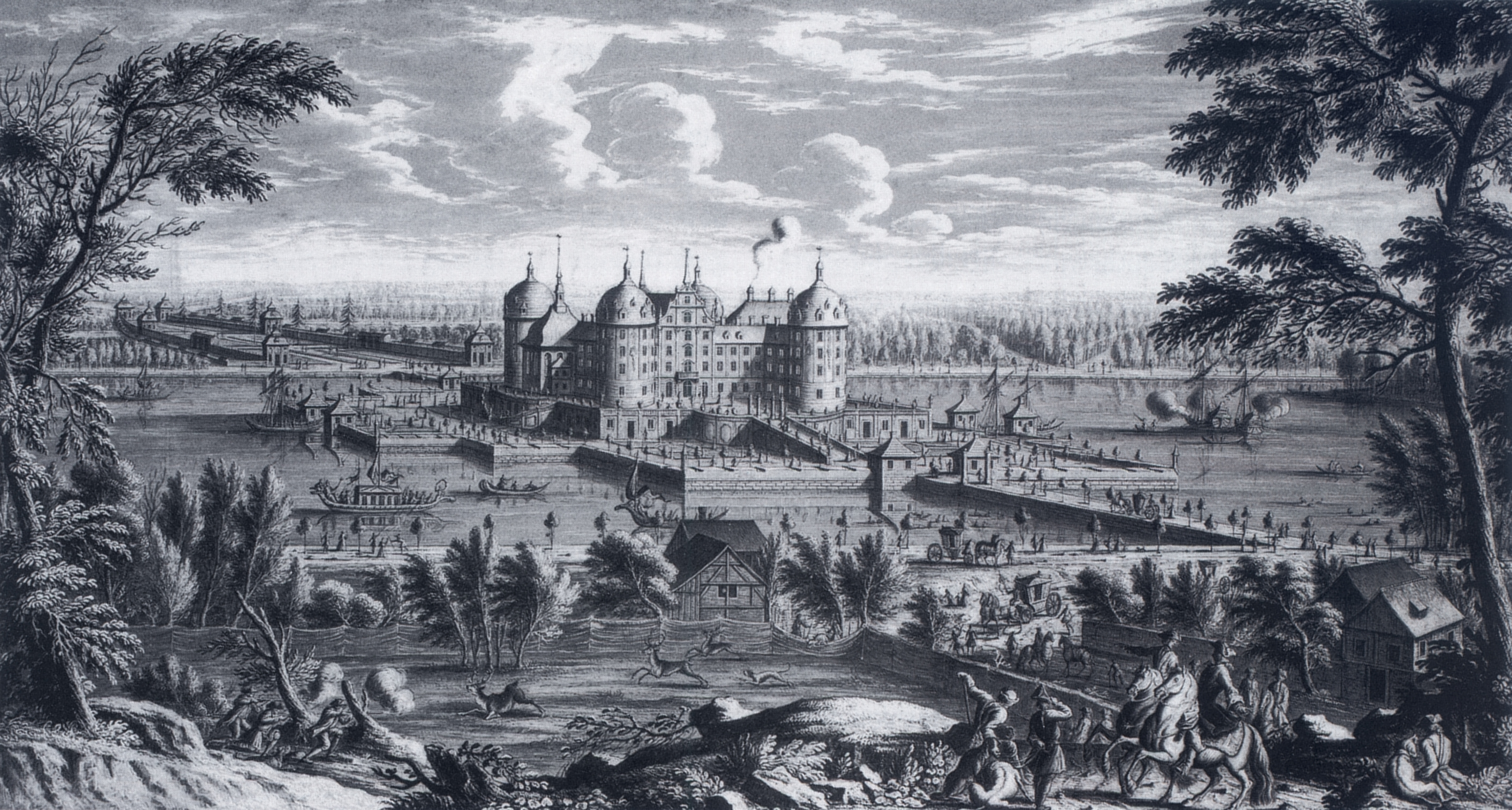
Moritzburg Castle in 1733

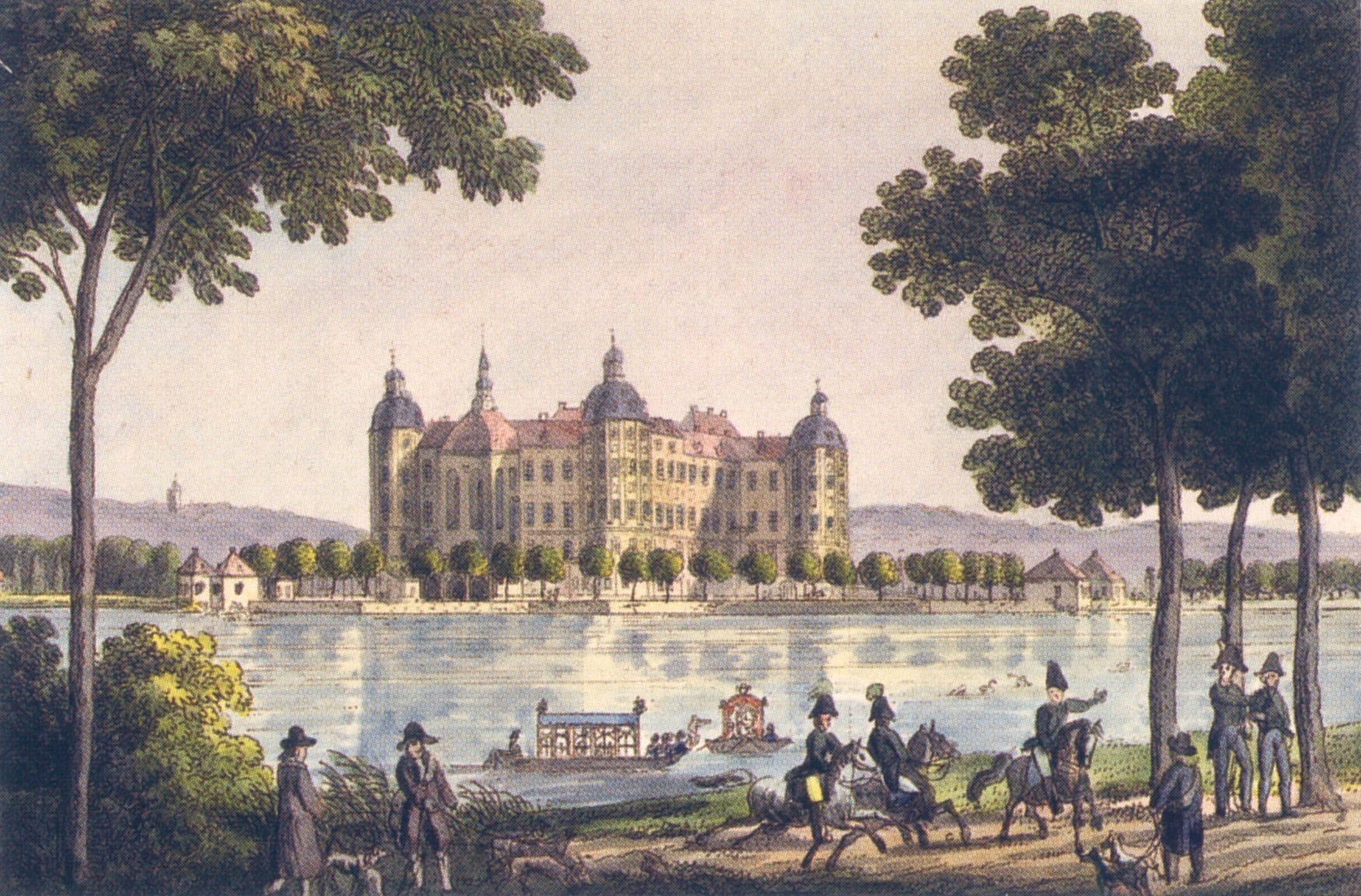
Moritzburg Castle around 1800

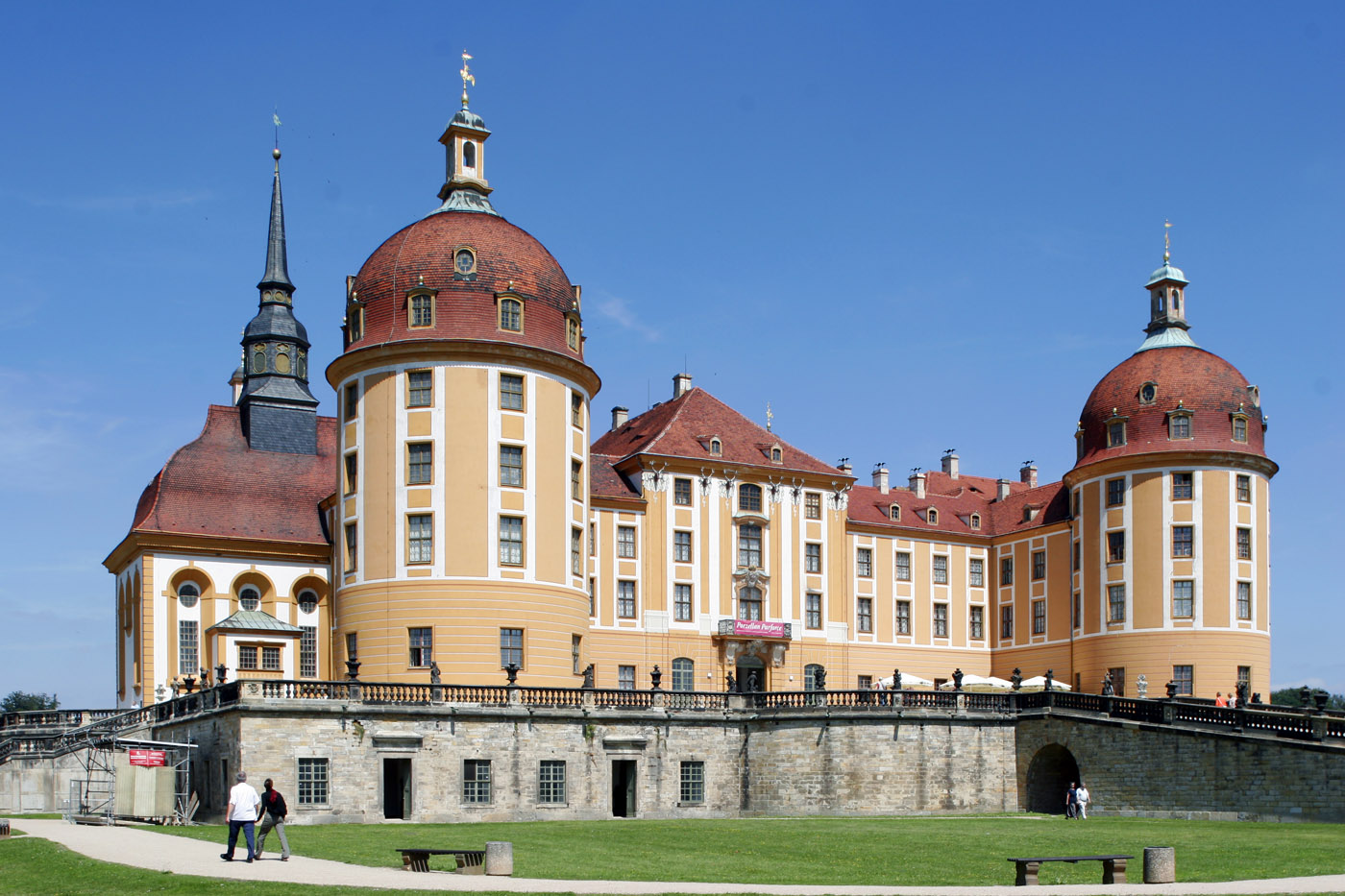
The castle today

The original castle, built from 1542 to 1546, was a hunting lodge for Moritz of Saxony, then Duke of Saxony. Elector John George II of Saxony had the lodge extended; the chapel was added between 1661 and 1671. Designed by his architect, Wolf Caspar von Klengel, the chapel is an example of early Baroque architecture.

The chapel was consecrated in a Catholic rite in 1697, after the grandson of John George II, Elector Augustus II the Strong, converted to Catholicism in order to secure his election as King of Poland. Between 1723 and 1733, Augustus had the castle remodelled as a country seat by architects Matthäus Daniel Pöppelmann and Zacharias Longuelune, adding a formal park, several ponds and a game preserve.

The surroundings of the castle were further developed by Elector Frederick Augustus III of Saxony, a great-grandson of Augustus II the Strong, at the end of the 18th century. The Little Pheasant Castle (Fasanenschlösschen) was built between 1770 and 1776. The grounds were extended to include a building for the storage of bird nests, the large Well of Venus, living quarters for Count Camillo Marcolini and a maritime setting on the Great Lake complete with a miniature harbour with jetty and lighthouse.

Prince Ernst Heinrich of Saxony, who lived in the castle between 1933 and 1945, was the last resident of the House of Wettin. He was dispossessed in 1945 by the postwar Soviet administration.

== Interior of the castle ==
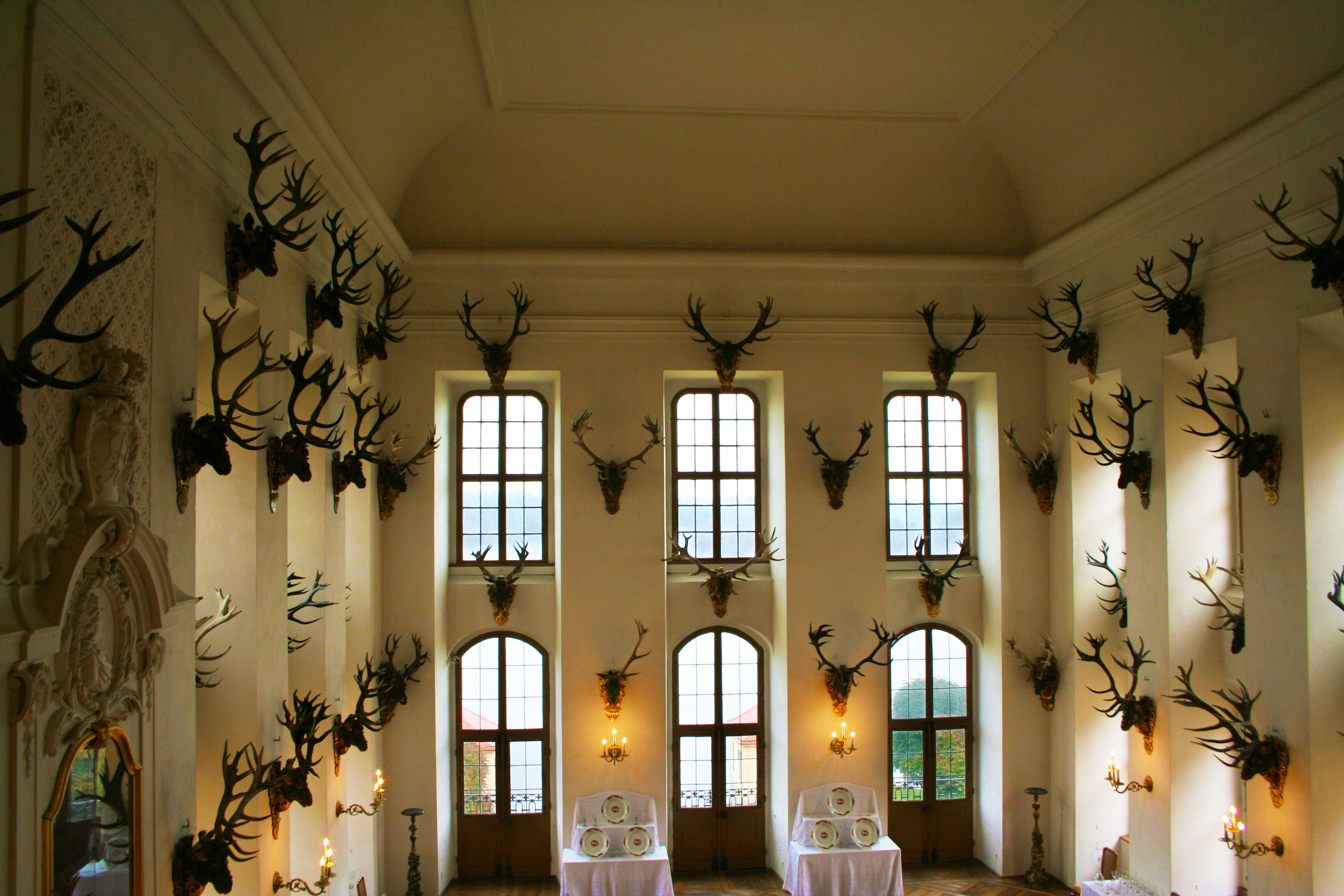
Collection of deer antlers

The interior of the castle is furnished with examples of opulent baroque decor from the time of Augustus the Strong. The walls are covered in 17th-century gold-gilded leather. Many rooms' furnishings are dedicated to courtly hunting.

The castle's largest collection of antlers is shown in the Speisesaal ("dining room"). Most of its 71 trophies are between 270 and 400 years old; they were purchased or acquired as presents. Among them is the heaviest red deer antler in the world, weighing 19.8 kilograms (44 lb) and spanning almost 2 metres (6.6 ft). In the Monströsensaal ("monstrosity room"), there are 39 contorted antlers. One specimen, a 66-point red deer antler, is from an animal killed by Elector Frederick III of Brandenburg in 1696.

In 1723, Augustus the Strong acquired a four-poster bed for his Japanese palace. It had approximately a million peacock, pheasant, guinea hen and duck feathers woven into the canvas. Rather than gluing or tying the feathers onto the canvas, they were woven in as weft. Upon acquisition, Augustus had the curtains removed and turned into wall hangings, inspiring the room's name, Federzimmer, or "feather room". This ensemble was moved to Schloss Moritzburg in 1830. Following an extensive 19-year restoration, the bed and wall hangings have been on view again since 2003.

Examples of Chinese, Japanese, and Meissen porcelain are shown in the historical Porzellanquartier ("porcelain quarter"). This exhibition displays porcelain depicting hunting, exotic, and mythological motifs as well as animal figurines that relate to Moritzburg's original determination as a hunting lodge.

The apartments contain examples of opulence in the lacquered and ornate furniture, such as the Augsburg-made silver furniture styled after Louis XIV's silver furniture at Versailles. There are also engraved and inlaid weapons for hunting. The Billiardsaal ("billiards hall"), named after a former billiard table in it, contains monumental paintings on leather by Louis de Silvestre. Eleven rooms are decorated with painted leather wallpaper from the 17th century.

A collection of royal carriages is shown in the entrance hall.

== Park and surroundings ==
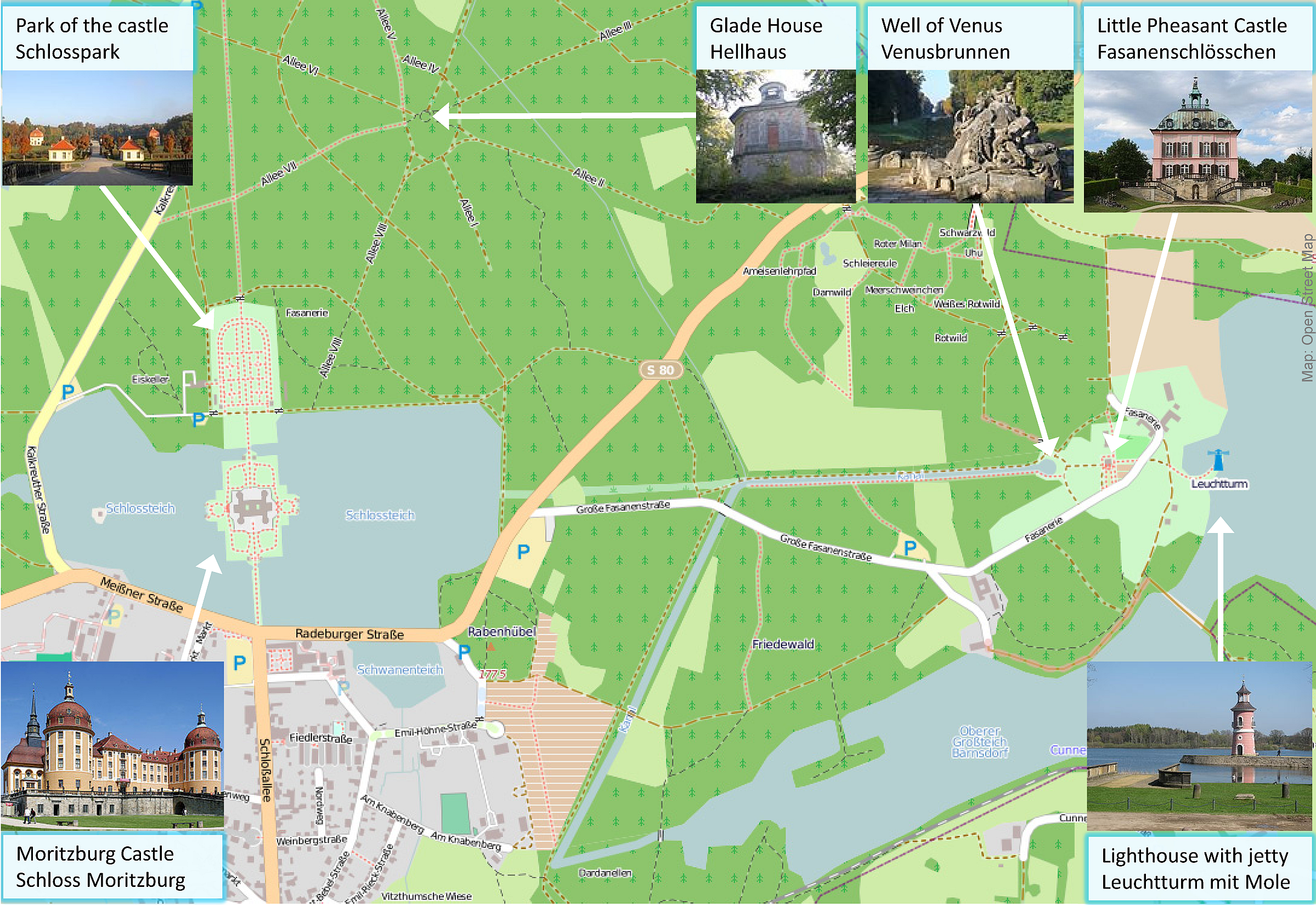
Map of park and surroundings

In 1728, a park was added to the castle on the adjacent land to the north. The U-shaped park has an area of approximately 230 by 150 meters. The gardens are in the French style and, because of the death of Augustus the Strong, were never completed. Johann Christian Daniel, Matthäus Daniel Pöppelmann, and others were involved in their initial design and planning. The garden's layout follows that of other European royal courts of the time.

During the 19th century, rare plants were added, and the garden was developed into a park in the romantic style.

An 8-arm, star-shaped system of alleys was cut through the Friedewald, the forest on the northern side of the property. In particular, it was designed for royal fox hunting with hounds. The ruins of the Hellhaus ("glade house"), built in 1787 and designed by Johann Daniel Schade, can be found on a raised point at the intersection of the paths. It served the court hunting parties because from here, the so-called "swan keeper" would indicate the direction of flight of the game they hunted. This was done using flags, which he would raise from the top of the building.

One alley running directly east visually connects the castle with the Fasanenschlösschen ("Little Pheasant Castle"), 2.5 kilometres (1.6 miles) away. Not far from the Fasanenschlösschen is the Well of Venus, one of the largest Baroque fountains in Saxony. It symbolizes the eastern end of a canal, which runs parallel to this corridor most of the time.

During the reconstruction phase of the palace from 1723 until 1733, the large pond surrounding the castle's artificial island was built from what were originally four smaller ponds. The other ponds in the Friedewald date from the 16th century and have been used for carp production since then. The channels connecting the ponds allow one to "fish" the carp by draining the water.

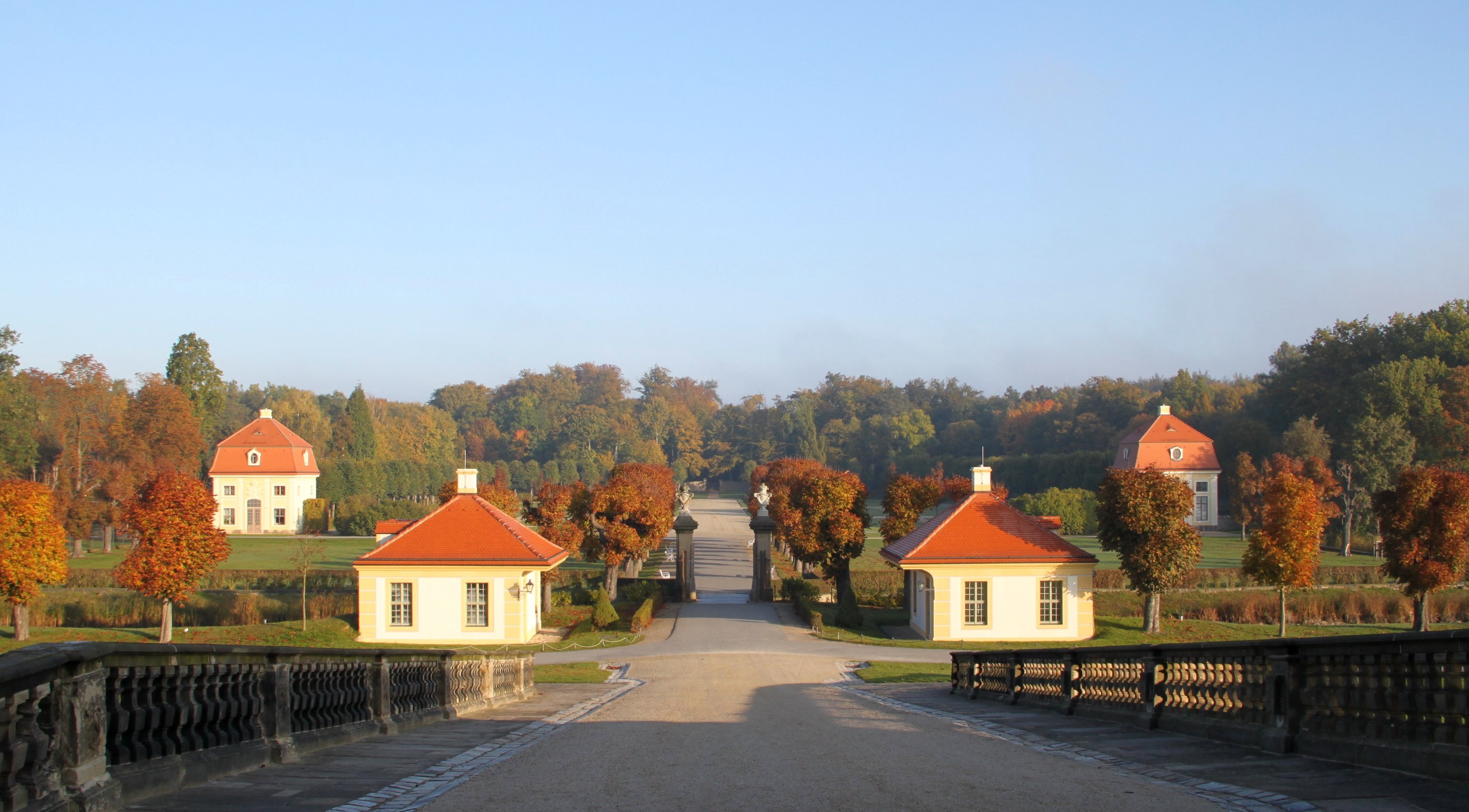
The park of the castle

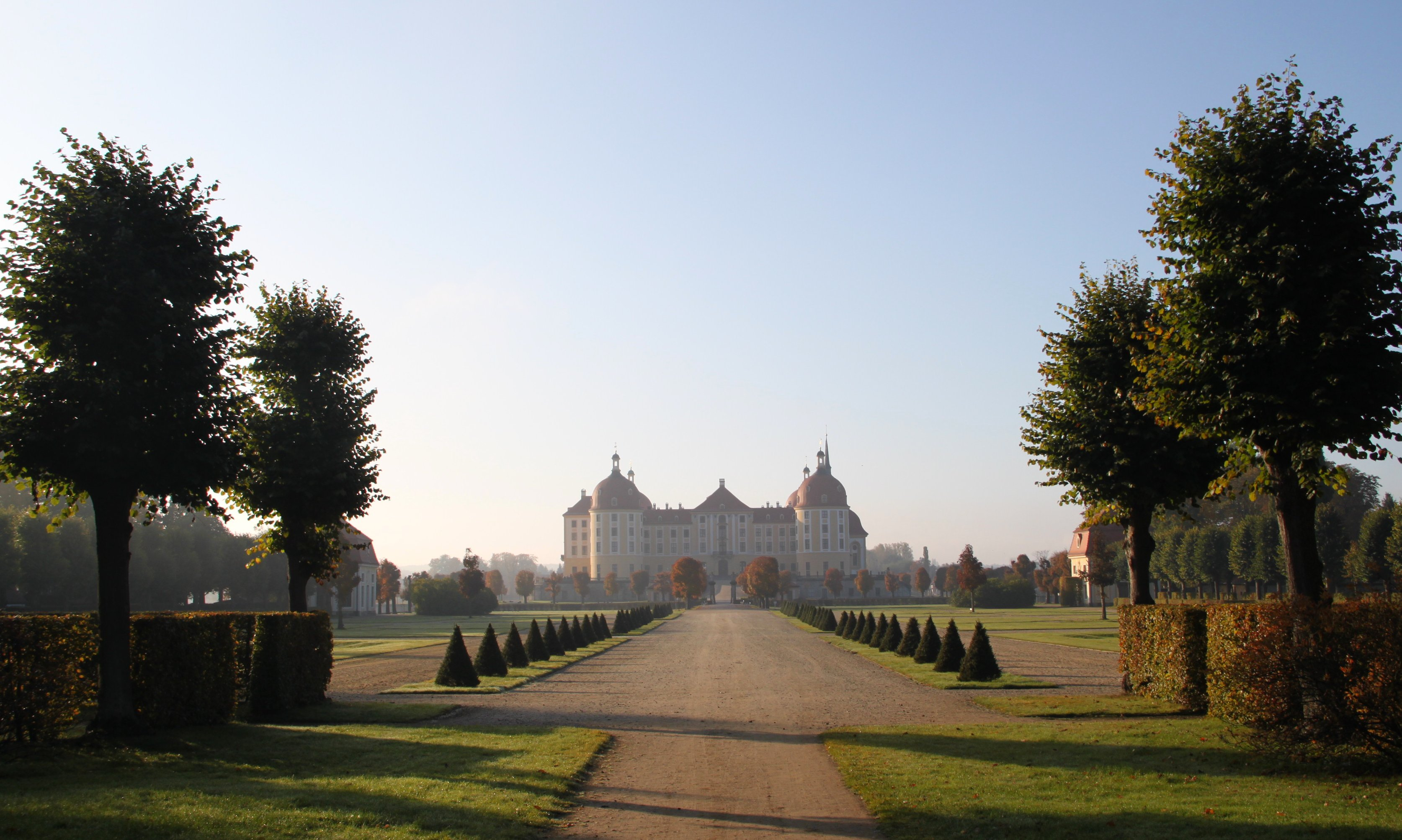
View from the garden to the castle

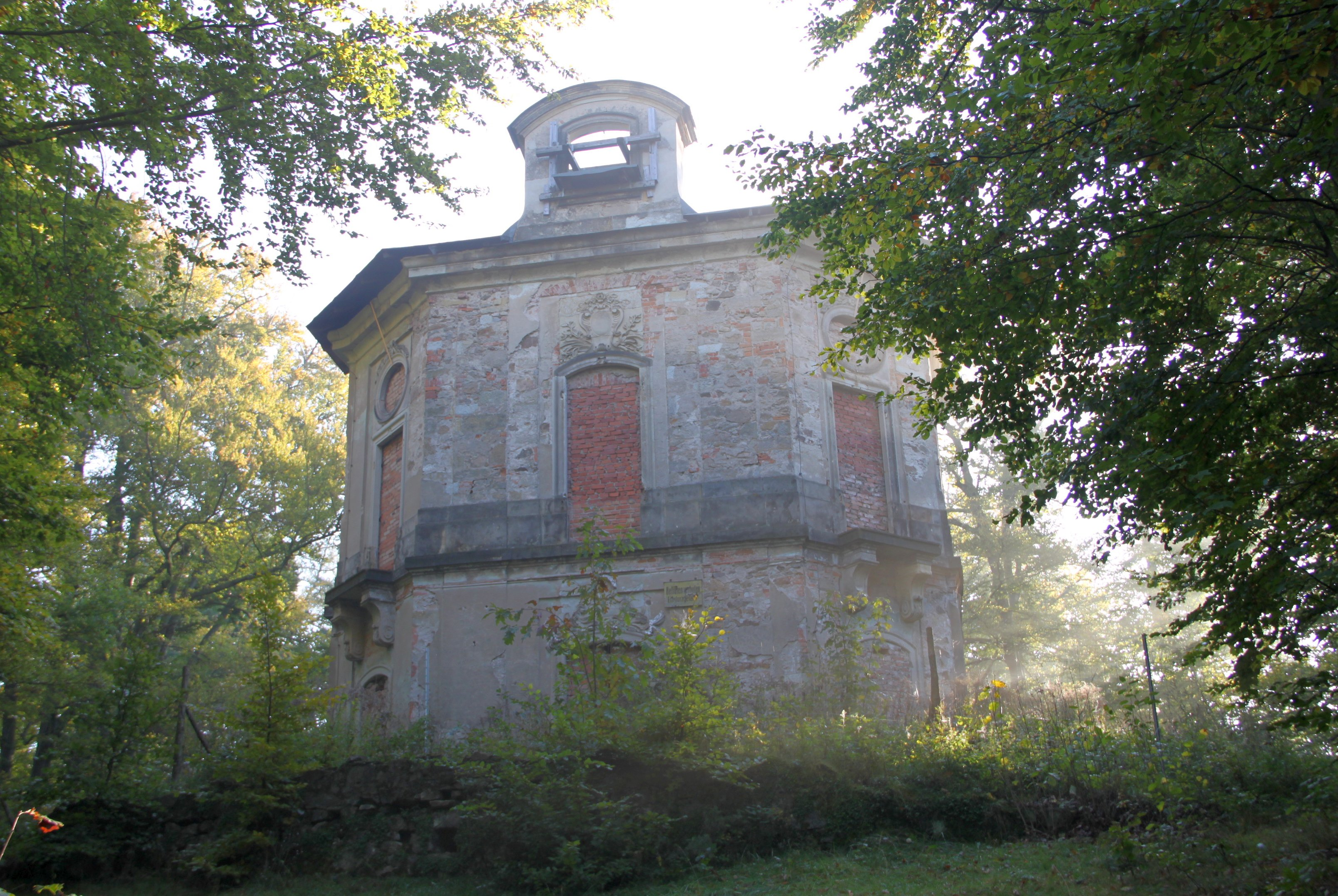
The ruins of the Hellhaus at the intersection of the star-shaped system of alleys

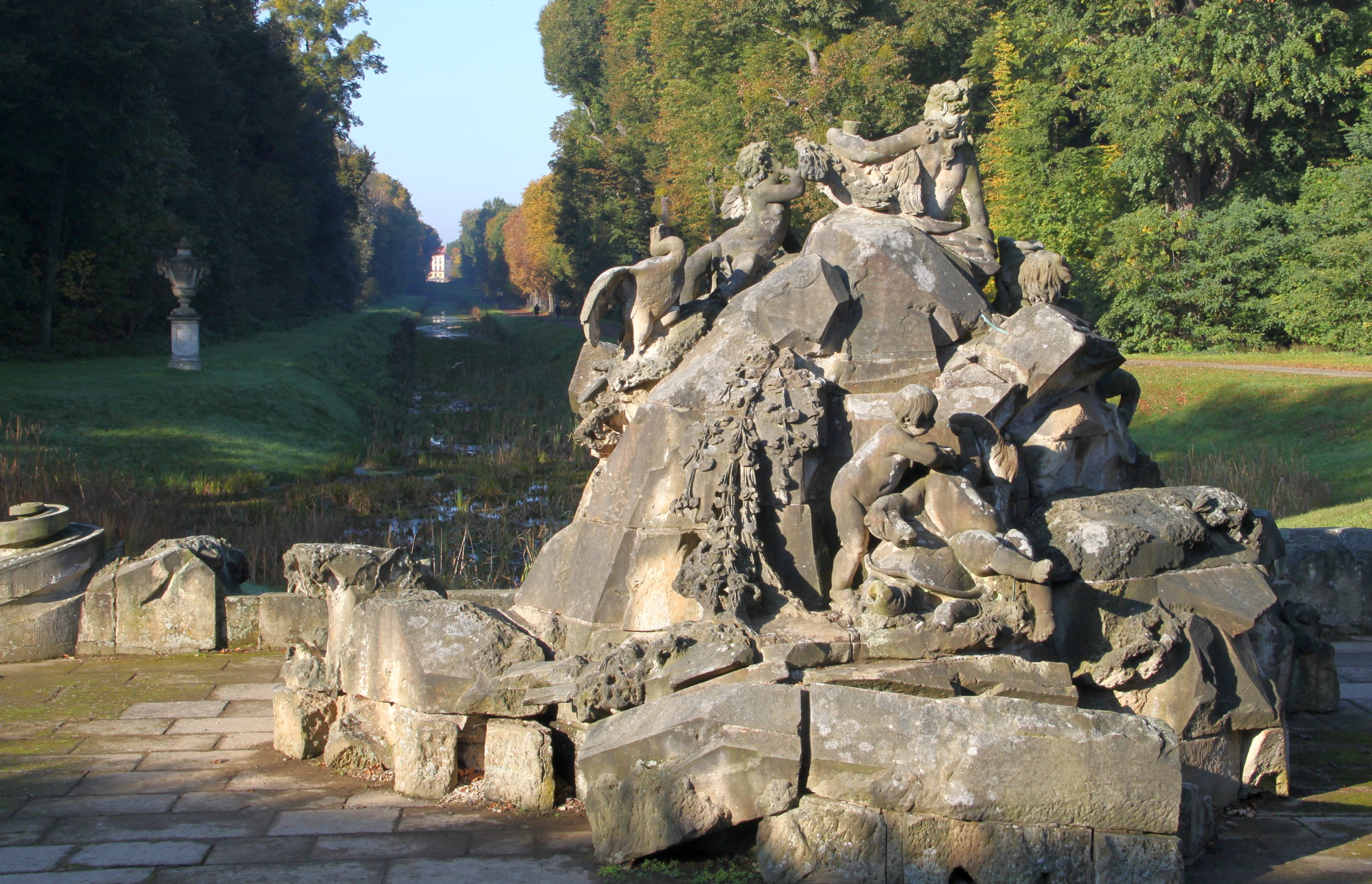
Well of Venus with the alley visually connecting it with the castle

== Little Pheasant Castle ==
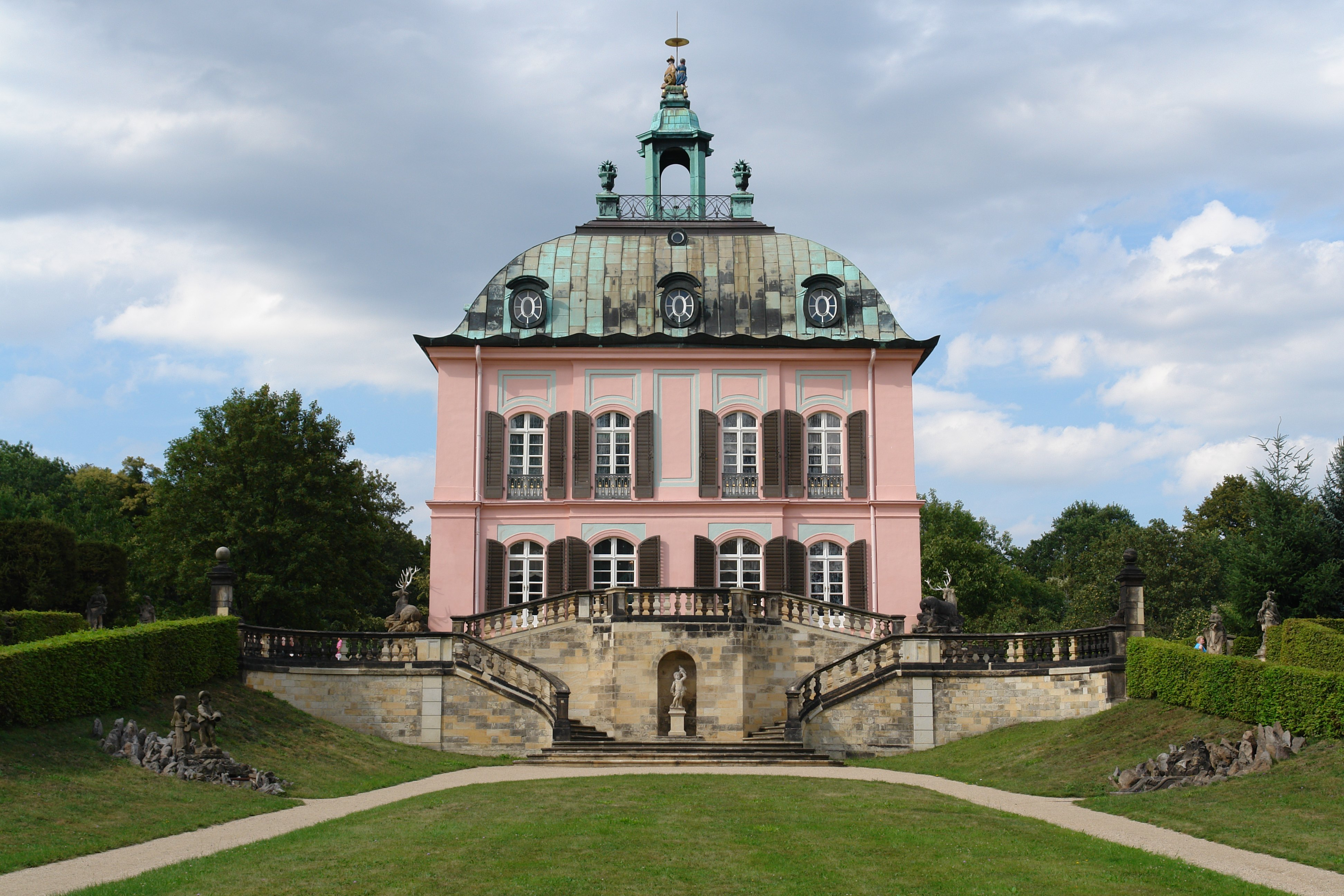
Little Pheasant Castle

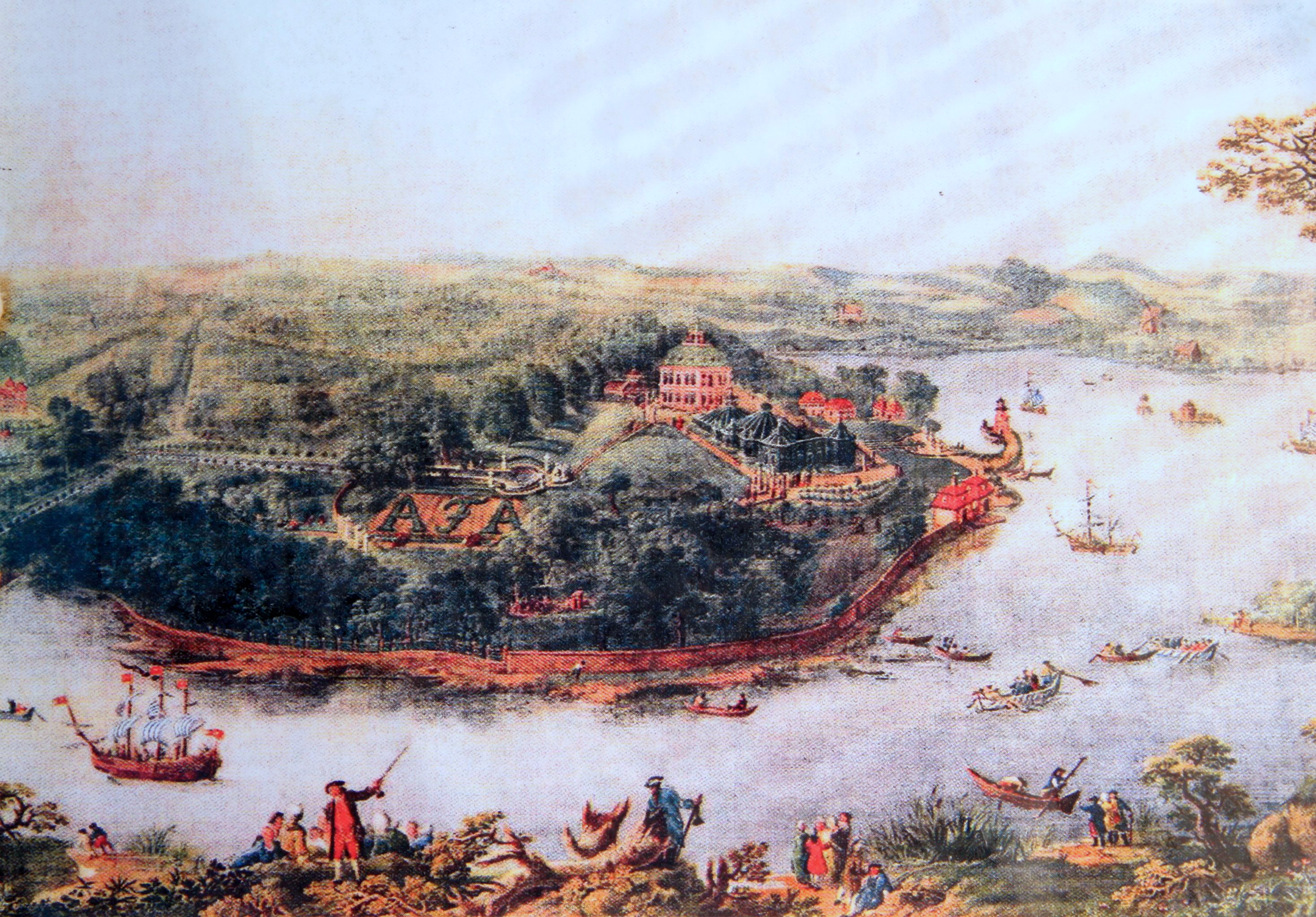
Fasanenschlösschen around 1790 with miniature mock battles at sea

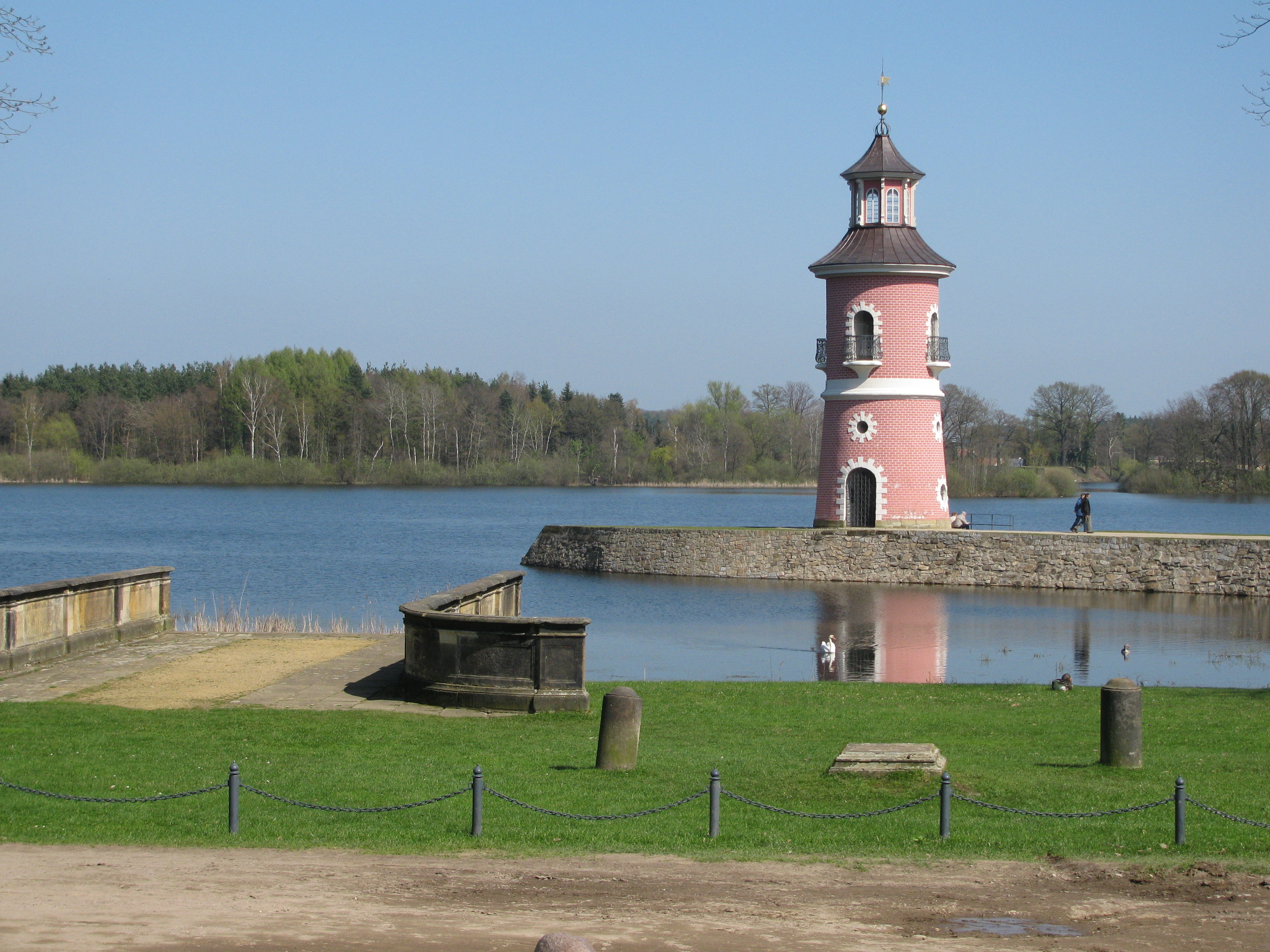
Lighthouse with jetty

Shortly after the remodelling of Moritzburg Castle as the country seat of August the Strong, a single-story pavilion was built just 2.5 kilometres (1.6 miles) away by the architect Johann Christoph Knöffel. The pavilion's foundation was later used for the Chinese-style Little Pheasant Castle (Fasanenschlösschen) in 1770. Elector Frederick Augustus III of Saxony had the pavilion built in the middle of the gardens. Johann Daniel Schade, who had been the architect in charge of the royal building projects, received the commission for the Rococo design. Construction was completed about 1776.

The shell-pink pavilion is located at the end of an alley leading to the main castle. The square building has five bays wide on each side. The high roof has an ogee profile, capped by an open cupola with a pair of Chinese figures under a parasol as a finial. Concealed behind plantings to give the pavilion an isolated ambiance were outbuildings used to breed pheasants for use in hunting.

The few rooms, including the elector's study, are furnished with original trappings. The Rococo finishes include murals on canvas, inlaid wood paneling, painted and gilded stucco ceilings, and unique finishes crafted from materials like embroidered silk, straw, pearls, and feathers. The interiors were restored between 2009 and 2013 through a collaboration between Ostdeutsche Sparkassenstiftung, Sparkasse Meißen, and World Monuments Fund.

On the front of the building, there is a double-flight stairway leading to the lake with a miniature harbour and jetty. There is also a painted brick lighthouse 21.8 metres (72 feet) high. The miniature harbour was used to stage naval battles for the monarch's amusement. In order to re-enact the famous Battle of Chesma, the Dardanelles, a miniature wall representing the original castles at the narrow strait in northwestern Turkey, were also built. Today, the harbour is partly silted because the lake's water level is approximately 1.5 metres (4.9 feet) lower than before.

On the garden side of the castle, a pair of staircases descend to a sunken parterre, now planted with turf.

== See also ==
- List of Baroque residences
- Dresden Castle – Residence of the electors and kings of Saxony
- Pillnitz Castle – Summer residence of the electors and kings of Saxony
- List of castles in Saxony
