= Duke Carl Alexander of Württemberg =

German noble and anti-Nazi monk (1896–1964)

The Reverend Father Odo Wurtemberg O.S.B.
- Born: Duke Carl Alexander Von Württemberg; 12 March 1896; Stuttgart, German Empire
- Died: 27 December 1964 (aged 68); Altshausen, West Germany
- Burial place: Abbey of St. Martin, Weingarten, Württemberg
- Occupation: Benedictine monk
- Parents: Albrecht, Duke of Württemberg (father); Archduchess Margarete Sophie of Austria (mother)
- Relatives: House of Württemberg

Ecclesiastical career
- Religion: Roman Catholicism

Carl Alexander Herzog von Württemberg (later Father Odo) (12 March 1896 – 27 December 1964) was a member of the House of Württemberg who became a Benedictine monk. During the Nazi and post-Nazi era, he provided aid to refugees, Jews, and prisoners of war and was reported to Nazi authorities for these activities. He acted as an informant of the Federal Bureau of Investigation and spied on Wallis Simpson, the lover and later wife of the former British king Edward VIII.

== Life ==
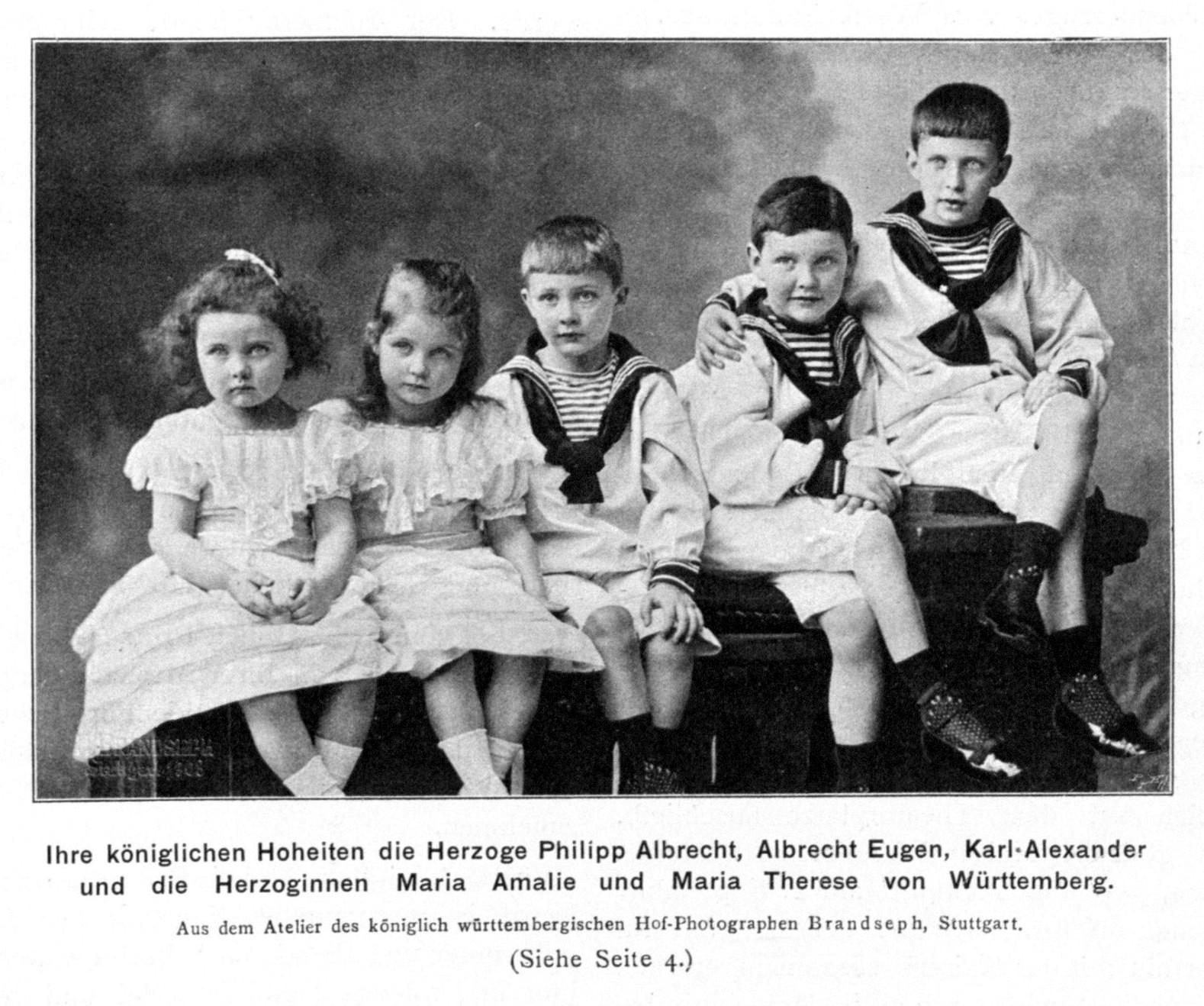
Carl Alexander of Württemberg (in the middle) with his brothers and sisters in 1903

Carl Alexander was the third son of Albrecht, Duke of Württemberg and his wife, Archduchess Margarete Sophie of Austria. He also had four younger sisters. He was taught at home and attended high school after 1914.

Like many members of ruling houses, Duke Carl Alexander nominally entered the army while still a child. On 12 March 1906, the nine-year old Carl Alexander was named a Leutnant in Infanterie-Regiment Alt-Württemberg (3. Württembergisches) Nr. 121 of the Württemberg contingent of the Prussian Army. On 22 August 1914, shortly after the start of World War I, he entered active service in the regiment and saw action on the Western Front and in Italy. He was promoted to Oberleutnant on 24 December 1914. On 6 June 1916, while serving on the staff of the 4th Army, he was promoted to Hauptmann.

Carl Alexander resigned from the army at the rank of Hauptmann (captain) following the German Revolution of 1918–1919, and within a few months became a postulant at the Abbey of St. Martin in Beuron. He entered the novitiate in 1920 as "Brother Odo", taking vows in February 1921. His father succeeded King Wilhelm II, a distant cousin, as head of the House of Württemberg in October of that same year. Brother Odo was ordained a priest in 1926. In the summer of 1930, Father Odo was sent to the Abbey of St. Martin, in Weingarten, not far from Castle Altshausen. He held several offices in the monastery and was active with different Catholic youth organizations. Because of his position and his family's conservative Catholic values, he was involved in opposition to National Socialism as early as 1933 and was interrogated by the Gestapo several times.

He left the abbey and traveled to Württemberg in 1934. The Nazis expelled Father Odo from Germany in 1936, and he took refuge in monasteries in Switzerland and Italy. In Switzerland, he founded International Catholic Refugees aid and traveled through Europe.

== Emigration to the United States ==
In 1940, after the Swiss government informed him that they could not guarantee his safety, Father Odo decided to emigrate to the United States. Before leaving, he destroyed his personal papers, so his activities could not be traced in detail. From 1941 Father Odo lived in Washington, D.C., continuing his work with refugees and enabling Jews to emigrate from Germany and its conquered territories. From 1943 onward, he was involved in the pastoral care of Germans in American prisoner of war camps. He told the Federal Bureau of Investigation that the Duchess of Windsor had been sleeping with Joachim von Ribbentrop when he was the German ambassador in London (1936–1938).

The historian and archivist of the House of Württemberg, Eberhard Fritz, believes that Claus von Stauffenberg's opposition to Adolf Hitler may have been partly motivated by his relationship with the House of Württemberg (Stauffenberg's father was the last Oberhofmarschall of the Kingdom of Württemberg). Stauffenberg was personally acquainted with Father Odo and was well aware of pockets of resistance against the Nazis.

After the end of World War II, Father Odo founded the Central European Rehabilitation Association (CERA), with the aim of providing war-torn Central Europe with food, clothing, medicine, and other necessities. In 1949, after CERA had fulfilled its function and was dissolved, Father Odo returned to the Abbey of St. Bartholomew in Germany. He left the monastery in 1952 because of a heart condition, returning to his family castle in Altshausen. There he spent the last years of his life and was a refounder of the Yellow Hussars of Altshausen.

Father Odo was briefly interviewed and mentioned in the 1959 biography of his aunt Queen Mary of Teck by the British biographer James Pope-Hennessy.

According to his wishes, Father Odo was buried in the cemetery of the Abbey of St. Martin at Weingarten, Württemberg.

== Ancestry ==
Ancestors of Duke Carl Alexander of Württemberg

8. Duke Alexander of Württemberg
4. Duke Philipp of Württemberg
9. Princess Marie of Orléans
2. Albrecht, Duke of Württemberg
10. Archduke Albert, Duke of Teschen
5. Archduchess Maria Theresa of Austria
11. Princess Hildegard of Bavaria
1. Carl Alexander, Duke of Württemberg (Father Odo)
12 Franz Karl Josef of Austria
6. Karl Ludwig of Austria
13 Sophie Friederike of Bavaria
3. Archduchess Margarete Sophie of Austria
14 Ferdinand II of the Two Sicilies
7. Maria Annunciata of Bourbon-Sicily
15 Maria Theresa of Austria

== Decorations and awards ==
- Kingdom of Württemberg:
  - Order of the Württemberg Crown, Grand Cross
  - Friedrich Order
    - Grand Cross
    - Knight's Cross 1st Class with Swords (20 February 1918)
  - Golden Military Merit Medal (1 November 1914)
  - Military Merit Order, Knight's Cross, in lieu of the previously awarded Golden Military Merit Medal (21 May 1915)
  - Wilhelm Cross with Swords and Crown (5 October 1916)
- Kingdom of Prussia:
  - Iron Cross, 2nd Class
  - Iron Cross, 1st Class
- Kingdom of Bavaria: Military Merit Order, 4th Class with Swords
- Free and Hanseatic City of Hamburg: Hanseatic Cross
- Grand Duchy of Hesse: General Honor Decoration for Bravery
- Free and Hanseatic City of Lübeck: Hanseatic Cross
- Kingdom of Saxony: Albert Order, Knight 2nd Class with Swords
- Duchy of Saxe-Meiningen: Cross for Merit in War
- Austria-Hungary:
  - Order of Saint Stephen of Hungary, Grand Cross
  - Military Merit Cross, 3rd Class with War Decoration
- Ottoman Empire:
  - Liakat Medal in Gold with Sabers
  - War Medal
