= Duke Robert of Württemberg =

German duke (1873–1947)

- Robert in 1907
- Born: 14 January 1873; Meran, Austria-Hungary
- Died: 12 April 1947 (aged 74); Schloss Altshausen, Altshausen, Baden-Württemberg, Germany
- Spouse: Archduchess Maria Immakulata of Austria (m. 1900)
Names
- German: Robert Maria Klemens Philipp Joseph
- House: House of Württemberg
- Father: Duke Philipp of Württemberg
- Mother: Archduchess Maria Theresa of Austria

Duke Robert Maria Klemens Philipp Joseph of Württemberg (German: Robert Maria Klemens Philipp Joseph, Herzog von Württemberg; 14 January 1873 in Meran, Austria-Hungary – 12 April 1947 in Schloss Altshausen, Altshausen, Baden-Württemberg, Germany) was a member of the House of Württemberg and a Duke of Württemberg.

== Family ==
Robert was the fourth child of Duke Philipp of Württemberg and his wife Archduchess Maria Theresa of Austria. He was the younger brother of Generalfeldmarschall Albrecht, Duke of Württemberg. Robert belonged to the fifth branch (called the ducal branch) of the House of Württemberg, descended from the seventh son of Frederick II Eugene, Duke of Württemberg. On the extinction of the eldest branch in 1921 with the death of the former King William II of Württemberg, the ducal branch became the new dynastic branch of the House.

== Marriage ==
Robert married Archduchess Maria Immakulata of Austria, seventh child and fifth eldest daughter of Archduke Karl Salvator of Austria and Princess Maria Immaculata of Bourbon-Two Sicilies, on 29 October 1900 in Vienna. They had no children.

== Military career ==
Robert served as a cavalry officer in the Württemberg contingent of the Prussian Army. From 27 January 1907 to 21 September 1912, he was commander of the 2nd Württemberg Dragoon Regiment No. 26. He was then commander of the 26th Cavalry Brigade from 21 September 1912 until 30 July 1916. During World War I, he led his brigade as part of the 7th Cavalry Division. On 19 September 1916, he was promoted to Generalleutnant.

=== Ranks ===
- 1891 : Sekondelieutenant (= Leutnant)
- 1896 : Premierlieutenant (= Oberleutnant)
- 1900 : Rittmeister
- 1904 : Major
- 1907 : Oberstleutnant
- 1909 : Oberst
- 1913 : Generalmajor
- 1916 : Generalleutnant

== Honors and awards ==
=== Honorary titles and positions ===
- à la suite to the 2nd Württemberg Dragoon Regiment No. 26 (Dragoner-Regiment König (2. Württembergisches) Nr. 26) (11 October 1891)
- à la suite to the 2nd Pomeranian Uhlan Regiment No. 9 (2. Pommersches Ulanen-Regiment Nr. 9) (7 September 1900)
- à la suite to the Austro-Hungarian 9th Dragoon Regiment (k.u.k. Dragoner Regiment „Erzherzog Albrecht“ Nr. 9)
- Title of k.u.k. Feldmarschalleutnant

=== Decorations and awards ===
- Kingdom of Württemberg:
  - Order of the Württemberg Crown
    - Grand Cross (1887)
    - Swords to the Grand Cross (20 July 1916)
  - Friedrich Order
    - Grand Cross
    - Swords to the Grand Cross (20 July 1916)
  - Military Merit Order, Knight's Cross (1914)
  - Wilhelm Cross with Swords and Crown (5 October 1916)
  - Officer's Service Decoration 1st Class (3 December 1915)
  - Jubilee Medal in Gold
  - 1911 Royal Wedding Medal
- Grand Duchy of Baden: House Order of Fidelity, Knight
- Kingdom of Bavaria:
  - Order of St. Hubert, Knight (1903)
  - Military Merit Order
    - 2nd Class with Swords (13 November 1914)
    - Star with Swords to the 2nd Class with Swords (11 June 1917)
- Duchy of Brunswick: War Merit Cross, 2nd Class
- Free and Hanseatic City of Hamburg: Hanseatic Cross
- Princely House Order of Hohenzollern, Cross of Honor 1st Class

Principality of Lippe: House Order of the Honor Cross, 1st Class

- Grand Duchy of Mecklenburg-Strelitz: House Order of the Wendish Crown, Grand Cross with Crown in Ore (18 February 1906)
- Kingdom of Prussia:
  - Order of the Black Eagle, Knight 25.02.1907
  - Iron Cross, 1st and 2nd Class
- Kingdom of Saxony: Order of the Rue Crown, Knight (1897)
- Grand Duchy of Saxe-Weimar-Eisenach: Order of the White Falcon, Grand Cross
- Principality of Schaumburg-Lippe: House Order of the Cross of Honor, 1st Class
- Austria-Hungary:
  - Order of the Golden Fleece (1900)
  - Order of Saint Stephen of Hungary, Grand Cross
  - Military Merit Cross, 2nd Class with War Decoration
  - 1908 Jubilee Cross
- Ottoman Empire:
  - Imtiaz Medal in Gold
  - Imtiaz Medal in Silver
  - War Medal
- Tuscany: Order of Saint Joseph, Grand Cross

== Ancestry ==
Ancestors of Duke Robert of Württemberg

8. Duke Alexander of Württemberg
4. Duke Alexander of Württemberg
9. Princess Antoinette of Saxe-Coburg-Saalfeld
2. Duke Philipp of Württemberg
10. Louis-Philippe I, King of the French
5. Princess Marie of Orléans
11. Maria Amalia of the Two Sicilies
1. Duke Robert of Württemberg
12. Archduke Charles, Duke of Teschen
6. Archduke Albert, Duke of Teschen
13. Princess Henrietta of Nassau-Weilburg
3. Archduchess Maria Theresa of Austria
14. Ludwig I of Bavaria
7. Princess Hildegard of Bavaria
15. Therese of Saxe-Hildburghausen
