= Albrecht, Duke of Württemberg =

Last Crown Prince of Württemberg (1865–1939)

Albrecht
- Duke of Württemberg
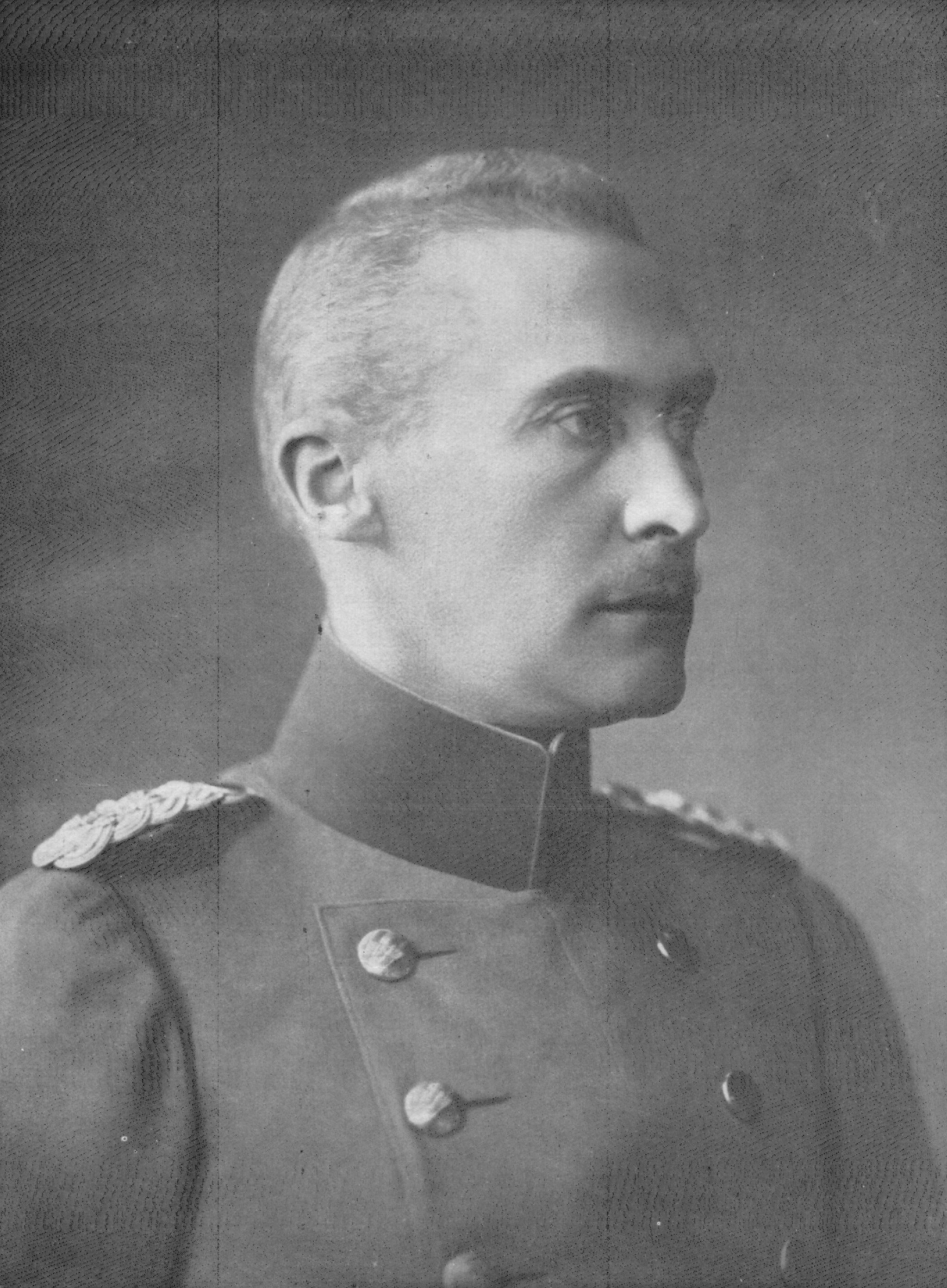
- Duke Albrecht c. 1915

Head of the House of Württemberg
- Tenure: 2 October 1921 - 31 October 1939
- Predecessor: King Wilhelm II
- Successor: Duke Philipp Albrecht
- Born: 23 December 1865; Vienna, Empire of Austria
- Died: 31 October 1939 (aged 73); Altshausen, State of Württemberg, Nazi Germany
- Spouse: Archduchess Margarete Sophie of Austria (m. 1893; died 1902)
- Issue: See: Philipp Albrecht, Duke of Württemberg; Duke Albrecht Eugen; Duke Carl Alexander; Duchess Maria Amalie; Duchess Maria Theresa; Duchess Maria Elisabeth; Duchess Maria Margarete
Names
- Albrecht Maria Alexander Philipp Joseph
- House: Württemberg
- Father: Duke Philipp of Württemberg
- Mother: Archduchess Maria Theresa of Austria
- Religion: Roman Catholic
- Military career
- Allegiance: German Empire: Kingdom of Württemberg
- Branch: Imperial German Army: Army of Württemberg
- Service years: 1885–1919
- Rank: General field marshal
- Commands: German 4th Army (1914–1917); Army Group Albrecht (1917–1918)
- Battles: First World War: Battle of the Ardennes; Battle of the Yser; Meuse–Argonne offensive; Second Battle of Ypres; Battle of Hill 60

Duke Albrecht of Württemberg (Albrecht Maria Alexander Philipp Joseph; 23 December 1865 – 31 October 1939) was the last crown prince of Württemberg, a German military commander of World War I, and the head of the House of Württemberg from 1921 to his death.

== Early life ==
Duke Albrecht was born in Vienna as the eldest child of Duke Philipp of Württemberg and his wife Archduchess Maria Theresa of Austria, daughter of Archduke Albert, Duke of Teschen.

Albrecht entered the armies of the Kingdom of Württemberg and the German Empire in 1883, rose quickly through its ranks, and became the heir apparent to the throne of Württemberg.

In 1910, Albrecht attended the funeral of Edward VII. He was a third cousin of Mary of Teck, who was the Queen consort of George V.

== World War I ==
When World War I began, Duke Albrecht's command, the Six Army Inspectorate (Sechste Armee-Inspektion), was formed into the 4th Army, 123 battalions strong. As King William II had no sons, Albrecht was appointed the army's commander and assigned to the Ardennes, with Walther von Lüttwitz serving as his chief of staff. This army he led to victory alongside Crown Prince Wilhelm's 5th Army at the Battle of the Ardennes in August 1914. Following that victory, the 4th Army saw action in the First Battle of the Marne before during the Race to the Sea being transferred to Flanders in October, where Albrecht commanded them during the Battle of the Yser and the First Battle of Ypres. Albrecht also commanded the German forces during the Second Battle of Ypres, where poison gas was used on a large scale for the first time.

Albrecht was awarded the Pour le Mérite in August 1915 and promoted to Generalfeldmarschall in August 1916. The new Army Group Duke Albrecht was placed under his command in February 1917, and he was responsible for the southern sector of the Western Front until the Armistice.

== Postwar ==
Albrecht had become heir presumptive to the Kingdom of Württemberg following the death of his father in October 1917, but the German Empire's World War I defeat and the abdication of his cousin King Willhelm II of Württemberg following the German Revolution prevented him from ever succeeding to the throne. He became head of the House of Württemberg after the death of Wilhelm on 2 October 1921.

Albrecht died at Altshausen Castle. His son Duke Philipp Albrecht succeeded him as head of the House of Württemberg.

== Family ==
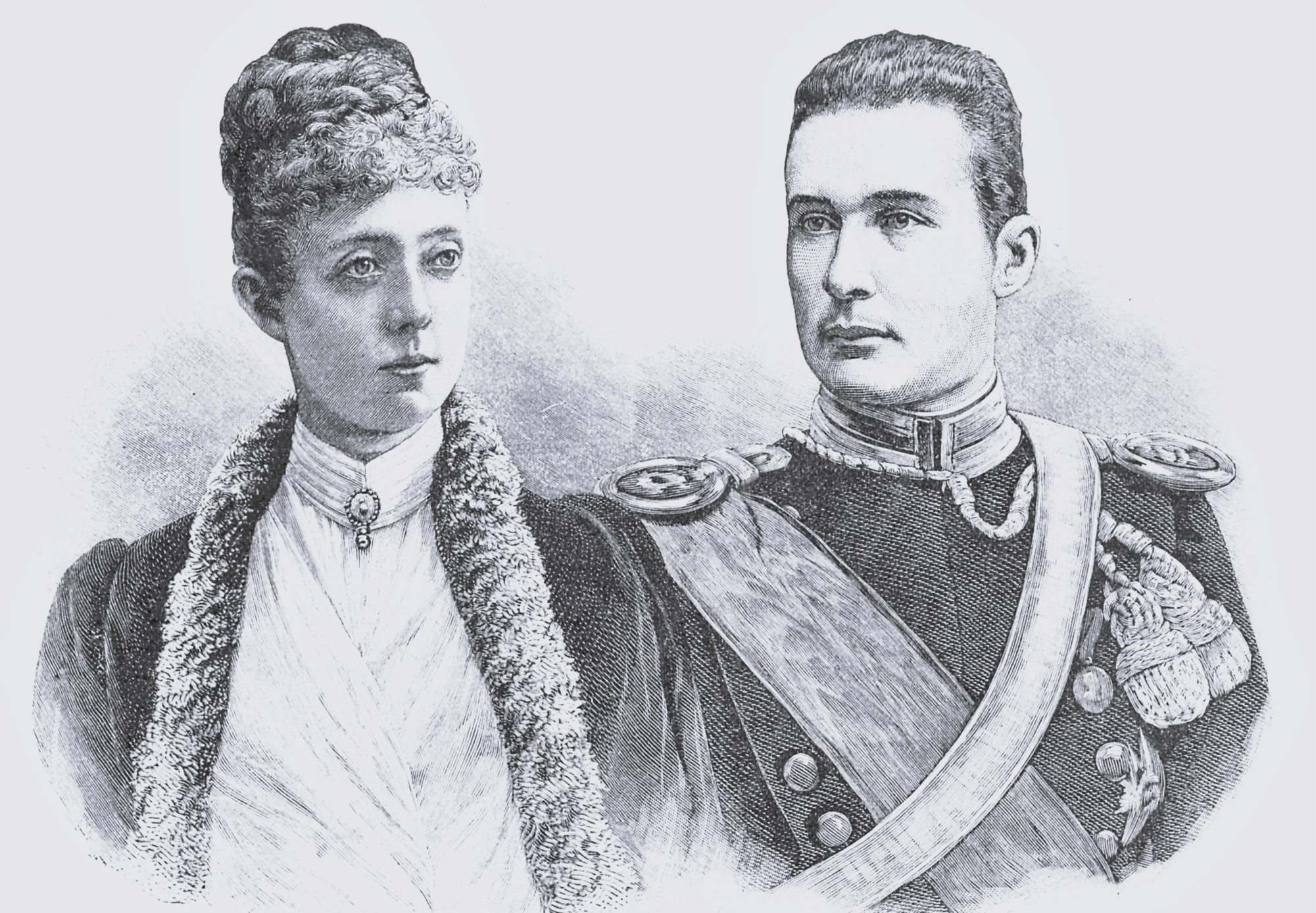
Albrecht and Margarete Sophie in 1893

Albrecht was married in Vienna on 24 January 1893 to Archduchess Margarete Sophie of Austria, daughter of Archduke Carl Ludwig. They had seven children:

- Philipp Albrecht, Duke of Württemberg (born 14 November 1893; died 15 April 1975).
- Duke Albrecht Eugen of Württemberg (born 8 January 1895 in Stuttgart; died 24 June 1954 in Schwäbisch Gmünd), who married Princess Nadezhda of Bulgaria (1899–1958), daughter of Tsar Ferdinand I. They had five children.
- Duke Carl Alexander of Württemberg (born 12 March 1896 in Stuttgart; died 27 December 1964 in Altshausen), a Benedictine monk known as "Father Odo".
- Duchess Maria Amalia of Württemberg (born 15 August 1897 in Gmunden; died 13 August 1923 in Altshausen), briefly engaged to Crown Prince George of Saxony.
- Duchess Maria Theresa of Württemberg (born 16 August 1898 in Stuttgart; died 26 March 1928 in Eibingen).
- Duchess Maria Elisabeth of Württemberg (born 12 September 1899 in Potsdam; died 15 April 1900 in Meran).
- Duchess Margarita Maria of Württemberg (born 4 January 1902 in Stuttgart; died 22 April 1945 in Altshausen).

== Decorations and awards ==
=== German States ===
- Kingdom of Württemberg:
  - Order of the Württemberg Crown
    - Grand Cross (1879)
    - Swords to the Grand Cross (18 February 1916)
  - Friedrich Order
    - Grand Cross
    - Swords to the Grand Cross (18 February 1916)
  - Military Merit Order, Grand Cross (1 November 1914)
  - Wilhelm Cross with Swords and Crown (5 October 1916)
  - Service Decoration 1st Class
  - Jubilee Medal in Gold
- Grand Duchy of Baden:
  - House Order of Fidelity (1904)
  - Military Karl-Friedrich Merit Order, Grand Cross
- Kingdom of Bavaria:
  - Order of St. Hubert, Knight (1886)
  - Military Order of Max Joseph, Grand Cross (10 October 1915)
  - Prince Regent Luitpold Medal on the Ribbon of the Jubilee Medal for the Bavarian Army
- (Bremen (state)) Free and Hanseatic City of Bremen: Hanseatic Cross
- Duchy of Brunswick: War Merit Cross, 2nd Class
- Free and Hanseatic City of Hamburg: Hanseatic Cross
- Grand Duchy of Hesse:
  - Ludewig Order, Grand Cross (7 September 1899)
  - General Honor Decoration for Bravery
- :
  - Princely House Order of Hohenzollern
    - Cross of Honor 1st Class
    - Swords to the Cross of Honor 1st Class (21 August 1917)
- Principality of Lippe: House Order of the Cross of Honor, 1st Class
- Free and Hanseatic City of Lübeck: Hanseatic Cross
- Grand Duchy of Mecklenburg-Schwerin:
  - House Order of the Wendish Crown, Grand Cross with Crown in Ore
  - Military Merit Cross, 1st and 2nd Class
- Grand Duchy of Oldenburg: House and Merit Order of Peter Frederick Louis, Grand Cross with Golden Crown and Collar
- Kingdom of Prussia:
  - Order of the Black Eagle, 20 January 1899 Knight; with Collar (18 January 1900)
  - Order of the Red Eagle: Grand Cross (18 January 1900)
  - Royal House Order of Hohenzollern, Grand Commander's Cross
  - Order Pour le Mérite (22 August 1915)
  - Oakleaves to the Order Pour le Mérite (25 February 1918)
  - Iron Cross, 1st and 2nd Class
- Principality of Reuß jüngere Linie: Princely Reuss Honor Cross, 1st Class
- Kingdom of Saxony:
  - Order of the Rue Crown, Knight (1894)
  - Military Order of St. Henry
    - Knight's Cross (9 June 1915)
    - Commander's Cross 2nd Class (21 March 1916)
- Grand Duchy of Saxe-Weimar-Eisenach: Order of the White Falcon, Grand Cross
- (Duchy of Saxe-Altenburg) (Saxe-Coburg and Gotha) (Saxe-Meiningen) Saxon Duchies: Ducal Saxe-Ernestine House Order, Grand Cross
- Duchy of Saxe-Meiningen: Cross for Merit in War
- Principality of Schaumburg-Lippe: House Order of the Cross of Honor, 1st Class
- Principality of Schwarzburg-Sondershausen: Princely Schwarzburg Honor Cross, 1st Class with Crown
- Principality of Waldeck: Princely Waldeck Merit Cross, 1st Class

=== Foreign States ===
- Austria-Hungary:
  - Order of the Golden Fleece (1893)
  - Order of Saint Stephen of Hungary, Grand Cross (1891)
  - Military Merit Cross, 1st Class with War Decoration
  - Golden Military Merit Medal on the ribbon of the Military Merit Cross
  - Military Jubilee Medal
- United Kingdom:
  - Royal Victorian Order, Honorary Knight Grand Cross (14 August 1907)
  - Queen Victoria Diamond Jubilee Medal
- House of Nassau: House Order of the Golden Lion
- Principality of Monaco: Order of Saint Charles, Grand Cross (12 February 1889)
- Ottoman Empire:
  - Order of Glory with Diamonds and Sabers
  - Imtiaz Medal in Gold
  - Imtiaz Medal in Silver
  - War Medal
- Empire of Persia: Order of the Lion and the Sun, Grand Cross
- Russian Empire: Order of St. Andrew

== Ancestry ==
Ancestors of Albrecht, Duke of Württemberg

8. Duke Alexander of Württemberg
4. Duke Alexander of Württemberg
9. Princess Antoinette of Saxe-Coburg-Saalfeld
2. Duke Philipp of Württemberg
10. Louis Philippe I of France
5. Princess Marie of Orléans
11. Princess Maria Amalia of Naples and Sicily
1. Albrecht, Duke of Württemberg
12. Archduke Charles, Duke of Teschen
6. Archduke Albrecht, Duke of Teschen
13. Princess Henrietta of Nassau-Weilburg
3. Archduchess Maria Theresa of Austria
14. Ludwig I of Bavaria
7. Princess Hildegard of Bavaria
15. Princess Therese of Saxe-Hildburghausen

== Notes ==
Albrecht, Duke of Württemberg House of Württemberg Born: 23 December 1865 Died: 31 October 1939
Titles in pretence
Preceded by Wilhelm II	— TITULAR — King of Württemberg; 2 October 1921 – 31 October 1939; Reason for succession failure: Kingdom abolished in 1918	Succeeded by Duke Philipp Albrecht
Military offices
Preceded by Formed from VI Army Inspectorate (VI. Armee-Inspektion)	Commander, 4th Army; 2 August 1914 – 25 February 1917	Succeeded by General der Infanterie Friedrich Sixt von Armin
