= Archduchess Maria Theresa of Austria (1845–1927) =

Austrian aristocrat

Archduchess Maria Theresia of Austria
- Duchess Philipp of Württemberg
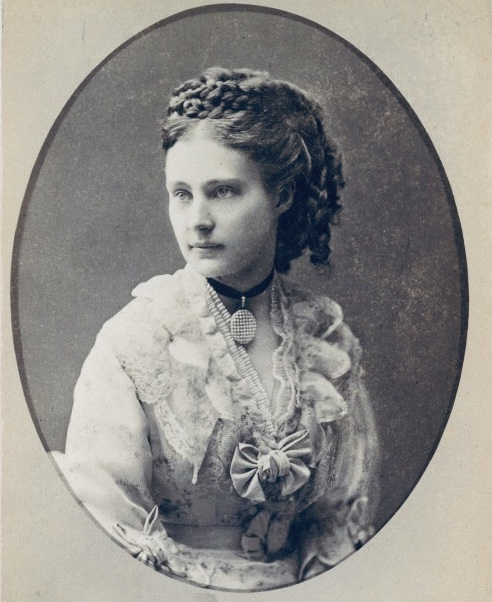
- Maria Theresia c. 1870
- Born: 15 July 1845; Vienna, Austria
- Died: 8 October 1927 (aged 82); Tübingen, Germany
- Burial: Altshausen, Germany
- Spouse: Duke Philipp of Württemberg (m. 1865; died 1917)
- Issue: Albrecht, Duke of Württemberg; Duchess Marie Amélie; Maria Isabella, Princess of Saxony; Duke Robert; Duke Ulrich
Names
- Maria Theresia Anna
- Father: Archduke Albert, Duke of Teschen
- Mother: Princess Hildegard of Bavaria

Archduchess Maria Theresia of Austria (15 July 1845 – 8 October 1927) known as Maria Theresa, was a member of the Teschen branch of the House of Habsburg-Lorraine by birth. Through her marriage to Duke Philipp of Württemberg, she became a duchess of the House of Württemberg.

== Early life ==
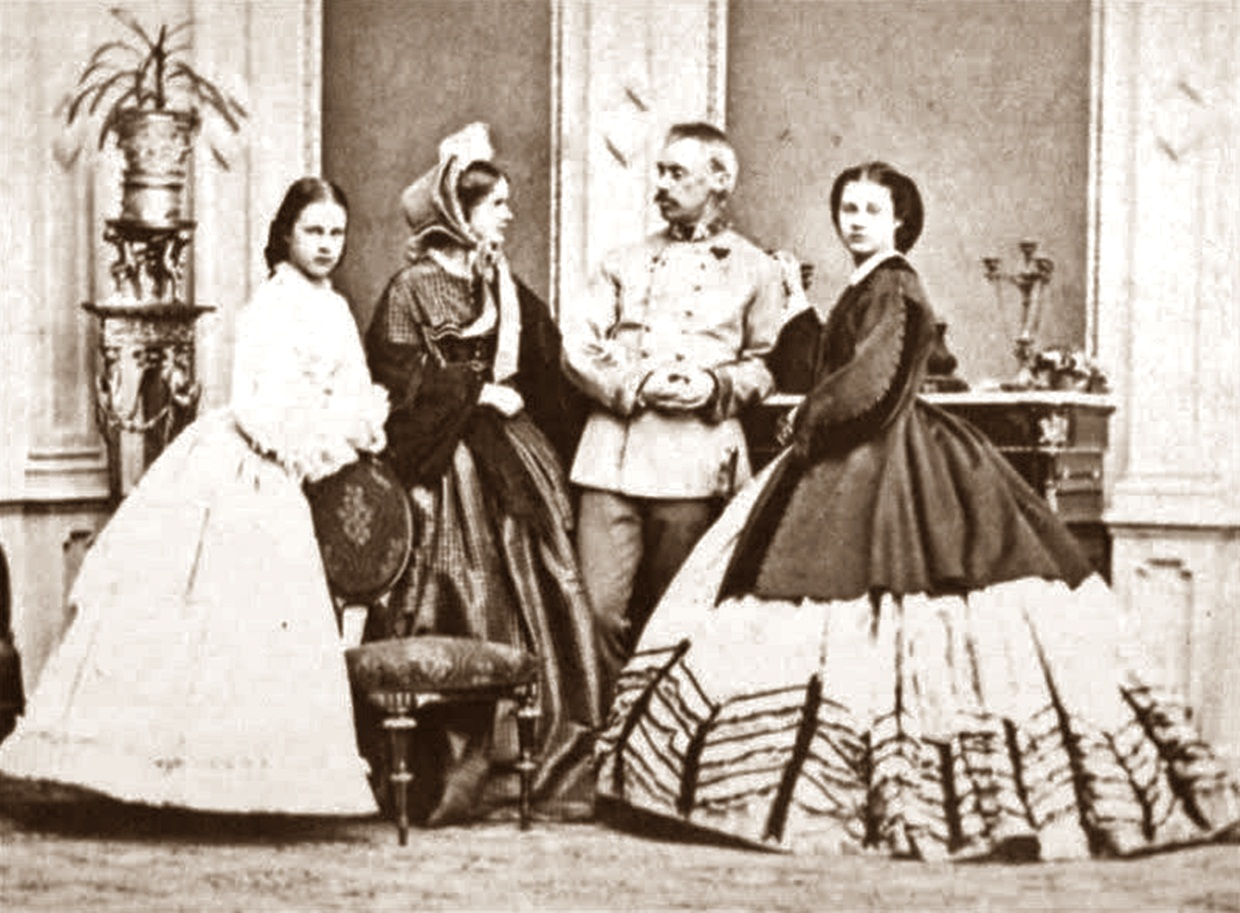
Maria Theresia with her parents and sister Mathilde

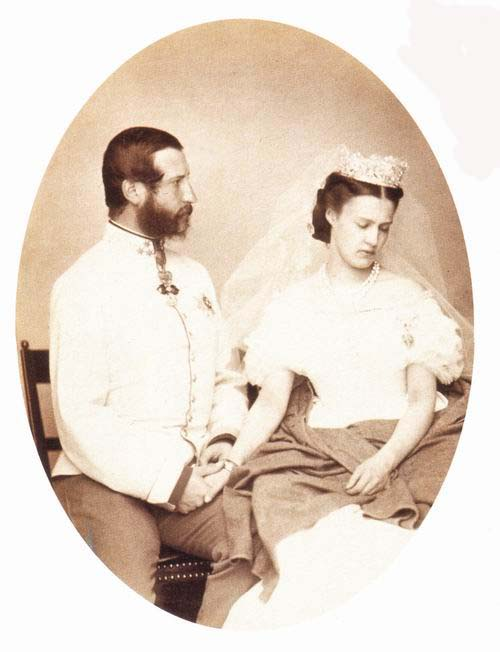
Archduchess Maria Theresia with her husband on their wedding day

Maria Theresia was born on 15 July 1845 in Vienna, the eldest daughter of Archduke Albrecht, Duke of Teschen, a field marshal in the Austrian army, and Princess Hildegard of Bavaria. Following her mother's death in 1864, she assumed domestic and ceremonial duties within her father's household, assisting in regional diplomatic affairs. Through inheritance and family networks, her personal estate included rare historical jewelry pieces connected to the imperial collections of Empress Elisabeth of Austria, which remained documented among her private assets during her tenure at the Viennese court.

== Marriage and issue ==
On 18 January 1865, Maria Theresia married Duke Philipp of Württemberg in Vienna. The marriage produced five children:

- Albrecht, Duke of Württemberg (1865–1939), married Archduchess Margarete Sophie of Austria in 1893 and had issue.
- Duchess Marie Amélie of Württemberg (1865–1883).
- Duchess Maria Isabella of Württemberg (1871–1904), married Prince Johann Georg of Saxony in 1894 and without issue.
- Duke Robert of Württemberg (1873–1947), married Archduchess Maria Immakulata of Austria in 1900 and without issue.
- Duke Ulrich of Württemberg (1877–1944).

Maria Theresia died on 8 October 1927 at the age of 82 in Tübingen, Germany. She was interred in the royal crypt within the palace grounds at Schloss Altshausen.

== Court life and dynastic role ==
In 1867, following their marriage, Maria Theresia and her husband commissioned the construction of a grand Neo-Renaissance residential palace in Vienna, designed by the architect Arnold Zenetti. Known as the Palais Württemberg, the palace served as their urban residence until 1871, when the property was sold and subsequently converted into the Hotel Imperial ahead of the 1873 Vienna World's Fair.

== Ancestry ==
Ancestors of Archduchess Maria Theresa of Austria (1845–1927)

8. Leopold II, Holy Roman Emperor
4. Archduke Charles, Duke of Teschen
9. Infanta Maria Louisa of Spain
2. Archduke Albrecht, Duke of Teschen
10. Frederick William, Prince of Nassau-Weilburg
5. Princess Henrietta of Nassau-Weilburg
11. Burgravine Louise Isabelle of Kirchberg
1. Archduchess Maria Theresia of Austria
12. Maximilian I Joseph of Bavaria
6. Ludwig I of Bavaria
13. Princess Augusta Wilhelmine of Hesse-Darmstadt
3. Princess Hildegard of Bavaria
14. Frederick, Duke of Saxe-Altenburg
7. Princess Therese of Saxe-Hildburghausen
15. Duchess Charlotte Georgine of Mecklenburg-Strelitz
