= Archduke Albrecht, Duke of Teschen =

Austrian noble and Austro-Hungarian military officer (1817–1895)

Archduke Albrecht
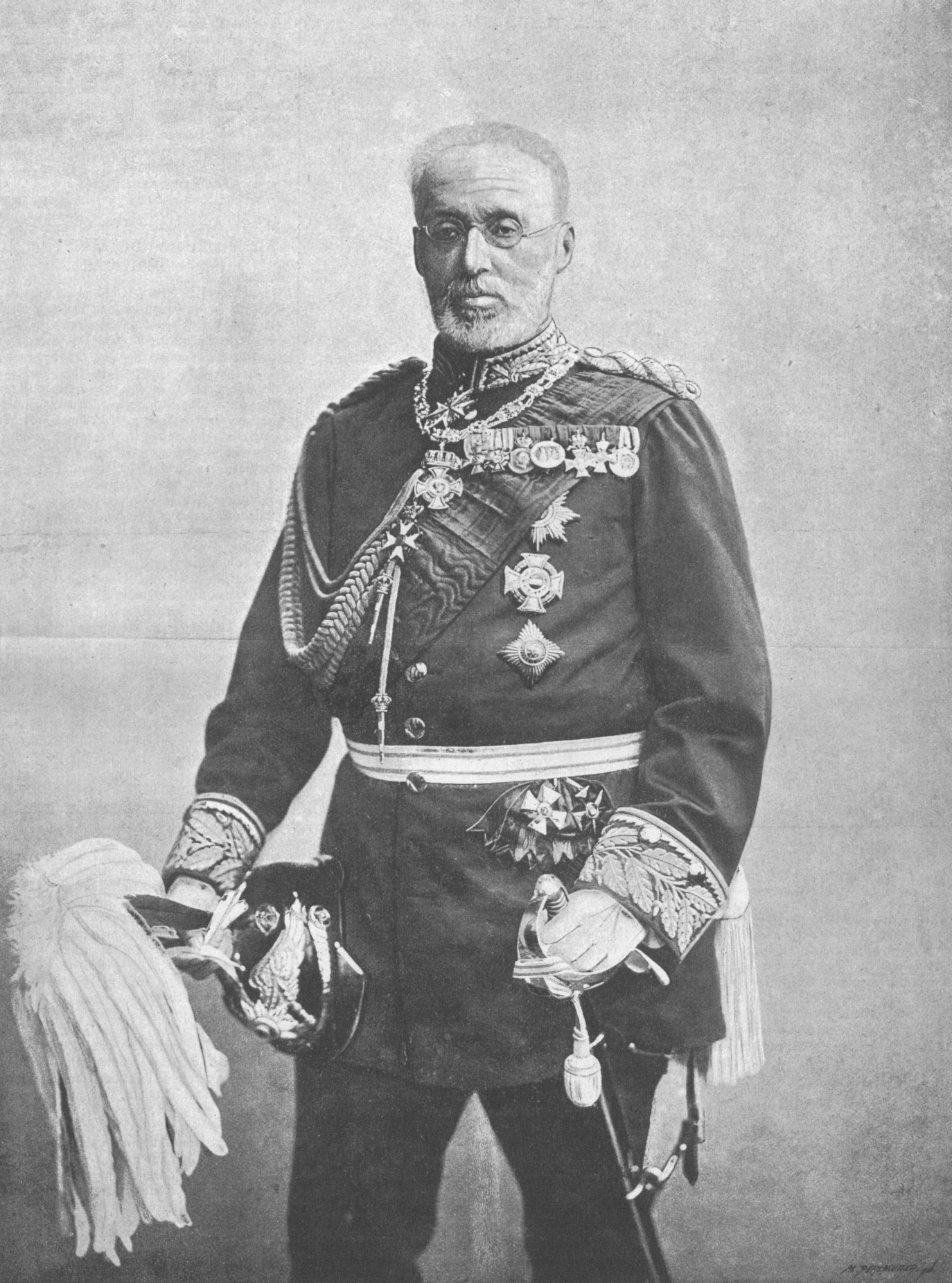
- Archduke Albrecht, c. 1893

Duke of Teschen
- Reign: 30 April 1847 – 18 February 1895
- Predecessor: Charles
- Successor: Friedrich
- Born: 3 August 1817; Vienna, Austrian Empire
- Died: 18 February 1895 (aged 77); Arco, Austria-Hungary
- Burial: Imperial Crypt
- Spouse: Princess Hildegard of Bavaria (m. 1844; died 1864)
- Issue: Maria Theresa, Duchess Philipp of Württemberg; Archduke Karl; Archduchess Mathilda
Names
- Albrecht Friedrich Rudolf Dominik
- House: Habsburg-Lorraine
- Father: Archduke Charles, Duke of Teschen
- Mother: Princess Henrietta of Nassau-Weilburg

Archduke Albrecht Friedrich Rudolf Dominik of Austria, Duke of Teschen (3 August 1817 – 18 February 1895), was an Austrian Habsburg general. He was the grandson of Emperor Leopold II and one of the chief military advisors of Emperor Franz Joseph I. As Inspector General for 36 years, he was an old-fashioned bureaucrat who largely controlled the Austro-Hungarian Army and delayed modernization. He was honored with the rank of field marshal in the armies of Austria-Hungary (1863) and Germany (1893).

According to historians John Keegan and Andrew Wheatcroft:

He was a firm conservative in all matters, military and civil, and took to writing pamphlets lamenting the state of the Army’s morale as well as fighting a fierce rearguard action against all forms of innovation…. Much of the Austrian failure in the First World War can be traced back to his long period of power…. His power was that of the bureaucrat, not the fighting soldier, and his thirty years of command over the peacetime Habsburg Army made it a flabby instrument of war.

== Early life ==
A grandson of the Emperor Leopold II, he was the eldest son of Archduke Charles of Austria, who defeated French Emperor Napoleon I at Aspern-Essling (1809), and Princess Henrietta of Nassau-Weilburg. He was the nephew of the Emperor Francis I, and cousin to Emperor Franz Joseph I's father Archduke Franz Karl of Austria, and served under Franz Joseph.

Born in Vienna, from an early age he had a military disposition, which his father encouraged. Albrecht was subject to a mild form of epilepsy, according to report, but this did not visibly interfere with his military career.

He entered the Austrian army in 1837 with Feldmarshal Joseph Radetzky as his military governor. Having received a thorough military education, Albrecht was named a Generalmajor in 1840 and promoted to Feldmarschall-Leutnant in 1843.

== Military campaigns ==
Promoted to General der Kavallerie in 1845, Albrecht was given command of Upper Austria, Lower Austria, and Salzburg. Upon the death of his father in 1847, he inherited the Palais Weilburg in Baden bei Wien, which became the family's summer home. In the winter the family lived in Vienna in the Palais Erzherzog Albrecht (the modern Albertina museum).

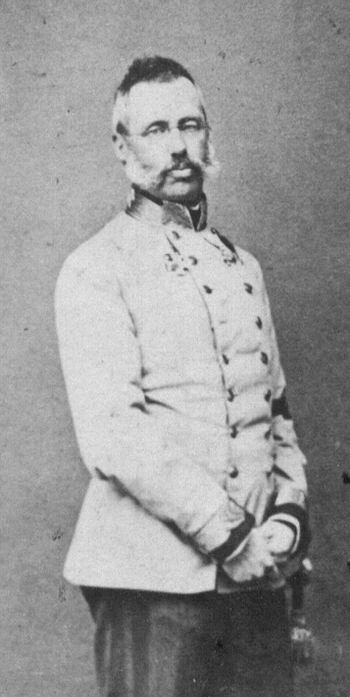

As the commandant of Vienna, Albrecht was wounded in the street fighting on 13 March 1848 at the start of the revolutionary disturbances. He issued live ammunition to his soldiers and secured the inner city, but was unable to suppress the disorder in the outlying districts. With the fall of Metternich and the formation of a city guard led by students, Albrecht pulled his troops into barracks. Radicals resented his attempt to quell the revolution while some fellow officers thought he showed a lack of resolve. Unsatisfactory to both factions and under pressure from city authorities, Albrecht was replaced by Count Auersperg.

Albrecht was sent south to command a division under Radetzky, who faced a coalition of states of the Italian peninsula led by King Charles Albert of Sardinia. Albrecht personally supervised the crossing of the Ticino and by the handling of his division ensuring victory at Novara on 23 March 1849.

He became civil and military governor of Hungary in 1851, serving until his recall in 1860. When Albrecht's wife, Archduchess Hildegard, went to Munich in March 1864 for the funeral of her brother, King Maximilian II, she became ill with a lung inflammation and pleurisy. She died in Vienna on 2 April 1864, two months short of her 38th birthday.

At the outbreak of the Seven Weeks' War in June 1866, Albrecht was named commander of the southern army facing the Italian forces of King Victor Emmanuel II. Albrecht was decisively victorious in the Battle of Custoza (24 June 1866), but failed to exploit his victory when he neglected to pursue the beaten Italian Army of the Mincio. Any advantages for the Austrians however were canceled out by the crushing defeat on 3 July at Königgrätz, where Ludwig von Benedek was surprised by the speed of Helmuth von Moltke's concentric advance into Bohemia.

Albrecht was named Oberkommandeur (Commander-in-Chief) on 10 July 1866. Benedek's defeat made any further action against Prussia impossible, however, and peace was shortly concluded with both Prussia and Italy. Besides the loss of Holstein to Prussia and Venetia to Italy in 1866, the war resulted in the transformation of the Austrian realm in 1867 into the Dual Monarchy – the Austro-Hungarian Empire.

== Inspector General ==
Albrecht remained Oberkommandeur until 1869; when Kaiser Franz Josef I assumed the title that year, Albrecht became Generalinspekteur (Inspector General), the post he occupied until his death. In 1869 he published Über die Verantwortlichkeit im Kriege (On Responsibility in War). His reform of the Austro-Hungarian Army was based on the Prussian model: development of railways and manufacturing, adoption of short-service conscription, procurement of modern weapons and reform of the Austro-Hungarian General Staff. Albrecht's program upgraded the army but he then froze it in place for the next three decades as it declined in quality. He fought liberals (including Crown Prince Rudolf) claiming their reforms would be too expensive and disruptive.

In public affairs, he was leader of the conservative Court Party, and opposed the ministry of Count Friedrich Ferdinand von Beust at every point, expressing the most inexorably reactionary views. As such he was an absolutist and opposed any liberal ideas and any weakening of the imperial power. He was somewhat more courteous to Beust's successors, though he remained given to bombastic pronouncements that may not have reflected his actual sentiments. He was widely thought, for instance, to be antipathetic toward Prussia after 1866, yet he modeled his military reforms on those of Prussia and even attended a parade of the Prussian Royal Guard in Berlin at the invitation of Emperor William I. In December 1876 Albrecht advocated a preventive war against Italy on the grounds that of all Austria's neighbors, Italy was the most hostile, could be beaten most easily, and be forced to pay compensation to Austria-Hungary, whose victory would establish it as a Great Power.

At the Congress of Berlin in 1878, the Austro-Hungarian Foreign Minister Gyula Andrássy, in addition to the Austro-Hungarian occupation of Bosnia and Herzegovina, also obtained the right to station garrisons in the Sanjak of Novi Pazar, which remained under Ottoman administration. The Sanjak preserved the separation of Serbia and Montenegro, and the Austro-Hungarian garrisons there would open the way for a dash to Salonika, supported by Albrecht, that "would bring the western half of the Balkans under permanent Austrian influence." "High [Austro-Hungarian] military authorities desired [an ...] immediate major expedition with Salonika as its objective."

On 28 September 1878 the Finance Minister, Koloman von Zell, threatened to resign if the army, behind which stood the Archduke Albert, were allowed to advance to Salonika. In the session of the Hungarian Parliament of 5 November 1878 the Opposition proposed that the Foreign Minister should be impeached for violating the constitution by his policy during the Near East Crisis and by the occupation of Bosnia-Herzegovina. The motion was lost by 179 to 95. By the Opposition rank and file the gravest accusations were raised against Andrassy.

Reputed to be the wealthiest of the Habsburgs, Albrecht owned some 300,000 acres (1,200 km^{2}) in Hungary. He also owned a fine collection of paintings and engravings, later the nucleus of the Albertina museum. His popularity was profound, for his generosity to the poor was genuine and unfeigned; he was widely known as Engelsherz (Angel's-heart).

When Albrecht was made a Feldmarschall in March 1888, Crown Prince Rudolf was appointed his subordinate as Generalinspekteur der Infanterie (Inspector General of Infantry). The new Inspector found any move toward liberal reform blocked by the War Minister, Feldzeugmeister Ferdinand von Bauer, the Chief of the General Staff, Feldzeugmeister Friedrich von Beck-Rzikowsky – and by Albrecht himself. Senior officers deferred to Albrecht who, after all, had laboriously modernized the Army after the disaster of 1866. However, the anomalous situation in the military administration was undoubtedly only one of many factors that contributed to Rudolf's suicide at Mayerling on 30 January 1889.

== Later life ==
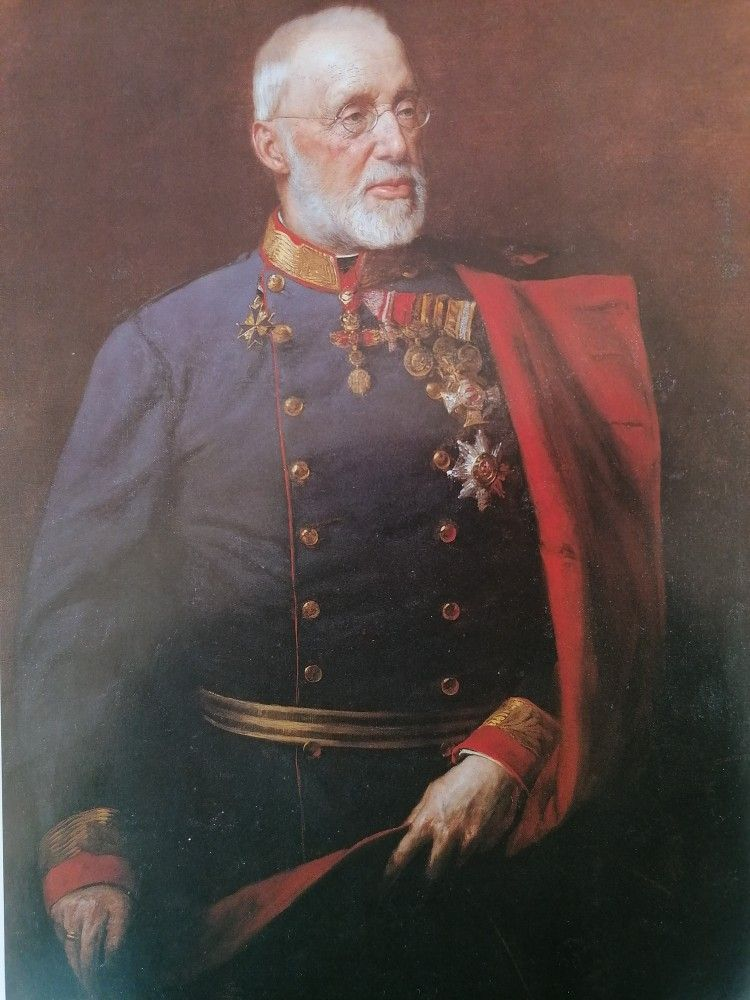
Portrait of Archduke Albrecht.

Having been made a Feldmarschall in his own army in 1863, Albrecht was the recipient of the equivalent rank of Generalfeldmarschall in the Imperial German Army in 1893, Wilhelm II, German Emperor sending General Walther von Loë to deliver the baton to Albrecht.

Archduke Albrecht continued to serve as Generalinspekteur even into advanced age - a situation not uncommon in Austria-Hungary where many commanders retained posts and commissions into old age. By 1895, though still holding his office, he was partially blind and his horse had to be led by an adjutant.

When he died in Arco on 18 February 1895, Archduke Albrecht received a state funeral and was buried in tomb 128 of the Imperial Crypt in Vienna. His fortune and his title of Duke of Teschen were inherited by his nephew, Archduke Friedrich, who served as Oberkommandeur in 1914–17.

Today, an equestrian statue of Archduke Albrecht stands near the entrance to the Albertina museum, his former city residence in Vienna.

== Family and children ==
On 1 May 1844 Albrecht married in Munich Princess Hildegard of Bavaria, daughter of King Ludwig I and Therese of Saxe-Hildburghausen. Albrecht and Hildegard had 3 children:

- Archduchess Maria Theresa of Austria-Teschen (15 July 1845, Vienna – 8 October 1927, Tübingen), married at Vienna on 18 January 1865 Duke Philipp of Württemberg (1838, Neuilly-sur-Seine – 1917, Stuttgart) and had five children:
  - Albrecht, Duke of Württemberg (1865–1939), commander on the Western Front of the German Fourth Army, 1914–17, and Army Group Duke Albrecht, 1917–18; like his grandfather, he was made a German Field Marshal in 1916.
  - Marie Amelie of Württemberg (1865–1883)
  - Isabelle of Württemberg (1871–1904)
  - Robert of Württemberg (1873–1947)
  - Ulrich of Württemberg (1877–1944)
- Archduke Karl of Austria-Teschen (3 January 1847, Vienna – 19 July 1848), died of smallpox and buried in tomb 131 of the Imperial Crypt.
- Archduchess Mathilda of Austria–Teschen (25 January 1849, Vienna – 6 June 1867, Schloss Hetzendorf, near Vienna), buried in tomb 130 of the Imperial Crypt.

== Honours ==
Albrecht received the following decorations and awards:

- Austria:
  - Knight of the Golden Fleece, 1830
  - Grand Cross of St. Stephen, 1852
  - Grand Cross of the Military Order of Maria Theresa, 1866
  - Military Merit Cross with War Decoration
  - Long Service Cross for Officers, 1st Class
- Sovereign Military Order of Malta: Grand Cross of Honour and Devotion
- Tuscany: Grand Cross of St. Joseph
- Russia:
  - Knight of St. George, 1st Class
  - Knight of St. Andrew
  - Knight of St. Alexander Nevsky
  - Knight of the White Eagle
  - Knight of St. Anna, 1st Class
  - Knight of St. Vladimir, 1st Class
- Prussia:
  - Knight of the Black Eagle, with Collar 1891
  - Knight of the Red Eagle, 1st Class
  - Grand Commander of the Royal House Order of Hohenzollern
  - Pour le Mérite (military), 10 April 1849
- France: Grand Cross of the Legion of Honour
- Brazil: Grand Cross of the Southern Cross
- Ottoman Empire: Order of Osmanieh, 1st Class in Diamonds
- Italy: Knight of the Annunciation, 21 September 1873
- Denmark: Knight of the Elephant, 19 September 1881
- Portugal: Grand Cross of the Tower and Sword
- Spain:
  - Grand Cross of the Order of Charles III, with Collar, 25 June 1883
  - Grand Cross of the Military Order of St. Ferdinand
- Bavaria:
  - Knight of St. Hubert, 1843
  - Grand Cross of the Military Order of Max Joseph
- Saxony: Knight of the Rue Crown, 1851
- Württemberg: Grand Cross of the Württemberg Crown, 1856
- Sweden–Norway: Knight of the Seraphim, 20 April 1885
- Belgium: Grand Cordon of the Order of Leopold, 1 August 1856
- Greece: Grand Cross of the Redeemer
- Hanover:
  - Knight of St. George, 1843
  - Grand Cross of the Royal Guelphic Order, 1843
- Two Sicilies:
  - Grand Cross of the Constantinian Order of St. George
  - Grand Cross of St. Ferdinand and Merit
- Romania: Grand Cross of the Star of Romania, with War Insignia
- Serbia:
  - Grand Cross of the White Eagle
  - Grand Cross of the Cross of Takovo
- Baden:
  - Knight of the House Order of Fidelity, 1856
  - Grand Cross of the Zähringer Lion, 1856
- Grand Duchy of Hesse: Grand Cross of the Ludwig Order, 7 September 1843
- Saxe-Weimar-Eisenach: Grand Cross of the White Falcon, 22 October 1859
- Nassau: Knight of the Gold Lion of Nassau, June 1858
- Brunswick: Grand Cross of Henry the Lion
- Montenegro: Grand Cross of the Order of Prince Danilo I
- Netherlands: Commander of the Military William Order, 27 June 1856
- Holy See: Knight of the Supreme Order of Christ

== Namesake ==
Albrecht's name was given to a Panzerschiff (armorclad, later battleship) launched in 1872 as Erzherzog Albrecht. Renamed Feuerspeier in 1908, she was ceded to Italy in 1920 and renamed Buttafuoco. The old ironclad survived as a hulk until she was scrapped in 1947.

== Ancestry ==
Ancestors of Archduke Albrecht, Duke of Teschen

8. Francis I, Holy Roman Emperor
4. Leopold II, Holy Roman Emperor
9. Maria Theresa, Queen of Hungary
2. Archduke Charles, Duke of Teschen
10. Charles III of Spain
5. Infanta Maria Luisa of Spain
11. Princess Maria Amalia of Saxony
1. Archduke Albrecht, Duke of Teschen
12. Charles Christian, Prince of Nassau-Weilburg
6. Frederick William, Prince of Nassau-Weilburg
13. Princess Carolina of Orange-Nassau
3. Princess Henrietta of Nassau-Weilburg
14. Wilhelm Georg, Burgrave of Kirchberg
7. Burgravine Louise Isabella of Kirchberg
15. Princess Isabelle Auguste Reuss of Greiz

== Bibliography ==
- "Death of Archduke Albrecht", The New York Times, 19 February 1895
- Robert Gardiner (editorial director), Conway's All the World's Fighting Ships 1906–1921. London: Conway Maritime Press, 1985. ISBN 0-85177-245-5
- Stefan Haderer, Loyal to the bitter end: Archduke Albrecht of Austria, Duke of Teschen, Royalty Digest Quarterly, 4/2022. Falköping: Royal Books, 2022. ISSN 1653-5219
- Robert A. Kann, A History of the Habsburg Empire 1526–1918. Berkeley: University of California Press, 1974.
- George R. Marek, The Eagles Die: Franz Joseph, Elisabeth, and Their Austria. New York: Harper & Row, 1974. ISBN 978-0-246-10880-7
- Frederic Morton, A Nervous Splendour. Vienna 1888–1889. London: The Folio Society, 2006 (first published in 1979).
- Alan Palmer, Twilight of the Habsburgs. The life and times of the Emperor Francis Joseph. New York: Grove Press, 1994.
- Rothenburg, G. (1976). The Army of Francis Joseph. West Lafayette: Purdue University Press.

== See also ==
- Erzherzog-Albrecht-Marsch

Archduke Albrecht, Duke of Teschen House of Habsburg Born: 3 August 1817 Died: 18 February 1895
Titles of nobility
Preceded by Archduke Karl	Duke of Teschen; 1847–1895	Succeeded by Archduke Friedrich
