= Gottlieb Olpp =

German medical missionary (1872–1950)

- Born: 3 January 1872; Gibeon, Namibia
- Died: 24 August 1950 (aged 78); Esslingen am Neckar, Germany
- Occupations: Tropical medicine doctor, medical missionary
- Years active: 1898–1950
- Notable work: Research on tropical diseases and medicine

Gottlieb Friedrich Adolf Olpp (3 January 1872 – 24 August 1950) was a German missionary and tropical medicine doctor, accredited with spreading Traditional Chinese Medicine and aiding the development of sinology in Germany and the West in early 20th century. As a medical missionary from the Rhenish Missionary Society from 1898 to 1907 in Dongguan, Guangdong Province of China, he conducted extensive research on local diseases and healing practices, such as Traditional Chinese Medicine (TCM) and wrote extensively throughout his life for publication in Germany on the topic of tropical medicine, theology and missionary work. After his return to Germany, he was appointed to be the director of the German Institute of Medical Missionary (Deutsches Instituts für ärztliche Mission), a director of the Tübingen Convalescent Homes and associate professor of Tropical Medicine at the University of Tübingen. A street in Tübingen is named in his honor.

== Family background ==
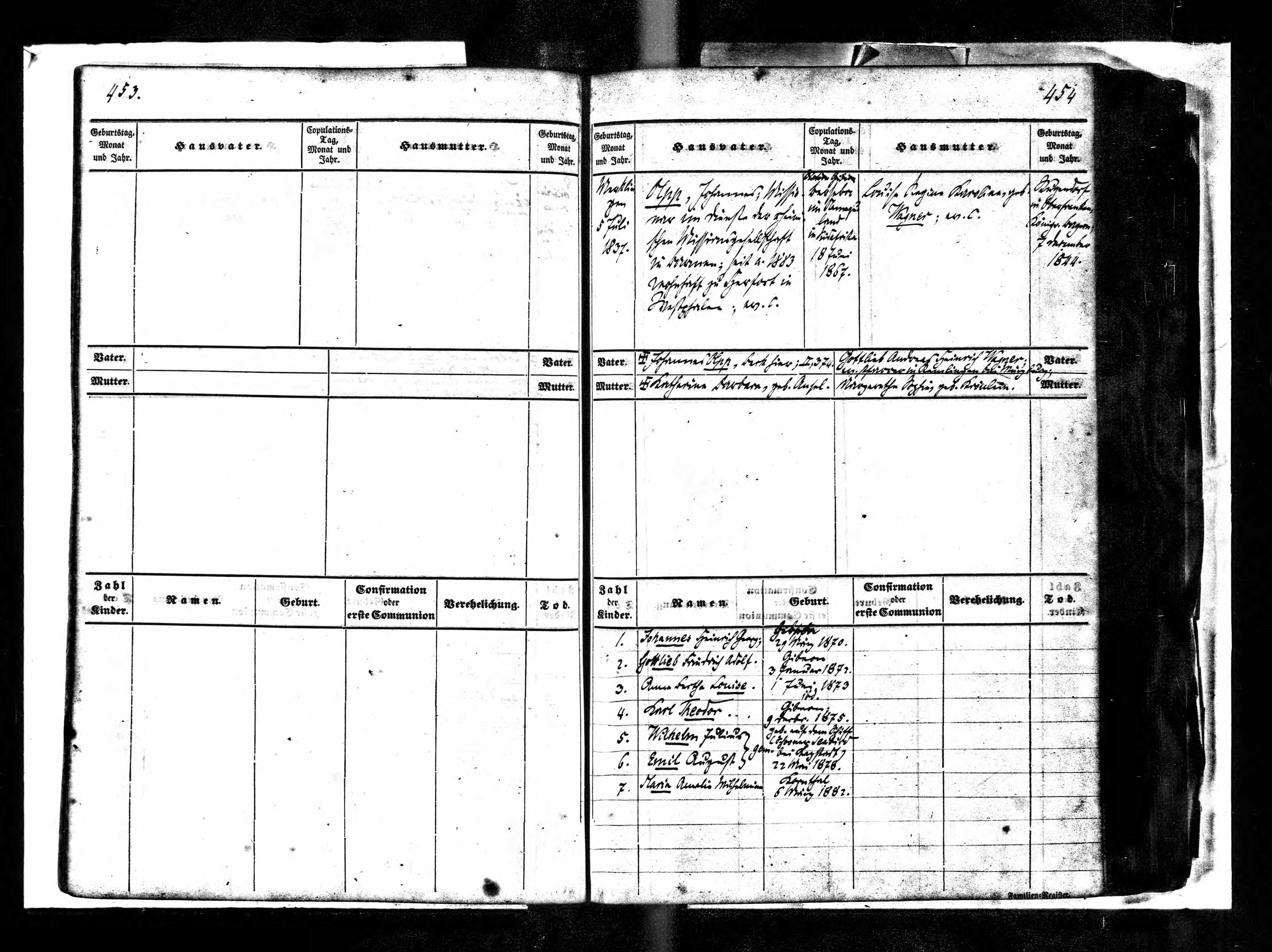
Olpp's Family Register in Württemberg

Olpp was born 3 January 1872 in Gibeon, Namibia, the second of seven children in a missionary family. His parents were members of the Rhenish Missionary Society (Rheinische Missionsgesellschaft) and married in Africa. His mother was Louise Regine Karoline Olpp, née Wagner. His father, Johannes Olpp, was ordained on the Rhenish mission in Southwest Africa from 1864 to 1879, stationed first in Berseba until 1868 then Gibeon after. Olpp's father dedicated himself to the study of Nama language, tradition and customs and published many works on this field. As a reverend at the local Gibeon church, he educated Hendrik Witbooi, one of Namibia's national heroes, and maintained correspondences with Witbooi even after his return to Germany. In 1883 to 1913, Olpp's father became a preacher in Herford, Germany, and continued to composed several books on the Rhenish Mission in Southwest Africa. Olpp's oldest brother, Johannes, and his younger brother, Theodor, also became notable members of the Rhenish Missionary Society.

He married Agnes Christine, née Wagner, in Hongkong on 21 March 1899.

== Education ==
From 1878 to 1891, he received schooling in Johanneum, Gütersloh and was raised in Salm-Horstmar. After completing his Abitur primus omnium in 1891, he pursued medical schooling at Marburg University (1891–1893), the University of Tübingen (summer term 1893), and the Ludwig-Maximilians-Universität München (1893–1895). While at these three places, he was active at the Christian student fraternity, Wingolf, where he remained in touch for life. His doctoral dissertation on Ein Fall von eitriger Pyelonephritis nach Nephrolithiasis (A case of Kidney Infection festering to Kidney Stones) was completed magna cum laude in 1895 at the Ludwig-Maximilians-Universität München. In 1896, he graduated. In the following years, he continued to build expertise in the areas of Infectious-and-Tropical Diseases by studying at the University of London, the University of Edinburgh, the University of Liverpool, the Friedrich Wilhelm University of Berlin, and the University of Paris. On 26 October 1897, he entered the Sanitation Corps in the Bavarian Army (Bayerische Armee). He was also listed in their handbook as a doctor and a Landwehr for Munich. In 1898, he began his medical residence period (Spitaldienst) in Tungkun, in Canton Province, China (now Dongguan, Guangdong Province, China).

== Career ==
=== Mission in Dongguan ===
Olpp became a member of the Rhenish Missionary Society in 1897. In 1898, he travelled to subtropical Dongguan (东莞), China, then called Tungkun, for a specialized training in Tropical and Infectious Disease. The hospital, called Puji Hospital 普济医院, was the first German missionary hospital in China. At the time of his arrival, Olpp was the second medical missionary from the Rhenish Mission in China, working alongside the first medical missionary, Dr. Johannes E. Kühne, and a male nurse who came in 1901, Johannes Baumann. The hospital compound was initially located entirely within the city walls, surrounded by Chinese dwelling, but since 1903–1906, it was relocated the bank of the East River, where cases from afar can be brought by boat directly. It was constructed to accommodate 100 patients. In order to better communicate with the local patients, Olpp spent one and a half year studying Chinese, which subsequently allowed him to perform extensive research on Tropical Diseases and to read and translate Traditional Chinese Medicine directly. Along with yearly missionary reports, Olpp wrote many academic papers and reflections on his medical experience in China to Germany via the magazine Deutschen Tropenmedizinischen Zeitschrift and Münchener Medizinische Wochenschrift (Munich Medicine Weekly). He translated and introduced parts of TCM literature, mainly from TCM classics during the Ming and Qing dynasties, such as the Ming Yi Lei An (《名医类案》 A Compilation of Healing Methods of Famous Doctors), the Shou Shi Bao Yuan (《寿世保元》 Longevity and Life Preservation), the book on surgery Jin Jian Wai Ke (《金鉴外科》 Golden Mirror of Surgery), Wang Shu He Tu Zhu Nan Jing Mai Jue (《王叔和图注难经脉决》Work of Wang Shuhe about Classics of Difficult Inquiries and Rhyming Book of Pulse), Ben Cao Gang Mu, Xuan Er Chuang Tu (《旋耳疮图》 Picture of Ulcer Behind the Ear), Chen Xiu Yuan Yi Shu Er Shi Yi Zhong (《陈修园医书二十一种》 Twenty-one Kinds of Medicine Books by Chen Xiuyuan), the Zeng Ding Yan Fang Xin Bian (《增订验方新编》 Revised Edition of New Compilation of Empirical Formulas), and the Xu Hui Xi Xian Sheng Shi San Zhong (《徐洄溪先生十三种》 Thirteen Kinds of Books.

Consistent with the negative views of TCM in the West at the time, Olpp did not have a high evaluation of TCM, calling the practice “a tall building of numerous errors and a few golden grains of truth." Portraying TCM as backward, Olpp compared the anatomical and physiological findings of TCM to the work of Galen, whose many theories have been scientifically disproven in Europe at the time. Olpp was also critical of both Chinese people and Chinese doctors, seeing their practices as an unnegligible factor in the development and spread of illnesses in China. In his later monograph On Chinese Medicine from the Perspective of Tropical Pathology, he wrote that Prolapsus uteri is partly caused by "new mothers who stood up too soon and the unskilled handling of ignorant local midwives." On the mass spread of tuberculosis in South China, he attributed a partial cause to the Chinese's lack of awareness about the dangers of infection. On the leprosy pandemic, Olpp described the Chinese population as struggling victims and criticized the lack of effective response by the Chinese government.

At the time, the negative evaluation of Western physicians about TCM led to a general disregard of Chinese doctors as not "real doctors." Olpp seemed to share a similar opinion. In one of his writings, he remarked that Chinese doctors make empty promises to patients and simply take money. In another description of modern Chinese doctors on the Munich Medicine Weekly, he emphasized their negative work ethics and encouraged youth to "pursue the train to an education in Western medicine." According to sinologist Yuan, the frequent comparison with European medicine demonstrated a clear sense of superiority over Chinese medicine. In particular on internal diseases, Olpp commented on the underdevelopment of Chinese Medicine by recounting many examples of patients who, after unsuccessful treatments with Chinese doctors, recovered thanks to European doctors. On the other hand, the failure of European treatment methods for internal disease was attributed to patients first consulting Chinese doctors. Yuan suggests that Olpp, along with other medical missionaries of the time, did not encounter actual TCM because the majority of their patients belonged to the lower class, who can only afford "quacks and European hospitals and doctors, where cheaper or free treatments are offered," whereas those from the upper social class, by and large, continued to use Traditional Chinese physicians. Regardless, the Western perception and portrayals of TCM as unmedical, Chinese doctors as morally lacking and unskilled and the general Chinese population as helpless and unaware are likely used to give meaning to the "civilized Christian purpose" of medical missions in South China.

In 1907, Olpp returned to Germany.

=== Professorship and medical missionary work ===
From 1908 to 1909, Olpp pursued further studies in Hamburg on Ships-and-Tropical Diseases, Work in Labor, Chief Physician in Herford. On 1 May 1909, he left the Rhenish Missionary Society to undertake the position of director of the German Institute for Medical Missionary (Deutsches Instituts für ärztliche Mission) in Tübingen, which he held until 1937. The organization supports worldwide Christian healthcare efforts, particularly for economically poor countries.

Olpp attended the 1910 World Missionary Conference in Edinburgh as a delegate. There, he described "the work that has commenced auspiciously in Germany" and ended his address with reverence to "the great missionary, Livingstone" and "our Lord Jesus Christ." In that same year, he compiled the monograph Beiträge zur Medizin in China mit besonderer Berücksichtigung der Tropenpathologie ("On Chinese Medicine from the Perspective of Tropical Pathology"), consisting of his extensive multilingual research, 9-year observations and medical experiences in Dongguan. The monograph also served as his Habilitation post-doctoral thesis on Tropical Medicine in Tübingen, opening doors to professorship.

On 12 September 1912, Olpp departed from Hamburg on the SS Kaiserin Auguste Victoria. He came to New York City on the 22 September with a final destination in the US of Washington, DC.

In Summer 1914, he was giving lectures on Tropical Disease and Tropical Hygiene for the Medicine Department at the University of Tübingen. In 1916, he was appointed as chief physician for the newly opened Tübinger Tropengenesungsheims (Tuebinger Convalescent Homes), also called Tropical Clinic Paul-Lechler-Hospital. The institute has direct connections with and is supported by Difäm, originally created to take care of those returning home from tropical areas. Olpp held an address about the clinic and its importance in global medical missions at a conference by natural sciences and medicine organization in Tübingen on 14 May 1916 and wrote about it at length on the magazine Deutsche Medizinische Zeitschrift in 1936.

On 2 July 1917, he became an associate professor in the University of Tübingen. As of 1926, he was teaching Tropenkrankenheit (Tropical Diseases) as a medical faculty at the Nauklerstrasse 47 building. The building was originally built in 1908–1909 to serve medical missionaries. During his tenure, he oversaw 32 dissertations from his students. On 19 October 1934, he received an honorary degree in theology by the Martin Luther University Halle-Wittenberg. Due to deteriorating health, Olpp left Difäm, the Paul-Lechler Hospital and Tübingen on 1 October 1937 and moved to Schwarzenbruck-Rummelsberg. There, he continued his medical practice, support for medical missionary and research on submerged intestinal bath.

=== Later life ===
Olpp died on 24 August 1950 in Esslingen am Neckar, Germany. His last work on submerged intestinal bath was published posthumously.

== Impact and recognition ==
Olpp's work was well received by his peers during his lifetime and recognized by later historians. His translations of Traditional Chinese Medicine was highly valued by sinologists and medical historians, in particular Dr. Franz Hübotter. Olpp's reports to the Rhenish Mission Society, his own publications on missionary experiences and frequent articles on the Munich Medicine Weekly provided a lot of valuable information about the medical and hygienic conditions in China at the time.

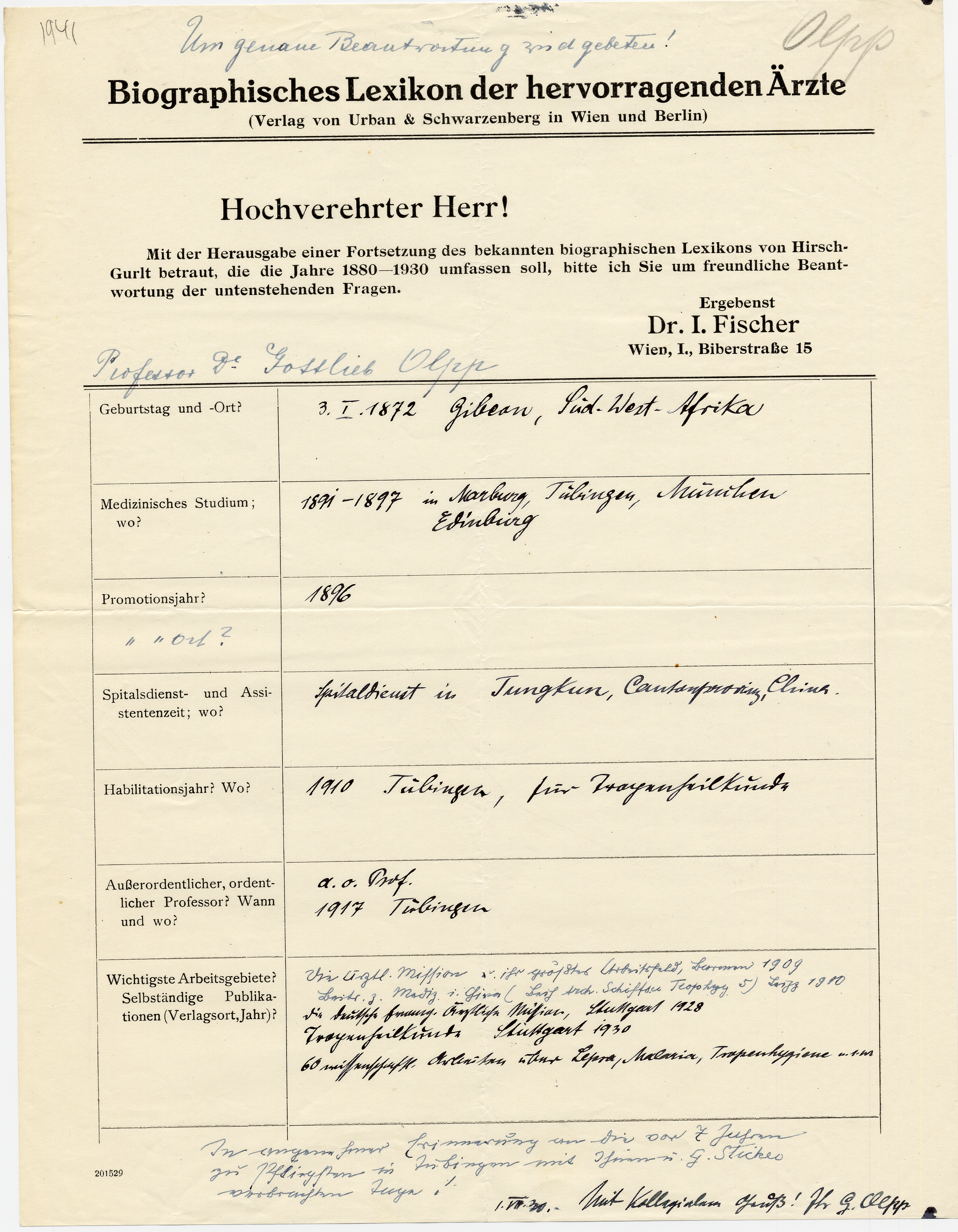
Olpp's autobiographical information for Dr. Fischer's "Biographisches Lexikon der hervorragenden Ärzte"

Different from his contemporaries, Olpp did not entirely reject Traditional Chinese Medicine but approached it factually. Although he was highly critical of its medical benefits, Olpp highlighted its cultural and historical significance. Since up until that point, translations of TCM literature have only come from a non-medical professional, Olpp's medical expertise and deepened cultural knowledge from interactions with his patients produced important Sino-German works that radically changed the interpretation and translation method of TCM and made him an important figure in the spread of TCM to the West and development of sinology.

On 5 October 1916, along with many in his military cohort, he was awarded the Wilhelm Cross with Swords (Wilhelmskreuz mit Schwerter) issued by the Kingdom of Württemberg for his service as a doctor and Landwehr member.

He was successful as a book author.

In 1930, he was invited to be included in a Germany biographical dictionary of outstanding physicians covering 1880-1930 by Dr. Fischer.

His short biography was written by Wilhelm G. Neusel and included in the compilation Württembergische Biographien 2 in 2011. A street is named after him in Tübingen, called Gottlieb-Olpp-Straße, which leads to the Paul-Lechler Tropical Clinic.

== Bibliography/publications ==
- (1909 & 1918) Die ärztliche Mission und ihr größtes Arbeitsfeld
- (1910) Beiträge zur Medizin in China mit besonderer Berücksichtigung der Tropenpathologie ("On Chinese Medicine from the Perspective of Tropical Pathology").
- (1913) Schwarzwasserfieber (Blackwater Fever)
- (1922) Medizin und Naturwissenschaften in China (Medicine and Natural Sciences in China)
- (1912 & 1923) Malaria
- (1928) Die deutsche ev. ärztliche Mission
- (1929) Moderne ärztliche Mission in aller Welt (Modern Medical Missions across the world)
- (1929) Die internationale ärztliche Mission (The International Medical Mission)
- (1930) Tropenheilkunde: Leitfaden für die Praxis (Tropical Treatments: Handbook for Practical Use)
- (1930) Hervorragende Tropenärzte in Wort und Bild (The Great Tropical Doctors in Words and Pictures)
- (1934) 25 Jahre deutsche ärztliche Mission (25 Years of German Medical Missions)
- (1935) German Medical Mission Book Review
- (1935) Ruf und Dienst der ärztlichen Mission (The Call and Service to Medical Missions)
- (1936) Charakterköpfe der Tropenmedizin (Characteristics of Tropical Medicine)
- (1954) Das subaquale Darmbad und seine Verwendung (The Submerged Intestinal Bath and its uses) - after his death
- various publications on the Deutschen Tropenmedizinischen Zeitschrift and Münchener Medizinische Wochenschrift
