= Wilhelm Cross =

Imperial German wartime decoration

Wilhelm Cross (German: Wilhelmskreuz)
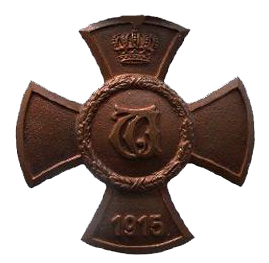
- Obverse view of the Wilhelm Cross
- Type: Wartime decoration in two classes
- Awarded for: Meritorious wartime service
- Description: Bronze cross
- Country: German Empire
- Presented by: Kingdom of Württemberg
- Eligibility: Military and civilians
- Campaign: World War I
- Status: No longer awarded
- Established: 13 September 1915
- First award: 1915
- Final award: 1918

Highlights
- Total: 1,943 (without swords); 5,329 (with swords); 108 (with swords and crown)
- Related: Charlottenkreuz

The Wilhelm Cross (German: Wilhelmskreuz) was a wartime decoration of the Kingdom of Württemberg, instituted in 1915 during World War I for meritorious service by military personnel and civilians.

== Establishment and duration ==
The Wilhelm Cross was instituted on 13 September 1915 by a royal decree of King Wilhelm II. The monarchy of Württemberg was overthrown during the German revolution of 1918–1919 that followed Germany's defeat in the war, and the Wilhelm Cross ceased to be awarded.

== Eligibility ==
The cross was created to recognize those persons, both military personnel and civilians, who rendered meritorious service during wartime through their official or voluntary activities, without having directly participated as a combatant in the war. The service could be provided on the home front and could be related to the war effort or to the public welfare.

== Classes ==
The Wilhelm Cross existed in two different classes:

- Wilhelm Cross. This was the lower graded award, issued for meritorious service. This medal was suspended on a ribbon, and when awarded to military personnel was presented with attached crossed swords (mit Schwerten).
- Wilhelm Cross with Swords and Crown. This was the higher distinction, awarded for exceptional merit and bestowed only on military personnel. It was a pin-back cross, without a ribbon. Recipients first had to have received the lower-graded decoration.

== Description ==
The 45 mm cross, made of dark-oxidized bronze, featured stippled arms with outwardly curved sides and rounded ends, which were framed by a raised border. At the top of the lower-graded cross was a round eyelet which was used to attach it to the ribbon ring. When awarded with swords, the cross carried two upward-pointing, antique style, crossed swords appearing to pass through the medallion. The higher-graded award, in addition to the swords, was surmounted by an embossed open-sculpted representation of the Crown of Württemberg, 20-mm-high and 23-mm-wide. Later in the war, the crosses were made of a bronzed zinc alloy, called Kriegsmetall (war metal).

Obverse: Within the cross's center 22 mm circular medallion was inscribed the royal monogram W in raised Gothic script, surrounded with a dense oak leaf wreath, tied crosswise with ribbons at the top and bottom. An image of the crown appears on the upper arm of the cross, while the raised date 1915 appears on the lower arm. The crown image was not present on the upper-graded award, which featured the large crown sculpture.

Reverse: The medallion contained the two-line inscription KRIEGS VERDIENST (war merit) in capital letters, likewise enclosed by a dense wreath of oak leaves tied with ribbons at both the top and the bottom. The inscription was omitted on civilian crosses that were presented for services not directly related to the war effort. The upper-graded pin-back version had a plain flat back, with no medallion wreath and no inscription.

== Ribbon and placement ==
The lower-graded cross was worn on the left breast, suspended from a 34-mm-wide lemon-yellow ribbon, with two 3-mm-wide black stripes, spaced 4 mm from the 2 narrower black border stripes, each 1.5-mm-wide. The higher-graded cross with swords and crown was pinned directly on the left of the tunic, below the ribbon bar.

== Number awarded ==
The number of awards bestowed were 1,943 Wilhelm Crosses without swords, 5,329 Wilhelm Crosses with Swords and 108 Wilhelm Crosses with Swords and Crown.

== Selected recipients ==
- Albrecht, Duke of Württemberg, with swords and crown
- Alexander Baumann without swords
- Duke Carl Alexander of Württemberg, with swords and crown (WKzmKrX)
- Gottlieb Olpp, with swords (WKzX)
- Konstantin von Neurath, without swords (WKz)
- Duke Philipp of Württemberg, with swords and crown
- Philipp Albrecht, Duke of Württemberg, with swords and crown
- Duke Robert of Württemberg, with swords and crown
- Ernst Udet, with swords
- Wilhelm Karl, Duke of Urach, with swords and crown
- Wilhelm von Urach, with swords and crown

== Sources ==
- Hessenthal, Waldemar von; Schreiber, Georg (2001). Honours and Awards of the German States. Naval & Military Press. ISBN 978-1-843-42144-3.
- Wilhelms-Kreuz 2. Klasse mit Schwertern ( 1915 - 1918 ) in the Imperial War Museum website
- Wilhelmskreuz ohne Schwerter für Kriegsverdienst in the Ehrenzeichen-Orden website
- Wilhelmskreuz mit Schwerter für Kriegsverdienst in the Ehrenzeichen-Orden website
- Wilhelmskreuz-Steckkreuz mit Schwertern und Krone in the Ehrenzeichen-Orden website
