= Archduchess Mathilda of Austria =

Austrian archduchess (1849–1867)

Archduchess Mathilde of Austria
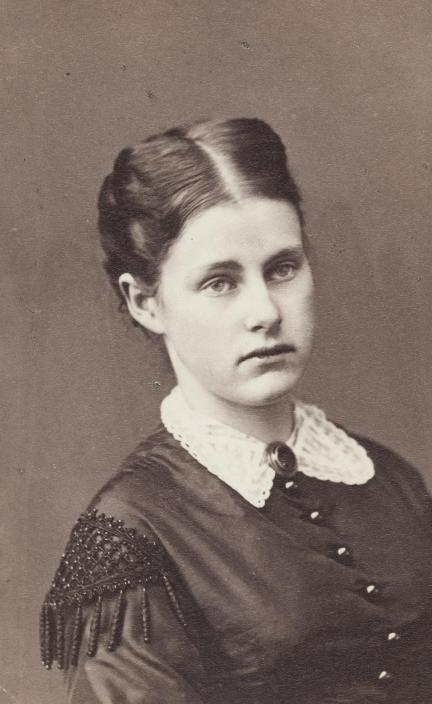
- Mathilde in 1867
- Born: 25 January 1849; Vienna, Austrian Empire
- Died: 6 June 1867 (aged 18); Schloss Hetzendorf, Austria-Hungary
- Burial: 11 June 1867; Imperial Crypt, Vienna
Names
- German: Mathilde Marie Adelgunde Alexandra
- House: Habsburg-Lorraine
- Father: Archduke Albert, Duke of Teschen
- Mother: Princess Hildegard of Bavaria

Archduchess Mathilde Marie Adelgunde Alexandra of Austria (25 January 1849 – 6 June 1867) was a member of the House of Habsburg-Lorraine as the daughter of Archduke Albert, Duke of Teschen. She was intended to become the Queen of Italy as the wife of King Umberto I, but her early death prevented the marriage.

== Ancestry and family ==
Mathilde was born on 25 January 1849 in Vienna as the third child and second daughter of Archduke Albert, Duke of Teschen (1817–1895), a Field Marshal in the Austro-Hungarian Army and Princess Hildegard of Bavaria (1825–1864). On her father's side, she was the great-granddaughter of Leopold II, Holy Roman Emperor, and on her mother's side, she was the granddaughter of King Ludwig I of Bavaria. She was named after her maternal aunts Mathilde Caroline, Grand Duchess of Hesse (1813–1862), Adelgunde, Duchess of Modena (1823–1862), and Princess Alexandra of Bavaria, with whom her mother was very close.

Mathilde had two older siblings. Her sister Maria Theresa (1845–1927) became the wife of Duke Philip of Württemberg (1838–1917), while her brother Charles Albert (1847–1848) had already died of smallpox by the time Mathilde was born.

== Early life ==
Mathilde's father, Archduke Albert, inherited Weilburg Palace in Baden bei Wien in 1847, and the family spent five months of every year (around summer) there, as had been the tradition during Archduke Albert's own childhood. Archduchess Hildegard was very popular in Baden as she was very charitable, and she was known as Engelsherz ("Angelheart"). She taught her daughters to be charitable, too.

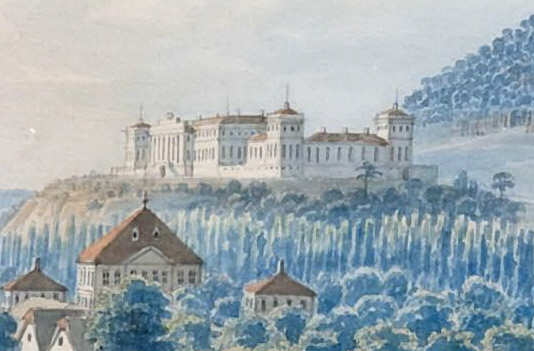
Weilburg Palace, the summer home of Mathilde's family

During the winter, the family lived in the Archduke Albert Palace (today the Albertina museum) in Vienna, which was close to the Hofburg, the imperial residence. The family of Archduke Albert was very close to the family of his second cousin once removed, Emperor Franz Joseph I, and especially to his wife Empress Elisabeth, who was childhood friends with Archduchess Hildegard, her first cousin.

Due to Archduke Albert's various official duties, his wife and their children mostly lived apart from him until April 1852, when they moved to Buda (today a part of Budapest, Hungary), where he had been appointed as the military and civil governor of Hungary the previous year. They lived in Sándor Palace until 1860, while the royal palace of Buda Castle was being renovated and refurbished after the damages of the Revolution of 1848, and then moved into the royal palace.

In March 1864, Mathilde's uncle, King Maximilian II of Bavaria died, and her mother travelled to the funeral in Munich, where she fell ill with lung inflammation and pleurisy, and died in early April.

On 28 October 1865, Mathilde was confirmed into the Roman Catholic Church by the Prince-Archbishop of Vienna, Joseph Othmar Rauscher. Her aunt Adelgunde, Duchess of Modena became her godmother. On 23 December 1865, she stood proxy for the godmother, Queen Victoria of the United Kingdom, at the baptism of her niece, Duchess Maria Amalia of Württemberg (1865–1883). At the emperor's request, Mathilde was taught history and literature between 1866 and 1867 by Leopold Neumann, a professor of history and international law at the University of Vienna.

Mathilde was close friends with her paternal third cousin (and also stepdaughter of Mathilde's paternal uncle, Archduke Karl Ferdinand (1818–1874) Archduchess Maria Theresa of Austria-Este (1849–1919), who was her age, and later became Queen of Bavaria as the wife of King Ludwig III, Mathilde's maternal first cousin.

Around this time, Mathilde's paternal third cousin from the Italian line of the House of Habsburg, Archduke Ludwig Salvator fell in love with her. However, the family was planning a dynastic marriage of high importance for Mathilde: she was to marry Prince Umberto of Savoy, the Crown Prince of Italy (1844–1900), in order to improve the strained relationship between Austria-Hungary and Italy. Had they married, Mathilde would have become Queen of Italy upon her husband's succession in 1878 as Umberto I.

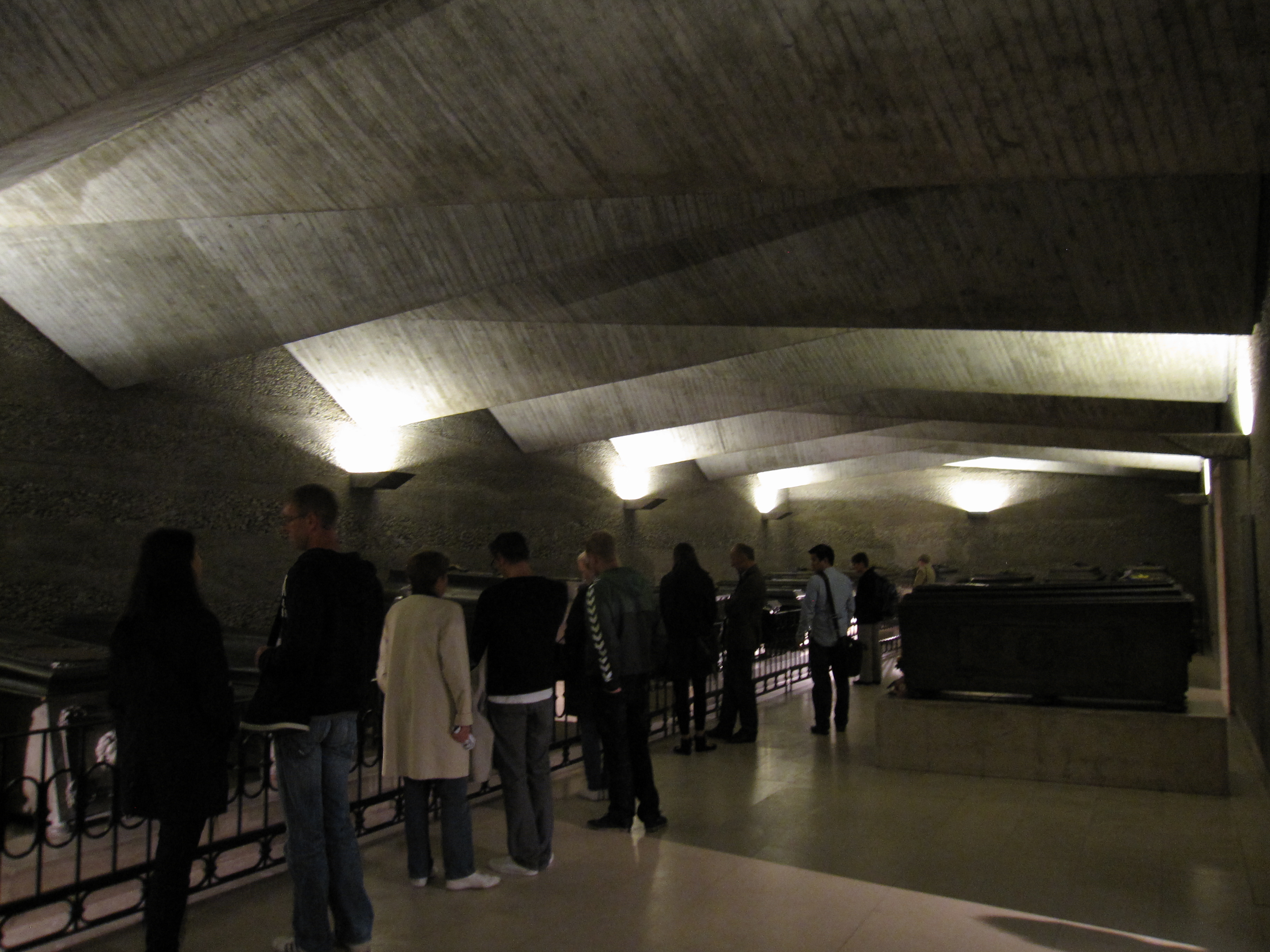
The New Vault of the Imperial Crypt in Vienna, the final resting place of Mathilde and her family

== Death ==
Archduchess Mathilde died of accidental self-immolation on 6 June 1867 at 6 p.m at Hetzendorf Palace in Vienna, at the age of 18. On 22 May 1867 she had put on a gauze dress to go to the theatre, then lit a cigarette to smoke. Soon, she heard the approach of her father, who had strictly forbidden smoking. She hid the cigarette behind her, setting the very flammable material of her dress on fire. Her back, arm, neck, and her lower extremities were severely burned before the fire could be extinguished. She suffered second and third-degree burns on her whole body, with parts of her dress burning into her skin, and she died of these injuries two weeks after the accident. Her whole family witnessed her death.

On 9 June 1867, Mathilde's heart was buried in the Loreto Chapel of the Augustinian Church, Vienna, as was traditional for the family. On 10 June, her body was taken to the Imperial Crypt beneath the Capuchin Church in Vienna, the imperial family's principal place of entombment. The funeral procession was held at night, by torchlight, and the whole imperial family and household participated in it, with a large crowd of spectators gathering along the roads. Her sarcophagus was placed in the Tuscan Tomb on 11 June at noon, next to that of her mother and her brother Charles Albert. Today, they all rest in the New Vault of the crypt, alongside its north wall, together with Archduke Albert, who died in 1895.

== Ancestry ==
Ancestors of Archduchess Mathilda of Austria

8. Leopold II, Holy Roman Emperor
4. Archduke Charles, Duke of Teschen
9. Infanta Maria Louisa of Spain
2. Archduke Albrecht, Duke of Teschen
10. Frederick William, Prince of Nassau-Weilburg
5. Princess Henrietta of Nassau-Weilburg
11. Burgravine Louise Isabelle of Kirchberg
1. Archduchess Mathilda of Austria
12. Maximilian I Joseph of Bavaria
6. Ludwig I of Bavaria
13. Princess Augusta Wilhelmine of Hesse-Darmstadt
3. Princess Hildegard of Bavaria
14. Frederick, Duke of Saxe-Altenburg
7. Princess Therese of Saxe-Hildburghausen
15. Duchess Charlotte Georgine of Mecklenburg-Strelitz
