= Prince Johann Georg of Saxony =

Prince of Saxony, and art expert and collector (1869–1938)

Prince Johann Georg
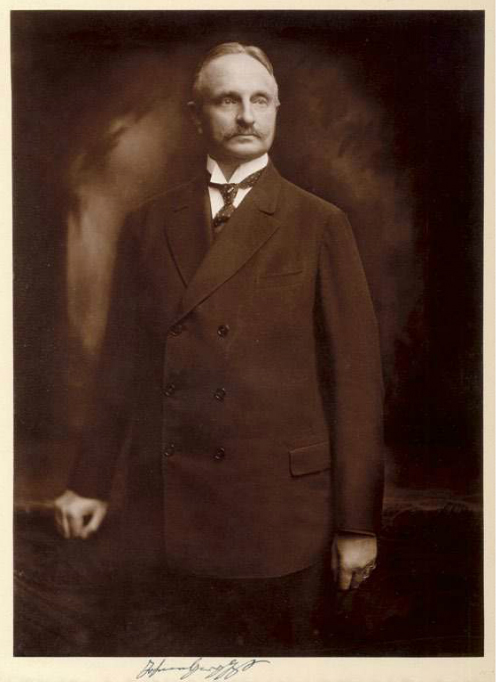
- Photograph, 1930.
- Born: 10 July 1869; Dresden, North German Confederation
- Died: 24 November 1938 (aged 69); Schloss Altshausen, Altshausen, Nazi Germany
- Burial: Alter Katholischer Friedhof, Dresden, Germany
- Spouses: Duchess Maria Isabella of Württemberg (m. 1894; died 1904) Princess Maria Immacolata of Bourbon-Two Sicilies (m. 1906)
Names
- German: Johann Georg Pius Karl Leopold Maria Januarius Anacletus; John George Pius Charles Leopold Maria Januarius Anacletus
- House: Wettin
- Father: George of Saxony
- Mother: Maria Ana of Portugal

Prince Johann Georg Pius Karl Leopold Maria Januarius Anacletus of Saxony, Duke of Saxony (10 July 1869 – 24 November 1938) was the sixth child and second-eldest son of George of Saxony and Infanta Maria Ana of Portugal and the younger brother of the Kingdom of Saxony's last king, Frederick Augustus III of Saxony. He was a well-known arts expert and an avid art collector.

== Early life ==
Johann Georg was the sixth of eight children and the second son of George of Saxony, the penultimate king of Saxony, and his wife Infanta Maria Ana of Portugal. The prince was raised in Dresden and received a strict Roman Catholic upbringing.

Johann Georg's early education was conducted by private teachers until 1881, when he began his military training. From 1889 through 1890, Johann Georg and his younger brother Maximilian studied law together in Freiburg im Breisgau. After switching to the University of Leipzig, Johann Georg mainly attended lectures on history and art history. In 1909, the prince received an honorary doctorate from the University of Leipzig.

== Royal career ==
In October 1902, he was sent on a mission to the various courts of Europe to announce the accession of his father King Georg to the throne four months earlier. He was received by King Edward VII in London on 12 October, and also visited Windsor Castle.

The Emperor of Austria appointed him Honorary Colonel of the 11th Infantry Regiment of the Austro-Hungarian Army in 1902, and the prince visited Vienna in January 1903 to acknowledge this honour and the good relation between the families.

== Marriage ==
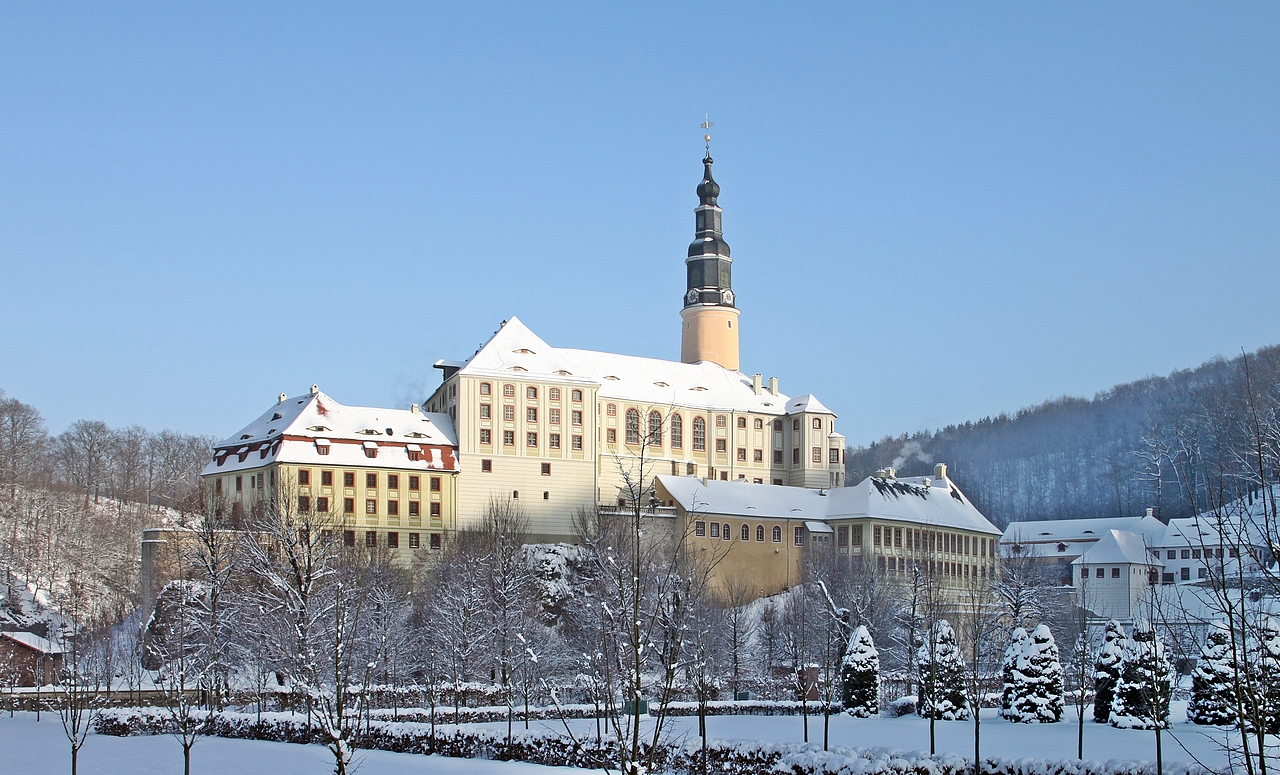
Schloss Weesenstein in winter

Johann Georg first married Duchess Maria Isabella of Württemberg, third child and second daughter of Duke Philipp of Württemberg and Archduchess Maria Theresa of Austria, on 5 April 1894 in Stuttgart, Württemberg; they did not have children. Maria Isabella died on 24 May 1904 at age 32 in Dresden.

His second marriage was to Princess Maria Immacolata of Bourbon-Two Sicilies, fourth child and first daughter of Prince Alfonso of Bourbon-Two Sicilies, Count of Caserta, and his wife Antonietta, on 30 October 1906 in Cannes, France. This marriage too was without issue.

== Residences ==
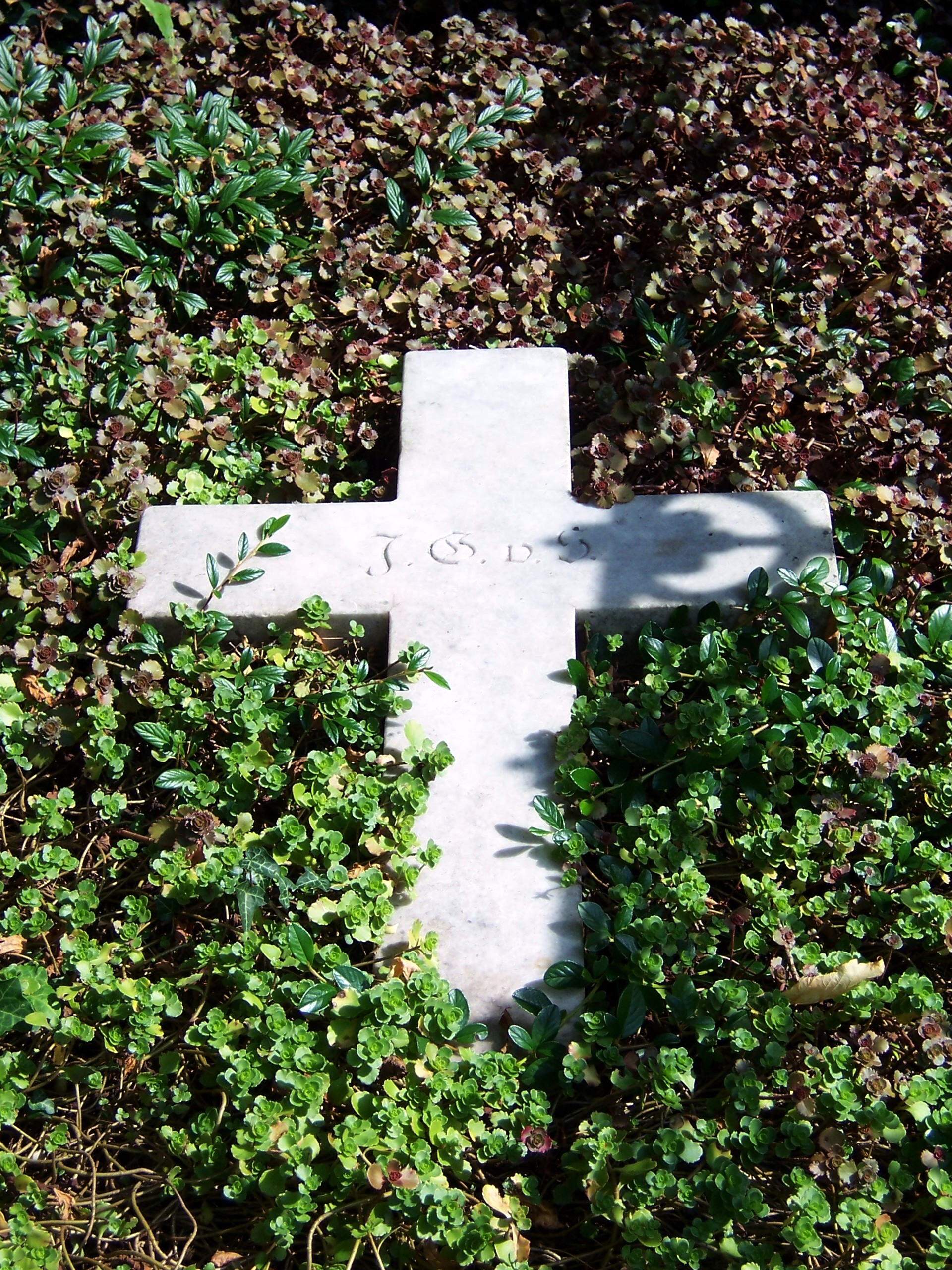
Johann Georg's burial site at the Katholische Hofkirche.

From 1902, Johann Georg resided at Schloss Weesenstein approximately 30 km from Dresden, high above Müglitztal. In 1918, after the end of World War I and the abdication of his brother Frederick Augustus III, Johann Georg sold Schloss Weesenstein and moved his permanent residence to Freiburg im Breisgau.

== Honours ==
- Kingdom of Saxony: Knight of the Order of the Rue Crown, 1881
- Austria-Hungary:
  - Grand Cross of the Order of St. Stephen, 1891
  - Knight of the Order of the Golden Fleece, 1898
- Baden: Knight of the House Order of Fidelity, 1905
- Kingdom of Bavaria: Knight of the Order of St. Hubert, 1898
- Grand Duchy of Hesse: Grand Cross of the Ludwig Order, 6 April 1892
- Kingdom of Prussia: Knight of the Order of the Black Eagle 23 September 1889
- Saxe-Weimar-Eisenach: Grand Cross of the Order of the White Falcon, 1890
- Württemberg: Grand Cross of the Order of the Württemberg Crown, 1892
- Spain: Grand Cross of the Order of Charles III, with Collar, 20 October 1908

== Ancestry ==
Ancestors of Prince Johann Georg of Saxony

8. Maximilian, Hereditary Prince of Saxony
4. John of Saxony
9. Princess Carolina of Parma
2. George of Saxony
10. Maximilian I Joseph of Bavaria
5. Princess Amalie Auguste of Bavaria
11. Princess Caroline of Baden
1. Prince Johann Georg of Saxony
12. Prince Ferdinand of Saxe-Coburg and Gotha
6. Ferdinand II of Portugal
13. Princess Maria Antonia Koháry of Csábrág and Szitnya
3. Infanta Maria Ana of Portugal
14. Pedro I of Brazil and IV of Portugal
7. Maria II of Portugal
15. Archduchess Leopoldina of Austria
