= Order of the Rue Crown =

Order of knighthood of the Kingdom of Saxony

Order of the Rue Crown Hausorden der Rautenkrone
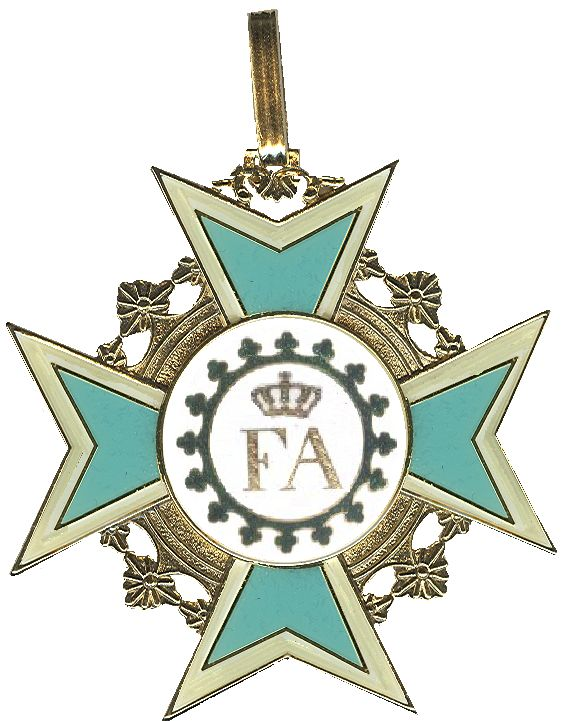
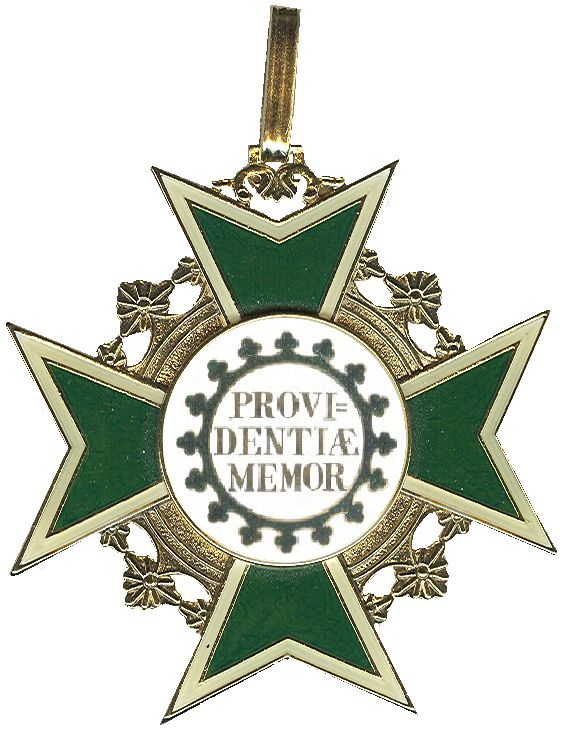
- Cross of the order, obverse and reverse
- Type: State Order (formerly); House Order (currently)
- Country: Kingdom of Saxony
- Royal house: House of Wettin
- Motto: PROVIDENTIÆ MEMOR
- Awarded for: Civil merit and service to the Royal House
- Sovereign: Prince Alexander
- Grades: Knight

Precedence
- Next (higher): None
- Next (lower): Military Order of St. Henry
- Ribbon of the order

The Order of the Rue Crown (German: Hausorden der Rautenkrone) or Order of the Crown of Saxony was a dynastic order of knighthood of the Kingdom of Saxony. The order takes its name from the green floral crown of rue (crancelin) found in the coat of arms of Saxony. It occupies the highest rank in the former Saxon honour system.

== History ==
The order was created to be the civil counterpart to the Military Order of St. Henry, the only order previously at the disposal of the new king. It was established in 1807 by Frederick Augustus I, the first King of Saxony. The order was originally limited to 24 knights, but exceptions were made for members of ruling houses and those whose membership in the order would add to its prestige.

The Order of the Rue Crown was presented in a single grade, Knight. Twice, the order was granted in a special grade with diamonds, to Portuguese Prime Minister Dom Nuno José de Moura Barreto, Duke of Loulé in 1859 and Chancellor Otto von Bismarck in 1885. From its founding to the fall of the Kingdom of Saxony in 1918, the order was presented 332 times.

== Appearance ==
The badge of the order is a gold Maltese cross, enameled in green with a white border. The white center medallion features the crowned monogram of Frederick Augustus I of Saxony, encircled by a green crown of rue. Between the arms of the cross is a golden crown of rue.

The star of the order is made of silver and has eight points. The center of the star bears a gold medallion with the motto of the order, PROVIDENTIÆ MEMOR, inside a ring of green rue leaves.

The badge of the order is borne on a riband of grass green, worn over the right shoulder.

== Knights ==
Expand for list
- Prince Adalbert of Prussia (1884–1948)
- Adolphe, Grand Duke of Luxembourg
- Albert I of Belgium
- Prince Albert of Prussia (1809–1872)
- Prince Albert of Saxe-Altenburg
- Albert of Saxony
- Archduke Albrecht, Duke of Teschen
- Albert, Prince Consort
- Prince Albert of Prussia (1837–1906)
- Albert, Prince of Schwarzburg-Rudolstadt
- Alexander II of Russia
- Alexander III of Russia
- Prince Alexander of Hesse and by Rhine
- Alexander, Margrave of Meissen
- Alfonso XIII
- Alfred, 2nd Prince of Montenuovo
- Alexander Cambridge, 1st Earl of Athlone
- Prince August of Saxe-Coburg and Gotha
- Maximilian de Beauharnais, 3rd Duke of Leuchtenberg
- Bernhard II, Duke of Saxe-Meiningen
- Prince Bernhard of Saxe-Weimar-Eisenach (1792–1862)
- Jérôme Bonaparte
- Walther Bronsart von Schellendorff
- Bernhard von Bülow
- Karl von Bülow
- Carl, 3rd Prince of Leiningen
- Infante Carlos María Isidro of Spain
- Charles I of Austria
- Charles I of Württemberg
- Charles X
- Charles XIV John
- Charles Alexander, Grand Duke of Saxe-Weimar-Eisenach
- Charles Augustus, Hereditary Grand Duke of Saxe-Weimar-Eisenach (1844–1894)
- Charles Edward, Duke of Saxe-Coburg and Gotha
- Prince Charles of Prussia
- Chlodwig, Prince of Hohenlohe-Schillingsfürst
- Christian IX of Denmark
- Prince Christian of Schleswig-Holstein
- Constantine I of Greece
- Prince Eduard of Saxe-Altenburg
- Edward VII
- Prince Eitel Friedrich of Prussia
- Ernest I, Duke of Saxe-Coburg and Gotha
- Ernest II, Duke of Saxe-Coburg and Gotha
- Prince Ernest Augustus, 3rd Duke of Cumberland and Teviotdale
- Ernest Louis, Grand Duke of Hesse
- Ernst I, Duke of Saxe-Altenburg
- Ernst Gunther, Duke of Schleswig-Holstein
- Prince Ernst Heinrich of Saxony
- Ernst II, Duke of Saxe-Altenburg
- Ferdinand I of Austria
- Ferdinand II of Portugal
- Ferdinand III, Grand Duke of Tuscany
- Ferdinand IV, Grand Duke of Tuscany
- Archduke Ferdinand Karl of Austria
- Prince Ferdinand of Bavaria
- Emanuele Filiberto, 2nd Duke of Aosta
- Francis II of the Two Sicilies
- Francisco de Asís, Duke of Cádiz
- Archduke Franz Ferdinand of Austria
- Franz Joseph I of Austria
- Archduke Franz Karl of Austria
- Prince Franz of Bavaria
- Frederick Augustus II, Grand Duke of Oldenburg
- Frederick Augustus II of Saxony
- Frederick Augustus III of Saxony
- Frederick Francis II, Grand Duke of Mecklenburg-Schwerin
- Frederick Francis III, Grand Duke of Mecklenburg-Schwerin
- Frederick I, Duke of Anhalt
- Frederick I, Grand Duke of Baden
- Frederick III, German Emperor
- Prince Frederick of Württemberg
- Frederick William III of Prussia
- Frederick William, Grand Duke of Mecklenburg-Strelitz
- Frederick, Duke of Saxe-Altenburg
- Friedrich Christian, Margrave of Meissen
- Prince Friedrich Karl of Prussia (1828–1885)
- Prince Friedrich Leopold of Prussia
- Archduke Friedrich, Duke of Teschen
- Georg II, Duke of Saxe-Meiningen
- Georg, Crown Prince of Saxony
- Georg, Duke of Saxe-Altenburg
- George V of Hanover
- George V
- George, King of Saxony
- Gustaf V
- Gustaf VI Adolf
- Gustav, Prince of Vasa
- Max von Hausen
- Prince Henry of Prussia (1862–1929)
- Heinrich VII, Prince Reuss of Köstritz
- Prince Hermann of Saxe-Weimar-Eisenach (1825–1901)
- Paul von Hindenburg
- Prince Joachim of Prussia
- Archduke John of Austria
- Prince Johann Georg of Saxony
- Johannes, 11th Prince of Thurn and Taxis
- John of Saxony
- Duke John Albert of Mecklenburg
- Joseph, Duke of Saxe-Altenburg
- Karl Anton, Prince of Hohenzollern
- Karl, Duke of Schleswig-Holstein-Sonderburg-Glücksburg
- Archduke Karl Salvator of Austria
- Prince Karl Theodor of Bavaria
- Karl Theodor, Duke in Bavaria
- Grand Duke Kirill Vladimirovich of Russia
- Hans von Koester
- Grand Duke Konstantin Pavlovich of Russia
- Konstantin of Hohenlohe-Schillingsfürst
- Leopold I of Belgium
- Leopold II of Belgium
- Leopold IV, Duke of Anhalt
- Archduke Leopold Ferdinand of Austria
- Leopold II, Grand Duke of Tuscany
- Prince Leopold of Bavaria
- Louis III, Grand Duke of Hesse
- Louis IV, Grand Duke of Hesse
- Louis Antoine, Duke of Angoulême
- Ludwig I of Bavaria
- Ludwig II of Bavaria
- Ludwig III of Bavaria
- Archduke Ludwig Viktor of Austria
- Luís I of Portugal
- Luitpold, Prince Regent of Bavaria
- Maria Emanuel, Margrave of Meissen
- Prince Maximilian of Baden
- Maximilian, Hereditary Prince of Saxony
- Prince Maximilian of Saxony (1870–1951)
- Klemens von Metternich
- Grand Duke Michael Nikolaevich of Russia
- Milan I of Serbia
- Helmuth von Moltke the Elder
- Prince Moritz of Saxe-Altenburg
- Napoleon III
- Napoléon, Prince Imperial
- Nicholas Alexandrovich, Tsesarevich of Russia
- Oscar II
- Archduke Otto of Austria (1865–1906)
- Otto of Greece
- Duke Paul Frederick of Mecklenburg
- Pedro II of Brazil
- Pedro V of Portugal
- Peter II, Grand Duke of Oldenburg
- Prince Philipp of Saxe-Coburg and Gotha
- Duke Philipp of Württemberg
- Prince Philippe, Count of Flanders
- Hans von Plessen
- Joseph Radetzky von Radetz
- Archduke Rainer Ferdinand of Austria
- Duke Robert of Württemberg
- Albrecht von Roon
- Rudolf, Prince of Liechtenstein
- Rudolf, Crown Prince of Austria
- Prince Thomas, Duke of Genoa
- Umberto I of Italy
- Victor Emmanuel II of Italy
- Victor Emmanuel III of Italy
- Prince Waldemar of Prussia (1889–1945)
- Alfred von Waldersee
- Arthur Wellesley, 1st Duke of Wellington
- Wilhelm II, German Emperor
- Wilhelm Karl, Duke of Urach
- William I of Württemberg
- William I, German Emperor
- William II of Württemberg
- William III of the Netherlands
- William Ernest, Grand Duke of Saxe-Weimar-Eisenach
- Prince William of Baden (1829–1897)
- William, Prince of Hohenzollern
- Ferdinand von Zeppelin
