= Duchess Maria Isabella of Württemberg =

- Princess Johann Georg of Saxony
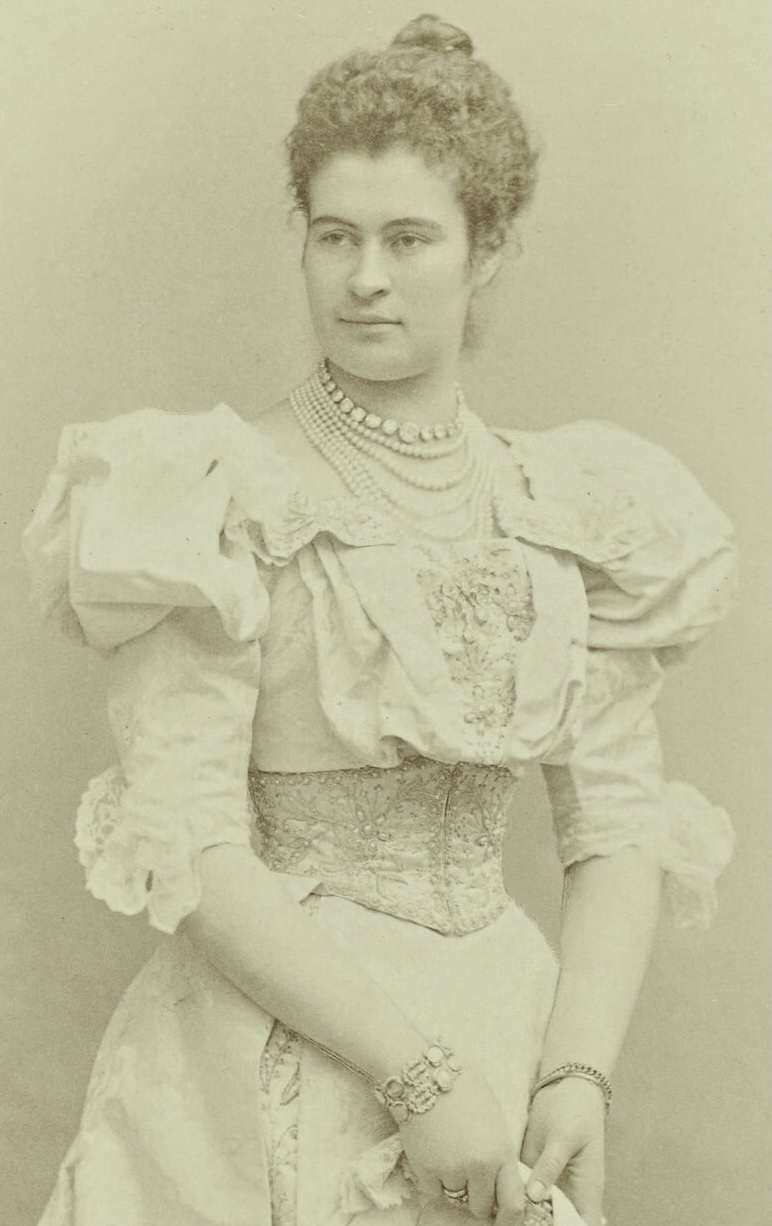
- Maria Isabella in 1898
- Born: 30 August 1871; Ort, Gmunden, Upper Austria, Austria-Hungary
- Died: 24 May 1904 (aged 32); Dresden, Kingdom of Saxony
- Burial: Katholische Hofkirche
- Spouse: Prince Johann Georg of Saxony (m. 1894)
Names
- German: Maria Isabella Philippine Theresia Mathilde Josephine
- House: Württemberg; Wettin
- Father: Duke Philipp of Württemberg
- Mother: Archduchess Maria Theresa of Austria

Duchess Maria Isabella of Württemberg (German: Maria Isabella Philippine Theresia Mathilde Josephine, Herzogin von Württemberg (30 August 1871 – 24 May 1904) was a member of the House of Württemberg and a Duchess of Württemberg by birth and a member of the House of Wettin and a Princess of Saxony through her marriage to Prince Johann Georg of Saxony.

== Family ==
Maria Isabella was the third child and youngest daughter of Duke Philipp of Württemberg and his wife Archduchess Maria Theresa of Austria.
