= Duke Philipp of Württemberg =

German prince (1838–1917)

- Philipp in 1904
- Born: 30 July 1838; Neuilly-sur-Seine, Kingdom of France
- Died: 11 October 1917 (aged 79); Stuttgart, Kingdom of Württemberg
- Spouse: Archduchess Maria Theresia of Austria (m. 1865)
- Issue: Albrecht, Duke of Württemberg; Duchess Marie Amélie; Maria Isabella, Princess of Saxony; Duke Robert; Duke Ulrich
Names
- Philipp Alexander Maria Ernst
- House: House of Württemberg
- Father: Duke Alexander of Württemberg
- Mother: Princess Marie d'Orléans

Philipp, Duke of Württemberg (30 July 1838 – 11 October 1917) was a German prince, head of the Roman Catholic cadet branch of the dynasty which ruled the Kingdom of Württemberg.

== Biography ==
He was the son of Duke Alexander and of Princess Marie d'Orléans, a daughter of Louis Philippe, King of the French. His mother died when he was a few months old, causing him to be raised by his grandparents in Paris. When he was ten, the royal family of France had to flee from France, staying in exile in Great Britain.

Duke Philipp became engaged to Duchess Sophie in Bavaria, sister of the Empress Elisabeth of Austria. But the Duke dissolved the engagement. He married Archduchess Maria Theresia and the couple had a splendid palace built at the Ringstrasse in Vienna. They moved in during 1865, but as Duchess Marie Therese never liked the palace it was sold to a banker and investor in 1871. Two years later, the renovated palace was opened on the occasion of the 1873 Vienna World's Fair as the Hotel Imperial. To this day it remains one of the most famous hotels in the world, and while renovated multiple times it has retained many elements of the original neo-Renaissance elements in the Ducal Palace.

After selling their palace in Vienna the couple bought a much smaller city palace named Strudelhof. They had a grand villa built at Altmünster on the shore of the Traunsee, not far away from the Emperor's summer residence at Bad Ischl. Around 1900, the couple moved to Stuttgart where they lived near their sons, at the Prinzenbau.

Upon the death of his cousin Duke Nicholas of Württemberg in 1903, he became heir presumptive to the royal throne of Württemberg until his death in 1917. But he was ten years older than King Wilhelm II of Württemberg, and so his eldest son Duke Albrecht (1865–1939) was considered and raised as the next king. On 29 November 1918 Württemberg's monarchy was abolished in the collapse of the German Empire following World War I, while his kinsman of the senior branch of the dynasty, Wilhelm II, was still king (and lived, after his abdication, until 2 October 1921).

== Marriage and issue ==
On 18 January 1865, Philip of Württemberg married Archduchess Maria Theresa of Austria, daughter of Archduke Albert, Duke of Teschen, and Princess Hildegard of Bavaria. They had five children:

- Albrecht, Duke of Württemberg (23 December 1865 – 31 October 1939) he married Archduchess Margarete Sophie of Austria on 24 January 1893. They had seven children.
- Duchess Marie Amélie of Württemberg (24 December 1865 – 16 December 1883) died at the age of 17.
- Duchess Maria Isabella of Württemberg (30 August 1871 – 24 May 1904) she married Prince Johann Georg of Saxony on 5 April 1894.
- Duke Robert of Württemberg (14 January 1873 – 12 April 1947) he married Archduchess Maria Immakulata of Austria on 29 October 1900.
- Duke Ulrich of Württemberg (13 June 1877 – 13 June 1944)

== Ducal branch of the royal dynasty ==
Philip of Württemberg belonged to the fifth branch (called the "Ducal branch") of the House of Württemberg, descended from the seventh son of Frederick II Eugene, Duke of Württemberg. On the extinction of the eldest branch in 1921, the Catholic ducal line remained the only dynastic branch of the formerly reigning family. The House of Württemberg's two morganatic branches - that of the Dukes of Teck (extinct in the male line in 1981), and of the Dukes of Urach - were genealogically senior to the Ducal branch, but had been ineligible to succeed to the throne.

Philip is the direct ancestor of the current claimant to the Kingdom of Württemberg: Wilhelm, Duke of Württemberg.

== Honours ==
- Kingdom of Württemberg:
  - Order of the Württemberg Crown, Grand Cross (1852)
  - Friedrich Order, Grand Cross
  - Wilhelm Cross with Swords and Crown (5 October 1916)
  - Officer's Service Decoration 1st Class
  - Jubilee Medal in Gold
- Austria-Hungary:
  - Order of the Golden Fleece, Knight (1865)
  - Order of Saint Stephen of Hungary, Grand Cross (1900)
  - Military Jubilee Medal
- Kingdom of Bavaria: Order of Saint Hubert, Knight (1893)
- Kingdom of Belgium: Order of Leopold, Grand Cordon (civil division) (21 July 1861)
- Duchy of Brunswick: Order of Henry the Lion, Grand Cross (1863)
- Grand Duchy of Mecklenburg-Schwerin: House Order of the Wendish Crown, Grand Cross with Crown in Ore
- Kingdom of Saxony: Order of the Rue Crown, Knight (1894)
- (Saxe-Coburg and Gotha) (Duchy of Saxe-Altenburg) (Saxe-Meiningen) Saxon Duchies: Ducal Saxe-Ernestine House Order, Grand Cross with Swords (1864) with Swords
- Spain: Royal and Distinguished Order of Charles III, Grand Cross (10 January 1884)

== Ancestry ==
Ancestors of Duke Philipp of Württemberg

8. Frederick II Eugene, Duke of Württemberg
4. Duke Alexander of Württemberg
9. Princess Friederike of Brandenburg-Schwedt
2. Duke Alexander of Württemberg
10. Francis, Duke of Saxe-Coburg-Saalfeld
5. Princess Antoinette of Saxe-Coburg-Saalfeld
11. Countess Augusta Reuss of Ebersdorf
1. Duke Philipp of Württemberg
12. Louis Philippe II, Duke of Orléans
6. Louis Philippe I of France
13. Louise Marie Adélaïde de Bourbon
3. Princess Marie of Orléans
14. Ferdinand I of the Two Sicilies
7. Princess Maria Amalia of Naples and Sicily
15. Archduchess Maria Carolina of Austria
