= Princess Hildegard of Bavaria =

Duchess of Teschen (1825–1864)

Hildegard of Bavaria
- Archduchess Albert of Austria; Duchess of Teschen
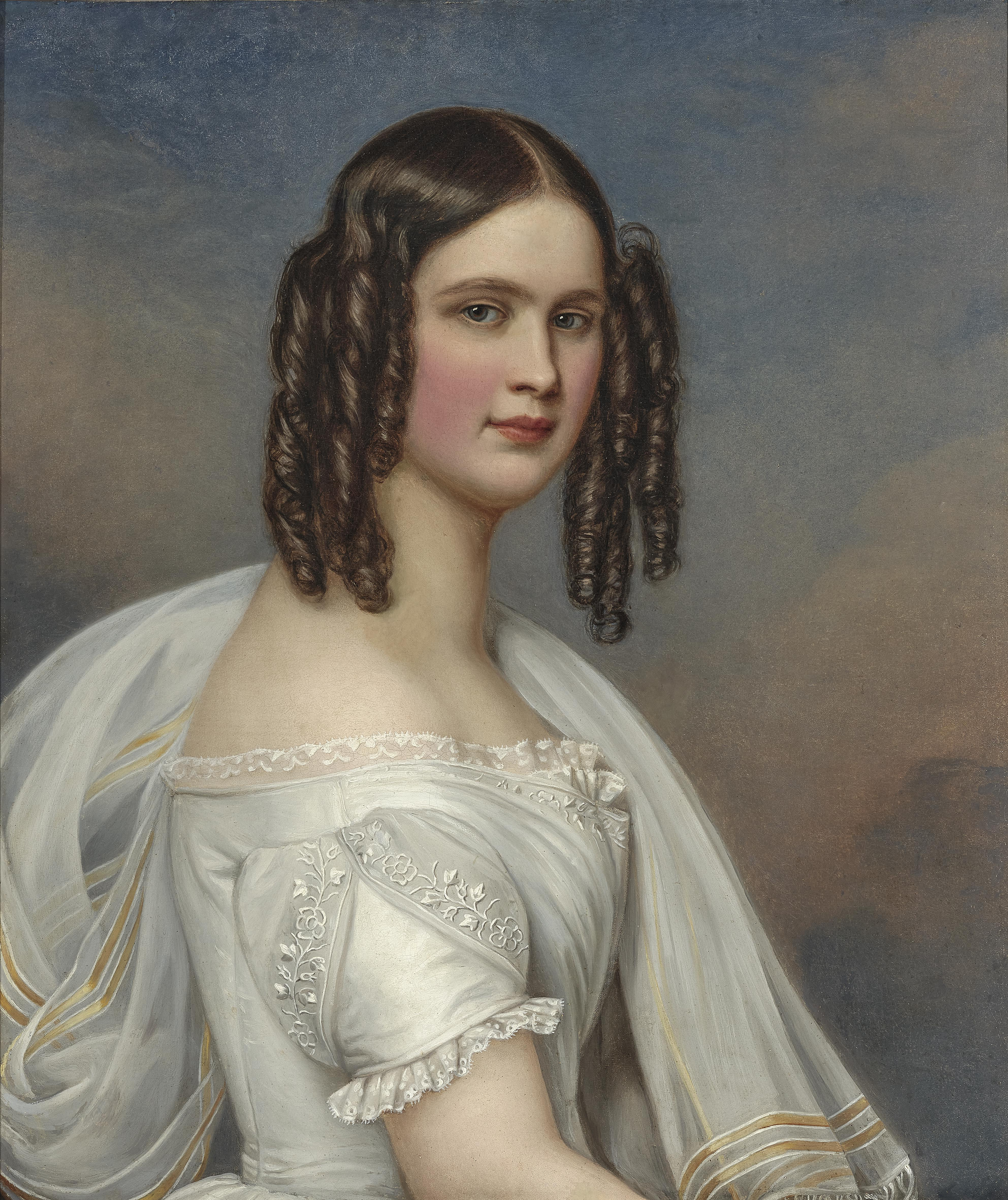
- Portrait by Joseph Karl Stieler, 1844
- Born: 10 June 1825; Würzburg
- Died: 2 April 1864 (aged 38); Vienna
- Burial: Imperial Crypt
- Spouse: Archduke Albert, Duke of Teschen (m. 1844)
- Issue: Maria Theresa, Duchess of Württemberg; Archduke Karl; Archduchess Mathilda
Names
- Hildegard Luise Charlotte Theresia Friederike
- House: Wittelsbach
- Father: Ludwig I of Bavaria
- Mother: Therese of Saxe-Hildburghausen

Princess Hildegard of Bavaria (German: Hildegard Luise Charlotte Theresia Friederike von Bayern; 10 June 1825 – 2 April 1864) was the seventh child and fourth daughter of Ludwig I of Bavaria and Therese of Saxe-Hildburghausen.

== Life ==
=== Marriage ===
On 1 May 1844 in Munich, Hildegard married Archduke Albert of Austria, eldest son of Archduke Charles, Duke of Teschen and Princess Henrietta of Nassau-Weilburg. She thereafter became known as Archduchess Hildegard. She and her husband had 3 children:

Name	Birth	Death	Notes
Archduchess Maria Theresa of Austria	15 July 1845	8 October 1927	married Philipp, Duke of Württemberg (1838–1917)
Archduke Karl of Austria	3 January 1847	19 July 1848	died of smallpox at an early age.
Archduchess Mathilda of Austria	25 January 1849	6 June 1867	died in an accident at the age of 18.

During her stay in Munich for the funeral of her brother King Maximilian II in March 1864, Archduchess Hildegard became ill with a lung inflammation and pleurisy, and died in Vienna.
