= Marie of Hesse (disambiguation) =

Marie of Hesse was Empress consort of Russia as the wife of Emperor Alexander II.

Marie of Hesse may also refer to:

== Princesses by birth ==
- Marie Louise of Hesse-Kassel (1688–1765), daughter of Charles I, Landgrave of Hesse-Kassel; Princess of Orange (1709–1711) by marriage to John William Friso, Prince of Orange, and regent of the Netherlands (1711–1730).
- Marie of Hesse-Kassel (1767–1852), daughter of Prince Charles of Hesse-Kassel; Queen of Denmark (1808–1839) and Norway (1808–1814) by marriage to Frederick VI of Denmark and Norway.
- Princess Marie of Hesse-Kassel (1796–1880), daughter of Prince Frederick of Hesse-Kassel; Grand Duchess of Mecklenburg-Strelitz (1817–1860) by marriage to Grand Duke George.
- Princess Marie of Hesse and by Rhine (1874–1878), daughter of Grand Duke Louis IV and Princess Alice of the United Kingdom; died in childhood of diphtheria.

== Consorts ==
- Maria Amalia of Courland (1653–1711), daughter of Jacob Kettler; wife of Landgrave Charles I of Hesse-Kassel and mother of King Frederick I of Sweden.
- Princess Mary of Great Britain (1723–1772), daughter of King George II of Great Britain and Caroline of Brandenburg-Ansbach; wife of Landgrave Frederick II of Hesse-Kassel and mother of Elector William I.
- Princess Marie of Württemberg (1818–1888), daughter of Duke Eugene of Württemberg; wife of Landgrave Charles II of Hesse-Philippsthal and mother of Landgrave Ernst.
- Maria von Hanau-Hořowitz (1839–1917), morganatic daughter of Frederick William I, Elector of Hesse; wife of Prince William of Hesse-Philippsthal-Barchfeld and divorced in 1872.

== See also ==
- Princess Maria (disambiguation)
- Princess Marie (disambiguation)
- Princess Mary (disambiguation)
- Maria (name)
- Mary (name)
