= May (disambiguation) =

May is the fifth month of the year.

May, MAY or may can also refer to:

== Arts and entertainment ==
- May (film), a 2002 drama/horror film
- May (painting), a series of 17–18th-century paintings
- "May" (poem), a poem by Dafydd ap Gwilym
- Máj, a 1836 poem by Karel Hynek Mácha
- "May" (song), a 2000 song by B'z

== Persons and fictional characters ==
- May (given name), including a list of people and fictional characters with the name
- May (surname), including a list of people with the surname
- May (actress), Burmese actress, singer and model (born 1991)
- May (singer), South Korean singer (born 1982)
- May (governor), ancient Egyptian official under Pharaoh Thutmose III
- May (noble), ancient Egyptian official under Pharaoh Akhenaten

== Places ==
=== United States ===
- May, California, a former settlement
- May, Idaho, an unincorporated community
- May, Missouri, an unincorporated community
- May, Oklahoma, a small town
- May, Texas, an unincorporated community
- May, West Virginia, an unincorporated community
- May Township (disambiguation)

=== Elsewhere ===
- May, Russia, several rural localities in Russia
- Isle of May, Scotland
- May District, Kazakhstan, Pavlodar Region
- May district, Laos, Phongsaly Province
- May-sur-Orne, France
- Cape May (disambiguation)
- 348 May, an asteroid

== Transportation ==
- Maybole railway station, Scotland, National Rail station code MAY
- Maysville station, Kentucky, United States, Amtrak station code MAY
- Clarence A. Bain Airport, Mangrove Cay, Bahamas, airport code MAY

== Other uses ==
- Baron May, a title in the Peerage of the United Kingdom
- may, an English modal verb
- May people, an ethnic group of Vietnam
- May language, a language spoken by the May people of Vietnam
- Ilyushin Il-38, a Soviet and Russian plane with the NATO reporting name May
- May (spider), a genus of African huntsman spiders
- May, another name for Crataegus monogyna, a species of plant better known as hawthorn
- May Company (disambiguation)

== See also ==
- May Queen (disambiguation)
