= Princess Marie =

Princess Marie may refer to:

- Princess Marie of Baden (disambiguation), various princesses of the House of Zähringen
- Princess Marie Aglaë of Liechtenstein (1940-2021), wife and cousin of Prince Hans Adam II of Liechtenstein
- Princess Marie Bonaparte (1882–1962), French psychoanalyst
- Princess Marie of Denmark (born 1976), second wife of Prince Joachim of Denmark; known as Marie Cavallier before the wedding
- Princess Marie d'Orleans (disambiguation), various French princesses
- Princess Marie of Edinburgh (1875–1938), Queen of Romania
- Princess Marie Isabelle of Orléans (1848–1919), Countess of Paris
- Princess Marie Louise of Bulgaria (born 1933), daughter of Tsar Boris III and Tsaritsa Ioanna
- Princess Marie Louise of Schleswig-Holstein (1872–1956), member of the British Royal Family
- Princess Marie of Hanover (1849–1904), great-granddaughter of King George III
- Princess Marie of Hesse and by Rhine (1874–1878), youngest daughter of Princess Alice of the United Kingdom and Ludwig IV, the Grand Duke of Hesse
- Princess Marie of Hornes (1704–1736), daughter of Thomas Bruce, 3rd Earl of Elgin and Charlotte Jacqueline d' Argenteau, comtesse d'Esneux
- Princess Marie of Saxe-Weimar-Eisenach (disambiguation), multiple people

== See also ==
- Princess Marie-Adélaïde of Savoy (1685–1712), Princess of Savoy and Sardinia, eldest daughter of Victor Amadeus II of Sardinia
- Princess Marie-Antoinette of Parma (1774–1841), Princess of Parma, daughter of Duke Ferdinand I of Parma
- Marie-Chantal, Crown Princess of Greece, wife of Pavlos, Crown Prince of Greece
- Princess Marie-Christine of Belgium (born 1951) daughter of King Leopold III of the Belgians
- Princess Mary (disambiguation)
- Princess Louise-Marie (disambiguation)
- Princess Maria (disambiguation)
