= Princess Maria =

Princess Maria may refer to:

- Princess Laetitia Maria of Belgium, Archduchess of Austria-Este (born 2003)
- Princess Maria Antonia of Naples and Sicily (1784–1806), Princess of Asturias
- Princess Maria Beatrice of Savoy (born 1943), youngest daughter of Italy's last king and his queen
- Princess Maria Clotilde of Savoy (1843–1911), Italian princess
- Princess Maria Francesca of Savoy (1914–2000), Italian princess
- Princess Maria Gabriella of Savoy (born 1940), daughter of Umberto II
- Princess Maria of Greece and Denmark (1876–1940), 5th child of George I of Greece and Olga Konstantinovna of Russia
- Princess Maria Josepha of Saxony (1867–1944), mother of Emperor Karl I of Austria
- Princess Maria Laura of Belgium, Archduchess of Austria-Este (born 1988)
- Princess Maria Louise, a character in the fictional anime Mobile Fighter G Gundam
- Princess Maria Manuela of Asturias (1527–1545), Portuguese princess
- Princess Maria of Romania (born 1964), youngest daughter and fifth child of Michael I and Queen Anne
- Princess Maria of Romania (1870-1874), only child of Carol I of Romania and Elisabeth of Wied
- Princess Maria Pia of Bourbon-Parma (born 1934), oldest daughter of Umberto II of Italy and Marie-José of Belgium
- Princess Maria Tatiana of Yugoslavia (born 1957), first child of Prince Andrej of Yugoslavia and Princess Christina of Hesse-Kassel
- Princess Maria Teresa of Bourbon-Two Sicilies (1867–1909), child of Lodovico, Count of Trani and Mathilde Ludovika

== See also ==
- Princess Maria-Esmeralda
- Princess Marie (disambiguation)
- Princess Mary (disambiguation)
- Queen Mary (disambiguation)
