= Mary of Great Britain =

Mary of Great Britain may refer to:

- Mary II (1662–1694), queen regnant of England, Scotland and Ireland
- Princess Mary of Great Britain (1723–1772), second-youngest daughter of King George II
- Mary of Teck (1867–1953), queen consort, queen dowager and queen mother of the United Kingdom
- Princess Mary, Duchess of Gloucester and Edinburgh (1776–1857), fourth daughter of King George III
- Mary, Princess Royal and Countess of Harewood (1897–1965), only daughter of King George V

== See also ==
- Princess Mary (disambiguation)
- Queen Mary (disambiguation)
