= Maria Anna of Saxony =

Maria Anna of Saxony can refer to:

- Maria Anna Sophia of Saxony (1728–1797), wife of Maximilian III Joseph, Elector of Bavaria
- Princess Maria Anna of Saxony (1799–1832), Grand Duchess of Tuscany
- Princess Marie Anne of Saxe-Altenburg (1864–1918), Princess of Schaumburg-Lippe

== See also ==
- Anna of Saxony (disambiguation)
- Marie of Saxony (disambiguation)
  - Princess Marie of Saxe-Altenburg (disambiguation)
  - Princess Marie of Saxe-Weimar-Eisenach (disambiguation)
  - Maria Amalia of Saxony (1724–1760), Queen of Naples and Sicily (1738-1759), Queen of Spain (1759-1760)
  - Marie of Romania, née Marie of Saxe-Coburg-Gotha (1875-1938), Queen of Romania
