= Princess Mathilde =

Princess Mathilde may refer to:

- Princess Mathilde Caroline of Bavaria (1813–1862)
- Princess Mathilde Sophie of Oettingen-Oettingen and Oettingen-Spielberg (1816–1886)
- Mathilde Bonaparte (1820–1904)
- Princess Mathilde of Saxony (born 1863) (1863–1933)
- Princess Mathilde of Bavaria (1877–1906)
- Princess Mathilde, Duchess of Brabant (born 1973)
- Princess Mathilde of Schönburg-Waldenburg (1826–1914)
