= Maria Regina =

Maria Regina may refer to:

- Maria Regina (or Maria R.), a latinate form of address for queens named Maria; see Queen Mary (disambiguation)
- an art historians' synonym for the iconic image of Mary enthroned, with or without the child Jesus; see Maestà

== See also ==
- Regina Maria (disambiguation)
