= Mary, Duchess of York =

Mary, Duchess of York may refer to:

- Mary of Modena (1658–1718), known as Duchess of York between 1673 and 1685
- Mary of Teck (1867–1953), known as Duchess of York between 1893 and 1901

== See also ==
- Princess Mary (disambiguation)
