= Regina Maria =

Regina Maria may refer to:

- Regina Maria, a latinate form of address for queens named Maria, see Queen Maria (disambiguation)
- Regina Maria (Romanian frigate)
- Regina Maria, Soroca, a village and commune in Moldova
- Regina Maria, former name of Semionovca, a village in Mingir Commune, Hînceşti district, Moldova
- Regina Maria, former name of Avram Iancu Commune, Bihor County, Romania
- Regina Maria, former name of Horia Commune, Tulcea County, Romania

== See also ==
- Regia Marina, the Royal Italian Navy
- Maria Regina (disambiguation)
