= Queen's Hospital (disambiguation) =

Queen's Hospital is a hospital in Romford, London. Queen's Hospital or Queens Hospital can also refer to:

- The Queen's Hospital, a former hospital in Birmingham, England now the site of Birmingham Accident Hospital
- Queen's Hospital, now Queen Mary's Hospital, Sidcup in Sidcup, south east London
- Queen Elizabeth Hospital for Children, originally Queen's Hospital for Children, a former hospital in Tower Hamlets, London
- Queens Hospital Center in Queens, New York

== See also ==
- Queen's Medical Centre in Nottingham, England
- The Queen's Medical Center in Honolulu, Hawaii
- List of hospitals in Queens, New York
- Queen Elizabeth Hospital (disambiguation)
- Queen Mary's Hospital (disambiguation)
