= Prince Maximilian of Saxony (1870–1951) =

Saxon prince (1870–1951)

Prince Maximilian
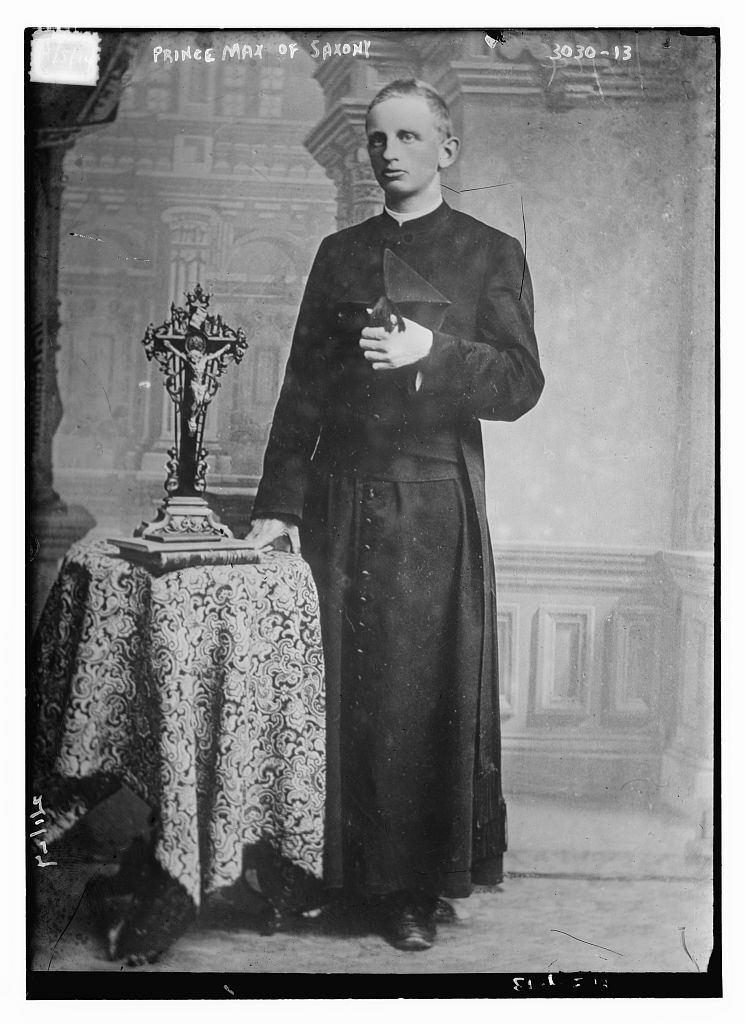
- Maximilian in 1915
- Born: 17 November 1870; Dresden, Kingdom of Saxony, North German Confederation
- Died: 12 January 1951 (aged 80); Fribourg, Canton of Fribourg, Switzerland
Names
- German: Maximilian Wilhelm August Albert Karl Gregor Odo; English: Maximilian William Augustus Albert Charles Gregory Odo
- House: Wettin
- Father: George of Saxony
- Mother: Infanta Maria Anna of Portugal
- Religion: Catholicism

Prince Maximilian William Augustus Albert Charles Gregory Odo of Saxony, Duke of Saxony (German: Maximilian Wilhelm August Albert Karl Gregor Odo; 17 November 1870 – 12 January 1951) was a member of the Albertine branch of the House of Wettin and a Catholic priest.

== Early life ==
Maximilian Wilhelm August Albert Karl Gregor Odo of Saxony was born in Dresden, the capital of the Kingdom of Saxony. He was the seventh of the eight children of Prince George of Saxony and his wife Infanta Maria Anna of Portugal. He was born with the titles Prince and Duke of Saxony, with the style Royal Highness. Amongst his siblings was the last Saxon king Frederick Augustus III and Princess Maria Josepha mother of the last Austrian Emperor Charles I.

== Priesthood ==
On 26 July 1896, despite initial opposition from his family, Prince Maximilian decided to study for the priesthood and was subsequently ordained a Catholic priest. He renounced his claim to the throne of Saxony on entering the priesthood and also expressed a determination to refuse the apanage that he was entitled to from the Kingdom of Saxony. According to his sister-in-law, Louise "Max was in a terrible plight when he appeared in the family circle. His hair and nails had grown beyond any possible conception; his soutane shone with grease and hard wear; his toes protruded through his shoes. In fact, he looked most unlike a prince or a priest. I was quite horrified, and I asked him whether he had brought any luggage. "No," he replied; "I've only a toothbrush, and after I brush my teeth with it I use it for my hair!""

== Professor ==
In January 1899 Prince Maximilian graduated Doctor of Theology from the University of Würzburg. After working as a pastor at a church in Nuremberg, on 21 August 1900 Prince Maximilian accepted the post of Professor of Canon Law at the University of Fribourg.

In late 1910 Prince Maximilian caused controversy by publishing an article in an ecclesiastical periodical on the union of the Eastern and Roman churches. Prince Maximilian argued that the six dogmas should be waived in order to facilitate the return of the Eastern to the Catholic Church. Consequently, upon the article he went to see Pope Pius X to explain, and as a result of the meeting agreed to retract the article and signed a declaration acknowledging errors in it. It was announced that he had renewed his full and unconditional adhesion to the doctrines of the Catholic Church.

== War ==
During the First World War Prince Maximilian served as an Army chaplain and in this capacity he attended to wounded soldiers, gave unction to the dying and said mass while under shell fire. He was liked by the French prisoners of war as he also dedicated himself to their welfare. He also used the international bureau in Geneva to send word to the families of the French prisoners.

Following the German Empire's defeat in the war his brother King Frederick Augustus III was forced to abdicate as the monarchy was abolished.

== Death ==
Prince Maximilian died in Fribourg, Switzerland, as the last surviving grandchild of Queen Maria II and King Fernando II of Portugal, and the last great-grandchild of Pedro IV of Portugal & I of Brazil.

== Honours ==
- Kingdom of Saxony: Knight of the Order of the Rue Crown
- Kingdom of Prussia: Knight of the Order of the Black Eagle
- Baden: Knight of the House Order of Fidelity, 1908
- Kingdom of Bavaria: Knight of the Order of St. Hubert, 1898
- Saxe-Weimar-Eisenach: Grand Cross of the Order of the White Falcon, 1890
- Austria-Hungary: Grand Cross of the Order of St. Stephen, 1891

== Ancestry ==
Ancestors of Prince Maximilian of Saxony (1870–1951)

8. Maximilian, Hereditary Prince of Saxony
4. John of Saxony
9. Princess Carolina of Parma
2. George of Saxony
10. Maximilian I Joseph of Bavaria
5. Princess Amalie Auguste of Bavaria
11. Princess Caroline of Baden
1. Prince Maximilian of Saxony
12. Prince Ferdinand of Saxe-Coburg and Gotha
6. Fernando II of Portugal
13. Princess Maria Antonia Koháry of Csábrág and Szitnya
3. Infanta Maria Ana of Portugal
14. Pedro I of Brazil and IV of Portugal
7. Maria II of Portugal
15. Archduchess Leopoldina of Austria
