= QMH =

QMH may stand for:

- Queens Moat Houses
- Queen Mary's Hospital (disambiguation), various hospitals
- Queen Mary Hospital station, Hong Kong, MTR station code QMH
