= May Company =

May Company may refer to several American businesses:

- The May Department Stores Company, a defunct retail company acquired by Federated Department Stores in 2006
  - May Company California, a defunct California department store that merged with J. W. Robinson's to create Robinsons-May
  - May Company Ohio, a defunct Ohio department store which was merged into Kaufmann's

== See also ==
- May Company Building (disambiguation)
