= Princess Mathilde of Saxony =

Saxon princess (1863–1933)

Princess Mathilde
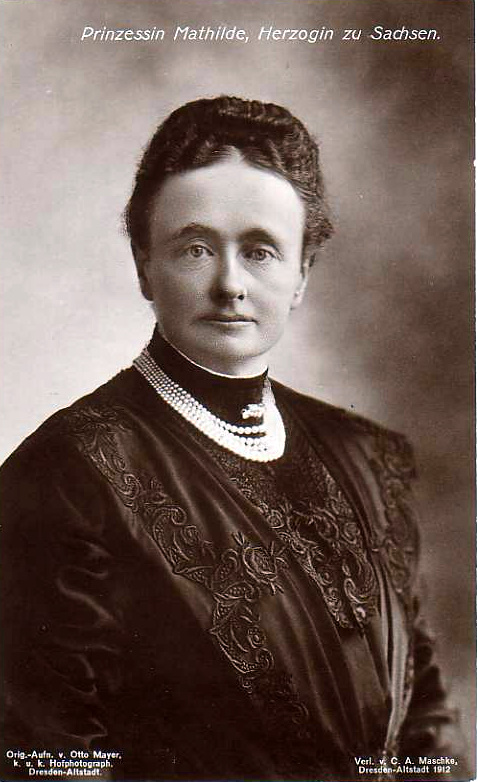
- Princess Mathilde in 1912.
- Born: 19 March 1863; Dresden, Saxony
- Died: 27 March 1933 (aged 70); Dresden, Saxony, Germany
- Burial: Katholische Hofkirche, Dresden, Germany
Names
- Mathilde Marie Auguste Viktorie Leopoldine Karoline Luise Franziska Josepha
- House: Wettin
- Father: George of Saxony
- Mother: Maria Anna of Portugal

Princess Mathilde of Saxony, Duchess of Saxony (19 March 1863 – 27 March 1933) was the third child and third-eldest daughter of George of Saxony and Infanta Maria Anna of Portugal. She was an elder sister of the Kingdom of Saxony's last king, Frederick Augustus III of Saxony.

== Life ==
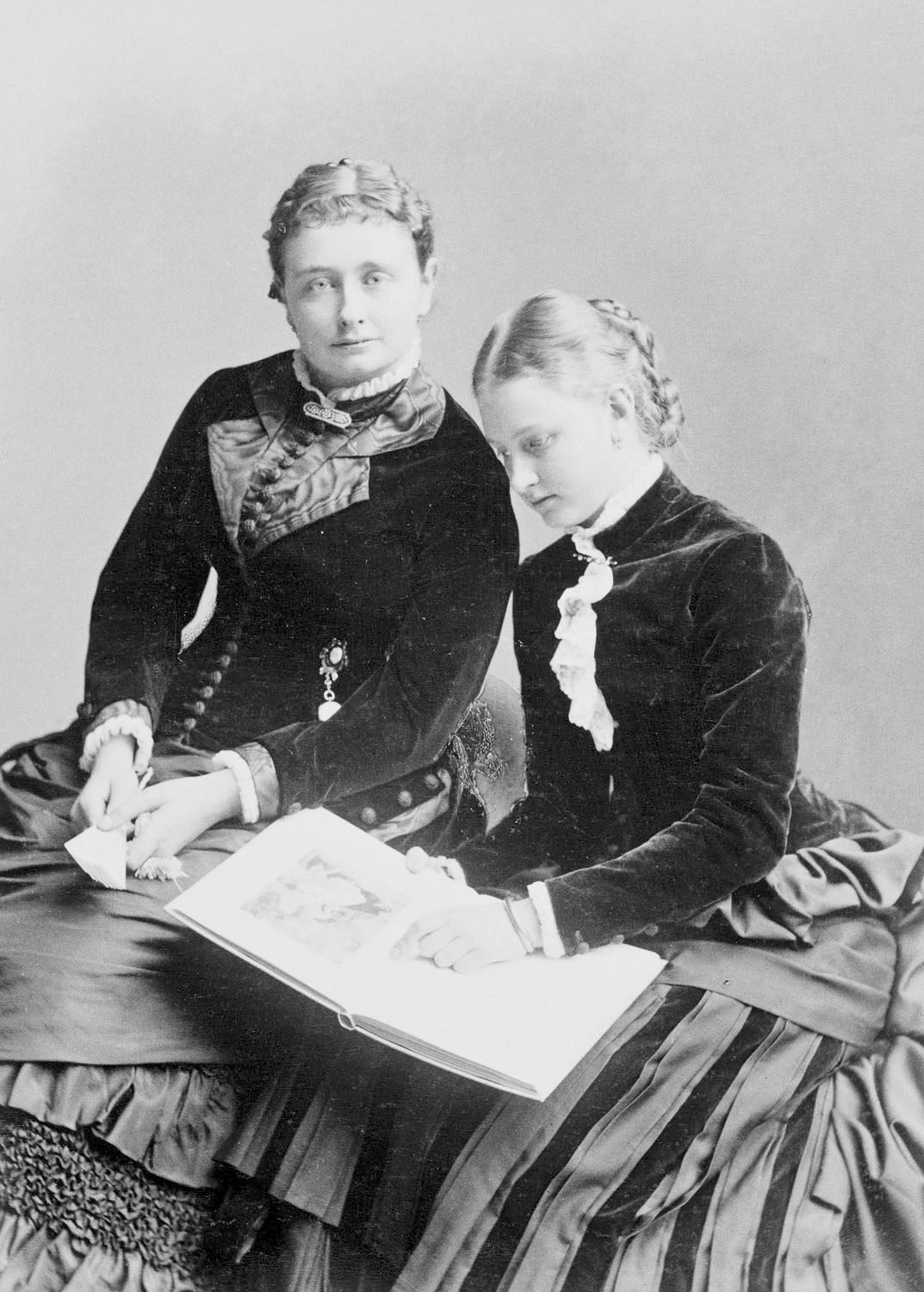
Mathilde with her sister Maria Josepha in c. 1883

As a young girl, Mathilde was quiet and gentle, but she was not especially good-looking. Her father, George of Saxony, had planned a marriage between Mathilde and Archduke Rudolf, Crown Prince of Austria, Hungary, and Bohemia, however Rudolf rejected this arrangement and instead married Princess Stéphanie of Belgium.

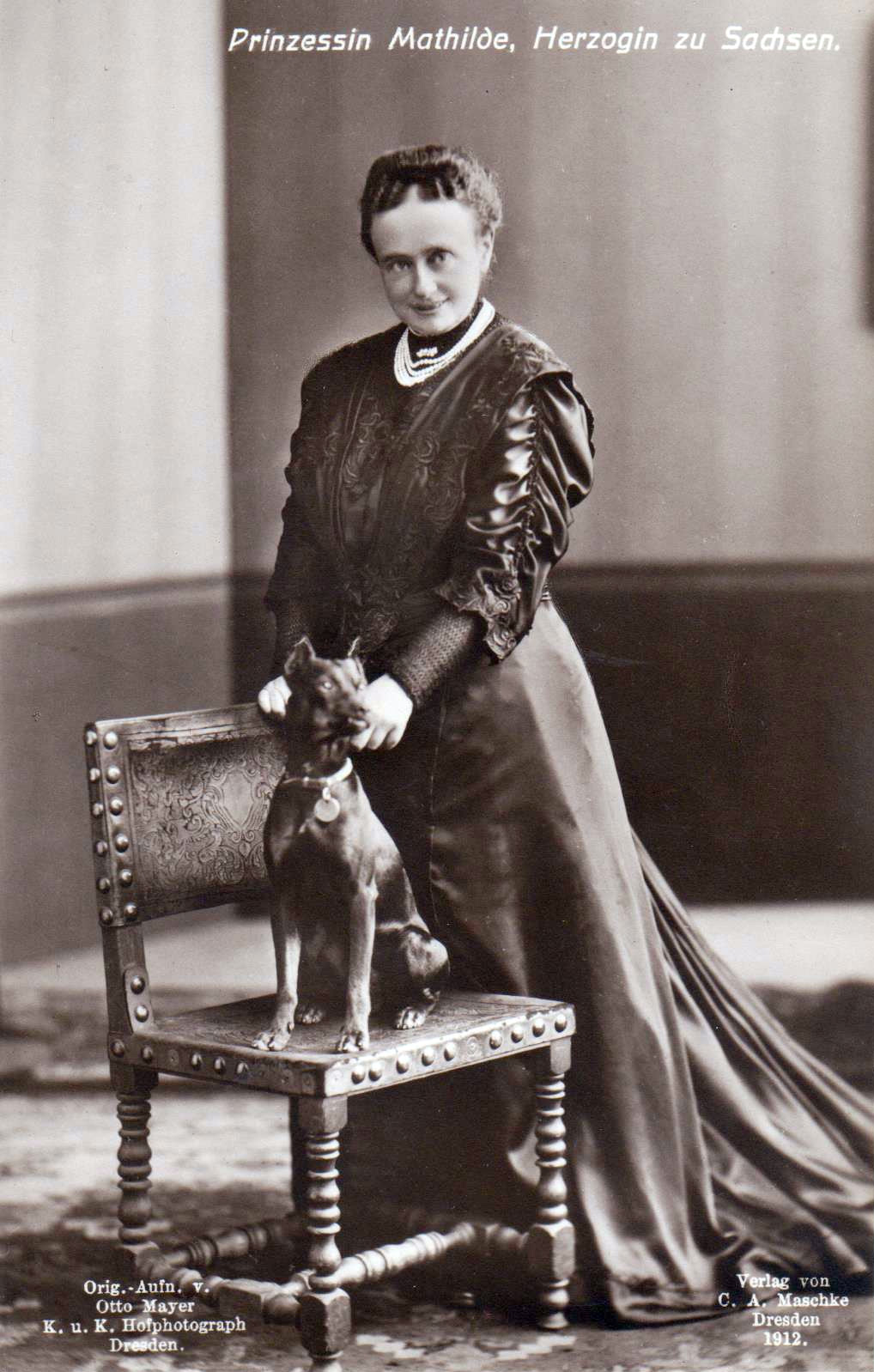
Mathilde in 1912

It was then agreed that Mathilde would marry a nephew of Emperor Franz Joseph I and the heir presumptive to the Austro-Hungarian throne, Archduke Franz Ferdinand. However, Franz Ferdinand rejected this arrangement. Dynastic relations between the Saxon royal family and the Habsburgs were once again strained when Franz Ferdinand chose to marry (morganatically) Sophie, Countess Chotek von Wognin. Relations between the two nations improved only when Mathilde's younger sister Maria Josepha married her second cousin, Archduke Otto Franz of Austria.

Mathilde became embittered by these rejections and turned critical and waspish; she also turned to alcohol to ease her unhappiness, acquiring the nickname "Schnapps-Mathilde" for obvious reasons. She made life difficult for other members of the royal family, and as a consequence was the least popular of the family by a wide margin among the people of Saxony.

She was a talented painter and took lessons from the artist Alfred Diethe from 1890 to 1901. Some of her paintings, mainly landscapes and scenes of court life in Pillnitz, were made into prints. Others appeared on postcards, which were sold to raise money for charity.

Mathilde died unmarried on 27 March 1933 at the age of 70. She was interred in the New Tomb of the Katholische Hofkirche in Dresden.

== Legacy ==
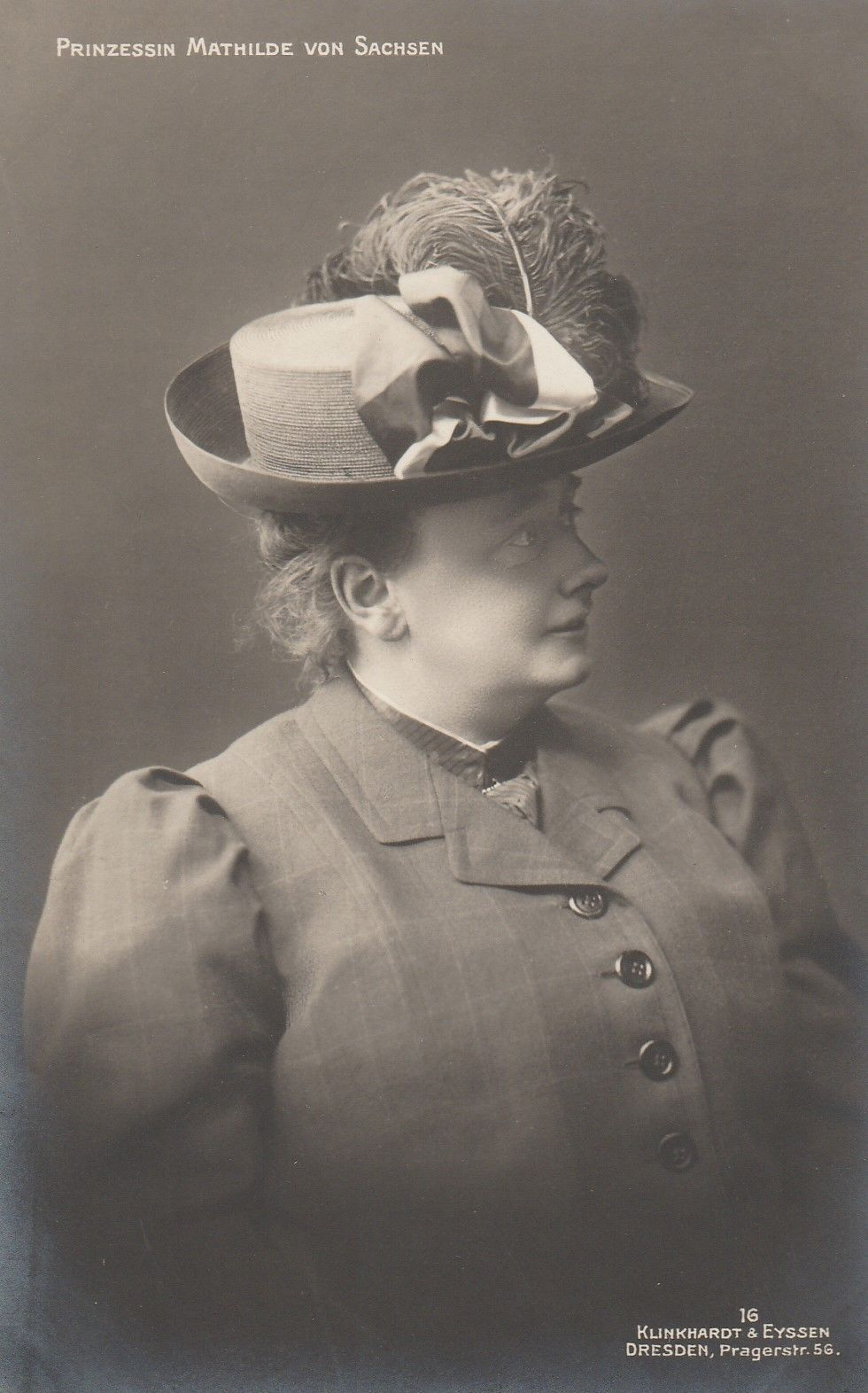
Mathilde in the 1910s

She had an extremely antagonistic relationship with her sister-in-law, Archduchess Louise of Austria, who married her brother King Frederick Augustus III in 1891 (they divorced twelve years later). In her 1911 memoirs, Louise describes Mathilde:

My sister-in-law is a very extraordinary woman. We were never in sympathy and she made no pretence of even tolerating me, she does not possess a particle of femininity, but likes to be thought an esprit fort far above every one in intellectual attainments. She professes to regard men with complete indifference, and used to remark, "It is nothing to me whether a man is old or young, ugly or handsome."

== Ancestry ==
Ancestors of Princess Mathilde of Saxony

8. Maximilian, Hereditary Prince of Saxony
4. John, King of Saxony
9. Princess Carolina of Parma
2. George, King of Saxony
10. Maximilian I Joseph of Bavaria
5. Princess Amalie Auguste of Bavaria
11. Princess Caroline of Baden
1. Princess Mathilde of Saxony
12. Prince Ferdinand of Saxe-Coburg and Gotha
6. Ferdinand II of Portugal
13. Princess Maria Antonia Koháry of Csábrág and Szitnya
3. Infanta Maria Ana of Portugal
14. Pedro I of Brazil and IV of Portugal
7. Maria II of Portugal
15. Archduchess Leopoldina of Austria
