= Mary I (disambiguation) =

Mary I (1516–1558) was Queen of England and Ireland 1553–1558.

Mary I may also refer to:

- Mary I, Countess of Menteith (13th century)
- Mary, Queen of Hungary (1371–1395)
- Mary, Duchess of Burgundy (1457–1482)
- Mary, Queen of Scots (1542–1587), Mary I of Scotland
- Maria I of Portugal (1734–1816)
- Mary Immaculate College or Mary I, a college in Limerick, Ireland

== See also ==
- Queen Mary (disambiguation)
