= May Queen (disambiguation) =

The May Queen is a personification of May Day.

May Queen or The May Queen may also refer to:

- Marie-José of Belgium (1906–2001), queen consort of Umberto II, King of Italy, and nicknamed the May Queen
- May Queen (barque), wrecked in New Zealand in 1888
- May Queen (TV series), a 2012 South Korean melodrama
- "May Queen", the fourteenth track of the album Whip-Smart by Liz Phair
- "The May Queen", the first track of the album Carry Fire by Robert Plant
- The May Queen, a poem by Alfred Lord Tennyson in his 1842 collection Poems

== See also ==
- May (disambiguation)
- Queen (disambiguation)
- Maqueen Letsoha-Mathae (born 1969), 8th Premier of the Free State (in South Africa)
- Queen Mary (disambiguation)
  - Mary of Teck (1867–1953), queen consort of George V, King of the United Kingdom, and informally known as May
- Queen Maya, mother of the Buddha
- Queen Maya of Silla, consort of Jinpyeong, King of Silla
- Umberto II, King of Italy (1904–1983; r. 1946–1946), nicknamed the May King
