= Infanta Maria Ana of Portugal (1843–1884) =

Princess George of Saxony

- Princess George of Saxony
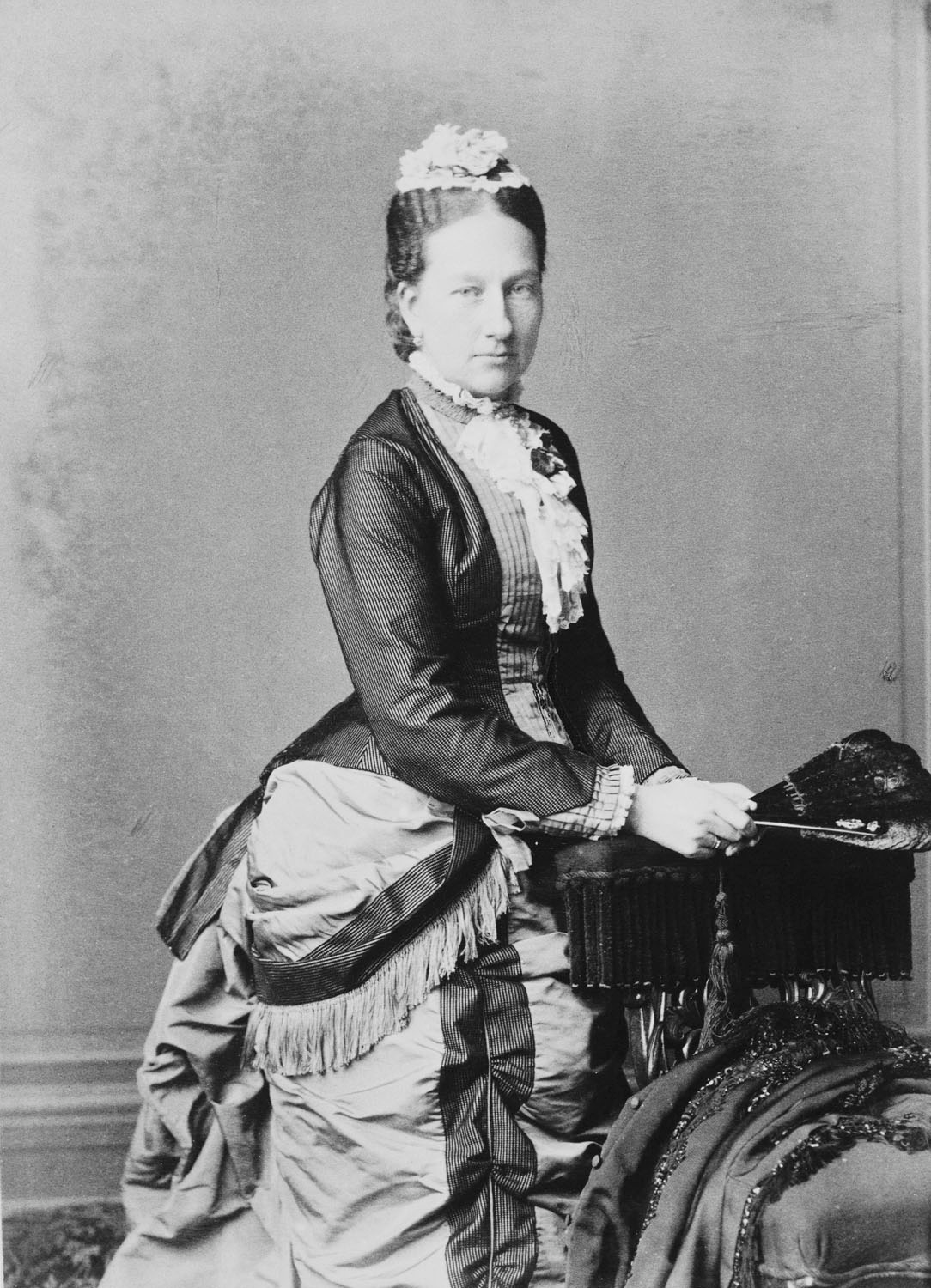
- Portrait, c. 1883
- Born: 21 August 1843; Necessidades Palace, Lisbon, Portugal
- Died: 5 February 1884 (aged 40); Dresden, Saxony
- Burial: Katholische Hofkirche
- Spouse: George of Saxony (m. 1859)
- Issue: Princess Marie Johanna; Princess Elisabeth; Princess Mathilde; Frederick Augustus III of Saxony; Maria Josepha, Archduchess of Austria; Prince Johann Georg; Prince Maximilian; Prince Albert
Names
- Portuguese: Maria Ana Fernanda Leopoldina Micaela Rafaela Gabriela Carlota Antónia Júlia Vitória Praxedes Francisca de Assis Gonzaga de Bragança e Saxe-Coburgo-Gota
- House: Braganza
- Father: Ferdinand of Saxe-Coburg and Gotha
- Mother: Maria II of Portugal

Infanta Maria Ana of Portugal (Maria Ana Fernanda Leopoldina Micaela Rafaela Gabriela Carlota Antónia Júlia Vitória Praxedes Francisca de Assis Gonzaga; 21 August 1843 – 5 February 1884), also known as Maria Ana of Braganza, was a Portuguese infanta (princess). Maria was the eldest surviving daughter of Queen Maria II of Portugal and her King consort, Ferdinand II of Portugal, a member of the House of Braganza.

== Life ==
After her mother's death in 1853, when Maria Anna was just ten-years-old, she became the leading lady of the court, until her eldest brother, Pedro V of Portugal, married Princess Stephanie of Hohenzollern-Sigmaringen in May 1858. Although in the early stages of their acquaintance, the two sisters-in-law had a good relationship; in a letter written in 1859 to Albert, Prince Consort, when Stephanie was already dead, King Pedro mentions that his sister made unflattering comments regarding his wife "because of her feminine vanity caused by a lower status (...)".

The relationship between the sisters-in-law seems to have had its ups and downs since Stephanie's arrival in May 1858 and Maria Anna's wedding in May 1859. The Queen wrote about her sister-in-law: "She is, in every respect, the one who is more like Pedro (...)", "She is a charming person, good, generous, remarkably sensible for her age, with no trace of selfishness, respected and loved by all of us (...) George of Saxony has discovered a true gem. She is happy and loves him, but she cannot talk about the moment in which she will leave her family without crying. What is certain is that she will leave a terrible emptiness behind". Maria Ana's brother, Pedro, also claims during this time that his sister is "the pearl of our family circle", in a letter to Prince Albert.

=== Marriage ===
She married in Lisbon at the Belém Palace on 11 May 1859 Prince George of Saxony (1832–1904), second son of King Johann I of Saxony, a kinsman from the Catholic Albertine branch of her father's Wettin dynasty. Queen Stephanie tried to organize a brilliant ceremony, but, in the end, the wedding was quiet and went unnoticed in both Portugal and Saxony. The newly-weds spent their first days as a married couple at Belém Palace. During their short stay in Portugal after the ceremony, Prince George left a poor impression with the Portuguese royal family, as he "barely talked to the bride" and did not attend a theatre performance to which he had been invited. During that same performance, 15-year-old Maria Anna was seen crying. The couple left to Saxony on May 14. Maria Anna was not allowed to take Portuguese ladies-in-waiting with her and was only accompanied by her brother Luís in the journey. Pedro V wrote the following regarding the wedding: "the wedding of my sister to Prince George of Saxony was celebrated with more pomp than happiness. The former is followed by a regretful fate, as he left no sympathies and people who met him often left with a poor impression."

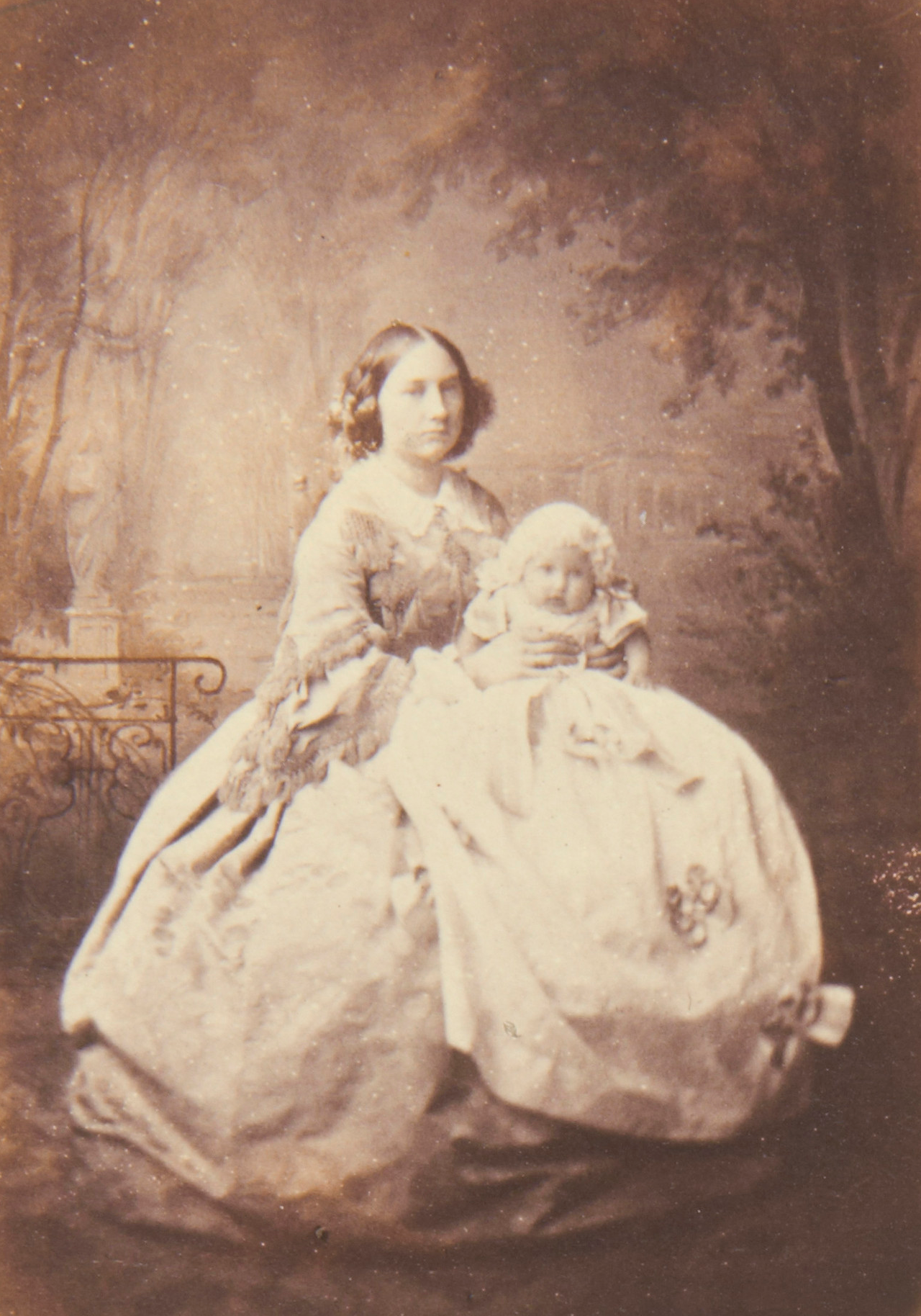
Princess Maria Ana and her infant daughter, Princess Marie Johanna of Saxony

The marriage was not a happy one, according to Historian Eduardo Nobre who claims that the Prince "did not live up to the expectations and qualities of the Portuguese Infanta". Despite their issues, they had eight children.

Although she renounced her claims to the Portuguese throne when she married, Maria Anna could still become Queen if the male line became extinct. This situation nearly happened in 1861, when King Pedro V and two of her other brothers died from typhoid fever and left no children. However, this hypothesis was completely put aside when her brother King Luís I married Princess Maria Pia of Savoy and had two sons, the future Carlos I and Infante Afonso. Despite everything, it is unlikely that Maria Anna ever gave this hypothesis great importance because of her troubled marriage and many children.

Around 1883, her youngest son, Prince Albert of Saxony, became seriously ill. Maria Anna took care of him for several months until he recovered. This effort would be fatal, as the Infanta died from exhaustion, on 5 February 1884, before her husband became king. Her husband would remain unmarried for the rest of his life.

In Portugal, her second brother, Luís I, soon succeeded her eldest brother, Peter V, as king.

Her husband's elder brother Albert succeeded her father-in-law as King of Saxony and gradually it became clear that he and his wife, Carola of Vasa, were not able to have children of their own. Maria Anna's eldest son would almost certain to one day succeed to the throne.

== Children ==
Name	Birth	Death	Notes
Marie Johanna Amalie Ferdinande Antonie Luise Juliane	19 June 1860	2 March 1861	died in childhood, no issue
Elisabeth Albertine Karoline Sidonie Ferdinande Leopoldine Antonie Auguste Clementine	14 February 1862	18 May 1863	died in childhood, no issue
Mathilde Marie Auguste Viktorie Leopoldine Karoline Luise Franziska Josepha	19 March 1863	27 March 1933	died unmarried, no issue
Frederick Augustus Johann Ludwig Karl Gustav Gregor Philipp	25 May 1865	18 February 1932	married Archduchess Louise of Austria-Tuscany (1870–1947), later divorced, had issue
Maria Josepha Luise Philippine Elisabeth Pia Angelica Margarethe	31 May 1867	28 May 1944	married to her second cousin Archduke Otto Franz of Austria (1865–1906), had issue
Johann Georg Pius Karl Leopold Maria Januarius Anacletus	10 July 1869	24 November 1938	married first Duchess Maria Isabella of Württemberg (1871–1904), without issue, and second Princess Maria Immaculata of Bourbon-Two Sicilies (1874–1906), without issue
Maximilian Wilhelm August Albert Karl Gregor Odo	17 November 1870	12 January 1951	ordained as a priest, died unmarried, no issue
Albert Karl Anton Ludwig Wilhelm Viktor	25 February 1875	16 September 1900	died unmarried, no issue

Princess Maria Anna predeceased her father Ferdinand, her husband George, and her brother-in-law King Albert of Saxony. In 1902, George succeeded his childless brother as king, and on his death in 1904, Maria Anna's eldest son became King of Saxony as Frederick Augustus III.

== Ancestry ==
Ancestors of Infanta Maria Ana of Portugal (1843–1884)

8. Francis, Duke of Saxe-Coburg-Saalfeld
4. Prince Ferdinand of Saxe-Coburg and Gotha
9. Countess Augusta Reuss of Ebersdorf
2. Fernando II of Portugal
10. Ferenc József, Prince Koháry de Csábrág et Szitnya
5. Princess Mária Antónia Koháry de Csábrág et Szitnya
11. Countess Maria Antonia von Waldstein zu Wartenberg
1. Infanta Maria Ana of Portugal
12. João VI of Portugal
6. Pedro I of Brazil and IV of Portugal
13. Infanta Carlota Joaquina of Spain
3. Maria II of Portugal
14. Francis II, Holy Roman Emperor
7. Archduchess Leopoldina of Austria
15. Princess Maria Theresa of Naples and Sicily
