= Cape May (disambiguation) =

Cape May is the southernmost point of the U.S. state of New Jersey, at the entrance to Delaware Bay.

Cape May may also refer to:

- Cape May, New Jersey, a city in New Jersey
- Cape May (Antarctica), a headland in McMurdo Sound, Antarctica
- USS Cape May, a United States Navy cargo ship and troop transport
- SS Cape May (T-AKR-5063), Heavy Lift Ship of Military Sealift Command's Sealift Program Office
- The Cape May, a Canadian rock band

== See also ==
- Cape May County, New Jersey
- Cape May Court House, New Jersey, a census-designated place
- Cape May Point, New Jersey, a borough
- Cape May Seashore Lines, a short line railroad
- Cape May warbler, Dendroica tigrina, a small bird
- Cape May County Park and Zoo, a park and zoo in Cape May Court House, New Jersey
