= Anna of Saxony (disambiguation) =

Anna of Saxony (1544–1577), was the daughter of Maurice, Elector of Saxony and wife of William the Silent.

Anna of Saxony may also refer to:

- Anna of Saxe-Wittenberg (died 1327), daughter of Albert II, Duke of Saxony, wife of Henry II, Lord of Mecklenburg
- Anna of Meissen (died 1395), Duchess of Saxe-Wittenberg as wife of Rudolf III, daughter of Balthasar, Landgrave of Thuringia
- Anna of Saxe-Wittenberg (died 1426), wife of Duke Frederick I of Brunswick-Lüneburg, a German anti-king
- Anna of Saxony, Landgravine of Hesse (1420–1462), wife of Landgrave Louis III of Hesse
- Anna of Saxony, Electress of Brandenburg (1437–1512), daughter of Frederick II, Elector of Saxony and wife of Albert III, Margrave of Brandenburg
- Anne of Denmark, Electress of Saxony (1532–1585)
- Anna of Saxony (1567–1613), by marriage Duchess of Saxe-Coburg-Eisenach
- Princess Anna of Saxony (1836–1859), daughter of John of Saxony, wife of Archduke Ferdinand, Hereditary Prince of Tuscany
- Princess Anna of Saxony (1903–1976), daughter of Frederick Augustus III of Saxony, wife of Archduke Joseph Francis of Austria

== See also ==
- Maria Anna of Saxony (disambiguation)
- Princess Anna Sophie of Denmark (1647–1717), Electress of Saxony
- Anna Sophie of Saxe-Gotha-Altenburg (1670–1728)
