= George, King of Saxony =

King of Saxony from 1902 to 1904

George
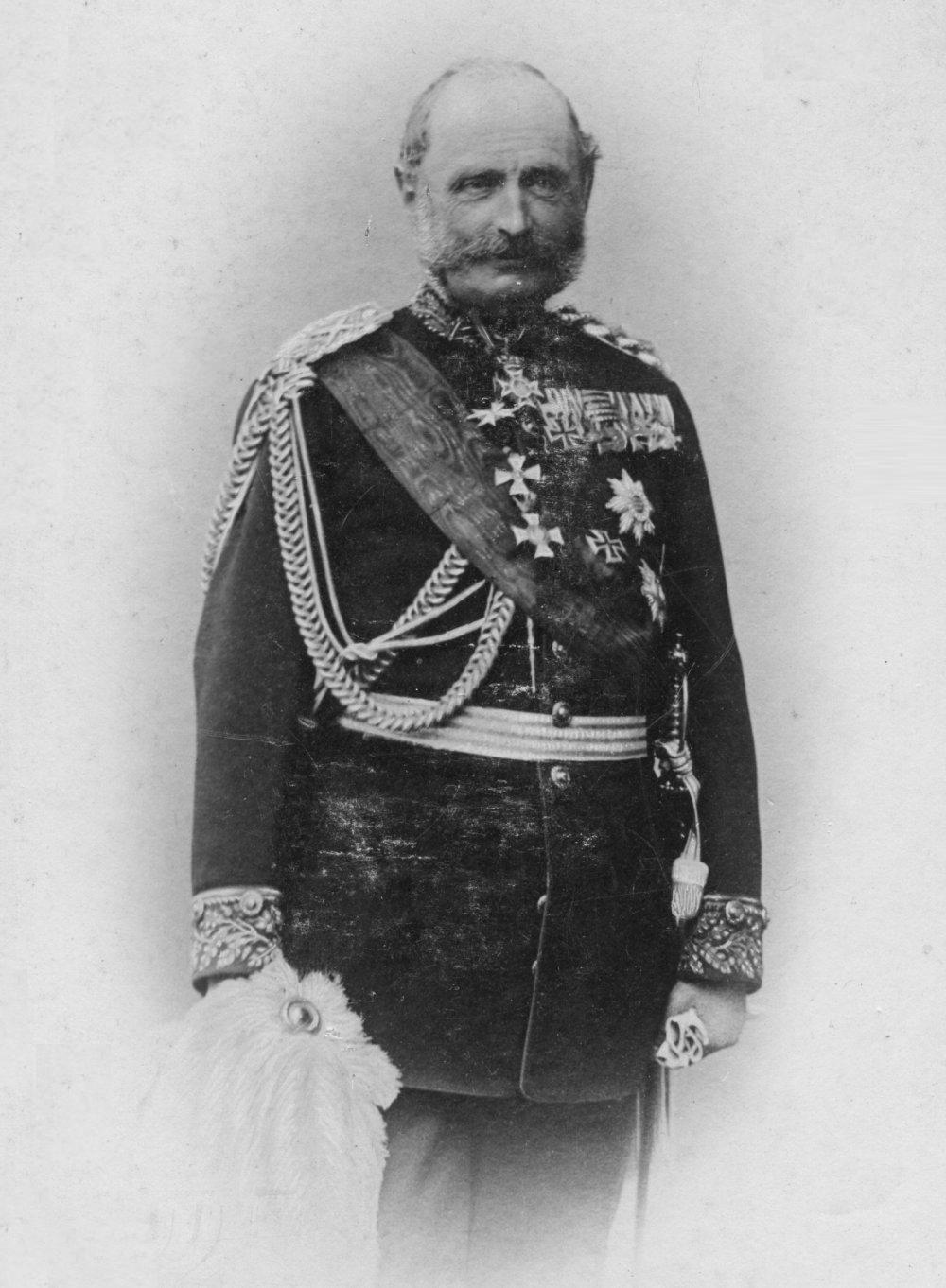
- Photograph, 1902

King of Saxony
- Reign: 19 June 1902 – 15 October 1904
- Predecessor: Albert
- Successor: Frederick Augustus III
- Born: 8 August 1832; Dresden
- Died: 15 October 1904 (aged 72); Pillnitz
- Burial: Katholische Hofkirche
- Spouse: Maria Anna of Portugal (m. 1859; died 1884)
- Issue more...: Princess Marie Johanna; Princess Elisabeth; Princess Mathilde; Frederick Augustus III; Archduchess Maria Josepha of Austria; Prince Johann Georg; Prince Maximilian; Prince Albert
Names
- German: Friedrich August Georg Ludwig Wilhelm Maximilian Karl Maria Nepomuk Baptist Xaver Cyriacus Romanus; English: Frederick Augustus George Louis William Maximilian Charles Maria Nepomuk Baptist Xavier Cyriacus Romanus
- House: Wettin (Albertine line)
- Father: John, King of Saxony
- Mother: Amalie Auguste of Bavaria
- Religion: Roman Catholicism

George (German: Georg; 8 August 1832 – 15 October 1904) was king of Saxony and member of the House of Wettin.

== Early life ==
George was born in the Saxon capital, Dresden. He was the second son of King John of Saxony and his wife, Princess Amalie Auguste of Bavaria, daughter of King Maximilian I Joseph of Bavaria.

== Marriage ==
On 11 May 1859 at Belém Palace in Lisbon, George married, Infanta Maria Anna of Portugal, eldest surviving daughter of Queen Maria II of Portugal and her consort, Prince Ferdinand of Saxe-Coburg and Gotha-Koháry, and the younger sister of King Pedro V of Portugal. Maria Anna died young and George stayed unmarried for the rest of his long life.

=== Issue ===
Name	Birth	Death	Notes
Marie Johanna Amalie Ferdinande Antonie Luise Juliane	19 June 1860	2 March 1861 (aged 0)	died in childhood, no issue
Elisabeth Albertine Karoline Sidonie Ferdinande Leopoldine Antonie Auguste Clementine	14 February 1862	18 May 1863 (aged 1)	died in childhood, no issue
Mathilde Marie Auguste Viktorie Leopoldine Karoline Luise Franziska Josepha	19 March 1863	27 March 1933 (aged 70)	died unmarried, no issue
Frederick Augustus Johann Ludwig Karl Gustav Gregor Philipp	25 May 1865	18 February 1932 (aged 66)	married Archduchess Louise of Austria (1870–1947), had issue
Maria Josepha Luise Philippine Elisabeth Pia Angelica Margarethe	31 May 1867	28 May 1944 (aged 76)	married to her second cousin Archduke Otto Franz of Austria (1865–1906), had issue
Johann Georg Pius Karl Leopold Maria Januarius Anacletus	10 July 1869	24 November 1938 (aged 69)	married first Duchess Maria Isabella of Württemberg (1871–1904) and second Princess Maria Immaculata of Bourbon-Two Sicilies (1874–1906)
Maximilian Wilhelm August Albert Karl Gregor Odo	17 November 1870	12 January 1951 (aged 80)	ordained as a Roman Catholic priest
Albert Karl Anton Ludwig Wilhelm Viktor	25 February 1875	16 September 1900 (aged 25)	died unmarried, no issue, the result of injuries sustained in a carriage crash caused by Prince Miguel of Braganza

== Military career ==
George served under his brother Albert's command during the Austro-Prussian War of 1866 and in the Franco-German War. In the re-organisation of the army which accompanied the march towards Paris, his brother the Crown Prince gained a separate command over the 4th army (Army of the Meuse) consisting of the Saxon XII corps, the Prussian Guard corps, and the IV (Prussian Saxony) corps and George succeeded him in command of the XII corps.

== King of Saxony ==
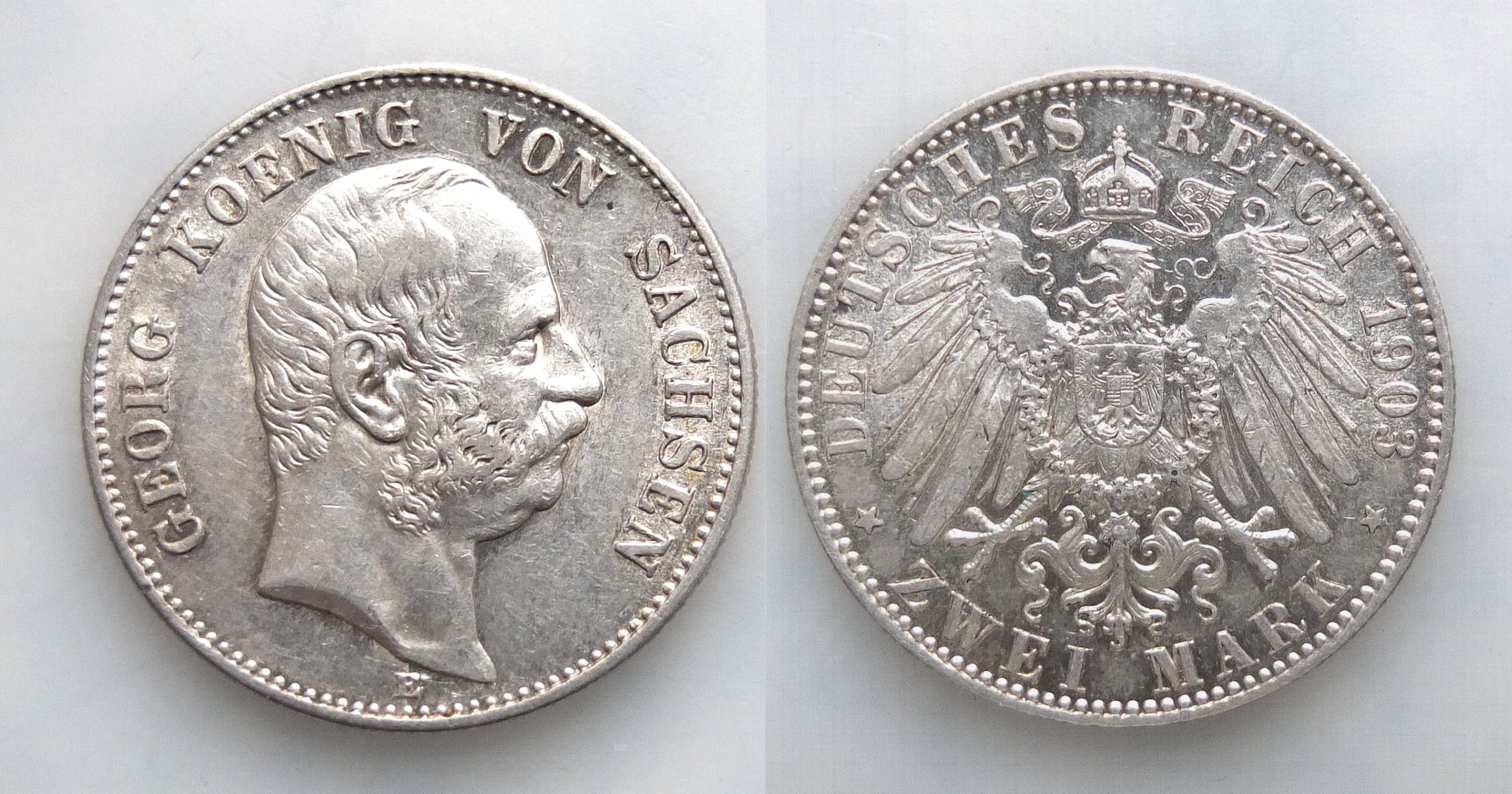
2 Mark coin with the portrait of King George (coined 1903)

Prince George was a Generalfeldmarschall before his ascension. It gradually became clear that George's elder brother, Albert (1828–1902), and his wife, Queen Carola (1833–1907), would not have any children, thereby making George the heir presumptive to the throne. He succeeded Albert as King of Saxony on 19 June 1902, albeit for just a brief two-year reign. On 15 October 1904 he died in Pillnitz and was succeeded by his eldest son, Frederick Augustus III (1865–1932), who was deposed in 1918.

King George was a controversial figure. He divorced by royal decree his eldest son from his daughter-in-law, Crown Princess Luise. Luise's flight from Dresden was due to her father-in-law's threatening to have her interned in a mental asylum at the Sonnenstein Castle for life.

== Honours and awards ==
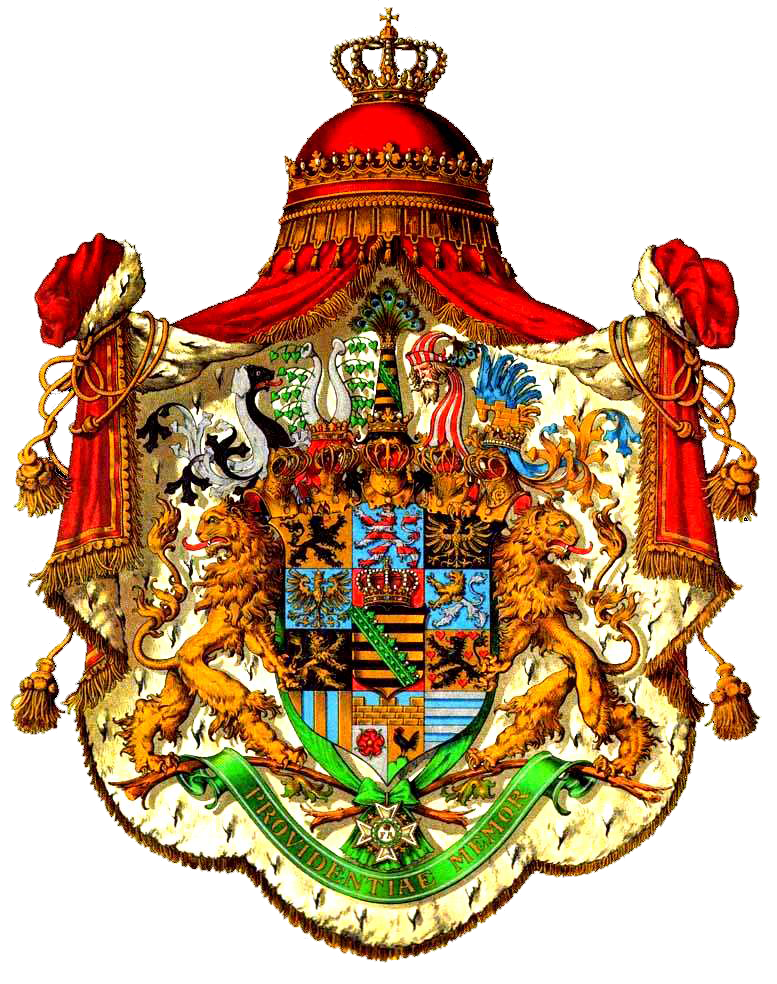
Coat of Arms of the King of Saxony

- Kingdom of Saxony:
  - Knight of the Rue Crown, 1833
  - Commander of the Military Order of St. Henry, 1st Class, 1870; Grand Cross, 1898
  - Grand Cross of the Albert Order
- Kingdom of Prussia:
  - Knight of the Black Eagle, 29 November 1847; with Collar
  - Pour le Mérite (military), 6 December 1870; with Oak Leaves, 8 March 1896
  - Iron Cross, 1st and 2nd Classes
  - Grand Commander's Cross of the Royal House Order of Hohenzollern, 6 September 1879
- Austrian Empire:
  - Grand Cross of St. Stephen, 1849
  - Knight of the Golden Fleece, 1862
- Grand Duchy of Hesse:
  - Grand Cross of the Ludwig Order, 9 June 1851
  - Military Merit Cross, 9 July 1871
- Kingdom of Hanover: Grand Cross of the Royal Guelphic Order, 1851
- Russian Empire:
  - Knight of St. Andrew, May 1852
  - Knight of St. Alexander Nevsky, May 1852
- Kingdom of Bavaria: Knight of St. Hubert, 1853
- (Saxe-Coburg and Gotha) (Duchy of Saxe-Altenburg) (Saxe-Meiningen) Ernestine duchies: Grand Cross of the Saxe-Ernestine House Order, 1854
- Belgium: Grand Cordon of the Order of Leopold, 8 August 1855
- Hesse-Kassel: Knight of the Golden Lion, 27 September 1857
- Saxe-Weimar-Eisenach: Grand Cross of the White Falcon, 28 September 1857
- Brunswick: Grand Cross of Henry the Lion, 1857
- Baden:
  - Knight of the House Order of Fidelity, 1858
  - Grand Cross of the Zähringer Lion, 1858
- Nassau: Knight of the Gold Lion of Nassau, November 1865
- Württemberg:
  - Grand Cross of the Military Merit Order, 30 December 1870
  - Grand Cross of the Württemberg Crown, 1886
- Oldenburg: Grand Cross of the Order of Duke Peter Friedrich Ludwig, with Golden Crown, 29 April 1876
- (Thailand) Siam: Knight of the Order of the Royal House of Chakri, 24 August 1897
- Empire of Japan: Grand Cordon of the Order of the Chrysanthemum, 31 January 1903
- Kingdom of Portugal:
  - Grand Cross of the Tower and Sword
  - Grand Cross of the Sash of the Two Orders

== Ancestry ==
Ancestors of George, King of Saxony

8. Frederick Christian, Elector of Saxony
4. Maximilian, Hereditary Prince of Saxony
9. Duchess Maria Antonia of Bavaria
2. John of Saxony
10. Ferdinand, Duke of Parma
5. Princess Carolina of Parma
11. Archduchess Maria Amalia of Austria
1. George of Saxony
12. Frederick Michael, Count Palatine of Zweibrücken
6. Maximilian I Joseph of Bavaria
13. Countess Palatine Maria Franziska of Sulzbach
3. Princess Amalie Auguste of Bavaria
14. Charles Louis, Hereditary Prince of Baden
7. Princess Caroline of Baden
15. Princess Amalie of Hesse-Darmstadt

== See also ==
- Rulers of Saxony

George, King of Saxony House of Wettin Born: 8 August 1832 Died: 15 October 1904
Regnal titles
Preceded by Albert	King of Saxony; 1902–1904	Succeeded by Frederick Augustus III
