= Prince Albert of Saxony (1875–1900) =

Saxon royal (1875–1900)

Prince Albert
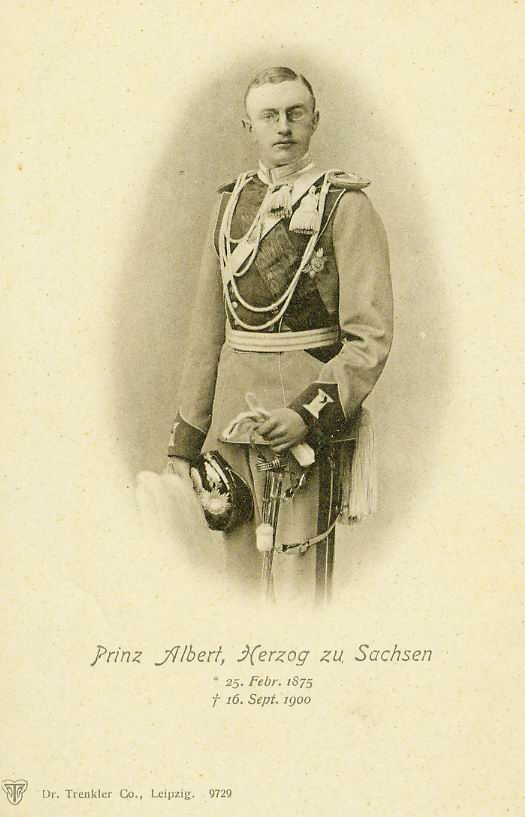
- Albert, circa 1897
- Born: 25 February 1875; Dresden, Kingdom of Saxony, German Empire
- Died: 16 September 1900 (aged 25); Wölkau, Landkreis Delitzsch, Province of Saxony, Kingdom of Prussia, German Empire
Names
- Albert Karl Anton Ludwig Wilhelm Viktor
- House: Wettin
- Father: George, King of Saxony
- Mother: Maria Ana of Portugal

Prince Albert Charles Anthony Louis William Victor of Saxony, Duke of Saxony (German: Albert Karl Anton Ludwig Wilhelm Viktor; 25 February 1875 – 16 September 1900) was a Saxon prince from the House of Wettin. He was the youngest son of King Georg I of Saxony (son of King Johann I of Saxony and his consort Princess Amalie Auguste of Bavaria), and Infanta Maria Ana of Portugal (daughter of Queen Maria II of Portugal and her consort, Prince Ferdinand of Saxe-Coburg and Gotha-Kohary).

He died on 16 September 1900 in a traffic accident. A phaeton driven by Miguel de Bragança hit Albert's carriage so violently that the carriage overturned into a ditch. Albert died from his injuries a few hours later. There were rumours that Miguel had done this on purpose, but this was never proven. Because it could not be determined whether this was an accident or intentional, Miguel escaped a court martial. However, he had to resign from his army post and leave the country.
