= Princess Louise-Marie =

Princess Louise-Marie may refer to:

- Louisa Maria Teresa Stuart (1682-1712), known in French as Louise Marie
- Princess Louise-Marie of Belgium (1858-1924), eldest daughter of King Leopold II of Belgium and Marie Henriette of Austria
- Princess Louise-Marie of France (1737-1787), Carmelite nun

== See also ==
- Louise-Marie
- Princess Louise (disambiguation)
- Princess Marie (disambiguation)
