= USS Cape May =

Cargo ship of the United States Navy

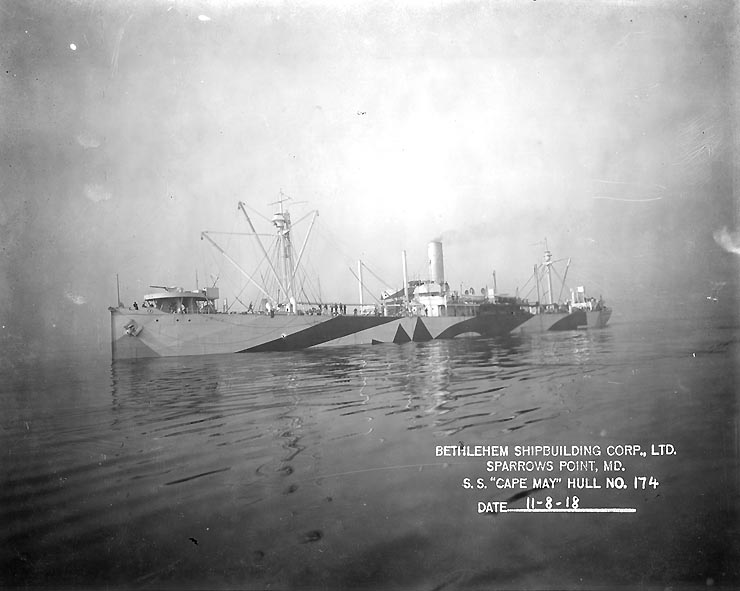
- USS Cape May off the Bethlehem Shipbuilding Company shipyard at Sparrows Point, Maryland, on 8 November 1918.

History

United States
- Name: USS Cape May
- Namesake: Cape May, a cape on the coast of New Jersey (previous name retained)
- Builder: Bethlehem Shipbuilding Company, Sparrows Point, Maryland
- Launched: 24 August 1918
- Completed: 1918
- Acquired: 24 October 1918
- Commissioned: 25 October 1918
- Decommissioned: 25 August 1919
- Fate: Transferred to United States Shipping Board 25 August 1919; Entered commercial service
- Notes: In commercial service as SS Cape May 1919-1925, as SS Maliko 1925-1947, as SS Shahin 1947-1948, and as SS Bharateatlia 1948-1953; Scrapped 1953

General characteristics
- Type: Cargo ship and troop transport
- Tonnage: 6,867 Gross register tons
- Displacement: 14,469 tons (normal)
- Length: 428 ft 8 in (130.66 m)
- Beam: 53 ft 6 in (16.31 m)
- Draft: 29 ft 6 in (8.99 m)
- Installed power: 4,000 indicated horsepower
- Propulsion: One steam engine, one shaft
- Speed: 12 knots (maximum)
- Complement: 52
- Armament: 1 × 4-inch (102-millimeter) gun

USS Cape May (ID-3520) was a United States Navy cargo ship and troop transport in commission from 1918 to 1919.

Cape May was built in 1918 at Sparrows Point, Maryland, by the Bethlehem Shipbuilding Company as the cargo ship SS War Saturn for the United States Shipping Board; she was renamed SS Cape May while under construction. Upon her completion, the Shipping Board transferred her on 24 October 1918 to the U.S. Navy for World War I service. Assigned the naval registry Identification Number (ID. No.) 3520, she was commissioned as USS Cape May on 25 October 1918.

Cape May cleared Baltimore, Maryland, on 8 November 1918 laden with general cargo for the American Expeditionary Force in France. World War I ended during her voyage, on 11 November 1918. She arrived at St. Nazaire, France, on 24 November 1918, where she loaded military supplies no longer required in Europe and embarked passengers. She departed St. Nazaire on 30 December 1918 for Newport News, Virginia, where she arrived on 15 January 1919. She then moved to Baltimore to unload cargo there.

At Baltimore, Cape May was converted for service as a troop transport. She then made two voyages to France to bring servicemen home to New York City. On 24 August 1919 she arrived at Norfolk, Virginia.

Cape May was decommissioned at Norfolk on 25 August 1919 and was transferred to the United States Shipping Board the same day.

Cape May returned to commercial service as SS Cape May. The Shipping Board sold her in 1920 to the Atlantic, Gulf and Pacific Steamship Corporation of Baltimore, but repossessed her in 1922. The Shipping Board sold her in 1925 to the Matson Navigation Company, which renamed her SS Maliko. In 1947, Matson sold Maliko to Wallen and Company of Hong Kong, which renamed her SS Shahin. In 1948, she was sold to the Bharat Line, Ltd., of Bombay, India, and renamed SS Bharateatlia. She was scrapped in Japan in 1953.
