= Queen Mary's Hospital =

Queen Mary Hospital or Queen Mary's Hospital may refer to:

== Canada ==
- Queen Mary Hospital, a hospital in Toronto, now part of West Park Healthcare Centre

== Hong Kong ==
- Queen Mary Hospital (Hong Kong), a public district general hospital in Pok Fu Lam, Hong Kong
  - Queen Mary Hospital station, a proposed MTR station

== New Zealand ==
- Queen Mary Hospital (Hanmer Springs), South Island
- Queen Mary Hospital, Dunedin, defunct hospital in Dunedin, South Island

== United Kingdom ==
- Queen Mary's Hospital, Roehampton, London
- Queen Mary's Hospital, Sidcup, South East London
- Queen Mary's Hospital, Carshalton, London (former)
- Queen Mary's Hospital for the East End, Stratford, London (former)

== See also ==
- Queen Mary (disambiguation)
- QMH (disambiguation)
