= May, Russia =

May (Russian: Май) is the name of several rural localities in Russia:

- May, Dubrovsky District, Bryansk Oblast, a village in Peklinsky Rural Administrative Okrug of Dubrovsky District in Bryansk Oblast; 53°29′N 33°25′E
- May, Klimovsky District, Bryansk Oblast, a settlement in Plavensky Rural Administrative Okrug of Klimovsky District in Bryansk Oblast; 52°29′N 32°22′E
- May, Starodubsky District, Bryansk Oblast, a settlement in Zapolskokhaleyevichsky Rural Administrative Okrug of Starodubsky District in Bryansk Oblast; 52°39′N 32°27′E
- May, Kaluga Oblast, a village in Kuybyshevsky District of Kaluga Oblast
- May, Gorny District, Sakha Republic, a selo in Berdigestyakhsky Rural Okrug of Gorny District in the Sakha Republic
- May, Verkhnevilyuysky District, Sakha Republic, a selo in Meyiksky Rural Okrug of Verkhnevilyuysky District in the Sakha Republic
