= May Company Building =

May Company Building may refer to:

- May Company Building (Los Angeles), on Broadway in Downtown Los Angeles
- May Company Building (Mission Valley, San Diego) at Westfield Mission Valley shopping center, San Diego
- May Company Building (Wilshire, Los Angeles), on the Miracle Mile in the Wilshire district, Los Angeles, renamed the Saban Building in 2017
- May Company Building (Cleveland, Ohio)
