= Princess Marie of Baden =

Princess Marie of Baden may refer to:

- Princess Marie of Baden (1782–1808), daughter of Charles Louis, Hereditary Prince of Baden; wife of Frederick William, Duke of Brunswick-Wolfenbüttel
- Princess Marie Amelie of Baden (1817–1888), daughter of Charles I, Grand Duke Prince of Baden and wife of William Hamilton, 11th Duke of Hamilton
- Princess Marie of Baden (1834–1899), daughter of Leopold, Grand Duke of Baden; wife of Ernst Leopold, 4th Prince of Leiningen
- Princess Marie of Baden (1865-1939), daughter of Prince Wilhelm of Baden and later Duchess of Anhalt as the wife of Friedrich II
- Princess Marie Alexandra of Baden (1902–1944), daughter of Prince Maximilian of Baden and wife of Prince Wolfgang of Hesse, the would-be heir of the Finnish throne
