= May, West Virginia =

- Unincorporated community
- Location within West Virginia Location within the United States
- Coordinates: 38°39′12″N 79°48′08″W
- Country: United States
- State: West Virginia
- County: Pocahontas
- Elevation: 2,966 ft (904 m)
- Time zone: UTC-5 (Eastern (EST))
  - Summer (DST): UTC-4 (EDT)
- Area codes: 304 & 681
- GNIS feature ID: 1555070

May is an unincorporated community in Pocahontas County, West Virginia, United States. May is 7.5 miles (12.1 km) north of Durbin.
