= Princess Marie of Saxe-Altenburg =

Marie of Saxe-Altenburg may refer to:

- Princess Marie Gasparine of Saxe-Altenburg (1845-1930), daughter of Prince Eduard of Saxe-Altenburg and wife of Charles Gonthier, Prince of Schwarzburg-Sondershausen
- Marie of Saxe-Altenburg (1818-1907), wife of George V of Hanover
- Princess Marie of Saxe-Altenburg (1854–1898) (1854-1898), wife of Prince Albert of Prussia
- Princess Marie Anne of Saxe-Altenburg (1864-1918), wife of Georg, Prince of Schaumburg-Lippe
- Princess Marie of Saxe-Altenburg (1888-1947), daughter of Prince Albert of Saxe-Altenburg
