= Princess Marie of Saxe-Weimar-Eisenach =

Princess Marie of Saxe-Weimar-Eisenach may refer to:

- Grand Duchess Maria Pavlovna of Russia (1786–1859), daughter of Paul I of Russia and wife Charles Frederick, Grand Duke of Saxe-Weimar-Eisenach
- Princess Marie of Saxe-Weimar-Eisenach (1808–1877), daughter of Charles Frederick, Grand Duke of Saxe-Weimar-Eisenach and wife of Prince Charles of Prussia
- Princess Marie Alexandrine of Saxe-Weimar-Eisenach, daughter of Charles Alexander, Grand Duke of Saxe-Weimar-Eisenach and wife of Princess Heinrich VII Reuss of Köstritz
