= Princess Marie of Hesse and by Rhine (1874–1878) =

German princess

Princess Marie
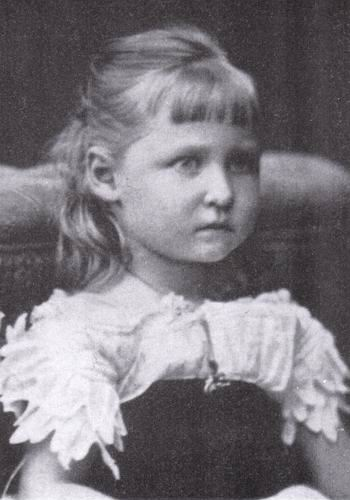
- Princess Marie in May 1878
- Born: 24 May 1874; New Palace, Darmstadt, Grand Duchy of Hesse, German Empire
- Died: 16 November 1878 (aged 4); New Palace, Darmstadt, Grand Duchy of Hesse, German Empire
Names
- Marie Viktoria Feodore Leopoldine
- House: Hesse-Darmstadt
- Father: Louis IV, Grand Duke of Hesse and by Rhine
- Mother: Princess Alice of the United Kingdom

Princess Marie of Hesse and by Rhine (Marie Viktoria Feodore Leopoldine; 24 May 1874 – 16 November 1878) was a Hessian and Rhenish princess, a member of the House of Hesse-Darmstadt. She was the youngest child and fifth daughter of Louis IV, Grand Duke of Hesse and by Rhine, and Princess Alice of the United Kingdom. Her mother was the second daughter of Queen Victoria of the United Kingdom. Marie died of diphtheria and was buried with her mother, who died a few weeks later of the same disease.

== Infancy ==
Marie had six older siblings, Victoria, Elizabeth, Irene, Ernest Louis, Frederick, and Alix.

She was known as "May" in the family. When she was a baby, her mother remarked in a letter that "little sister Maly" bore a strong resemblance to her dead brother Friedrich ("Frittie") at the same age "with such quick eyes and two deep dimples in her cheeks." A few weeks later, Alice wrote that baby "Maly" had fair skin, light brown hair and deep blue eyes. As she grew older, she smiled frequently and Alice thought that she more strongly resembled her older sister Victoria, with "fair hair, marked eyebrows and speaking eyes". She and her sister Alix, two years older, "made a pretty contrast". Her mother thought her youngest child was "enchanting" and as a toddler the little girl called her mother "my 'weetheart". Alix was her constant companion. The two girls were dressed alike and shared the nursery. The family enjoyed a trip to the seaside in the summer of 1877 and the two youngest girls were a source of delight to their mother. Sending photos taken then to her mother, Queen Victoria, Alice wrote that "May has not such fat cheeks in reality; still it is very dear. The two little girlies are so sweet, so dear, merry, and nice. I don't know which is dearest, they are both so captivating".

== Diphtheria ==
Tragedy struck the grand ducal family in 1878. As her sister Victoria described the scene later, the family had been gathered together on the evening of 5 November when she developed a stiff neck. Victoria reported her symptoms to their mother, who thought that it might be mumps and said that it would be "comical" if they all caught it.Victoria felt well enough to read Alice in Wonderland to her younger siblings, while her mother sat nearby chatting with her friend, Katie Macbean, who was filling in for an absent lady-in-waiting. Marie leaped up and begged her mother to let her have more cake. Her siblings asked Miss Macbean to play the piano so they could dance. They danced for half an hour and went to bed in high spirits.

The next morning, Victoria was diagnosed with diphtheria; at three in the morning on 12 November, six-year-old Alix was diagnosed with the disease. Grand Duchess Alice ordered that a steam inhaler should be brought to her room to prevent the seriously ill Alix from choking to death. Hours later, Princess Marie ran into her mother's room, crawled into bed with her and kissed her. By afternoon, Marie as well was displaying the symptoms of the disease, suffering from a high fever. White spots and a white membrane covered the back of her throat. The next day, her sister, Irene, became ill and on the day of 14 November, her brother, Ernest, and her father, Louis, also became ill with diphtheria. Grand Duchess Alice and the doctors nursed the family round the clock. On the morning of 16 November, Marie choked to death from the membrane covering her throat. Her mother, awakened by the doctors, hurried to the nursery, only to find her daughter dead. Grand Duchess Alice sat by her daughter's body, kissing Marie's face and hands, trying to work up the strength to tell her ill husband. She watched as Marie's coffin was wheeled off to the family mausoleum.

For weeks, Grand Duchess Alice concealed Marie's death from the other sick children, who asked about her and tried to send their little sister toys. Elizabeth, who had been sent to stay with her paternal grandmother, was the only child who escaped infection. The sick children were finally told at the beginning of December that Marie had died. Ten-year-old Ernest, at first, refused to believe the news and then broke down in tears. His mother hugged and kissed him, despite the risk of infection. On 7 December, Grand Duchess Alice recognized the symptoms of diphtheria in herself. She died on the morning of 14 December, murmuring "From Friday to Saturday -- four weeks -- May -- dear Papa". (It was the anniversary of Marie's grandfather's death.) Alice was interred beside her daughter. A statue by Joseph Boehm was placed on the tomb of Alice holding Marie in her arms.

It is commonly believed that Marie's niece, Grand Duchess Maria Nikolaevna of Russia, the third daughter of Alix and her husband Nicholas II of Russia, was named for her and the Dowager Empress Maria Feodorovna of Russia.

== Ancestry ==
Ancestors of Princess Marie of Hesse and by Rhine (1874–1878)

8. Louis II, Grand Duke of Hesse and by Rhine
4. Prince Charles of Hesse and by Rhine
9. Princess Wilhelmine of Baden
2. Louis IV, Grand Duke of Hesse and by Rhine
10. Prince Wilhelm of Prussia
5. Princess Elisabeth of Prussia
11. Princess Maria Anna of Hesse-Homburg
1. Princess Marie of Hesse and by Rhine
12. Ernest I, Duke of Saxe-Coburg and Gotha
6. Prince Albert of Saxe-Coburg and Gotha
13. Princess Louise of Saxe-Gotha-Altenburg
3. Princess Alice of the United Kingdom
14. Prince Edward, Duke of Kent and Strathearn
7. Victoria of the United Kingdom
15. Princess Victoria of Saxe-Coburg-Saalfeld

== Gallery ==
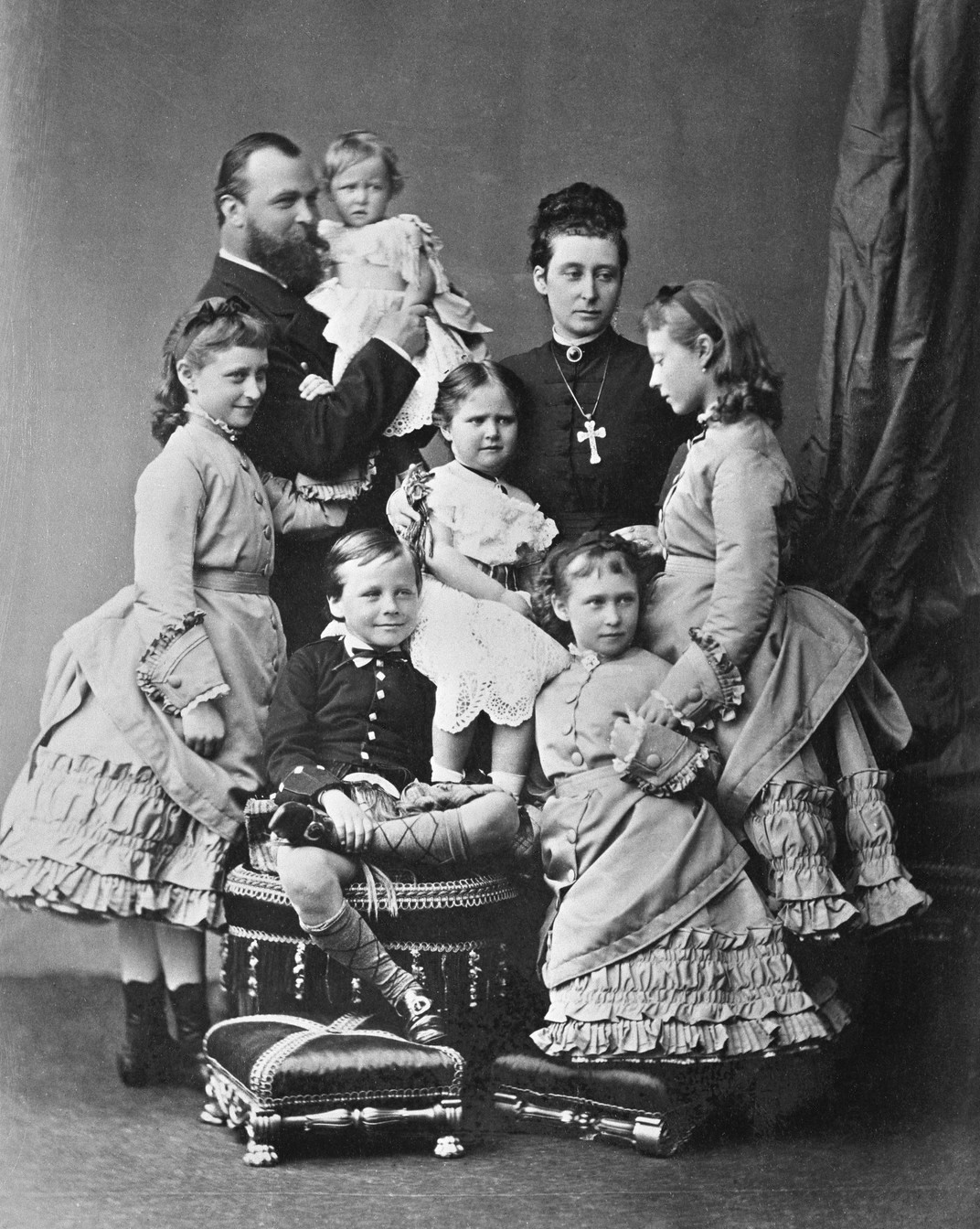
The Hessian family in May 1875: (clockwise from far left): Princess Elisabeth, Grand Duke Ludwig holding Princess Marie, Grand Duchess Alice, Princesses Victoria and Irene, Prince Ernest, and Princess Alix in the center.

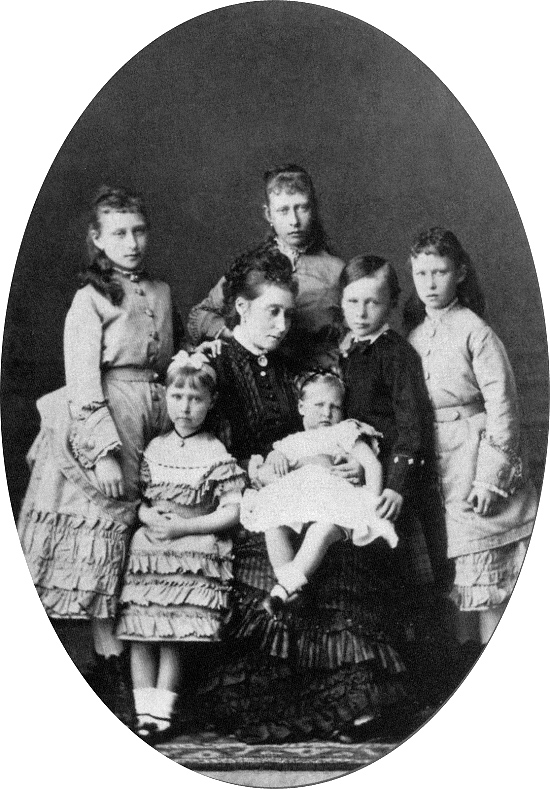
The Hessian children with their mother in 1876. Princess Elisabeth at the top Princess Victoria, at the right, Princess Irene, next to her is Prince Ernst, and then Grand Duchess Alice with Princess Marie in her lap, and Princess Alix.

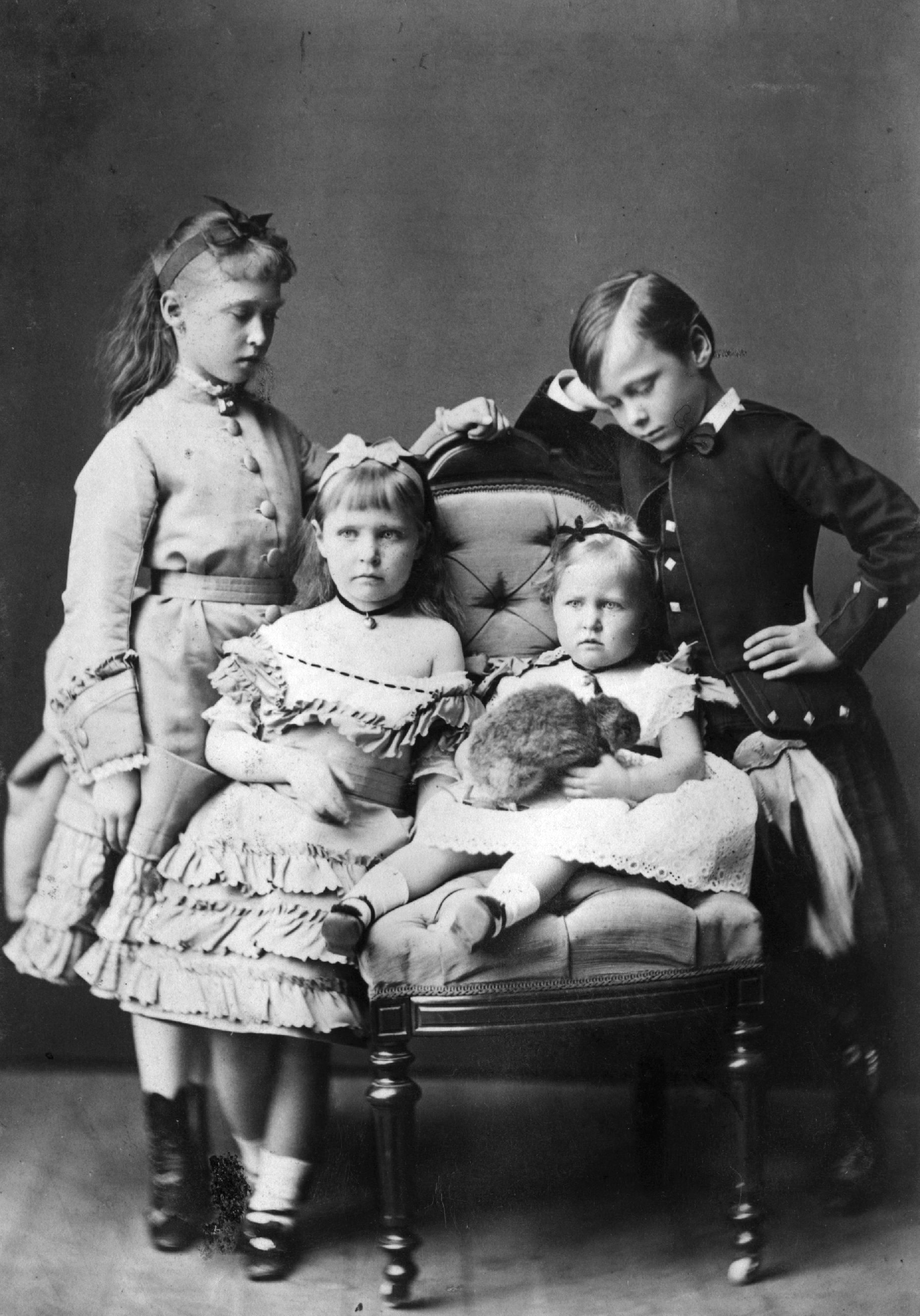
Marie with her elder siblings Irene, Alix and Ernest in about 1876.

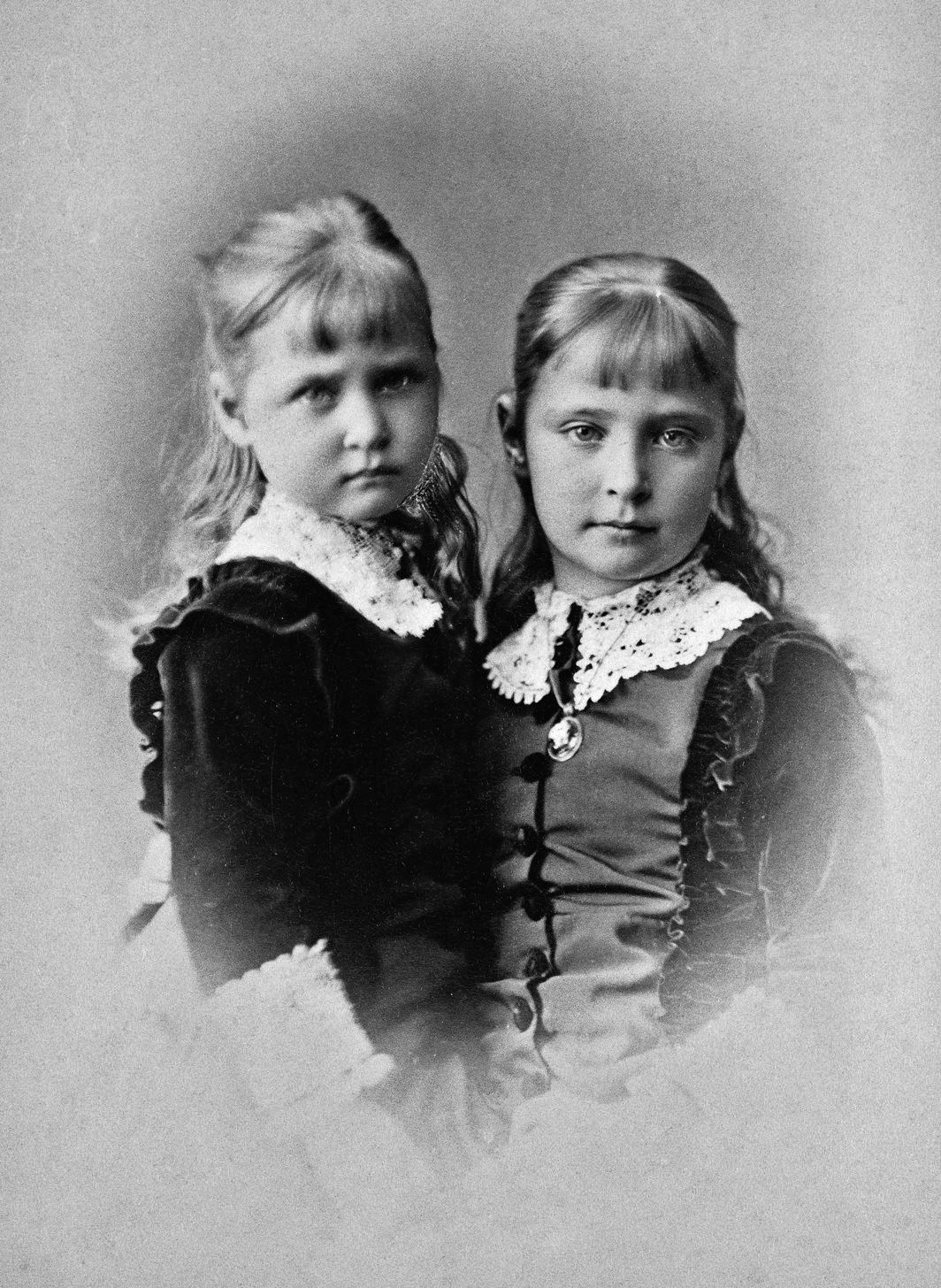
Princesses Marie and Alix of Hesse in May 1878.

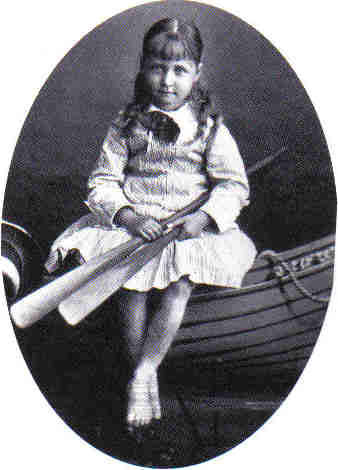
Marie in July 1878 at Southampton

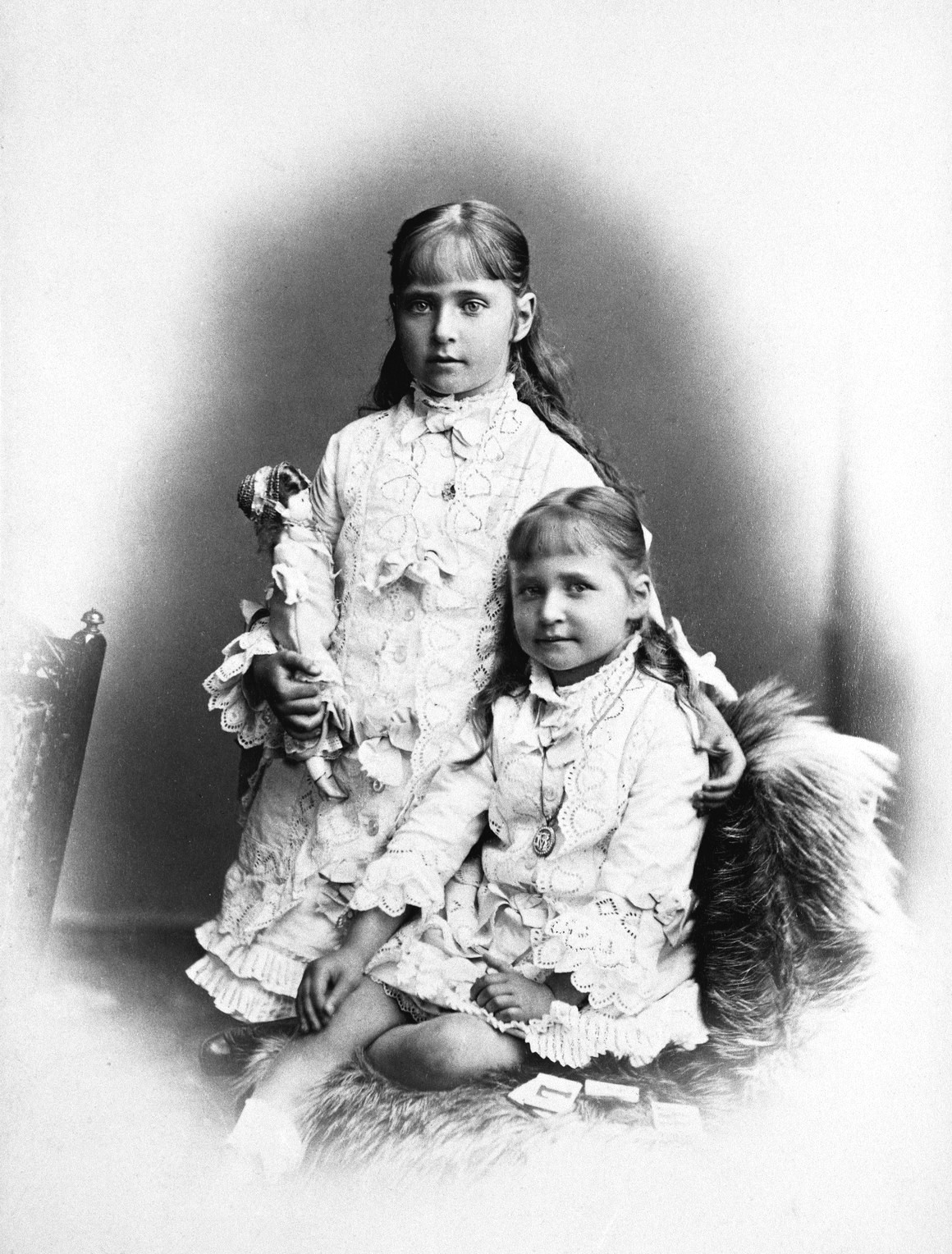
Princesses Alix and Marie of Hesse in July 1878 at Southampton. The girls wore identical dresses and were treated as a pair.

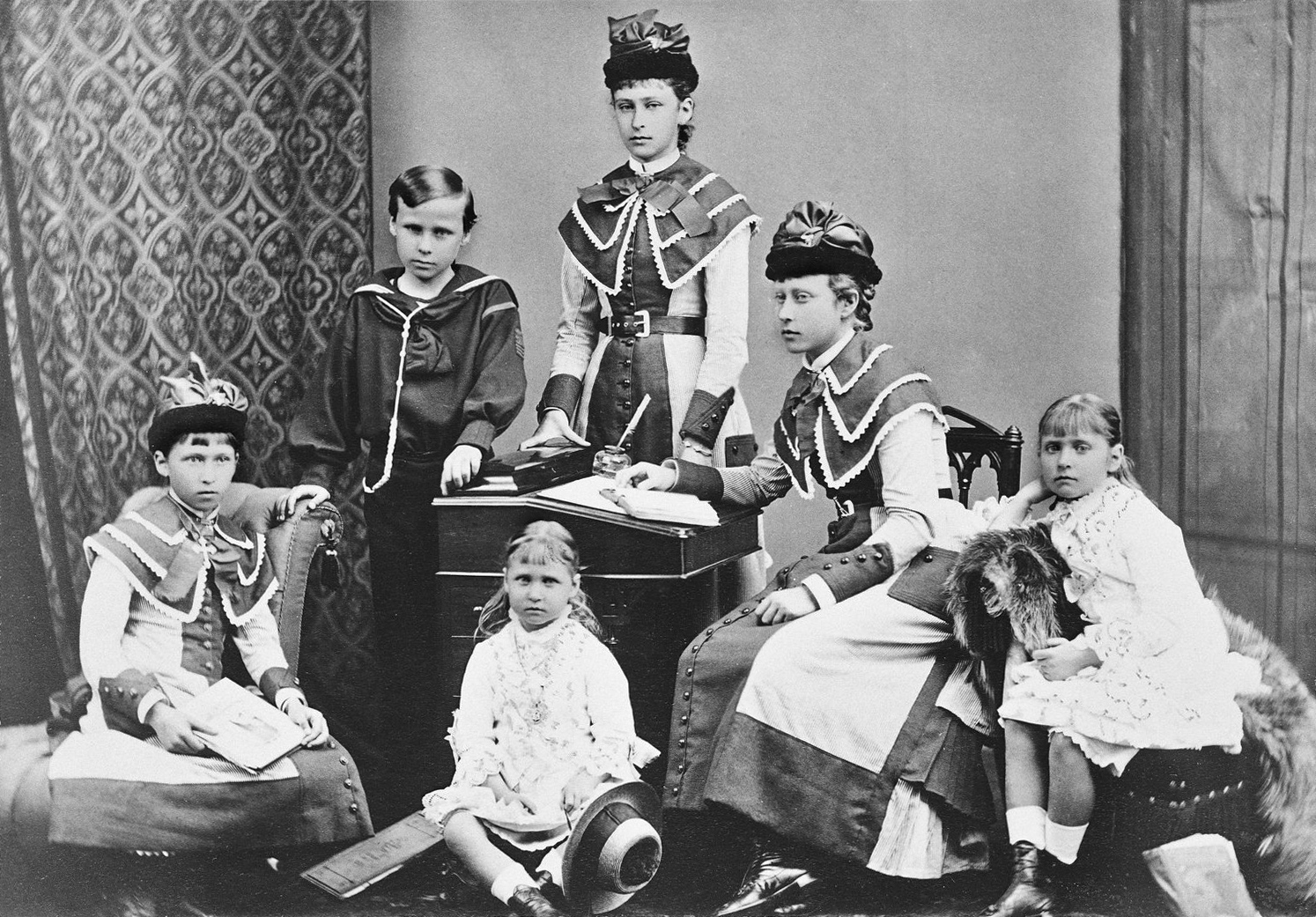
The Hessian children in July 1878. Left to right: Princess Irene, seated; Prince Ernest Louis wearing sailor suit, standing; Princess Marie, seated; Princess Elizabeth, standing behind writing desk; Princess Victoria, seated at writing desk; Princess Alix, seated.

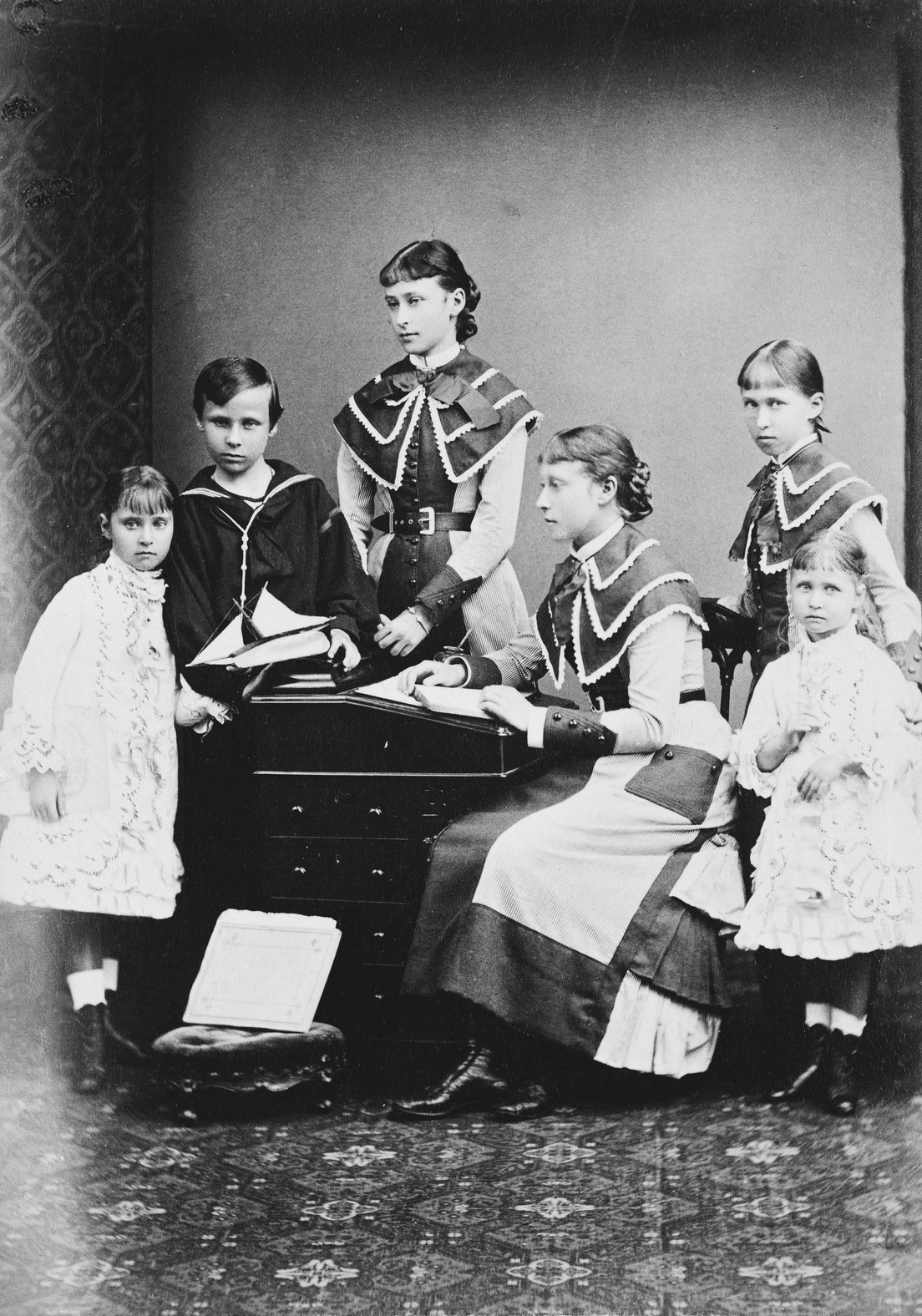
The Hessian children in July 1878. Left to right: Princess Alix, standing; Prince Ernest Louis, standing, sailor suit, holding model yacht; Princess Elizabeth, standing; Princess Victoria, seated; Princess Irene, standing; Princess Marie, standing in front of Irene.

== See also ==
- Maria Alexandrovna (Marie of Hesse)
