= Princess Maria Josepha of Saxony (1867–1944) =

Archduchess of Austria (1867–1944)

Archduchess Maria Josepha
- Archduchess Otto Franz of Austria
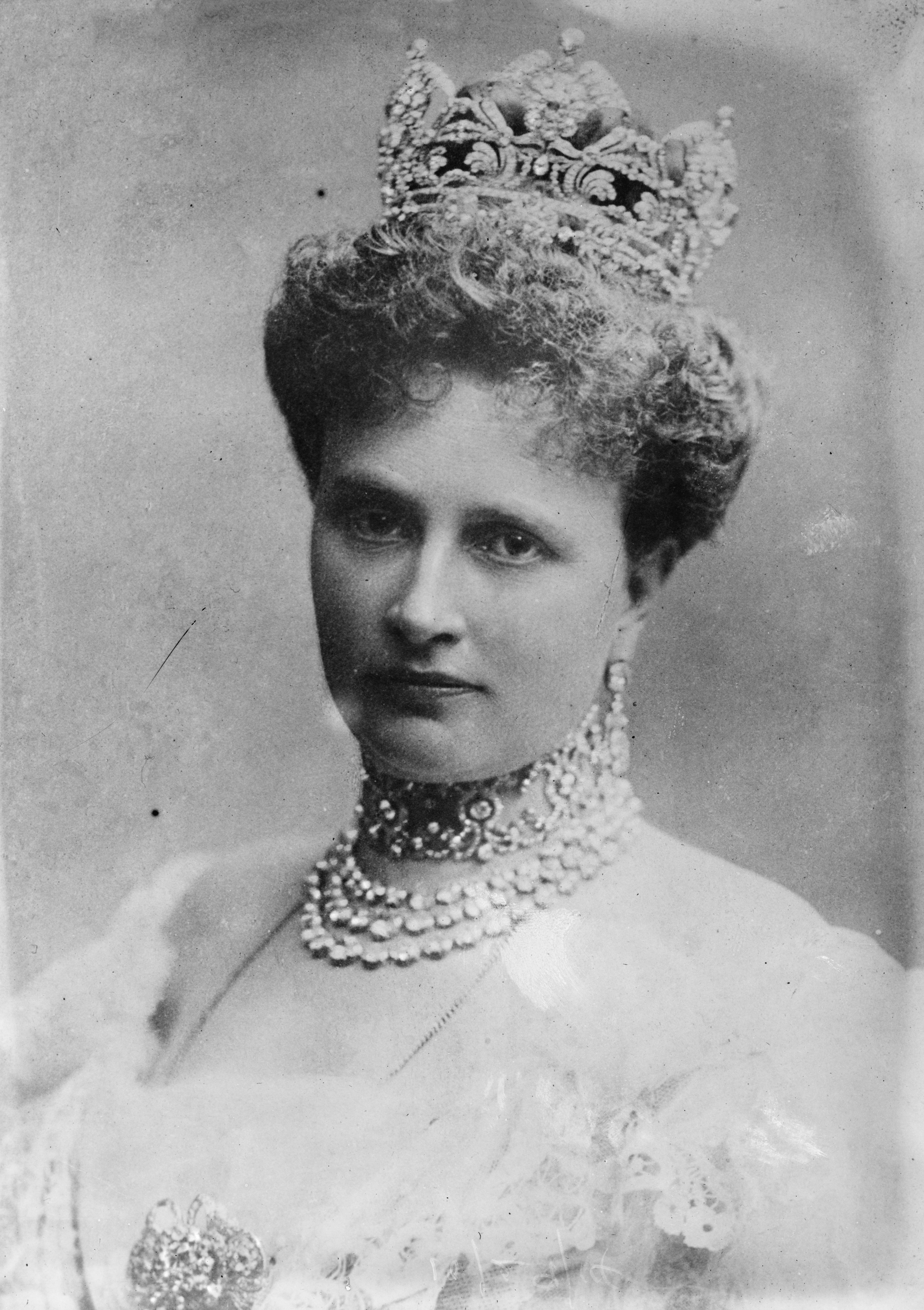
- Maria Josepha c. 1910
- Born: 31 May 1867; Dresden, Kingdom of Saxony, North German Confederation
- Died: 28 May 1944 (aged 76); Erlangen, Bavaria, Nazi Germany
- Burial: Imperial Crypt
- Spouse: Archduke Otto Franz Joseph of Austria (m. 1886; died 1906)
- Issue: Charles I of Austria; Archduke Maximilian Eugen
Names
- German: Maria Josepha Luise Philippine Elisabeth Pia Angelika Margarete
- House: Wettin
- Father: George, King of Saxony
- Mother: Maria Anna of Portugal

Princess Maria Josepha of Saxony (31 May 1867 – 28 May 1944) was the mother of Emperor Charles I of Austria and the fifth child of George of Saxony and Infanta Maria Anna of Portugal.

== Early life ==
Maria Josepha Louise Philippina Elisabeth Pia Angelica Margaretha was the daughter of the future King George of Saxony and his wife, Infanta Maria Anna of Portugal.

== Marriage ==
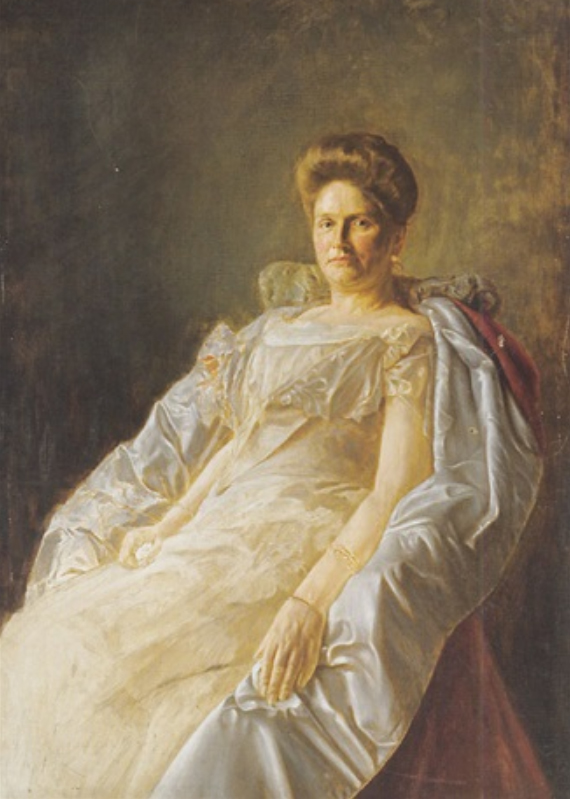
Portrait of Maria Josepha

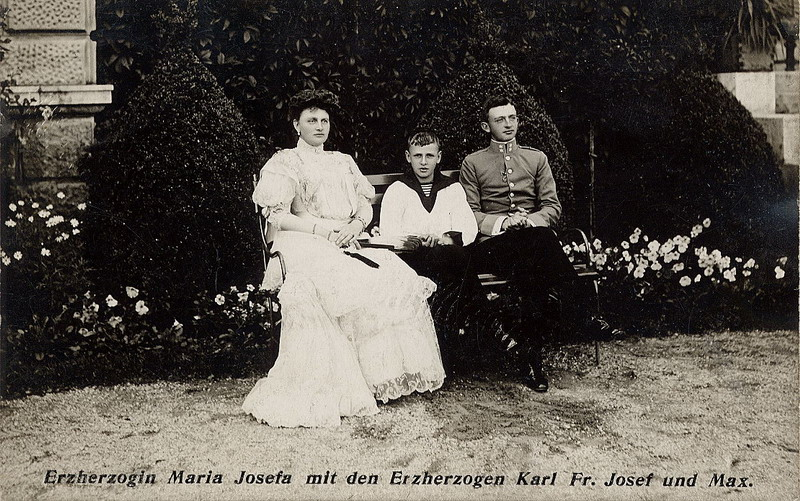
Maria Josepha with her sons, 1910

On 2 October 1886 at age nineteen, she married Archduke Otto Franz of Austria, "der Schöne" (the handsome), younger brother of the Archduke Franz Ferdinand who would later be killed in Sarajevo.

A pious woman, only her strength of religion enabled her to bear the burdens of marriage to the notoriously womanizing Archduke. His frequent absences from his family helped her goal of keeping her children away from his bad influence succeed. Eventually, however, she herself entered into a close friendship with the actor Otto Tressler, who had been presented to her by the emperor Franz Joseph, who felt sorry for her because of the adultery of her spouse. Maria Josepha often invited Tressler to her home; he sometimes met her husband and his friends in the doorway. When her husband died, her ability to avoid extravagant displays of grief was much admired. As a widow, she ended her relationship with Tressler, probably because of her sense of what was appropriate behaviour for a widow. During World War I she nursed the wounded in the Augarten Palace of Vienna, which had been converted into a hospital.

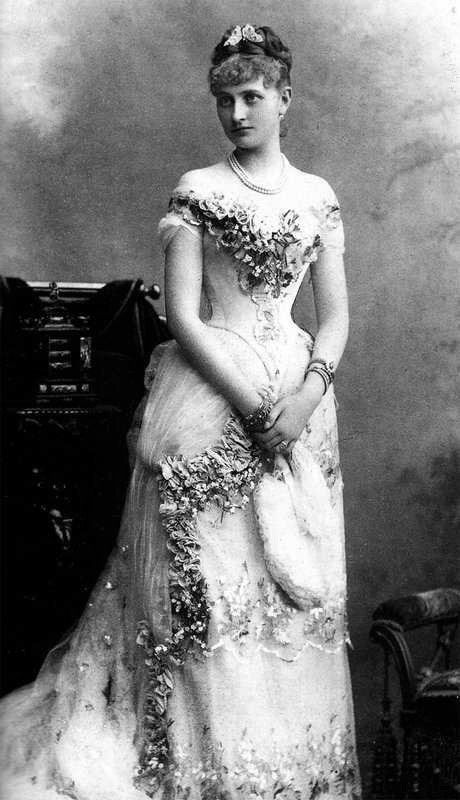
Maria Josepha, c. 1889–1890

In 1919 she left Austria with her son Emperor Charles I of Austria and his wife, Zita of Bourbon-Parma, and went into exile with them. She lived first in Switzerland and from 1921 in Germany.

== Children ==
With Archduke Otto Franz she had issue:

- Archduke Karl Franz of Austria, the last Emperor of Austria, married Princess Zita of Bourbon-Parma and had issue
- Archduke Maximilian Eugen of Austria (1895–1952), who married Princess Franziska of Hohenlohe-Waldenburg-Schillingsfürst and had issue.

== Death ==
Archduchess Maria Josepha died at Schloss Wildenwart in Upper Bavaria, at age 76, a property owned by some members of the Royal Family of Bavaria.

She was laid to rest beside her husband in the New Vault of the Imperial Crypt in Vienna, in Austria, then incorporated into Nazi Germany.

== Ancestry ==
Ancestors of Princess Maria Josepha of Saxony (1867–1944)

8. Maximilian, Hereditary Prince of Saxony
4. John of Saxony
9. Princess Carolina of Parma
2. George of Saxony
10. Maximilian I Joseph of Bavaria
5. Princess Amalie Auguste of Bavaria
11. Princess Caroline of Baden
1. Princess Maria Josepha of Saxony
12. Prince Ferdinand of Saxe-Coburg and Gotha
6. Ferdinand II of Portugal
13. Princess Maria Antonia Koháry of Csábrág and Szitnya
3. Infanta Maria Anna of Portugal
14. Pedro I of Brazil and IV of Portugal
7. Maria II of Portugal
15. Archduchess Leopoldina of Austria

== Sources ==
- Robert Seydel: Die Seitensprünge der Habsburger. Ueberreuterverlag Wien, 2005
