= Princess Mary =

Princess Mary may refer to:

== People ==
- Mary of York (1467–1482), daughter of Edward IV of England
- Mary Tudor, Queen of France (1496–1533), daughter of Henry VII of England
- Mary of Woodstock 14th century English Princess and Nun
- Queen Mary I of England (1516–1558), known as "Princess Mary" before her accession
- Princess Mary of England (1605–1607), daughter of James VI and I
- Mary, Princess Royal and Princess of Orange (1631–1660), daughter of Charles I of England
- Queen Mary II of England (1662–1694), daughter of James VII and II, queen of Scotland & Ireland, wife of King William III, of the House of Orange, and joint ruler with him
- Princess Mary of Great Britain (1723–1772), daughter of George II of Great Britain
- Princess Mary, Duchess of Gloucester and Edinburgh (1776–1857), daughter of George III of the United Kingdom
- Princess Mary Adelaide of Cambridge (1833–1897), granddaughter of George III of the United Kingdom
- Princess Mary of Teck (1867–1953), great-granddaughter of George III of the United Kingdom, Queen consort of George V
- Mary, Princess Royal and Countess of Harewood (1897–1965), daughter of George V of the United Kingdom
- Queen Mary of Denmark (born 1972), Australian-born wife of Frederik X, King of Denmark

== Ships ==
- HMS Princess Mary, ships of the Royal Navy
- SS Princess Mary, a Canadian Pacific British Columbia coast ferry
- Princess Mary (1796 ship), an East India Company "extra ship", later a West Indiaman

== Other ==
- Princess Mary (film), a 1955 Soviet comedy film
- Princess Mary High School, a former school in Halifax, Yorkshire, England
- Princess Mary Lake, in Nunavut, Canada
- Princess Mary Christmas gift box, distributed in World War I
- Princess Mary's Gift Book, a World War I relief book illustrated by Edmund Dulac

== See also ==
- Princess Marie (disambiguation)
- Queen Mary (disambiguation)
