= Queen Mary =

Queen Mary, Queen Marie, or Queen Maria may refer to:

== People ==
=== 12th–13th century ===
- Maria Komnene, Queen of Hungary (1144–1190)
- Maria Komnene, Queen of Jerusalem (1154–1217)
- Maria of Montpellier (1182–1213), queen consort of Aragon
- Maria of Montferrat (1192–1212), queen regnant of Jerusalem
- Maria Laskarina (1206–1270), queen consort of Hungary
- Marie de Coucy (1218–1285), queen consort of Scotland
- Marie of Brabant, Queen of France (1254–1322)
- Mary of Hungary, Queen of Naples (1257–1323)
- María de Molina (1265–1321), queen consort of Castile and León
- Marie of Lusignan, Queen of Aragon (1273–1319)
- Maria of Bytom (1295–1317), queen consort of Hungary
- Maria of Brabant (c. 1190 – May/June 1260), Holy Roman Empress and Queen of Germany, wife of Otto IV

=== 14th century ===
- Marie of Luxembourg, Queen of France (1304–1324)
- Maria of Portugal, Queen of Castile (1313–1357)
- Marie of Korikos (1321–1405), queen consort of Armenia
- Maria of Navarre (1329–1347), queen consort of Aragon
- Maria de Luna (1358–1406), queen consort of Aragon
- Maria, Queen of Sicily (1363–1401)
- Mary of Enghien (1367–1446), queen consort of Napes
- Mary, Queen of Hungary (1371–1395)
- Mary of Lusignan, Queen of Naples (1381–1404)

=== 15th century ===
- Maria of Castile (1401–1458), queen consort of Aragon
- Maria of Aragon, Queen of Castile (1403–1445)
- Marie of Anjou (1404–1463), queen consort of France
- Mary of Guelders (1433–1463), queen consort of Scotland
- Maria of Serbia, Queen of Bosnia (1447–1498)
- Maria of Aragon, Queen of Portugal (1482–1517)
- Mary Tudor, Queen of France (1495–1533)

=== 16th century ===
- Mary of Hungary (governor of the Netherlands) (1505–1558), queen consort of Hungary and Bohemia
- Mary of Guise (1515–1560), queen consort and regent of Scotland
- Mary I of England (1516–1558)
- Maria of Austria, Holy Roman Empress (1528–1603), queen consort of Germany and Bohemia
- Mary, Queen of Scots (1542–1587)
- Marie de' Medici (1575–1642), queen consort of France and Navarre
- Maria Eleonora of Brandenburg (1599–1655), queen consort of Sweden

=== 17th century ===
- Maria Anna of Spain (1606–1646), queen consort of Hungary and Bohemia
- Henrietta Maria of France (1609–1669), queen consort of England, Scotland and Ireland
- Marie Louise Gonzaga (1611–1767), queen consort of Poland
- Maria Leopoldine of Austria (1632–1649), queen consort of Hungary and Bohemia
- Maria Theresa of Spain (1638–1683), queen consort of France
- Marie Casimire Louise de La Grange d'Arquien (1641–1716), queen consort of Poland
- Maria Francisca of Savoy (1646–1683), queen consort of Portugal
- Mary of Modena (1658–1718), queen consort of England
- Mary II of England and Scotland (1662–1694)
- Marie Louise d'Orléans (1662–1689), queen consort of Spain
- Maria Sophia of Neuburg (1666–1699), queen consort of Portugal
- Maria Anna of Neuburg (1667–1740), queen consort of Spain
- Maria Anna of Austria (1683–1754), queen consort of Portugal
- Maria Luisa of Savoy (1688–1714), queen consort of Spain
- Maria Josepha of Austria (1699–1757), queen consort of Poland

=== 18th century ===
- Maria Amalia, Holy Roman Empress (1701–1756), queen consort of Bohemia
- Marie Leszczyńska (1703–1768), queen consort of France
- Maria Theresa (1717–1780)
- Maria Amalia of Saxony (1724–1760), queen consort of Spain
- Maria Antonia Ferdinanda of Spain (1729–1785), queen consort of Sardinia
- Juliana Maria of Brunswick-Wolfenbüttel (1729–1796), queen consort of Denmark
- Maria I of Portugal (1734–1816)
- Maria Josepha of Bavaria (1739–1767), queen consort of Germany
- Maria Luisa of Spain (1745–1792), queen consort of Hungary and Bohemia
- Maria Luisa of Parma (1751–1819), queen consort of Spain
- Maria Carolina of Austria (1752–1814), queen consort of Naples
- Marie Antoinette (1755–1793), queen consort of France and Navarre
- Maria Theresa of Austria, Queen of Saxony (1767–1827), queen consort of Saxony
- Marie of Hesse-Kassel (1767–1852), queen consort of Denmark and Norway
- Maria Theresa of Naples and Sicily (1772–1807), queen consort of Hungary and Bohemia
- Maria Theresa of Austria-Este, Queen of Sardinia (1773–1832), queen consort of Sardinia
- Marie-Louise Coidavid (1778–1851), queen consort of Haiti
- Marie Thérèse of France (1778–1851), queen consort of France (disputed)
- Maria Cristina of Naples and Sicily (1779–1849), queen consort of Sardinia
- Maria Amalia of Naples and Sicily (1782–1866), queen consort of the French
- Maria Ludovika of Austria-Este (1787–1816), queen consort of Hungary and Bohemia
- María Isabella of Spain (1789–1848), queen consort of the Two Sicilies
- Marie Louise of Austria (1791–1847), queen consort of Italy, empress consort of the French
- Maria Isabel of Braganza (1797–1818), queen consort of Spain
- Maria Leopoldina of Austria (1797–1826), queen consort of Portugal

=== 19th century ===
- Maria Theresa of Austria, Queen of Sardinia (1801–1855), queen consort of Sardinia
- Maria Josepha Amalia of Saxony (1803–1829), queen consort of Spain
- Maria Anna of Savoy (1803–1884), queen consort of Hungary and Bohemia
- Maria Anna of Bavaria (1805–1877), queen consort of Saxony
- Maria Christina of the Two Sicilies (1806–1878), queen consort of Spain
- Maria Cristina of Savoy (1812–1836), queen consort of the Two Sicilies
- Maria Theresa of Austria, Queen of the Two Sicilies (1816–1867), queen consort of the Two Sicilies
- Marie of Saxe-Altenburg (1818–1907), Queen of Hanover
- Maria II of Portugal (1819–1853)
- Marie of Prussia (1825–1889), queen consort of Bavaria
- Maria Eutokia Toaputeitou (died 1869), queen consort of Mangareva
- Marie Henriette of Austria (1836–1902), queen consort of the Belgians
- Maria Sophie of Bavaria (1841–1925), queen consort of the Two Sicilies
- Maria Vittoria dal Pozzo (1847–1876), queen consort of Spain
- Maria Pia of Savoy (1847–1911), queen consort of Portugal
- Mary Thomas (labor leader), (c. 1848–1905), known as "Queen Mary"
- Maria Theresa of Austria-Este, Queen of Bavaria (1849–1919), queen consort of Bavaria
- Maria Christina of Austria (1858–1929), queen consort of Spain
- Mary of Teck (1867–1953), queen consort (1910–1936) of the United Kingdom and the British Dominions, wife of King George V
- Marie of Romania (1875–1938)
- Maria of Yugoslavia (1900–1961)

=== 20th century ===
- Marie-José of Belgium (1906–2001), last queen consort of Italy in 1946
- Anne-Marie of Denmark (born 1946), last queen consort of Greece from 1964 to 1973
- Karen Zerby (born 1946), uses the pseudonym "Queen Maria"
- Mary Donaldson (born 1972), queen consort of Denmark since 2024

== Other uses ==
- Queen Mary (beer cocktail)
- Queen Mary (ship), including a list of ships with this name
- Queen Mary trailer
- Queen Mary University of London
- Queen Mary's Hospital (disambiguation)

== See also ==
- Bloody Mary (disambiguation)
- Mary (disambiguation)
- Mary I (disambiguation)
- Mary II (disambiguation)
- Mary Queeny (1913–2003), Egyptian actress
- May Queen (disambiguation)
- Princess Mary (disambiguation)
- Queen Mary Land
- Saint Mary (disambiguation)
