= Saxe-Gessaphe =

Royal house of Saxony

House of Saxe-Gessaphe Haus Sachsen-Gessaphe
- Parent house: House of Saxe (cognatic); House of Gessaphe (agnatic)
- Country: Saxony
- Founded: 1997; 29 years ago
- Founder: Princess Maria Anna of Saxony and Prince Roberto de Afif of Gessaphe
- Current head: Prince Alexander, Margrave of Meissen
- Titles: Margrave of Meissen; The Prince of Saxe-Gessaphe; Prince/Princess of Saxony; Duke/Duchess in Saxony; Prince/Princess of Saxe-Gessaphe

Saxe-Gessaphe is the name of a family descended in the female line from former kings of Saxony under the House of Wettin, a member of which was recognized by a childless pretender to that throne as eventual heir to the deposed dynasty's rights. The claim is contested by an agnatic descendant of the former royal house (Daniel, Margrave of Meissen), and both claims are clouded by conflicting interpretations of the dynastic laws which governed the succession to the defunct throne of Saxony, and by familial dispute.

== Dynastic background ==
The family descends from Princess Anna of Saxony (13 December 1929 – 13 March 2012) and her husband Roberto Afif (1916–1978). Anna was a sister of Maria Emanuel, Margrave of Meissen, the childless head of the royal House of Saxony. Of the five children of the late Prince Friedrich Christian (1893–1968), son and heir of Saxony's last king Friedrich August III (who was obliged to abdicate in 1918 coincident with Germany's surrender in World War I), Anna is the only one who has living, legitimate children.

Succession to Saxony's throne was semi-Salic: only if all male dynasts were to become extinct would the female dynast nearest in kinship to the last male, or her descendants, inherit the throne. Both male and female dynasts, however, were required to "marry equally" (to a member of a reigning, formerly reigning, or mediatised family) in order to transmit dynastic rights to their own descendants. Thus the eligibility of the Saxe-Gessaphe line for the royal Saxon legacy would depend on the dynasticity of their mother's marriage.

== Lebanese heritage ==
The Afif family claimed to belong patrilineally to an ancient princely Lebanese Turkmen and Maronite Catholic family in what is now Lebanon. Afif, emir in Keserwan and grandson of the Lebanese emir Mansur 'Asaf bin Hasan (1522–1580), is said to be the ancestor of the Christianised cheikhs of Bkassine, from which Roberto Afif was assumed to descend.

According to the royal genealogical book series, L'Allemagne dynastique, Princess Anna maintains that her husband's family descend from Suleiman, who was granted the province of Keserwan, north of Beirut, in 1306 by the Mamluks. She further avers that Roberto's father, Alexander Afif (1883–1971), a lifelong resident of Beirut, was a knight of the Order of the Holy Sepulchre and was Prince of "Assaph" (or Afif-Gessaphe) in Lebanon.

Roberto emigrated to Mexico, obtained a law degree, and made his living as a businessman. The family was socially connected with some of the most prominent Mexican families. Although not as wealthy as they used to be, the family lives an upper middle class life in one of Mexico City's better neighbourhoods, Polanco.

Roberto's sister, Alexandra Afif, born in Beirut in 1919, morganatically married Prince Karl Anton of Hohenzollern (born 1922), in Rome in 1951. Prince Karl Anton was a nephew of Prince Friedrich Christian of Saxony, and is thus a first cousin of Margrave Maria Emanuel and Princess Anna.

== Designated heir ==
Prince Johannes of Saxe-Coburg and Gotha (1969–1987), of the Ernestine branch of the House of Wettin, was killed in a mountain climbing accident while still a youth, leaving his maternal uncle, Margrave Maria Emanuel, without a dynastic heir in the next generation of Wettins. However the eldest son of his sister Anna, Alexander Afif (b. Munich 12 February 1954), had married Princess Gisela of Bavaria (b. 10 September 1964) in 1987. In May 1997 the Margrave, who has upheld the dynasty's marital standards, recognized Alexander Afif as his heir. By formally adopting him two years later, the Margrave conferred upon Alexander the legal surname of Prinz von Sachsen (literally "Prince of Saxony"). Thus was created the family of Saxe-Gessaphe, a cognatic offshoot of the royal House of Wettin, with the approval of the Margrave Maria Emanuel and his siblings, making Alexander, his sons and his brothers, dynastically entitled and henceforth known as Prinzen von Sachsen-Gessaphe (Princes of Saxe-Gessaphe).

In the spring of 1997, the surviving male dynasts of the royal House (presumably Princes Albert, Dedo and Gero) met and consented to the designation of Alexander as dynastic heir in the event that none of them leave sons by dynastically valid marriages.

== Dispute ==
However Margrave Maria Emanuel's brother, Prince Albert, subsequently stated that he did not accept that decision as binding. He preferred that Rüdiger Prinz von Sachsen, the son of his first cousin, the late Prince Timo of Saxony (1923–1982), succeed to the royal Saxon claim. Since Rüdiger's mother was a commoner, retroactive "de-morganatization" of his parents' marriage was required to "dynasticize" his offspring, an act the agnates of the royal house who participated in the 1997 decision did not undertake. In some circumstances German princely law (Fürstenrecht) did allow a consensus of dynasts – or the last surviving male dynast – to dynasticize the issue of a morganatic marriage through unanimous and irrevocable action. Albert had become the last prince of the male line when he died on 6 October 2012.

However, Saxony's constitution and house law explicitly required that descendants of the royal house had to be born of "equal marriage" in order to succeed to the throne. Moreover, Fürstenrecht, derived from German legal customs, was considered subordinate in applicability to enacted law.
