= Maria Emanuel, Margrave of Meissen =

Maria Emanuel Prinz von Sachsen Herzog zu Sachsen

Head of the Royal House of Saxony
- Period: 9 August 1968 – 23 July 2012
- Predecessor: Friedrich Christian
- Successor: Albert (disputed); Alexander (disputed)
- Born: 31 January 1926; Prüfening Abbey, Regensburg, Upper Palatinate, Bavaria, Weimar Republic
- Died: 23 July 2012 (aged 86); La Tour-de-Peilz, Riviera-Pays-d'Enhaut District, Canton of Vaud, Switzerland
- Burial: 30 July 2012; Royal Chapel in Königskapelle in Karrösten in North Tyrol
- Spouse: Anastasia of Anhalt (m. 1962)
- House: Wettin
- Father: Friedrich Christian, Margrave of Meissen
- Mother: Princess Elisabeth Helene of Thurn and Taxis
- Religion: Roman Catholicism

Maria Emanuel Prinz von Sachsen Herzog zu Sachsen, also self-styled Markgraf von Meißen (Margrave of Meissen), (31 January 1926 – 23 July 2012) was the head of the House of Saxony.

== Life ==
Born at Prüfening Abbey in Regensburg, Bavaria, he was the eldest child of the then Hereditary Prince Frederick Christian of Saxony, later Margrave of Meissen, and Princess Elisabeth Helene of Thurn and Taxis. As German nobility had been constitutionally abolished in 1919, the hereditary titles of descendants of former nobility are unrecognized and instead incorporated into their surnames, hence "Maria Emanuel Prinz von Sachsen Herzog zu Sachsen".

At the age of 18, Maria Emanuel was imprisoned and sentenced to death for opposing Nazi rule. The death sentence, however, was commuted. He next had to escape from the approaching Soviets as his homeland, Saxony, became a part of communist East Germany in the Aftermath of World War II. After the war he moved to Switzerland where he began working in the financial services sector. Also being a talented painter Maria Emanuel had a number of his works exhibited.

Although Marie Vassiltchikov recounts in her book The Berlin Diaries 1940–45 the story of the 16-year-old Maria Emanuel paying her a visit to seek her help in finding a bride, as he felt it was his dynastic obligation to start a family early, Emanuel would not in fact marry until his 37th birthday. His wife was Anastasia (born 1940), daughter of Eduard, Duke of Anhalt; they married (civ.) on 22 June 1962 in La Tour-de-Peilz and (rel.) on 31 January 1963 in Vevey, Switzerland. They had no children.

Maria Emanuel became head of the former Royal House of Saxony upon the death of his father on 9 August 1968.

== Succession ==
As Maria Emanuel fathered no legitimate children, he had acknowledged as his eventual heir Alexander Prinz von Sachsen, the son of his sister Anna and her late husband Robert Afif, Prince of Gessaphe (or "Assaphe"/"Afif-Assaf", descendants of a Lebanese Christian family which ruled the Keserwan, a province in north of Beirut). Maria Emanuel adopted Alexander on 1 June 1999, who had married Gisela of Bavaria in 1987. In 1997 the surviving male dynasts of the Albertine line of Wettins consented to the Margrave's decision, Subsequently, his brother Albert stated that he no longer accepted the decision.

The royal line of the House of Wettin applies semi-salic law, which allows for inheritance through a female. Since the death of Maria Emanuel, if Albert was the last male dynast then this would lead firstly to the children of their sisters Maria Josepha (unmarried), Maria Anna, and Mathilde, but only Mathilde's marriage undisputedly met equality requirements and her only son died in 1987. Therefore, if the Gessaphe claim is invalid, the succession would pass to the issue of the Margrave's paternal aunts, who were Margarete Karola (1900–1962), Maria Alix (1901–1990) and Anna (1903–1976), all of whom left children. Margarete having been the eldest, the heir would be her grandson Karl Friedrich von Hohenzollern (born 1932), head of the princely line of the House of Hohenzollern.

Maria Emanuel's brother Albert, however, supported discarding equality requirements to allow his cousin Timo von Sachsen's morganatic son, Rüdiger von Sachsen (1953–2022) to eventually succeed. Rüdiger had, with his first wife Astrid Linke (1949–1989), three sons Daniel (born 1975), Arne (born 1977) and Nils (born 1978).

Although the Albertine Saxons consist only of the royal branch, there are several extant lines of the House of Wettin which ruled the various Ernestine duchies until 1918 (as well as the cadet branches of the Coburg line which held several royal crowns). In a joint statement of 23 June 2015, the heads of the three remaining branches of the senior Ernestine line of the House of Wettin, Michael Prinz von Sachsen-Weimar-Eisenach, Andreas Prinz von Sachsen-Coburg und Gotha and Konrad Prinz von Sachsen-Meiningen, declared that, according to the house law of the House of Wettin and to traditional princely succession rules, Alexander Afif, bearing the (legally unrecognized) name Prince of Saxony by adoption, was neither a member of nobility nor of the House of Wettin, nor had he succeeded Maria Emanuel as head of the Albertine branch (the Royal House of Saxony), nor was he entitled to style himself Margrave of Meissen.

== Ancestry ==
Ancestors of Maria Emanuel, Margrave of Meissen

8. George, King of Saxony
4. Frederick Augustus III of Saxony
9. Infanta Maria Anna of Portugal
2. Friedrich Christian, Margrave of Meissen
10. Ferdinand IV, Grand Duke of Tuscany
5. Archduchess Louise of Austria
11. Princess Alice of Bourbon-Parma
1. Maria Emanuel, Margrave of Meissen
12. Maximilian Anton, Hereditary Prince of Thurn and Taxis
6. Albert I, Prince of Thurn and Taxis
13. Duchess Helene in Bavaria
3. Princess Elisabeth Helene of Thurn and Taxis
14. Archduke Joseph Karl of Austria
7. Archduchess Margarethe Klementine of Austria
15. Princess Clotilde of Saxe-Coburg and Gotha

Maria Emanuel, Margrave of Meissen House of Wettin Born: 31 January 1926
Titles in pretence
Preceded by Friedrich Christian	— TITULAR — King of Saxony; 9 August 1968 – 23 July 2012; Reason for succession failure: Kingdom abolished in 1918	Succeeded by Albert (disputed)
Preceded by Friedrich Christian	— TITULAR — King of Saxony; 9 August 1968 – 23 July 2012; Reason for succession failure: Kingdom abolished in 1918	Succeeded by Alexander (disputed)
