= Friedrich Christian, Margrave of Meissen =

Friedrich Christian
- Margrave of Meissen
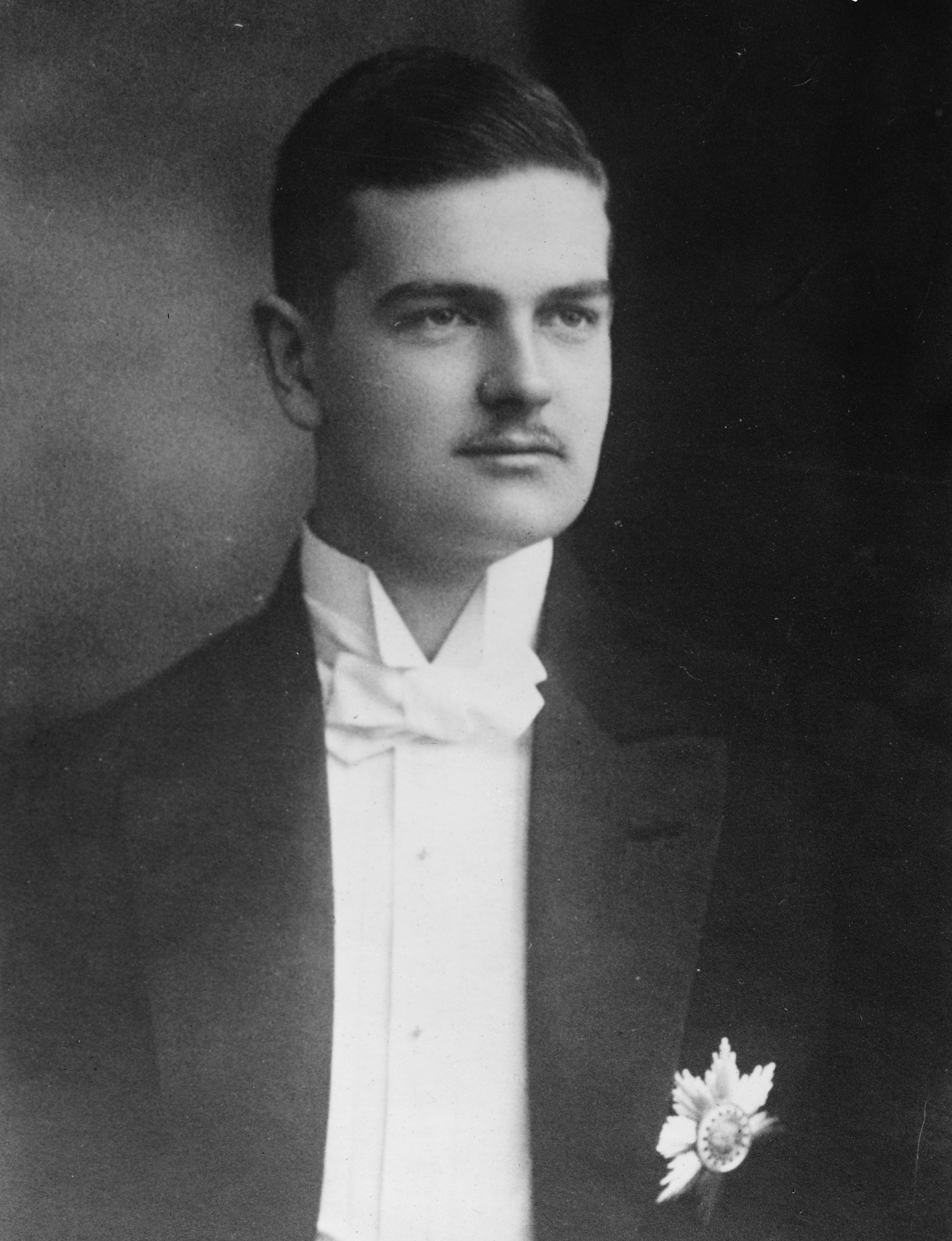

Head of the Royal House of Saxony
- Reign: 18 February 1932 – 9 August 1968
- Predecessor: Frederick Augustus III
- Successor: Maria Emanuel
- Born: 31 December 1893; Dresden, German Empire
- Died: 9 August 1968 (aged 74); Samedan, Switzerland
- Burial: Royal Chapel in Königskapelle in Karrösten in North Tyrol
- Spouse: Princess Elisabeth Helene of Thurn and Taxis (m. 1923)
- Issue: Maria Emanuel, Margrave of Meissen; Princess Maria Josepha; Princess Anna; Albert, Margrave of Meissen; Princess Mathilde
Names
- German: Friedrich Christian Albert Leopold Anno Sylvester Macarius; English: Frederick Christian Albert Leopold Anno Sylvester Macarius
- House: Wettin (Albertine line)
- Father: Frederick Augustus III of Saxony
- Mother: Archduchess Luise of Austria, Princess of Tuscany
- Religion: Roman Catholicism

Albert Leopold Friedrich Christian Sylvester Anno Macarius, Prince of Saxony, Duke of Saxony, Margrave of Meissen (31 December 1893 – 9 August 1968) was the second son of Frederick Augustus III, the last reigning king of Saxony before the abolition of the monarchy in 1918. Upon his father's death in 1932, he became the head of the Royal House of Saxony. He was Captain à la suite in the Royal Bulgarian Infantry, and Grand Master of the Order of the Rue Crown, and also a Knight in the Order of the Black Eagle and Knight Grand Cross in the Sovereign Military Order of Malta. As head of the Albertine branch of the House of Wettin after 1932, he styled himself as Friedrich Christian, Margrave of Meissen.

== Life ==
He was born in Dresden, as the second son of King Frederick Augustus III of Saxony and his wife Archduchess Luise, Princess of Tuscany. He was known as My Beloved Tia to his mother. As a small child, he once saw his aunt Mathilde stuff her plate and, shocked by her gluttony, exclaimed "Look Mamma, Aunt Mathilde has taken all the strawberries, see what a mess she's making!" His deaf grandfather then asked what Tia had said, and his mother lied for him. His parents divorced when he was nine years old, after the scandal of multiple extramarital affairs. His mother later wrote:

I think that my son Tia possesses many of the characteristics of our family. He was a pretty child; now he is a very handsome youth, and he was, and is now, warm-hearted and affectionate. I am told that he greatly resembles my father in the days of his youth, and I am glad of it.

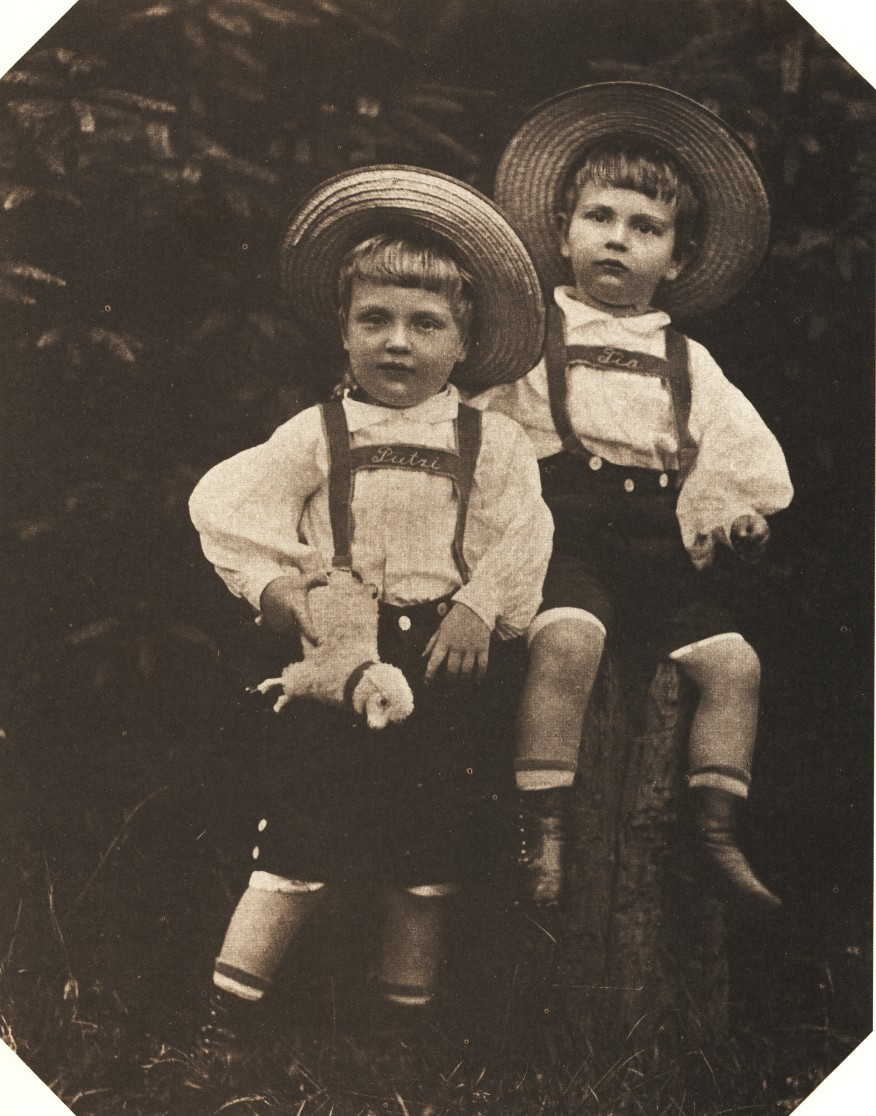
Friedrich Christian (right) and his brother George on a photograph by August Kotzsch in 1900

Friedrich Christian was made a lieutenant in the 1st Royal Saxon Leib-Grenadier Regiment No. 100 at the age of 10, in accordance a family tradition of the House of Wettin. In 1913, he studied at the Military Academy in Dresden. During World War I, he served General Staff on the Western Front. He received several medals for bravery. He was very gifted linguistically and was sent on diplomatic missions to King Alfonso XIII of Spain, to Sultan Mehmed V of Turkey and to Emperor Charles I of Austria.

In 1918, Friedrich Christian was one of several candidates to the prospective Kingdom of Lithuania, as well as the Kingdom of Poland. On 13 November of that year, his father abdicated following the German Empire's defeat in the World War I. Friedrich Christian led the Saxon army home from Belgium and France to Germany, where they demobilized in Fulda.

After the end of World War I, he turned to the study of law at the universities of Cologne, Freiburg, Wrocław and Würzburg. The subject of his PhD thesis was Nicholas of Cusa, who contributed significantly to the development of canon law in the late Middle Ages. While studying in Breslau, he was a member of the Catholic student union KDSt.V. Winfridia. However, he resigned his membership in 1928 or 1929, because of substantive disagreement.

On 9 February 1920, he joined the KDSt.V. Thuringia Würzburg. Here, he met Elisabeth Helene (1903–1976), a daughter of Albert, 8th Prince of Thurn and Taxis and his wife Archduchess Margarethe Klementine of Austria. Elisabeth Helene was an honorary chairwoman of the Thuringian Lady Student Federation. He married her on 16 June 1923 in Regensburg.

After completing his PhD, he became a private teacher of the history of art. Around this time, his father asked him to take up the management of the family holdings in Saxony and Silesia.

In 1923, his older brother Crown Prince Georg renounced his succession rights and joined the Jesuit Order. Friedrich Christian thus became heir apparent, and when his father died on 12 February 1932, he succeeded as Head of the Royal House of Saxony.

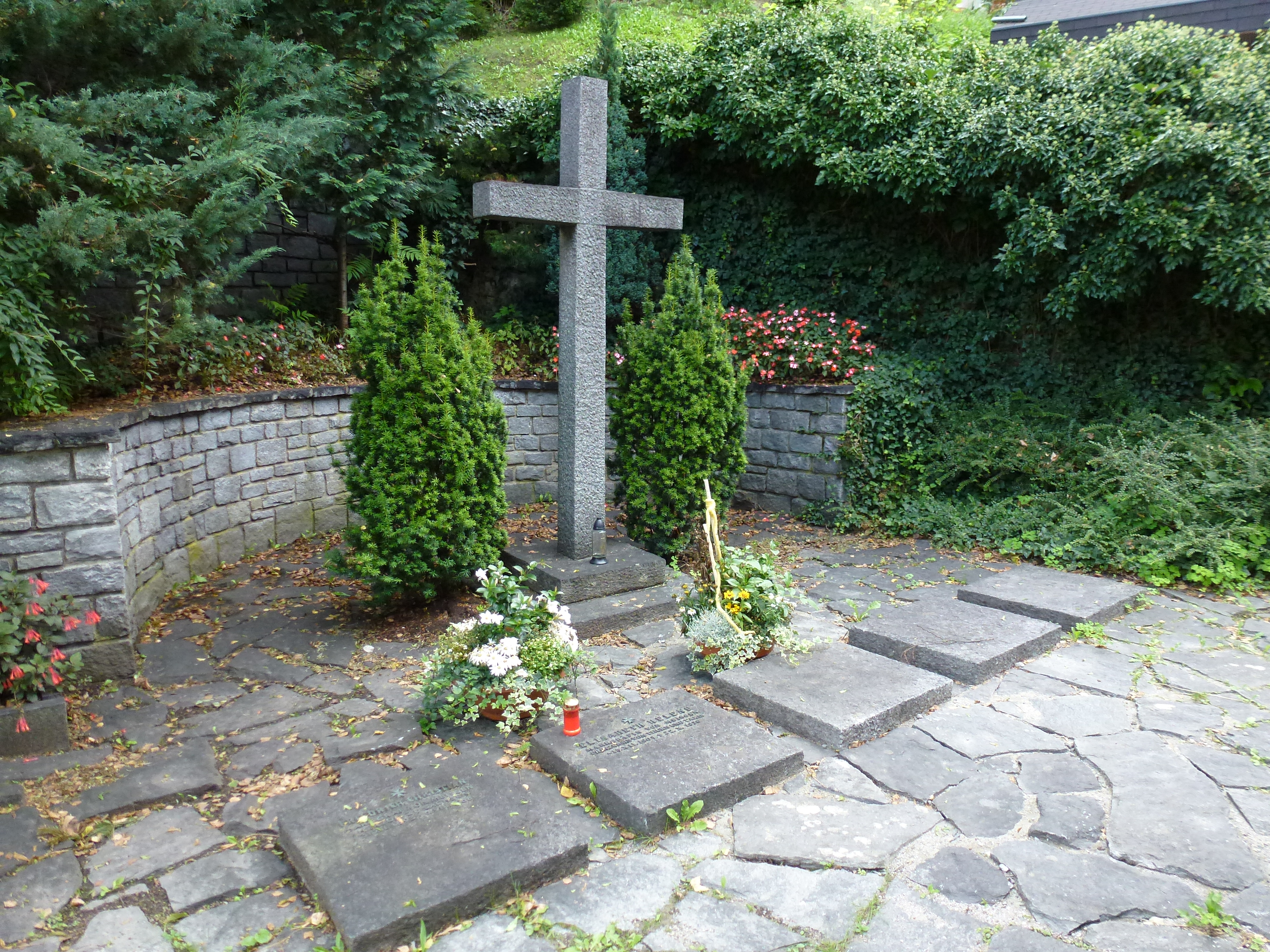
Grave site of the House of Wettin, outside the Royal Chapel in Königskapelle in Karrösten in North Tyrol

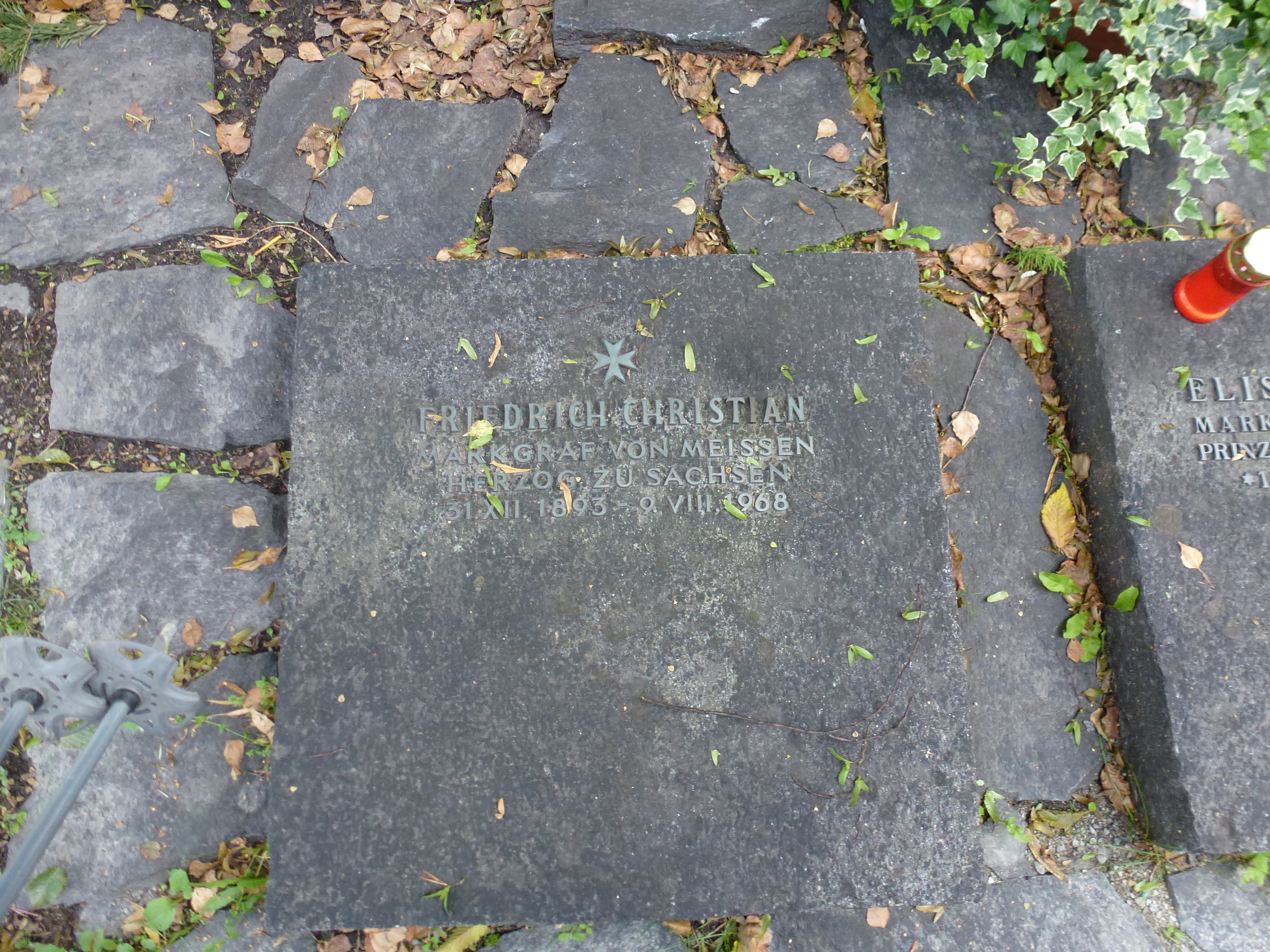
Grave stone for Friedrich Christian, Margrave of Meißen, Duke of Saxony

In 1937, the family moved to Wachwitz Castle in Dresden-Wachwitz, where they lived until 1945. The castle survived the bombing raids in 1945, and Christian Friedrich took in many survivors. Later that year, the family moved via Hof and Regensburg to Bregenz, where the two youngest children had been living since 1940. Their close connections to the French, they were able, for instance, to arrange permission for Richard Strauss to move to Switzerland.

In 1955, their relatives in the Thurn und Taxis family helped them find a new home in the Harlaching borough of Munich. Here Friedrich Christian, together with his sons Albert and Maria Emanuel, the chapter of the Military Order of St. Henry, the Association of People from Dresden, and the Munich chapter of the association of Heimatvertriebene founded the Studiengruppe für Sächsische Geschichte und Kultur e.V. ("Study group for Saxon history and culture"). This study group became one of the largest historical societies in West Germany. Had he been King he would have been known as Friedrich Christian I.

Friedrich Christian died on 9 August 1968 at Samedan. He was buried outside the Royal Chapel in Königskapelle in Karrösten in North Tyrol.

== Marriage and children ==
Friedrich Christian married on 16 June 1923, at Regensburg, Princess Elisabeth Helene of Thurn and Taxis (1903–1976), daughter of Albert, 8th Prince of Thurn and Taxis, and Archduchess Margarethe Klementine of Austria. They had five children:

- Maria Emanuel, Margrave of Meissen (1926–2012), married in 1962 Anastasia of Anhalt, without issue.
- Maria Josepha von Sachsen (1928–2018), not married, had a daughter.
- Anna von Sachsen (1929–2012), married in 1952 Roberto de Afif and had three sons, including Alexander Prinz von Sachsen.
- Albert, Margrave of Meissen (1934–2012), married in 1980 Elmira Henke, without issue.
- Mathilde von Sachsen (1936–2018), married in 1968 and divorced in 1993 Johannes Heinrich von Saxe-Coburg und Gotha-Koháry, and had one (now deceased) son.

== Ancestry ==
Ancestors of Friedrich Christian, Margrave of Meissen

8. John of Saxony
4. George of Saxony
9. Princess Amalie Auguste of Bavaria
2. Frederick Augustus III of Saxony
10. Ferdinand II of Portugal
5. Infanta Maria Anna of Portugal
11. Maria II of Portugal
1. Friedrich Christian, Margrave of Meissen
12. Leopold II, Grand Duke of Tuscany
6. Ferdinand IV, Grand Duke of Tuscany
13. Princess Maria Antonia of the Two Sicilies
3. Archduchess Louise of Austria
14. Charles III, Duke of Parma
7. Princess Alice of Bourbon-Parma
15. Princess Louise of Artois

== Sources ==
- Bäsig, Frank-Michael: Friedrich Christian Markgraf von Meißen, Raute Verlag, Dresden, 1995, ISBN 3-9804584-0-7
- Groß, Reiner (2007). Die Wettiner. Stuttgart: Kohlhammer Verlag.
- Albert Herzog zu Sachsen: Die Wettiner in Lebensbildern, Styria-Verlag, Graz, Vienna and Cologne, 1995, ISBN 3-222-12301-2
- Senn, Alfred Erich (1975) [1959]. The Emergence of Modern Lithuania. Greenwood Press. ISBN 0-8371-7780-4.

Friedrich Christian, Margrave of Meissen House of Wettin Born: 31 December 1893 Died: 9 August 1968
Titles in pretence
Preceded by Friedrich August III	— TITULAR — King of Saxony; 18 February 1932 – 9 August 1968; Reason for succession failure: Kingdom abolished in 1918	Succeeded by Maria Emanuel
