= Albert, Margrave of Meissen =

Albert, Margrave of Meissen may refer to:

- Albert I, Margrave of Meissen (1158–1195)
- Albert II, Margrave of Meissen (1240–1314)
- Albert III, Margrave of Meissen (1255–1308)
- Albert IV, Margrave of Meissen (1443–1500)
- Albert, Margrave of Meissen (1934–2012)

== See also ==
- Albert of Saxony (disambiguation)
