= King Albert =

King Albert may refer to:

- Albert I of Belgium (1875–1934)
- Albert II of Belgium (born 1934)
- Albert I of Germany (1255–1308)
- Albert II of Germany (1397–1439)
- Albert, King of Saxony (1828–1902)
- Albert of Sweden (c. 1338–1412)

== Other uses ==
- King Albert (card game), a solitaire card game
- Albert, King of Basil, a character in computer game The Legend of Dragoon
- King Albert Siegwald, a character in Mage & Demon Queen
- King Albert, a nickname for Albert King (1923–1992), blues guitarist & singer

== See also ==
- Prince Albert (disambiguation)
