= Duke Albrecht =

Duke Albrecht may refer to:

- Albert, Duke of Prussia (1490–1568)
- Albert, Duke of Luxembourg, Archduke of Austria (1559–1621)
- Albrecht, Duke of Saxe-Eisenach (1599-1644)
- Albrecht, Duke of Saxe-Coburg (1648–1699)
- Albert, Duke of Saxe-Teschen (1738–1822)
- Albrecht, Duke of Württemberg (1865–1939)
- Albrecht, Duke of Bavaria (1905–1996)
- Albert of Saxe-Wittenberg (disambiguation)
- Duke Albrecht of Silesia, character in the ballet Giselle
