= Princess Elisabeth Helene of Thurn and Taxis =

German nobility and titular queen consort (1903–1976)

Princess Elisabeth Helene
- Margravine of Meissen
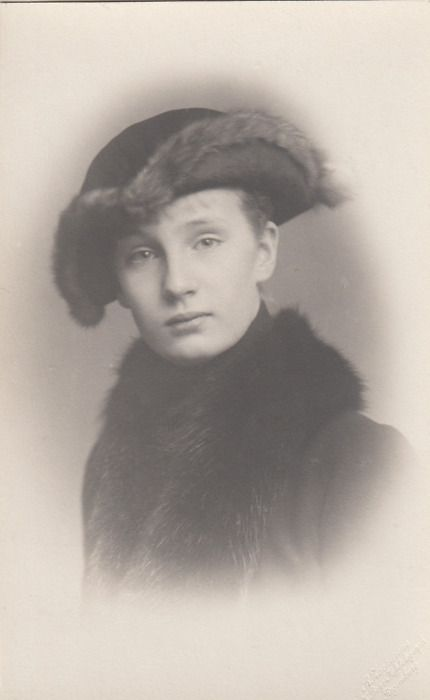
- Elisabeth Helene, 1920.

Consort of Head of the Royal House of Saxony
- Tenure: 18 February 1932 – 9 August 1968
- Born: 15 December 1903; Regensburg, Kingdom of Bavaria, German Empire
- Died: 22 October 1976 (aged 72); Wildbad Kreuth, Bavaria, West Germany
- Burial: Königskapelle Brennbichl, Tyrol, Austria
- Spouse: Friedrich Christian, Margrave of Meissen (m. 1923; died 1968)
- Issue Detail: Prince Maria Emanuel; Princess Maria Josepha; Princess Anna; Prince Albert; Princess Mathilde
Names
- Elisabeth Helene Maria Valerie Franziska Maximiliana Antonietta von Thurn und Taxis
- House: Thurn and Taxis (by birth); House of Wettin (by marriage)
- Father: Albert, 8th Prince of Thurn and Taxis
- Mother: Archduchess Margarethe Klementine of Austria

Princess Elisabeth Helene of Thurn and Taxis (German: Elisabeth Helene, Prinzessin von Thurn und Taxis; 15 December 1903 – 22 October 1976) was a German noblewoman by birth and became the titular Queen consort of Saxony through her marriage to Friedrich Christian, Margrave of Meissen.

== Early life ==
Princess Elisabeth Helene was born on 15 December 1903 at St. Emmeram Palace in Regensburg, Kingdom of Bavaria. She was the sixth child and the only daughter born to Albert, 8th Prince of Thurn and Taxis and Archduchess Margarethe Klementine of Austria. Raised within the residential court of her family at Regensburg alongside her seven brothers, she received a comprehensive private domestic education conducted by tutors that focused heavily on modern European languages and political history.

Her early youth was directly impacted by the geopolitical upheavals of World War I and the subsequent German Revolution of 1918–19, which led to the institutional dissolution of the German regional monarchies. Her upbringing inside the Thurn and Taxis household, which maintained extensive communication and administrative networks across Central Europe, provided her with continuous exposure to the aristocratic and political shifts of the era prior to her adulthood.

== Marriage and later life ==
During the early 1920s, Princess Elisabeth Helene met her future husband, Prince Friedrich Christian of Saxony, through regional aristocratic networks following the post-war restructuring of the German nobility. He was the second son of the last reigning King of Saxony, Frederick Augustus III, and Archduchess Luise of Austria, Princess of Tuscany. Following a period of courtship, the couple announced their formal engagement in 1922.

On 16 June 1923, Elisabeth Helene married Prince Friedrich Christian at St. Emmeram Palace in Regensburg. Upon her marriage, she relocated to Saxony and assumed the titular role of Margravine of Meissen within the non-reigning Albertine branch of the House of Wettin. In February 1945, following the severe destruction of the family's residential properties during the Allied bombing of Dresden, Elisabeth Helene organized and led the family's evacuation westward to evade the advance of the Soviet Red Army.

The family permanently relocated to Bavaria within the American occupation zone, losing their ancestral estates in eastern Germany. In the post-war decades, she engaged in the preservation of Saxon historical heritage and art collections. Elisabeth Helene died on 22 October 1976 at the age of 72 in Wildbad Kreuth, Bavaria, and was interred at the Königskapelle Brennbichl in Tyrol, Austria.

=== Issue ===
- Maria Emanuel, Margrave of Meissen (1926–2012), married Princess Anastasia of Anhalt in 1962 and without issue.
- Princess Maria Josepha of Saxony (1928–2018), died unmarried.
- Princess Anna of Saxony (1929–2012), married Roberto de Afif, Prince of Gessaphe in 1952 and had issue (including Alexander Prinz von Sachsen)
- Albert, Margrave of Meissen (1934–2012), married Elmira Henke in 1980 and without issue.
- Princess Mathilde of Saxony (1936–2018), married Prince Johannes Heinrich of Saxe-Coburg and Gotha-Koháry in 1968 and had issue.

== Ancestry ==
Ancestors of Princess Elisabeth Helene of Thurn and Taxis

8. Maximilian Karl, Prince of Thurn and Taxis
4. Maximilian Anton, Hereditary Prince of Thurn and Taxis
9. Baroness Wilhelmine of Dörnberg
2. Albert I, Prince of Thurn and Taxis
10. Duke Maximilian Joseph in Bavaria
5. Duchess Helene in Bavaria
11. Princess Ludovika of Bavaria
1. Princess Elisabeth Helene of Thurn and Taxis
12. Archduke Joseph, Palatine of Hungary
6. Archduke Joseph Karl, Palatine of Hungary
13. Duchess Maria Dorothea of Württemberg
3. Archduchess Margarethe Klementine of Austria
14. Prince August of Saxe-Coburg and Gotha
7. Princess Clotilde of Saxe-Coburg and Gotha
15. Princess Clémentine of Orléans

Princess Elisabeth Helene of Thurn and Taxis House of Thurn and Taxis Born: 15 December 1903 Died: 22 October 1976
Titles in pretence
Vacant Title last held by Carola of Vasa; As Queen consort	— TITULAR — queen consort titular of Saxony; 18 February 1932 – 9 August 1968; Reason for succession failure: Kingdom abolished in 1918	Succeeded by Princess Anastasia of Anhalt
