= Prince Albert =

Prince Albert most commonly refers to:

- Prince Albert of Saxe-Coburg and Gotha (1819–1861), consort of Queen Victoria
- Albert II, Prince of Monaco (born 1958), present head of state of Monaco

Prince Albert may also refer to:

== Royalty ==
- Albert I of Belgium (1875–1934), former head of state of Belgium
- Albert II of Belgium (born 1934), former head of state of Belgium
- Albert I, Prince of Monaco (1848–1922), former head of state of Monaco
- Prince Albert of Prussia (1809–1872)
- Prince Albert of Prussia (1837–1906)
- Prince Albert of Saxe-Altenburg
- Albert of Saxony (disambiguation), several individuals
- Albert, Margrave of Meissen (1934–2012)
- Albert Casimir, Duke of Teschen
- Albert, Prince of Schwarzburg-Rudolstadt (1798–1869), former head of state of Schwarzburg-Rudolstadt
- Albert I, Prince of Thurn and Taxis (1867–1952)
- Albert II, Prince of Thurn and Taxis (born 1983)
- Albert Edward, Prince of Wales (1841–1910), later King Edward VII of the United Kingdom, son of Albert and Victoria
- Prince Albert Victor, Duke of Clarence and Avondale (1864–1892), son of Edward VII
- Prince Albert, Duke of York (1895–1952), later King George VI of the United Kingdom, grandson of Edward VII
- Albert Kamehameha (1858–1862), Crown Prince of Hawaii during his father King Kamehameha IV's reign

== Places ==
=== Canada ===
- Prince Albert, Saskatchewan
- Prince Albert, Nova Scotia
- Prince Albert (federal electoral district), federal electoral district
- Prince Albert (provincial electoral district), Saskatchewan provincial electoral district
- Prince Albert National Park, Saskatchewan
- Rural Municipality of Prince Albert No. 461, Saskatchewan
- Prince Albert Peninsula, Northwest Territories
  - Prince Albert Impact Crater, or Tunnunik impact crater, found on that peninsula

=== South Africa ===
- Prince Albert, Western Cape, a small town in South Africa

== Sports ==
- "Prince Albert", a stage name of Matt Bloom (born 1972), professional wrestler
- John "Prince" Albert (born 1986), professional MMA fighter

== Other uses ==
- Prince Albert (genital piercing)
- Prince Albert (tobacco), a brand of pipe tobacco
- Prince Albert, a novel by Richard Church
- Prince Albert coat, a double-breasted frock coat
- Prince Albert grape, another name for the Trollinger grape variety
- Prince Albert (HBC vessel), operated by the Hudson's Bay Company from 1841–1856, see Hudson's Bay Company vessels
- The Prince Albert, Brighton, England, a pub

== See also ==
- Albert of the United Kingdom (disambiguation)
