= Mary II (disambiguation) =

Mary II (1662–1694) was Queen of England, Scotland and Ireland from 1689 until her death.

Mary II or 2 may also refer to:

- Mary II, Countess of Menteith (fl. 1330 – c. 1360)
- Mary II of Portugal (1819–1853)
- Mary ʻĪʻī (c. 1833–1853)
- Queen Mary 2, an ocean liner that entered service in 2004
- Mary-2 airbase, a Soviet-era airbase used by the Turkmen Air Force
- Mary 2.0, German religious movement

== See also ==
- Queen Mary (disambiguation)
- William and Mary (disambiguation)
