= William and Mary =

William and Mary most commonly refers to the joint reign of:

- William III of England (1650–1702; r. 1689–1702), King of England

and

- Mary II (1662–1694; r. 1689–1694), Queen of England

William and Mary may also refer to:

== Arts and entertainment ==
- William and Mary style, an 18th-century furniture design under the reign of William and Mary
- "William and Mary" (short story), by Roald Dahl, 1959
- William and Mary (TV series), a British drama, 2003

== Organizations ==
- College of William & Mary, Williamsburg, Virginia, United States
  - William & Mary Law School
  - William & Mary Pep Band
  - William & Mary Police Department
  - William & Mary Tribe, the athletic teams of the College of William & Mary

== Ships ==
- HMS Pitt (1805), originally called William and Mary
- HMY William & Mary (disambiguation), various ships

== Other uses ==
- Fort William and Mary, New Castle, New Hampshire, United States

== See also ==
- William (disambiguation)
- Mary (disambiguation)
- "Mary and Willie", a song by K. T. Oslin, 1991
- Mary II (disambiguation)
- SS William and Mary Victory
- Victoria and Albert (disambiguation)
- William and Catherine (disambiguation)
- William and Mary Quarterly, an American history journal
