= Albert of the United Kingdom (disambiguation) =

Albert of the United Kingdom (1819–1861) was the consort of Queen Victoria.

Albert of the United Kingdom or Albert of Great Britain may also refer to:

- Edward VII (1841–1910; r. 1901–1910), King of the United Kingdom and called Albert Edward, Prince of Wales, before accession
- Prince Albert Victor, Duke of Clarence and Avondale (1864–1892), eldest child of Albert Edward, Prince of Wales
- George VI (1895–1952; r. 1936–1952), King of the United Kingdom and called Prince Albert, Duke of York, before accession

== See also ==
- George V (George Frederick Ernest Albert; 1865–1936; r. 1910–1936), King of the United Kingdom
- Edward VIII (Edward Albert Christian George Andrew Patrick David; 1894–1972; r. 1936), King of the United Kingdom
- Prince Albert (disambiguation)
- Prince consort
- Victoria and Albert (disambiguation)
