= Victoria and Albert =

Victoria and Albert most commonly refers to:

- Queen Victoria (1819–1901; r. 1837–1901), Queen of the United Kingdom
- Prince Albert of Saxe-Coburg and Gotha (1819–1861), consort of Queen Victoria

Victoria and Albert, Albert and Victoria, or Victoria & Albert's may also refer to:

- Albert and Victoria, a British sitcom, 1970
- Dr. Bhau Daji Lad Museum, Mumbai, India; called the Victoria and Albert Museum from 1872 to 1975
- Electoral district of Victoria and Albert, South Australia, Australia
- HMY Victoria and Albert (disambiguation), various ships
- Victoria and Albert Museum, London, England, United Kingdom
- Victoria & Albert (TV serial), a British-American miniseries, 2001
- Victoria & Albert's, a restaurant in Walt Disney World, Florida, United States

== See also ==
- Victoria (disambiguation)
- Albert (disambiguation)
- Albert of the United Kingdom (disambiguation)
- Queen Victoria (disambiguation)
- Wedding of Queen Victoria and Prince Albert
- William and Catherine (disambiguation)
- William and Mary (disambiguation)
