= Albert of Saxony =

Albert of Saxony may refer to:

- Albert, King of Saxony (1828–1902)
- Albert I, Duke of Saxony (ca. 1175–1260)
- Albert II, Duke of Saxony (ca. 1250–1298)
- Albert III, Duke of Saxony (1443–1500)
- Prince Albert of Saxony, Duke of Teschen (1738–1822)
- Albert von Sachsen (born 1934) (1934–2012)
- Albert of Saxony (philosopher) (1316–1390)
- Albert of Saxe-Wittenberg (disambiguation)
- Albert of Saxe-Altenburg (1843–1902)
- Albert of Saxe-Coburg and Gotha (1819–1861)
- Prince Albert of Saxony (1875–1900)
