= Alexander Prinz von Sachsen =

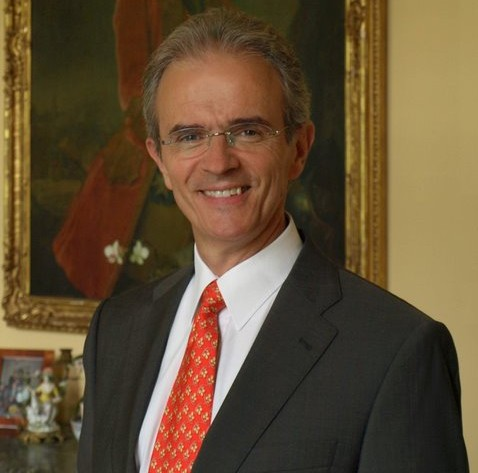
- Alexander in 2011

Head of the Royal House of Saxony (disputed)
- Tenure: 23 July 2012 – present
- Predecessor: Maria Emanuel
- Born: Alexander Afif; 12 February 1953 (age 73); Munich, Bavaria, Germany
- Spouse: Gisela of Bavaria (m. 1987)
- Issue: Prince Georg Philipp; Prince Mauricio Gabriel; Prince Paul Clemens; Princess Maria Teresita
- House: Saxe-Gessaphe
- Father: Roberto Afif
- Mother: Princess Anna of Saxony
- Religion: Catholic

Alexander Prinz von Sachsen (born Alexander Afif on 12 February 1953; legally Alexander Prinz von Sachsen-Gessaphe, sometimes referred to as Alexander Prinz von Sachsen Herzog zu Sachsen) is a German businessman and the nephew, adopted son and heir of Maria Emanuel, Margrave of Meissen. Following the death of Maria Emanuel in July 2012 he assumed the headship of the House of Saxony, based on a 1997 agreement that named him heir, but which was repudiated a few years later by a number of signatories. His claim is disputed by his cousin Daniel von Sachsen.

== Early life and career ==
Born in Munich as Alexander Afif, he is the eldest son of Roberto Afif, Dr. jur. (mentioned as Catholic nobleman of the Assaf dynasty from Lebanon) and Anna of Saxony. At birth Alexander did not possess rights to the abolished throne of Saxony (which was regulated by semi-Salic succession) as his parents’ marriage did not meet the equal marriage requirements of the Saxon house law. Alexander legally assumed the surname Prinz von Sachsen-Gessaphe on 25 August 1972; as German nobility had been constitutionally abolished in 1919, the hereditary titles of descendants of former nobility are unrecognized and instead incorporated into their surnames.

Alexander grew up mainly in Mexico eventually taking over the running of a logistics company from his father. He married Gisela of Bavaria (b. 10 September 1964), a granddaughter of Prince Franz of Bavaria, firstly civilly at Mexico City 3 April 1987 and then religiously at Andechs Abbey 29 August 1987. They have four children.

In February 2003 Alexander began to work in attracting worldwide investors to Saxony, he also worked as an advisor to Georg Milbradt, Minister-President of Free State of Saxony, leaving with Milbradt in 2008. In the Summer of 2004, he received German citizenship. In 2009 he left Germany to resume living in North America (Mexico). In July 2012 Alexander gave a controversial interview where he criticised what he saw as ingratitude and a lack of etiquette on the part of the people in the former East Germany (which includes Saxony).

== (Formerly) Royal House of Saxony ==
The headship of the Royal House of Saxony is a matter of internal dispute. The conflict stems from the fact that the last undisputed head of the house Maria Emanuel, Margrave of Meissen, and his brother Albert had no children whereas their first cousin, Timo, had children (including Rüdiger) who were not deemed members of the Royal House of Saxony because of Timo's unequal marriage.

The first designated dynastic heir of Maria Emanuel was his and Albert's nephew Johannes von Saxe-Coburg und Gotha-Koháry, only son of their youngest sister Mathilde von Sachsen by her marriage to Johannes Heinrich von Saxe-Coburg und Gotha, dynast of a ducal branch of the House of Wettin senior patrilineally to the royal branch. After the early death of Johannes, the childless Maria Emanuel then considered as potential heir another nephew, Alexander Afif, the eldest son of his elder sister Anna of Saxony and her husband Roberto Afif, despite the Afif-Saxony marriage being contrary to the traditional laws of the House of Saxony which required equal marriages for descendants to inherit dynastic rights. On 14 May 1997 the Margrave of Meissen proposed his nephew Alexander Afif as heir and drew up a document that was signed by the other male and female members of the Royal House (including previously non-dynastic spouses of princes) setting out that Alexander would succeed on his death. The document was signed by: Anastasia, Margravine of Meissen; Albert and his wife, née Elmira Henke; Dedo (for himself, his brother Gero and for their stepmother née Virginia Dulon - his brother Timo had died in 1982); Maria Josepha, Anna and Mathilde; and Timo's third wife, née Erina Eilts. Two years later on 1 July 1999 the Margrave adopted his nephew Alexander Afif, who had used the title-in-pretense Alexander, Prince of Saxe-Gessaphe since 1972, based on his assumed patrilineal descent from the once-sovereign Lebanese Assaf (or Gessaphe) dynasty, Emirs of Keserwan, through the Maronite Catholic Cheikhs Afif of Bkassine.

The 1997 agreement proved to be controversial and in the summer of 2002 three of the signatories, Albert, Dedo and Gero (the latter consented via proxy but had not personally signed the document) retracted their support for the agreement. The following year Albert wrote that it is through Rüdiger and his sons that the direct line of the Albertine branch of the House of Wettin should continue, and thus avoid becoming extinct. Until his death, however, the Margrave, as head of the former dynasty, continued to regard his nephew and adopted son, Alexander, as the contractual heir entitled to succeed.

Immediately following the death of Maria Emanuel in July 2012, Alexander, citing the 1997 agreement, assumed automatically the title of Margrave of Meissen. Albert assumed also, unilaterally, the position of head of the Royal House of Saxony. However, this claim is contradicted by Albert himself in his final interview, given after the funeral, where he states that he needs recognition as Margrave of Meissen. Albert, Margrave of Meissen died at a hospital in Munich on 6 October 2012 at the age of 77.

Prior to the requiem for Margrave Maria Emanuel, Rüdiger, who had sought to be recognised by his cousin as a dynastic member of the House of Saxony but was refused, conducted a demonstration outside the cathedral with Saxon royalists in protest against the late Margrave Maria Emanuel's decision to appoint Alexander as heir. The family website of Rüdiger states prior to his death Albert determined Rüdiger to be his successor and instituted a clear succession plan. On this basis following Albert's death Rüdiger assumed the headship of the house, having stated "We will not accept Prince Alexander as head of house".

In a joint statement of 23 June 2015, the heads of the three remaining branches of the senior Ernestine line of the House of Wettin, Michael Prinz von Sachsen-Weimar-Eisenach, Andreas Prinz von Sachsen-Coburg und Gotha and Konrad Prinz von Sachsen-Meiningen, declared that, according to the historical princely and house laws of the House of Wettin, Alexander Prinz von Sachsen (formerly Alexander Afif, aka Alexander Prinz von Sachsen-Gessaphe), bearing the name Prinz von Sachsen by adoption, is not a noble and bears a non-noble name, is not a member of the House of Wettin, nor did he succeed the Margrave Maria Emanuel of Meissen, Prince and Duke of Saxony, at his death on 23 July 2012 as head of the Albertine branch of the House of Wettin (the Royal House of Saxony), nor have the right to assume the title of the Head of House, Margrave of Meissen."

Alexander Prinz von Sachsen House of Saxe-Gessaphe Cadet branch of the House of Wettin Born: 12 February 1953
Titles in pretence
Preceded by Maria Emanuel	— TITULAR — King of Saxony disputed with Albert (2012) disputed with Rüdiger (2012 - 2022) disputed with Daniel (2022 - present); 23 July 2012 - present Reason for succession failure: Kingdom abolished in 1918	Incumbent; Heir: Prince Georg Philipp of Saxe-Gessaphe
