= Albert von Sachsen (born 1934) =

Albert
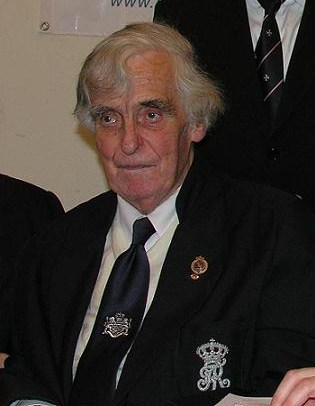
- The Margrave of Meissen

Head of the Royal House of Saxony (disputed)
- Tenure: 23 July 2012 – 6 October 2012
- Predecessor: Maria Emanuel
- Successor: Rüdiger
- Born: 30 November 1934; Bamberg, Upper Franconia, Bavaria, Nazi Germany
- Died: 6 October 2012 (aged 77); Munich, Bavaria, Germany
- Burial: 12 October 2012; Friedrichstadt (Dresden)
- Spouse: Elmira Henke (m. 1980)
Names
- German: Albert Joseph Maria Franz-Xaver; English: Albert Joseph Maria Francis-Xavier
- House: Wettin (Albertine line)
- Father: Friedrich Christian, Margrave of Meissen
- Mother: Princess Elisabeth Helene of Thurn and Taxis
- Religion: Roman Catholicism

Albrecht (Albert) Joseph Maria Franz-Xaver Prinz von Sachsen Herzog zu Sachsen (30 November 1934 – 6 October 2012), also self-styled Markgraf von Meißen (Margrave of Meissen) was the head of the Royal House of Saxony and a German historian. The fourth child and youngest son of Friedrich Christian, Margrave of Meissen, and Princess Elisabeth Helene of Thurn and Taxis, he was the younger brother of Maria Emanuel, Margrave of Meissen, who was his predecessor as head of the Royal House of Saxony.

== Life ==
Albert received his secondary education at the Federal Gymnasium in Bregenz, Austria. He passed his matura in 1954. His parents and their children then moved to Munich, with support from his mother's relatives from the Thurn und Taxis dynasty. In Munich, Albert studied at LMU Munich. He initially studied macroeconomics, and later switched to history and ethnography. On 13 February 1961, he received his PhD for a thesis on his great-great-grandfather, King John of Saxony, and his reform of Saxon commercial law.

On 30 January 1960 the Studiengruppe für Sächsische Geschichte und Kultur e.V. ("Study group for Saxon history and culture") was founded by Albert together with his parents, his elder brother Maria Emanuel, some other Saxon nobles, the Chapter of the Military Order of St. Henry, the chapter of the association of people from Dresden, and the association of Heimatvertriebene in the history department of LMU Munich. This study group became one of the largest historical societies in West Germany. After completing his studies, Albert worked as a historian and referent. He studied the history of the Duchy of Saxony and the Kingdom of Saxony, in particular the relationship of Saxony to Bavaria.

At times, he was vice president of the Bund der Mitteldeutschen ("Association of Central Germans"). In 1972, he joined the Mitteldeutschen Kulturrat e.V. ("Central German Culture Council"), where he represented the interests of the Free State of Saxony.

In the summer of 1982, he was allowed to visit Saxony for the first time since his youth. He visited again in 1983 and 1985. He was then not allowed to enter the German Democratic Republic again, for unknown reasons, until 1989/1990. On 22 January 1990, he participated in a Monday demonstration in Dresden and was unexpectedly asked to address the crowd. He told his audience about their task to rebuild Saxony and ended with the words "Long live Saxony, Germany, Europe and the western-Christian culture."

In the subsequent elections for the Saxon parliament, he ran as a DSU candidate; he was not elected, nor did the newly elected government of Saxony employ him as an advisor. After the German reunification, he has tried to reclaim some of his family's former possessions.

== Marriage ==
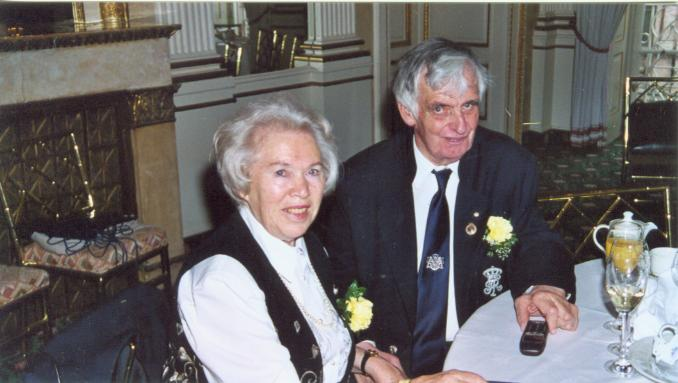
The Margrave and Margravine of Meissen

Albert morganatically wed Elmira Henke in a civil ceremony on 10 April 1980 in Munich, and in a religious ceremony on 12 April 1980, in the Theatine Church, also in Munich. Elmira assisted Albert with his scientific and historical studies; she specialized in ethnographic topics. Albert and Elmira had no children.

== Succession ==
The headship of the Royal House of Saxony is a matter of dispute in the Saxon Royal Family. The conflict stems from the fact that the last undisputed head of the house Maria Emanuel, Margrave of Meissen, and the other princes of his generation either had no children or, in the case of Prince Timo, had children (including Prince Rüdiger of Saxony) who were deemed not to be members of the Royal House of Saxony.

The first designated dynastic heir of Maria Emanuel was his and Albert's nephew Prince Johannes of Saxe-Coburg and Gotha, only son of their youngest sister Princess Mathilde of Saxony by her marriage to Prince Johannes Heinrich of Saxe-Coburg and Gotha, dynast of a ducal branch of the House of Wettin senior patrilineally to the royal branch. After the early death of Prince Johannes, the heirless Maria Emanuel then considered as potential heir another nephew, Alexander Afif, the eldest son of Princess Anna of Saxony and her husband Roberto Afif, despite the Afif-Saxony marriage being contrary to the traditional laws of the House of Saxony which required equal marriages for descendants to inherit dynastic rights. On 14 May 1997 the Margrave of Meissen proposed his nephew Alexander Afif as heir and drew up a document that was signed by the other male and female members of the Royal House (including previously non-dynastic spouses of princes) setting out that Alexander would succeed on his death. The document was signed by: Anastasia, Margravine of Meissen, Prince Albert and his wife, née Elmira Henke, Prince Dedo (for himself, for his brother Prince Gero and for their stepmother née Virginia Dulon – his brother Prince Timo had died in 1982), the Princesses Maria Josepha, Anna and Mathilde, and Prince Timo's third wife, née Erina Eilts. Two years later on 1 July 1999 the Margrave adopted his nephew Alexander Afif, who had used the title Alexander, Prince of Saxe-Gessaphe since 1972, based on his patrilineal descent from the once-sovereign Lebanese "Afif" (or Gessaphe) dynasty.

The 1997 agreement proved to be controversial and in the summer of 2002 three of the signatories, Princes Albert, Dedo and Gero (the latter consented via proxy but had not personally signed the document) retracted their support for the agreement. The following year Prince Albert wrote that it is through Prince Rüdiger and his sons that the direct line of the Albertine branch of the House of Wettin will continue, and thus avoid becoming extinct. Until his death, however, the Margrave, as head of the former dynasty, continued to regard his nephew and adopted son, Prince Alexander, as the contractual heir entitled to succeed.

Immediately following the death of Maria Emanuel in July 2012, Prince Albert assumed the position of head of the Royal House of Saxony. Albert, Margrave of Meissen died at a hospital in Munich on 6 October 2012 at the age of 77.

Prior to the requiem for Margrave Maria Emanuel, Rüdiger, who had sought to be recognised by his cousin as a dynastic member of the House of Saxony but was refused, conducted a demonstration outside the cathedral with Saxon royalists in protest against the late Margrave Maria Emanuel's decision to appoint Alexander as heir. The family website of Prince Rüdiger states that, prior to his death, Albert determined Rüdiger to be his successor and instituted a clear succession plan. On this basis following Albert's death Prince Rüdiger assumed the headship of the house.

== Ancestry ==
Ancestors of Albert von Sachsen (born 1934)

8. George of Saxony
4. Frederick Augustus III of Saxony
9. Infanta Maria Ana of Portugal
2. Friedrich Christian, Margrave of Meissen
10. Ferdinand IV, Grand Duke of Tuscany
5. Archduchess Louise of Austria
11. Princess Alice of Bourbon-Parma
1. Prince Albert of Saxony
12. Maximilian Anton, Hereditary Prince of Thurn and Taxis
6. Albert I, Prince of Thurn and Taxis
13. Duchess Helene in Bavaria
3. Princess Elisabeth Helene of Thurn and Taxis
14. Archduke Joseph Karl, Palatine of Hungary
7. Archduchess Margarethe Klementine of Austria
15. Princess Clotilde of Saxe-Coburg and Gotha

== Publications by Prince Albert ==
- Die Reform der sächsischen Gewerbegesetzgebung (1840–1861), PhD thesis, Ludwig-Maximilians-Universität München, 1970
- Dresden, Weidlich, Frankfurt 1974, ISBN 3-8035-0474-0
- Leipzig und das Leipziger Land, Weidlich, Frankfurt 1976, ISBN 3-8035-8511-2
- Die Albertinischen Wettiner — Geschichte des Sächsischen Königshauses (1763–1932), 1st ed., St.-Otto-Verlag, Bamberg, 1989, ISBN 3-87693-211-4; 2d ed., Gräfelfing, 1992, ISBN 3-87014-020-8
- Weihnacht in Sachsen, Bayerische Verlagsanstalt, Munich, 1992, ISBN 3-87052-799-4
- Die Wettiner in Lebensbildern, Styria-Verlag, Vienna, Graz and Cologne, 1995, ISBN 3-222-12301-2
- Die Wettiner in Sachsen und Thüringen, König-Friedrich-August-Institut, Dresden, 1996
- Das Haus Wettin und die Beziehungen zum Haus Nassau-Luxemburg, Bad Ems, 2003
- Bayern & Sachsen — gemeinsame Geschichte, Kunst, Kultur und Wirtschaft (with Elmira of Saxony and Walter Beck), Universitas, Munich, 2004, ISBN 3-8004-1462-7
- Königreich Sachsen: 1806–1918; Traditionen in Schwarz und Gelb, Verlagsgesellschaft Marienberg, 2007, ISBN 978-3-931770-67-9

Albert von Sachsen (born 1934) House of Wettin Born: 30 November 1934 Died: 6 October 2012
Titles in pretence
Preceded by Maria Emanuel	— TITULAR — King of Saxony disputed with Alexander; 23 July 2012 – 6 October 2012; Reason for succession failure: Kingdom abolished in 1918	Succeeded by Rüdiger
