= Albert of Saxe-Wittenberg =

Albert of Saxe-Wittenberg may refer to:

- Albert II, Duke of Saxe-Wittenberg (1250–1298), first duke of Saxe-Wittenberg after its definite division from the Duchy of Saxony in 1296
- Albert, Bishop of Passau (died 1342), son of Albert II, Duke of Saxe-Wittenberg
- Albert, Count of Anhalt (died 1329), son of Rudolf I, Duke of Saxe-Wittenberg
- Albert of Saxe-Wittenberg, Duke of Lüneburg (died 1385), competed with Brunswick in Lüneburg War of Succession
- Albert III, Duke of Saxe-Wittenberg (1375–1422), last in the Ascanian line of Saxe-Wittenberg
