= Karrösten =

- Municipality
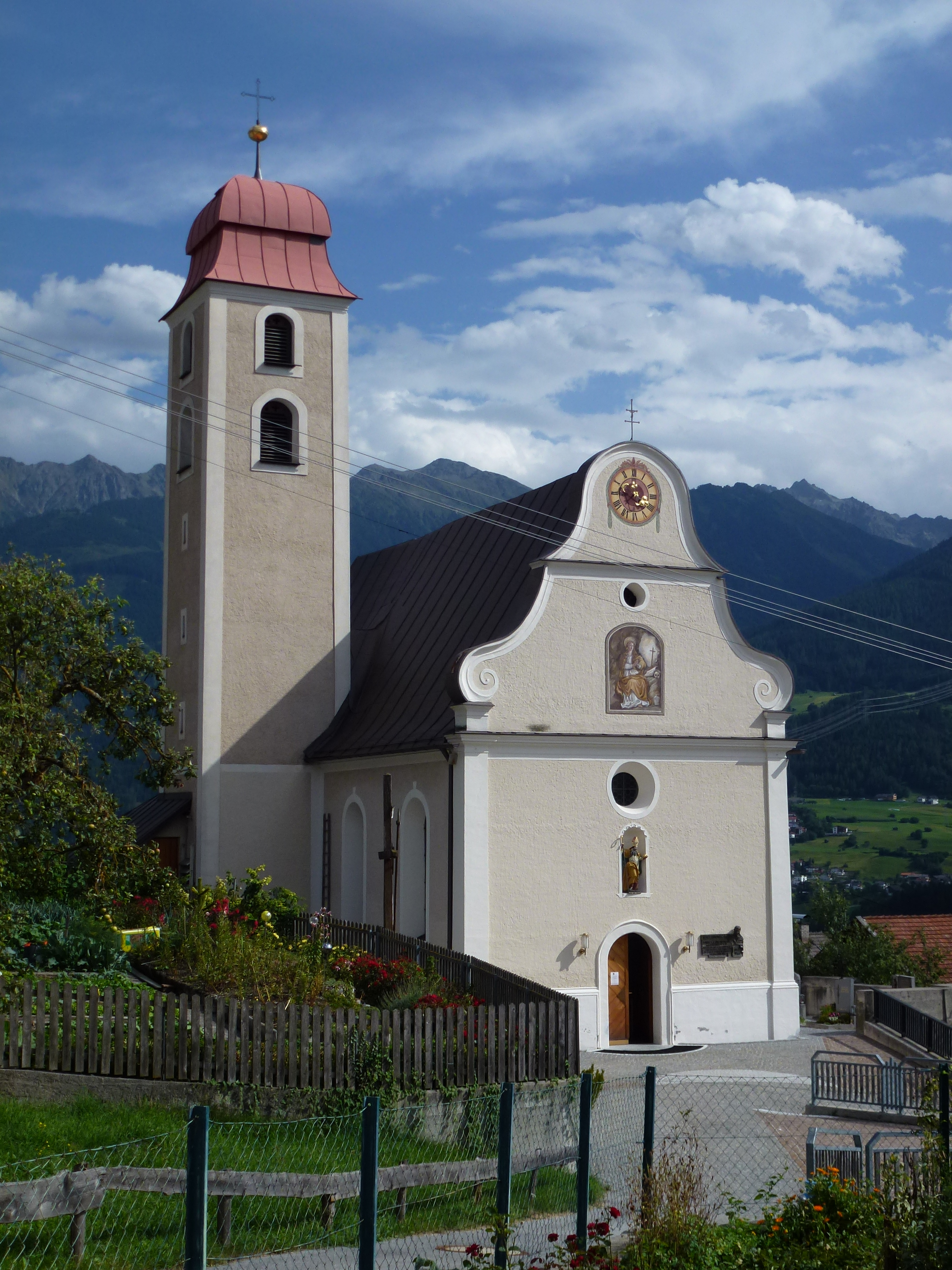
- Catholic church in Karrösten

- Coat of arms

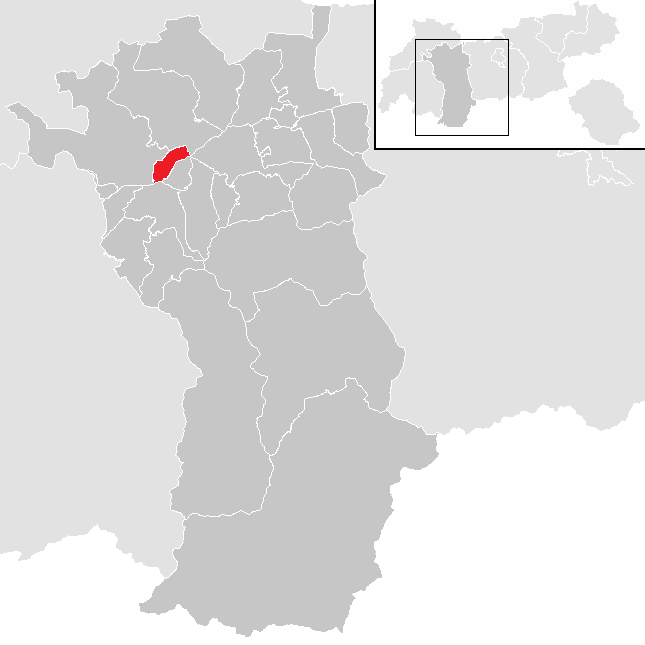
- Location in the district

- Location within Austria
- Coordinates: 47°13′00″N 10°46′00″E
- Country: Austria
- State: Tyrol
- District: Imst

Government
  - Mayor: Oswald Krabacher (ÖVP)

Area
  - Total: 7.91 km^{2} (3.05 sq mi)
- Elevation: 918 m (3,012 ft)

Population (2021)
  - Total: 686
  - Density: 86.7/km^{2} (225/sq mi)
- Time zone: UTC+1 (CET)
  - Summer (DST): UTC+2 (CEST)
- Postal code: 6463
- Area code: +43 5412
- Vehicle registration: IM
- Website: Gemeinde Karrösten

Karrösten is a municipality and a village in the district of Imst, located 1.3 km east of Imst. The village was founded because of mining in the 16th century. Fruits and maize as well as sweet chestnuts flourish on the slopes.

== Population ==
Historical population
Year	Pop.	±%
1869	342	—
1880	325	−5.0%
1890	326	+0.3%
1900	353	+8.3%
1910	358	+1.4%
1923	345	−3.6%
1934	376	+9.0%
1939	405	+7.7%
1951	416	+2.7%
1961	484	+16.3%
1971	500	+3.3%
1981	564	+12.8%
1991	647	+14.7%
2001	685	+5.9%
2011	680	−0.7%
