= Frederick Augustus III of Saxony =

King of Saxony from 1904 to 1918

Frederick Augustus III
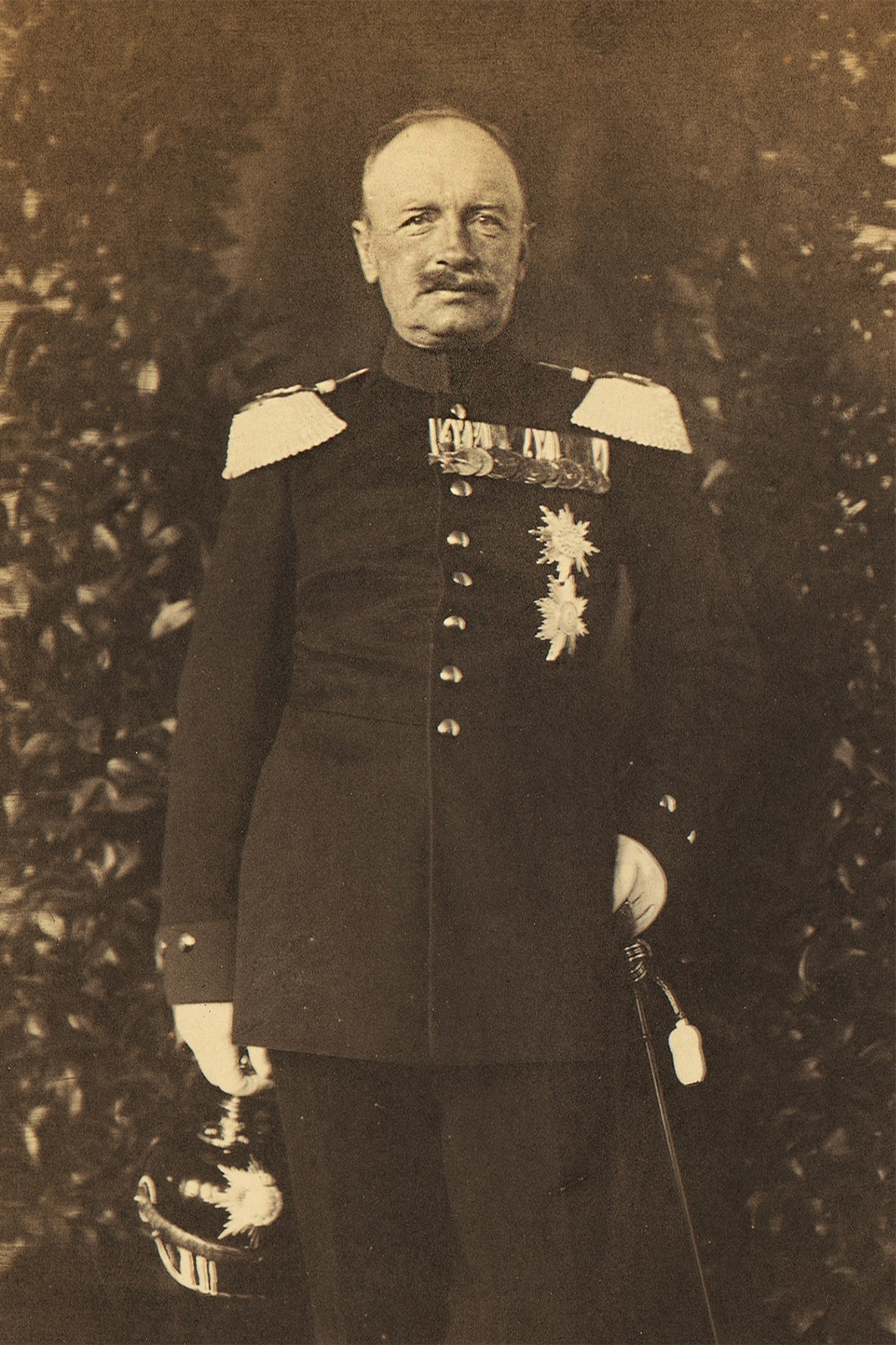
- Formal portrait, 1913

King of Saxony
- Reign: 15 October 1904 – 13 November 1918
- Predecessor: George
- Successor: Monarchy abolished
- Born: 25 May 1865; Dresden, Kingdom of Saxony
- Died: 18 February 1932 (aged 66); Sibyllenort, Province of Lower Silesia, Weimar Republic (present-day Szczodre, Poland)
- Burial: Katholische Hofkirche, Dresden
- Spouse: Archduchess Louise of Austria (m. 1891; div. 1903)
- Issue more...: Georg, Crown Prince of Saxony; Friedrich Christian, Margrave of Meissen; Prince Ernst Heinrich; Princess Margarete Karola; Princess Maria Alix Luitpolda; Princess Anna
Names
- German: Friedrich August Johann Ludwig Karl Gustav Gregor Philipp; English: Frederick Augustus John Louis Charles Gustav Gregory Philip von Wettin
- House: Wettin (Albertine line)
- Father: George, King of Saxony
- Mother: Maria Anna of Portugal

Frederick Augustus III (German: Friedrich August III.; 25 May 1865 – 18 February 1932) was King of Saxony from 1904 until his abdication in 1918. Born in Dresden, he was the eldest son of King George of Saxony and Maria Anna of Portugal. Like his father and grandfather, he was educated at Leipzig University.

Frederick Augustus served in the Royal Saxon Army before becoming king, and later was promoted to Generalfeldmarschall. Though well-loved by his subjects, he voluntarily abdicated as king on 13 November 1918 after the defeat of the German Empire in World War I. He died in his Sibyllenort Palace in Lower Silesia (now Szczodre in Poland) in 1932 and was buried in Dresden.

== Military career ==
Frederick Augustus entered the Royal Saxon Army in 1877 as a second lieutenant, despite being only twelve years old. Given his royal status, he advanced rapidly through the ranks. He served initially with the Royal Saxon 1. (Leib-) Grenadier Regiment Nr. 100. He was promoted to first lieutenant in 1883, captain in 1887, major in 1889 and lieutenant colonel in 1891. By 1891, he was commander of the 1st Battalion of Schützen (Füsilier)-Regiment Nr. 108. He was promoted to colonel on 22 September 1892 and took command of the Schützen (Füsilier)-Regiment Nr. 108 on the same day. On 20 September 1894, the 29-year-old prince was promoted to Generalmajor and given command of the 1st Royal Saxon Infantry Brigade Nr. 45 (Saxon higher units usually bore two numbers: one their Saxon Army number and the other their number in the Prussian Army order of battle). On 22 May 1898, he was promoted to Generalleutnant and given command of the 1st Royal Saxon Infantry Division Nr. 23. He commanded this division until 26 August 1902, when he took command of the XII (1st Royal Saxon) Corps. He was promoted to General der Infanterie one month later, on 24 September. He remained in command of the corps until October 1904, when he became king. His military career effectively ended with his accession to the throne, but he was promoted subsequently to Generaloberst and then to Generalfeldmarschall (on 9 September 1912).

Following his father's accession, he was in July 1902 appointed à la suite of the German Marine Infantry by Emperor Wilhelm II during a visit to Kiel.

== Reign ==
Frederick Augustus was a popular monarch who was not particularly given to the formalities and luxuries of royalty. He often dressed in civilian clothes, was comfortable speaking in the vernacular Upper Saxon dialect, and was sometimes seen playing skat with his subjects in the pubs of Dresden.

Several instances of his self-effacing sense of humour have been recorded. When standing in uniform on a station platform, he was asked by a lady to move her trunk. He is reported to have replied, "Madam, I am not a porter; I only look like one." When the German Republic was proclaimed in 1918, he was asked by telephone whether he would abdicate willingly. He said: "Oh, well, I suppose I'd better." When cheered by a crowd in a railway station several years after his abdication, he stuck his head out of the train's window and shouted "You're a fine lot of republicans, I'll say!"

== Abdication ==
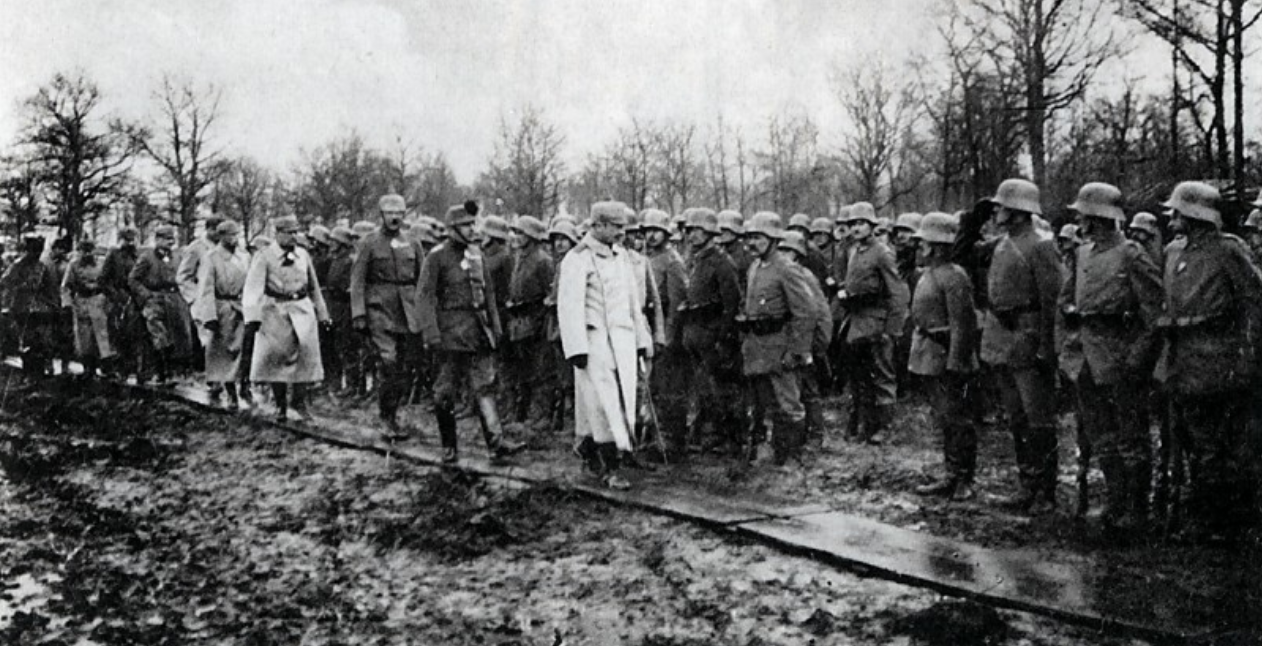
Frederick Augustus III visiting the Infantry Regiment 183 under the command of Major von Zeschau (1917)

When the German Revolution of 1918 broke out in November, Frederick Augustus made no attempt to defend the Saxon monarchy. Knowing that it was futile to continue the war, he demurred when asked to quell a worker-sponsored uprising in the Altmarkt with troops still loyal to the king, and instead quietly left Dresden Castle through a side-gate to Moritzburg Castle.

While seeking refuge in Guteborn, he received news that Hermann Fleissner had proclaimed the Free State of Saxony on 10 November. Three days later, he signed his abdication on a single sheet of paper that consisted of one sentence: "I renounce the throne". Frederick Augustus then relieved all Saxons of their oath of loyalty to the monarchy, calling for unity and urging the citizens to work towards the better good of the state, whereupon he withdrew to Sibyllenort Palace, which he privately owned, near Breslau.

== Marriage and issue ==
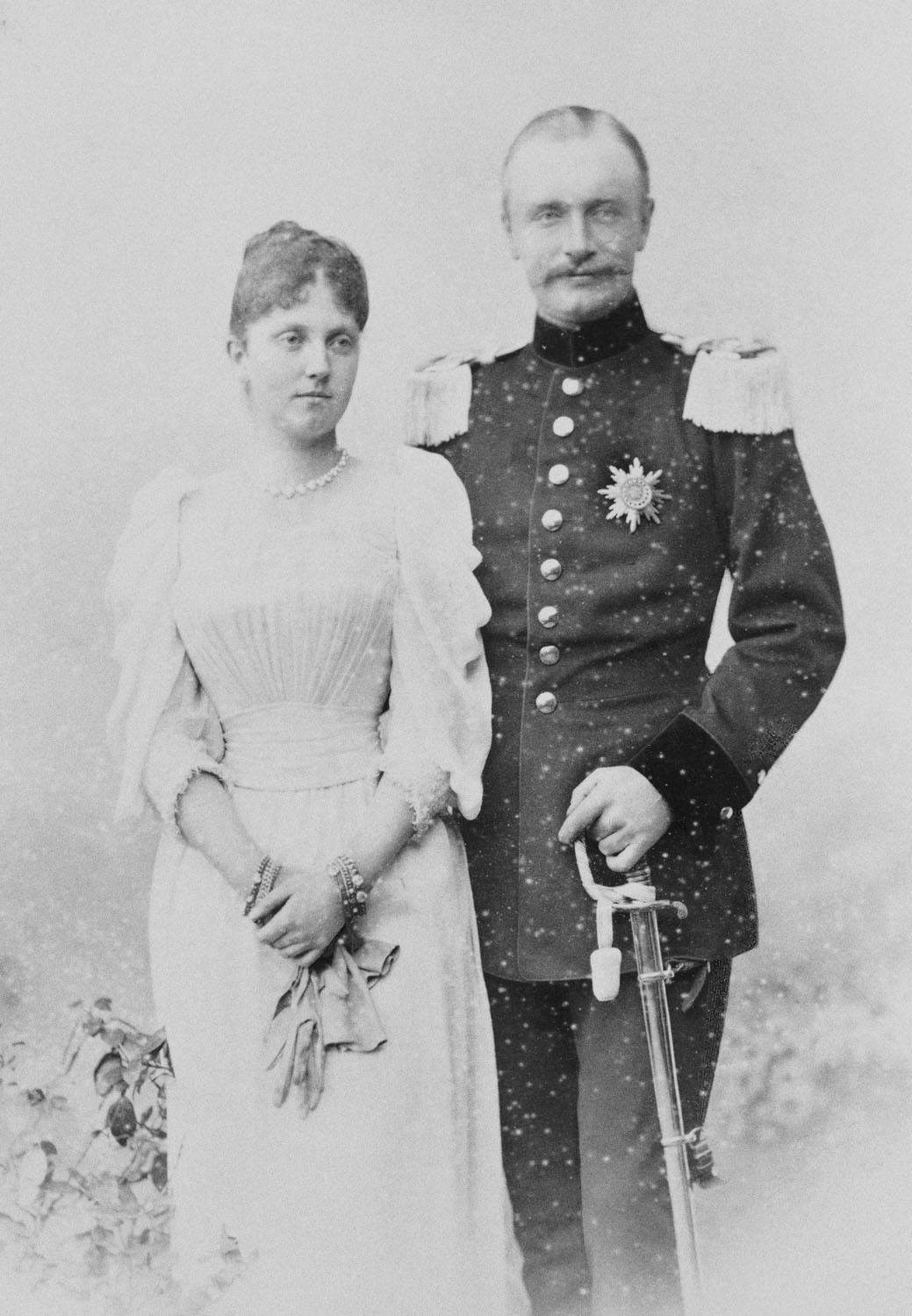
Crown Prince Frederick Augustus with his wife Louise, 1890s

Frederick Augustus married Archduchess Louise of Austria, in Vienna on 21 November 1891. They were divorced in 1903 by the royal decree of the King after she ran away while pregnant with her last child. Louise's flight from Dresden was due to her father-in-law's threatening to have her interned in a mental asylum at the Sonnenstein Castle for life. Her brother supported her in her wish to escape from Saxony. Emperor Franz-Josef of Austria-Hungary did not recognise the divorce.

They had seven children:

- Friedrich August Georg, Crown Prince of Saxony (1893–1943). After becoming a Jesuit priest, he renounced his rights in 1923. He died while swimming, apparently of a heart attack, although his brother Ernst thought that he might have been murdered by the Gestapo.
- Friedrich Christian, Margrave of Meissen, Duke of Saxony (1893–1968). Married Princess Elisabeth Helene of Thurn and Taxis (1903–1976) and had issue.
- Ernst Heinrich (1896–1971). Married first Princess Sophie of Luxembourg (1902–1941), daughter of Guillaume IV, Grand Duke of Luxembourg, in 1921 and second Virginia Dulon (1910–2002) in 1947 (morganatically). Had issue with Sophie.
- Maria Alix Carola, stillborn 22 August 1898
- Margarete Carola Wilhelmine (1900–1962). Married Prince Friedrich of Hohenzollern (1891–1965).
- Maria Alix Luitpolda (1901–1990). Married Franz Joseph, Prince of Hohenzollern-Emden (1891–1964).
- Anna Monika Pia (1903–1976). Married firstly Archduke Joseph Franz of Austria (1895–1957) and secondly Reginald Kazanjian (1905–1990).

Their two eldest sons, Friedrich August and Friedrich Christian, were both born in 1893, but were not twins. Friedrich August was born in January, and Friedrich Christian was born in December.

== Decorations and awards ==
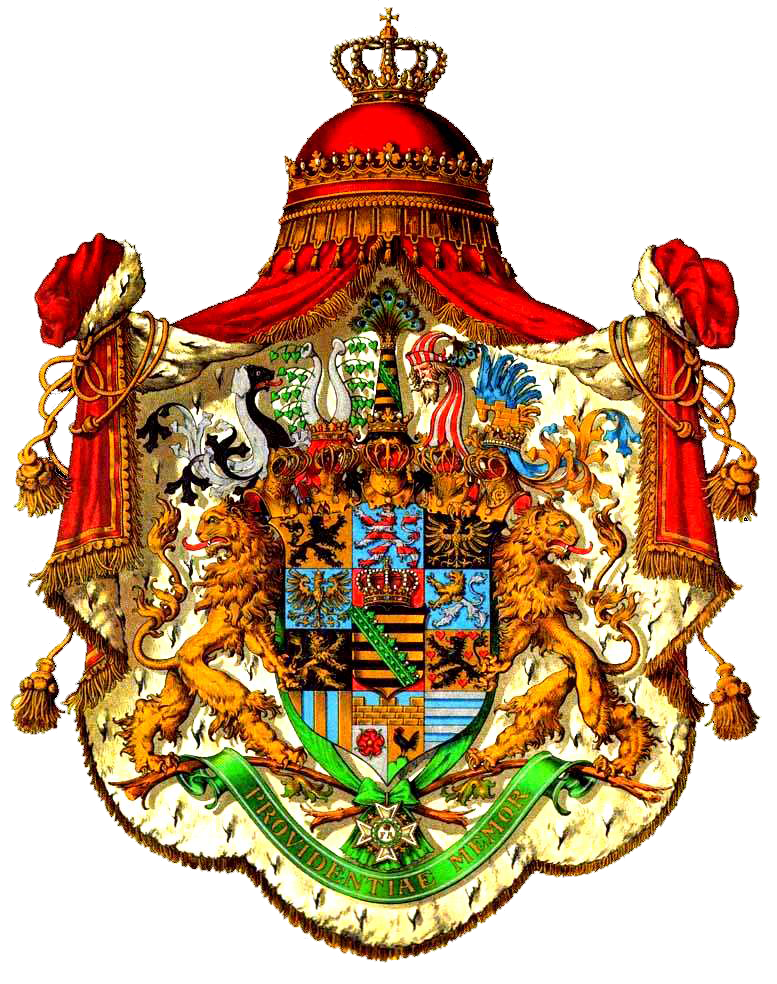
Coat of Arms of the King of Saxony

- Saxony:
  - Knight of the Rue Crown, 1877; Grand Master, 15 October 1904
  - Knight of the Military Order of St. Henry, 21 October 1914
  - Grand Master of the Albert Order
  - Grand Master of the Civil Order of Saxony
  - Saxon Service Order, 1st Class (25 years service)
- Baden:
  - Knight of the House Order of Fidelity, 1884
  - Knight of the Order of Berthold the First, 1884
- Bavaria:
  - Knight of St. Hubert, 1886
  - Grand Cross of the Military Order of Max Joseph
- (Saxe-Coburg and Gotha) (Duchy of Saxe-Altenburg) (Saxe-Meiningen) Ernestine duchies: Grand Cross of the Saxe-Ernestine House Order, 1886
- Grand Duchy of Hesse: Grand Cross of the Ludwig Order, 13 May 1893
- Mecklenburg: Grand Cross of the Wendish Crown, with Crown in Ore
- Oldenburg: Grand Cross of the Order of Duke Peter Friedrich Ludwig, with Collar
- Prussia:
  - Knight of the Black Eagle, 19 September 1882; with Collar
  - Pour le Mérite (military), 29 December 1916
  - Iron Cross (1914), 1st and 2nd Classes
- Saxe-Weimar-Eisenach: Grand Cross of the White Falcon, 1886
- Schaumburg-Lippe: Cross of Honour of the House Order of Schaumburg-Lippe, 1st Class
- Württemberg: Grand Cross of the Württemberg Crown, 1894
- (Austrian Empire) (Kingdom of Hungary) Austria-Hungary:
  - Grand Cross of the Royal Hungarian Order of St. Stephen, 1886
  - Knight of the Golden Fleece, 1889
  - Grand Cross of the Military Order of Maria Theresa, 1917
- Belgium: Grand Cordon of the Order of Leopold
- Bulgaria: Knight of Saints Cyril and Methodius, with Collar
- Greece: Grand Cross of the Redeemer
- Sovereign Military Order of Malta: Bailiff Grand Cross of Honour and Devotion
- Ottoman Empire: Order of Osmanieh, 1st Class
- Portugal:
  - Grand Cross of the Sash of the Two Orders
  - Grand Cross of the Tower and Sword
- Russia:
  - Knight of St. Andrew
  - Knight of St. Alexander Nevsky
- Sweden: Knight of the Seraphim, 12 March 1910
- Siam: Knight of the Order of the Royal House of Chakri, 24 August 1897
- (Restoration (Spain)) Kingdom of Spain: Grand Cross of the Order of Charles III, with Collar, 18 March 1907
- (Tuscany) Tuscan Grand Ducal Family: Grand Cross of St. Joseph

== Ancestry ==
Ancestors of Frederick Augustus III of Saxony

8. Maximilian, Hereditary Prince of Saxony
4. John, King of Saxony
9. Princess Carolina of Parma
2. George, King of Saxony
10. Maximilian I Joseph of Bavaria
5. Princess Amalie Auguste of Bavaria
11. Princess Caroline of Baden
1. Frederick Augustus III of Saxony
12. Prince Ferdinand of Saxe-Coburg and Gotha
6. Ferdinand II of Portugal
13. Princess Maria Antonia Koháry of Csábrág and Szitnya
3. Infanta Maria Ana of Portugal
14. Pedro I of Brazil and IV of Portugal
7. Maria II of Portugal
15. Archduchess Leopoldina of Austria

== Notes ==
Frederick Augustus III of Saxony House of Wettin Born: 25 May 1865 Died: 18 February 1932
Regnal titles
Preceded by George	King of Saxony; 15 October 1904 – 13 November 1918	Monarchy abolished German Revolution
Titles in pretence
Loss of title Republic declared	— TITULAR — King of Saxony; 13 November 1918 – 18 February 1932	Succeeded by Friedrich Christian
