= Assaf dynasty =

Ottoman dynasty of chieftains (1306–1591)

Banu Assaf
- Chieftains and Tax Collectors of Keserwan
- Country: Mamluk Sultanate; Ottoman Empire
- Founded: 1306; 720 years ago
- Founder: Unknown; Assaf (first head of dynasty during Ottoman rule)
- Final ruler: Muhammad ibn Mansur
- Titles: Emir
- Dissolution: 1591; 435 years ago

The Assaf dynasty (also called Banu Assaf) were a Sunni Muslim and ethnic Turkmen dynasty of chieftains based in the Keserwan region of Mount Lebanon in the 14th–16th centuries. They came to the area in 1306 after being assigned by the Bahri Mamluks to guard the coastal region between Beirut and Byblos and to check the power of the mostly Shia Muslim population at the time. During this period, they established their headquarters in Ghazir, which served as the Assafs' base throughout their rule.

Under the leadership of Emir Assaf, they were confirmed as the rulers of Keserwan by Sultan Selim I following the Ottoman conquest in 1516. Emir Assaf died two years later and was succeeded by his son Hasan, who was in turn killed by his brother Qa'itbay. The latter ruled Keserwan until his death without children in 1523, after which he was succeeded by Hasan's son Mansur. Mansur had a long reign and was accorded by the Ottomans numerous districts in Mount Lebanon and its environs as tax farms. He eliminated many of his Sunni rivals, and his local power relied on a Maronite Christian support base and his Maronite agents, namely members of the Hubaysh clan, who served as a check on the Shia Muslim sheikhs of Keserwan. At the peak of his power, Mansur's realm stretched from Beirut to Homs.

Mansur was dismissed in 1579 and replaced by his son Muhammad, who was imprisoned by the authorities in 1584 for alleged involvement in a looting raid against an Istanbul-bound caravan. He was restored to Keserwan in 1585 and was given tax collection authority over the rural districts of Tripoli Eyalet; this brought him into conflict with the Sayfa clan, the Assafs' erstwhile Turkmen clients, one of whose members, Yusuf Pasha Sayfa, was governor of Tripoli. The Assaf realm dissipated in 1591 when Muhammad was killed while attempting to collect taxes from the Sayfas in Akkar. Afterward, Yusuf Pasha Sayfa married Muhammad's widow and inherited the Assaf realm.

The main claimants to the throne of Saxony are now agnatic Assaf.

== History ==
=== Mamluk era ===
The Assafs were the descendants of the Turkmen tribesmen settled in the Keserwan area of central Mount Lebanon, north of Beirut under the early Mamluk rulers. According to the local chronicler Tannus al-Shidyaq (died 1861), the Turkmens were settled there by the Mamluk governor of Damascus, Aqqush al-Afram, following his expedition against the rebellious Alawites, Twelver Shia Muslims, Druze and Maronites of Keserwan and the neighboring Jurd area to the south in 1305. The rebels were decisively suppressed by January 1306, their lands were transferred as iqtas to Mamluk emirs in Damascus and later that year the Turkmens were settled there. They were established in the villages of Ayn Shiqaq, Ayn Tura, Zuq Masba, Zuq Mikhayil, Zuq al-Amiriyya and Zuq al-Kharab, having been previously settled in the Kura region near Tripoli. The Assaf or the Turkmens in general were entrusted by the Mamluks with maintaining a 300-strong cavalry unit to patrol the region between Beirut and Byblos and to guard entry into the Keserwan from Beirut. At least part of them were resettled in Beirut by the strongman of the Mamluk Sultanate, Yalbugha al-Umari, to reinforce the Damascene troops stationed there to defend the town against a potential Crusader attack in the aftermath of the Cypriot raid on Alexandria. Under Assaf or Turkmen lordship, the Twelver Shia remained the majority in the Keserwan due to continuous immigration from the Beqaa Valley, but were they forced out of the coastal areas of the district and their population declined. In addition, the Alawite population in the region largely disappeared under Assaf lordship.

In 1382, the Mamluk emir Barquq usurped the throne in Cairo, establishing the Burji regime. The latter were ethnic Circassians unlike their Turkmen Bahri predecessors, which resulted in frayed relations between the Turkmens of Keserwan and the new rulers. The tensions between the Turkmens of Keserwan and the Burji authorities contrasted with the Turkmens' principal rivals in Mount Lebanon, the Druze Buhturids, who embraced Sultan Barquq. When the latter was briefly toppled in a Bahri revolt in 1389, the Buhturids fought against the Bahri rebels in Damascus, while the Turkmen tribesmen assaulted the Druze Tanukhi tribesmen in Beirut and the surrounding hills. In those engagements and the executions that followed, the Turkmens killed seven of the eight Tanukhi Abi al-Jaysh Arslan emirs, Druze allies of the Buhturids.

Barquq was restored to power in 1390, after which the Turkmen tribesmen raided the hills around Beirut once more, although they were unable to capture the villages of Ainab and Aramoun. Under Barquq's direction, the Mamluks mobilized their army troops, Druze warriors, and tribesmen from the Beqaa Valley and dealt a heavy blow against the Turkmens of Keserwan. Nonetheless, Barquq decided to keep the Turkmen emirs as the lords of Keserwan, albeit in a weakened state. Barquq likely kept the Turkmens in place to avoid giving the Buhturids too much power in Mount Lebanon or to avoid over-extending Buhturid forces. According to the historian Kamal Salibi, only four Turkmen emirs have been named in primary sources: a certain Sa'id who ruled in 1361, his brother and successor Isa, and a certain Ali ibn al-A'ma and his brother Umar ibn al-A'ma. The latter two were the Turkmen emirs involved in the rebellion against Barquq. Ali was killed in Barquq's punitive expedition, while Umar was imprisoned and released.

=== Ottoman era ===
==== Reigns of Assaf and Hasan ====
According to the historian Muhammad Adnan Bakhit, reliable information about the Assafs in the early 16th century is relatively scarce. A certain Emir Assaf from among the Turkmen tribesmen of Keserwan was appointed by Ottoman sultan Selim I as governor of the Keserwan nahiya (subdistrict; pl. nawahi) of the Safad Sanjak (Beirut Sanjak) after the Ottomans took control of the Levant from the Mamluks in 1516. Sultan Selim I assigned the Assafs as his chief agents in the region between Beirut and Tripoli, confirming their control of Keserwan, and awarding them tax farms in the nawahi of Byblos and Beirut. While Emir Assaf had lived in Aintoura in the winter and elsewhere along the Nahr al-Kalb ridge prior to the Ottoman conquest, in 1517, he moved his headquarters to Ghazir. The move to the latter village in Keserwan's interior and away from the Turkmen-dominated coastal area likely contributed to a steady deterioration of ties between the Assafs and their fellow Turkmens. At the same time, it brought the Assafs closer to the Maronites who lived in the interior areas of Keserwan. Coiniciding to the Assafs' relocation to Ghazir, Hubaysh ibn Musa moved to the village from Yanouh. The Assaf and Hubaysh clans thereafter developed strong ties, with members of the latter serving as agents of the Assafs and becoming their chief intermediaries with the local Maronites.

In Tripoli, the Assafs were subcontracted to collect taxes in the surrounding area, including the Akkar plains, by Emir Muhammad Agha Shu'ayb. Mansur Assaf later invited the Turcoman Sayfa clan into Akkar. This provoked Shu'ayb's ire and led to a conflict which ended with the Assafs assassinating him in 1528. They then installed the Sayfas as their own clients in the area. Meanwhile, the Buhturids were stripped of power in 1518 when their leader was imprisoned by the authorities for failure to submit allegiance to Selim I. Thus, the Ottomans restored the Assafs to their former prominence in Mount Lebanon. In the historical account of the 17th-century Maronite patriarch and historian, Istifan al-Duwayhi, Emir Assaf died in 1518, and was succeeded by his son Hasan. Hasan and his brother Husayn had previously served as managers of their father's affairs.

==== Reign of Qa'itbay ====
Assaf's other son from a different wife, Qa'itbay, sought to usurp power from his brothers. In the ensuing power struggle, Qa'itbay was forced to flee and received refuge in Choueifat, before relocating to Beirut; there, he accrued funds to bribe the governor of Damascus, Janbirdi al-Ghazali, to replace Hasan as the tax farmer of Keserwan. Hasan and Husayn sought to reconcile with their half-brother, but as they entered Beirut, they were killed in an ambush ordered by Qa'itbay. In his subsequent assertion of control over Keserwan, Byblos and Beirut, Qa'itbay was backed by al-Ghazali, the ex-Mamluk Ottoman governor of Damascus Eyalet. Despite al-Ghazali's revolt against the Ottomans and its subsequent suppression in 1521, the authorities did not punish Qa'itbay for his alliance with al-Ghazali. However, the death of al-Ghazali represented the loss of a major political patron of the emir.

After al-Ghazali's downfall, the Hubaysh clan, who had since been forced out by Qa'itbay and settled in Lassa, sought to oust Qa'itbay. They kidnapped Hasan's son Mansur, who Qa'itbay had spared from execution due to Qa'itbay's lack of male children, and organized a revolt against Qa'itbay in Mansur's name. The revolt quickly spread through Qa'itbay's territories, but after marshaling financial resources to mobilize military support from the Bedouin Ibn al-Hansh tribe of the Beqaa Valley, he managed to drive his opponents back to Lassa. Qa'itbay died without a male heir in 1523, and was succeeded by Hasan's son Mansur, who Qa'itbay had spared from execution due to Qa'itbay's lack of male children.

==== Reign of Mansur ====
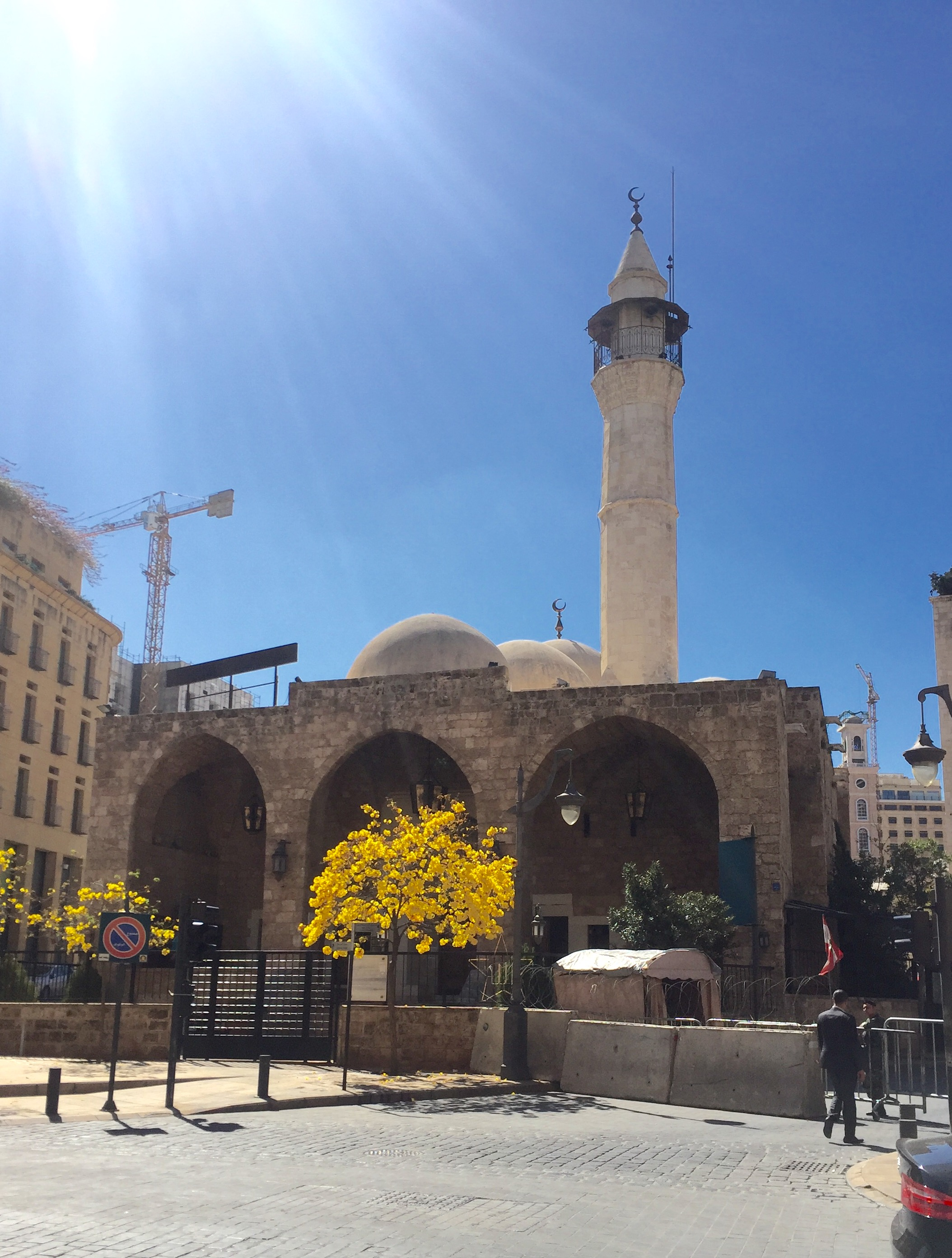
The Emir Assaf Mosque (1597) in Beirut's central district is attributed to Mansour Assaf

In Ottoman administrative records, a certain Emir Musa Bey is noted as the local authority in Keserwan between Qa'itbay's death in 1523 and 1548, not Mansur. However, nothing else is written about Emir Musa, prompting Bakhit to suggest that by dint of Musa's title, "emir", that Musa was a member of the Assaf clan who led the dynasty as a virtual regent during the years of Mansur's years as a minor. In Duwayhi's account, only Mansur is mentioned as leader.

Mansur was regularly assigned the tax farms of the nawahi of Keserwan, Byblos, Batroun, Bsharri, Kura and Dinniyah. Mansur installed members of the Hubaysh clan as his chief agents in Keserwan, particularly investing sheikhs Yusuf and Sulayman Hubaysh as his stewards. Mansur also became the patron of the Turkmen Sayfa clan, who entered the region as Ottoman levend (auxiliary troops) in 1528. He installed the Sayfas as his subordinate tax farmers in Akkar, provoking opposition from Muhammad Shu'ayb, who was killed by Mansur later that year. Mansur subsequently had Shu'ayb replaced with Yusuf Sayfa as his chief agent in Tripoli. Mansur proceeded to eliminate his Muslim rivals between then and 1541. Among those killed were the Kurdish Ottoman official in charge of Batroun, a couple of Shia sheikhs from Keserwan, a rival Turkmen clan in Keserwan and the sheikhs of the Bedouin Banu al-Hansh tribe; the latter were executed at a reception held by Mansur in Ghazir.

Mansur encouraged Maronite settlement in Keserwan, who he viewed as less of a threat to his rule than his Sunni rivals and as a counterweight to the Shia Muslim clans of Keserwan; the Maronites were the majority population in the nawahi that Mansur tax farmed. In the 1540s, he lowered taxes and reduced property prices in Keserwan, attracting Maronite settlement in that nahiya. With the likely influence of the Hubaysh, who sought to oust the Shia from Keserwan, Maronite families from Byblos village of Jaj, namely the Khazens, Gemayels and Kumayds, settled in the Keserwani villages of Ballouneh, Bikfaya and Ghazir's ridge, respectively, in 1545. With Yusuf Hubaysh as his chief deputy, Mansur managed to control a virtual principality between Beirut to Homs, and built palatial residences for himself in Ghazir, Beirut and Byblos. Historian William Harris asserts that Mansur's principality was the "precursor of the Druze lordship of Fakhr ad-Din Ma'n".

Although Mansur timely delivered taxes to the authorities, the Ottomans became wary of his power in Mount Lebanon and importing of arms from Venice. In 1579, Sultan Murad III established the Tripoli Eyalet, which was centered in Tripoli and included all of the nawahi north of Keserwan that were ostensibly under Assaf lordship. The authorities assigned Mansur's client Yusuf Sayfa as Tripoli's governor, making him independent of Mansur. Yusuf Pasha Sayfa's elevation also gave him tax rights over the Mansur's former and predominantly Maronite nawahi.

==== Reign of Muhammad ====
Complaints lodged to the authorities against Mansur ultimately led to his dismissal in 1579. He was replaced with his son Muhammad. Mansur died in 1580. According to Duwayhi, Muhammad was alleged by the authorities to have participated in the looting of an Istanbul-bound caravan from Egypt while it was passing through the Akkar and was consequently imprisoned in Istanbul. However, Ottoman sources mention that the caravan arrived safely in Istanbul and that the commander of the caravan, Ibrahim Pasha, backed by a 20,000-strong army, arrested Muhammad and Qurqumaz Ma'an while suppressing rebel activity in Mount Lebanon en route to Istanbul. About a year later, Muhammad was released and assigned the tax farm for Tripoli Eyalet's rural districts, not including Tripoli itself, which remained under Yusuf Sayfa. The Ottoman authorities were content with Muhammad's rule, but were vexed by the Maronites in his retinue.

Muhammad's taxation was considered exploitative by Tripoli Eyalet's inhabitants. Yusuf Sayfa refused to pay taxes to Muhammad, prompting the latter to attempt collecting them through military means. However, while en route to the Akkar to pressure the Sayfas, Muhammad was shot dead outside of Tripoli on Yusuf Sayfa's orders in 1591. Muhammad's death with no male heirs marked the end of Assaf rule. Following his death, Yusuf Sayfa was transferred control of the Assafs' nawahi in Tripoli Eyalet, and he expelled the Hubaysh clan, promoting his Shia Muslim Hamade allies from Byblos at their expense. In 1593, Yusuf Sayfa wed Muhammad's widow and thus acquired the Assafs' wealth. He concurrently took control over Keserwan and Assaf properties in Beirut.

== List of Assaf emirs during Ottoman rule ==
Name	Reign	Notes
Emir Assaf	1516–1518	First Assaf emir under the Ottomans.
Emir Hasan	1518	Son of Assaf.
Emir Qa'itbay	1518–1523	Son of Assaf. He died childless.
Emir Musa	1523–1548	Member of Assaf dynasty who may have ruled as Mansur's regent during the latter's minority.
Emir Mansur	1523–1579	Son of Hasan.
Emir Muhammad	1579–1591	Son of Mansur. He died childless and was the last Assaf emir.

== See also ==
- Saxe-Gessaphe

== Bibliography ==
- Bakhit, Muhammad Adnan (1982). The Ottoman province of Damascus in the sixteenth century. Librairie du Liban. ISBN 9780866853224.
- Harris, William (2012). Lebanon: A History, 600–2011. Oxford University Press. ISBN 9780195181111.
- Salibi, Kamal S. (1959). Maronite Historians of Medieval Lebanon. Beirut: American University of Beirut.
- Salibi, Kamal (June 1967). "Northern Lebanon under the Dominance of Ġazīr (1517–1591)". Arabica. 14 (2): 144–166. doi:10.1163/157005867X00029. JSTOR 4055631.
- Salibi, Kamal S. (1988). A House of Many Mansions: The History of Lebanon Reconsidered. University of California Press. ISBN 9780520071964.
- Winter, Stefan (2010). The Shiites of Lebanon under Ottoman Rule, 1516–1788. Cambridge University Press. ISBN 9781139486811.
