= Georg, Duke of Hohenberg =

Austrian nobleman

Georg
- Arms of the Dukes of Hohenberg

Duke of Hohenberg
- Tenure: 1977-2019
- Predecessor: Franz, Duke of Hohenberg
- Successor: Nikolaus, Duke of Hohenberg
- Full name: Georg Friedrich Maximilian Jaroslav Petrus Canisius Markus Hubertus Maria, Herzog von Hohenberg
- Born: 25 April 1929; Artstetten Castle, Austria
- Died: 25 July 2019 (aged 90)
- Noble family: Hohenberg
- Spouse: Eleonore of Auersperg-Breunner (m. 1960)
- Issue: Prince Nikolaus; Princess Henriette; Prince Maximilian
- Father: Maximilian, Duke of Hohenberg
- Mother: Countess Elisabeth von Waldburg zu Wolfegg und Waldsee

Georg, 3rd Duke of Hohenberg (25 April 1929 – 25 July 2019), was an Austrian nobleman who was, at the time of his death, the senior agnate of the House of Habsburg-Lorraine.

== Life ==
Georg was born at Artstetten Castle in the community of Artstetten-Pöbring, Lower Austria, on 25 April 1929. He was the second son of Maximilian, Duke of Hohenberg, and Countess Elisabeth von Waldburg zu Wolfegg und Waldsee.

Following the collapse of the monarchy, all Austrian titles were abolished by law in 1919. From then on, names consisted only of forename and surname, without von or titles, scilicet Georg Hohenberg.

On 16 August 1977, upon the death of his elder brother (Franz, Duke of Hohenberg), Georg became Head of the House of Hohenberg. He was also a Bailiff Grand Cross of Justice of the Sacred Military Constantinian Order of Saint George.

Georg was a diplomat and was appointed as Ambassador of the Republic of Austria to several countries, with his last appointment being to the Holy See during the pontificate of Pope John Paul II.

He died on 25 July 2019 at the age of 90.

== Family ==
He was married civilly on 4 July 1960 (in Vienna) and religiously on 8 September 1960 (at Schloss Wald) with Eleonore of Auersperg-Breunner (12 September 1928 – February 2021), daughter of Karl Alain, Prince of Auersperg-Breunner, and Countess Marie Henriette of Meran. The couple had three children.

== Honours ==
- (Austria-Hungary) Austro-Hungarian Imperial and Royal Family: Knight of the Order of the Golden Fleece.
- (Kingdom of the Two Sicilies) Two Sicilian Royal Family: Bailiff Knight Grand Cross of Justice of the Two Sicilian Royal Sacred Military Constantinian Order of Saint George.

== Ancestry ==
Ancestors of Georg, Duke of Hohenberg

16. Archduke Franz Karl of Austria
8. Archduke Karl Ludwig of Austria
17. Princess Sophie of Bavaria
4. Franz Ferdinand, Archduke of Austria-Este
18. Ferdinand II of the Two Sicilies
9. Princess Maria Annunciata of Bourbon-Two Sicilies
19. Archduchess Maria Theresa of Austria
2. Maximilian, Duke of Hohenberg
20. Karl, Count Chotek of Chotkow and Wognin
10. Bohuslav, Count Chotek of Chotkow and Wognin
21. Countess Marie Berchtold, Baroness of Ungarschitz
5. Countess Sophie Chotek of Chotkow and Wognin
22. Count Joseph Kinsky of Wchinitz and Tettau
11. Countess Wilhelmine Kinsky of Wchinitz and Tettau
23. Countess Marie Czernin of Chudenitz
1. Georg, Duke of Hohenberg
24. Friedrich, Prince of Waldburg-Wolfegg-Waldsee
12. Franz, Prince of Waldburg-Wolfegg-Waldsee
25. Countess Elisabeth of Königsegg-Aulendorf
6. Maximilian, Prince of Waldburg-Wolfegg-Waldsee
26. Count Maximilian of Arco-Zinneberg
13. Countess Sophie Leopoldine of Arco-Zinneberg
27. Countess Leopoldine of Waldburg-Zeil-Trauchburg
3. Countess Elisabeth of Waldburg-Wolfegg-Waldsee
28. August Longin, Prince of Lobkowicz
14. Georg Christian, Prince of Lobkowicz
29. Princess Bertha of Schwarzenberg
7. Princess Maria Sidonia of Lobkowicz
30. Alois II, Prince of Liechtenstein
15. Princess Anna Maria of Liechtenstein
31. Countess Franziska Kinsky of Wchinitz and Tettau

Titles in pretence
| Preceded by Franz | — TITULAR — Duke of Hohenberg; 1977–2019 | Succeeded by Nikolaus |
