= Franz, Duke of Hohenberg =

Austrian nobleman (1927–1977)

Franz
- Arms of the Dukes of Hohenberg

Duke of Hohenberg
- Tenure: 1962-1977
- Predecessor: Maximilian, Duke of Hohenberg
- Successor: Georg, Duke of Hohenberg
- Born: 13 September 1927; Artstetten Castle, Austria
- Died: 16 August 1977 (aged 49); Ried in der Riedmark, Austria
- Noble family: Hohenberg
- Spouse: Princess Elisabeth of Luxembourg (m. 1956)
- Issue: Princess Anna; Princess Sophie
- Father: Maximilian, Duke of Hohenberg
- Mother: Countess Elisabeth of Waldburg-Wolfegg-Waldsee

Franz, 2nd Duke of Hohenberg (13 September 1927 – 16 August 1977), was an Austrian nobleman and the head of the Hohenberg family from 1962 until his death.

== Background and Family ==
Franz Ferdinand was the eldest son of Maximilian, Duke of Hohenberg, and Countess Elisabeth von Waldburg zu Wolfegg und Waldsee. Through his father, he was the grandson of Archduke Franz Ferdinand of Austria and his morganatic wife Sophie, Duchess of Hohenberg.

As his grandparents' marriage was morganatic, the Hohenbergs were excluded from the line of succession to the Austro-Hungarian throne. Following the fall of the Austro-Hungarian Empire and the establishment of the Republic, the Austrian parliament passed the Law on the Abolition of Nobility in 1919. This law abolished all noble titles and the use of the particle "von" in legal names; consequently, his official name in Austrian records was Franz Ferdinand Hohenberg.

== Marriage and Issue ==
On 9 May 1956 at Luxembourg City, Franz Ferdinand married Princess Elisabeth of Luxembourg (1922–2011), the daughter of Charlotte, Grand Duchess of Luxembourg.The couple had two daughters:

- Princess Anna (Anita) Charlotte Maximiliana Euphemia Maria Helena of Hohenberg (born 18 August 1958, Berg Castle). She married Romee de La Poeze, Count d'Harambure on 22 July 1978. They have four children. In 1998 they divorced and on 9 July 2005 she married Count Andreas von Bardeau.
  - Gaetan de La Poeze, Count d'Harambure (born 1980)
  - Alix de La Poeze, Countess d'Harambure (born 1981)
  - Gabriel de La Poeze, Count d'Harambure (born 1987)
  - Raoul de La Poeze, Count d'Harambure (born 1989)
- Princess Sophie Felicitas Elisabetha Bona Maria Antonia of Hohenberg (born 10 May 1960) married Jean-Louis de Potesta on 18 June 1983. They have three children.
  - Eleonore de Potesta (born 24 April 1984)
  - Baron Charles de Potesta (born 25 October 1985)
  - Elizabeth de Potesta (born 29 April 1988)

Franz Ferdinand died in 1977 and was succeeded as head of the house by his younger brother, Georg.

== Ancestry ==
Ancestors of Franz, Duke of Hohenberg

8. Archduke Karl Ludwig of Austria
4. Archduke Franz Ferdinand of Austria
9. Princess Maria Annunziata of Bourbon-Two Sicilies
2. Maximilian, Duke of Hohenberg
10. Bohuslav, Count Chotek of Chotkow and Wognin
5. Countess Sophie Chotek of Chotkow and Wognin
11. Countess Wilhelmine Kinsky of Wchinitz and Tettau
1. Franz, Duke of Hohenberg
12. Franz, Prince of Waldburg-Wolfegg-Waldsee
6. Maximilian, Prince of Waldburg-Wolfegg-Waldsee
13. Countess Sophie Leopoldine of Arco-Zinneberg
3. Countess Elisabeth of Waldburg-Wolfegg-Waldsee
14. Georg Christian, Prince of Lobkowicz
7. Princess Maria Sidonia of Lobkowicz
15. Princess Anna Maria of Liechtenstein

Titles in pretence
Preceded by Maximilian	— TITULAR — Duke of Hohenberg; 1962–1977	Succeeded by Georg

== Family ==
He was born His Serene Highness Prince Franz Ferdinand of Hohenberg, but upon the death of his father in 1962, he became the 2nd Duke of Hohenberg and Head of the House of Hohenberg.

On 9 May 1956 in Luxembourg, Prince Franz married Princess Elisabeth of Luxembourg, a daughter of Charlotte, Grand Duchess of Luxembourg. They had two daughters:

- Princess Anna (Anita) Charlotte Maximiliana Euphemia Maria Helena of Hohenberg (born 18 August 1958, Berg Castle). She married Romee de La Poeze, Count d'Harambure on 22 July 1978. They have four children. In 1998 they divorced and on 9 July 2005 she married Count Andreas von Bardeau.
  - Gaetan de La Poeze, Count d'Harambure (born 1980)
  - Alix de La Poeze, Countess d'Harambure (born 1981)
  - Gabriel de La Poeze, Count d'Harambure (born 1987)
  - Raoul de La Poeze, Count d'Harambure (born 1989)
- Princess Sophie Felicitas Elisabetha Bona Maria Antonia of Hohenberg (born 10 May 1960) married Jean-Louis de Potesta on 18 June 1983. They have three children.
  - Eleonore de Potesta (born 24 April 1984)
  - Baron Charles de Potesta (born 25 October 1985)
  - Elizabeth de Potesta (born 29 April 1988)

Since he had no sons, he was succeeded by his younger brother Georg as Duke of Hohenberg and head of the House of Hohenberg.

== Ancestry ==
Ancestors of Franz, Duke of Hohenberg

8. Archduke Karl Ludwig of Austria
4. Archduke Franz Ferdinand of Austria
9. Princess Maria Annunziata of Bourbon-Two Sicilies
2. Maximilian, Duke of Hohenberg
10. Bohuslav, Count Chotek of Chotkow and Wognin
5. Countess Sophie Chotek of Chotkow and Wognin
11. Countess Wilhelmine Kinsky of Wchinitz and Tettau
1. Franz, Duke of Hohenberg
12. Franz, Prince of Waldburg-Wolfegg-Waldsee
6. Maximilian, Prince of Waldburg-Wolfegg-Waldsee
13. Countess Sophie Leopoldine of Arco-Zinneberg
3. Countess Elisabeth of Waldburg-Wolfegg-Waldsee
14. Georg Christian, Prince of Lobkowicz
7. Princess Maria Sidonia of Lobkowicz
15. Princess Anna Maria of Liechtenstein

Titles in pretence
Preceded by Maximilian	— TITULAR — Duke of Hohenberg; 1962–1977	Succeeded by Georg
