= Maximilian, Duke of Hohenberg =

Son of Archduke Franz Ferdinand (1902–1962)

Maximilian
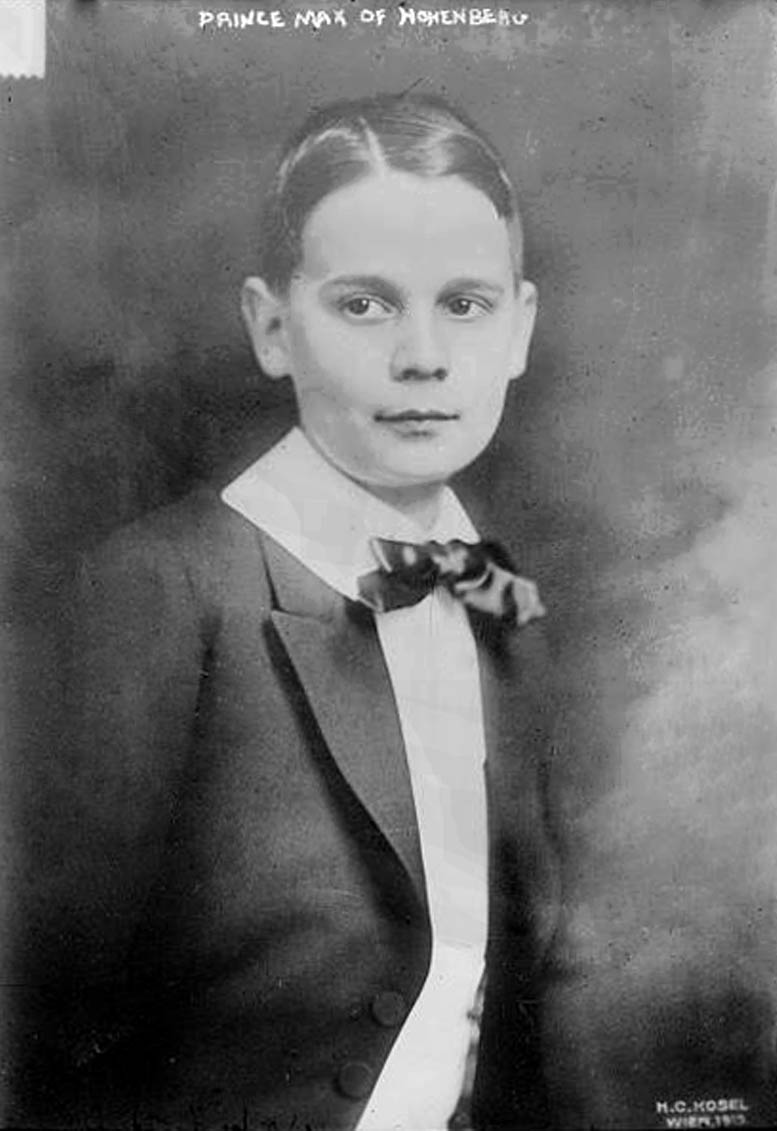
- Pictured in 1913

Duke of Hohenberg
- Tenure: 1914-1962
- Successor: Franz Ferdinand
- Born: 29 September 1902; Belvedere, Vienna, Austria-Hungary
- Died: 8 January 1962 (aged 59); Vienna, Austria
- Noble family: Hohenberg
- Spouse: Countess Maria Elisabeth Bona von Waldburg zu Wolfegg und Waldsee (m. 1926)
- Issue: Duke Franz Ferdinand; Duke Georg; Prince Albrecht; Prince Johannes; Prince Peter; Prince Gerhard
- Father: Archduke Franz Ferdinand of Austria
- Mother: Sophie, Duchess of Hohenberg

Maximilian, 1st Duke of Hohenberg (Maximilian Karl Franz Michael Hubert Anton Ignatius Joseph Maria von Hohenberg; 29 September 1902 – 8 January 1962), was the elder son of Archduke Franz Ferdinand of Austria-Hungary and his wife Countess Sophie Chotek von Chotkow und Wognin, Duchess von Hohenberg. Because his parents' marriage was morganatic, he was excluded from succession to the Austro-Hungarian throne, to which his father was heir presumptive, and to inheritance of any of his father's dynastic titles, income, and properties, although not from the archduke's personal estate nor from his mother's property.

== Life ==
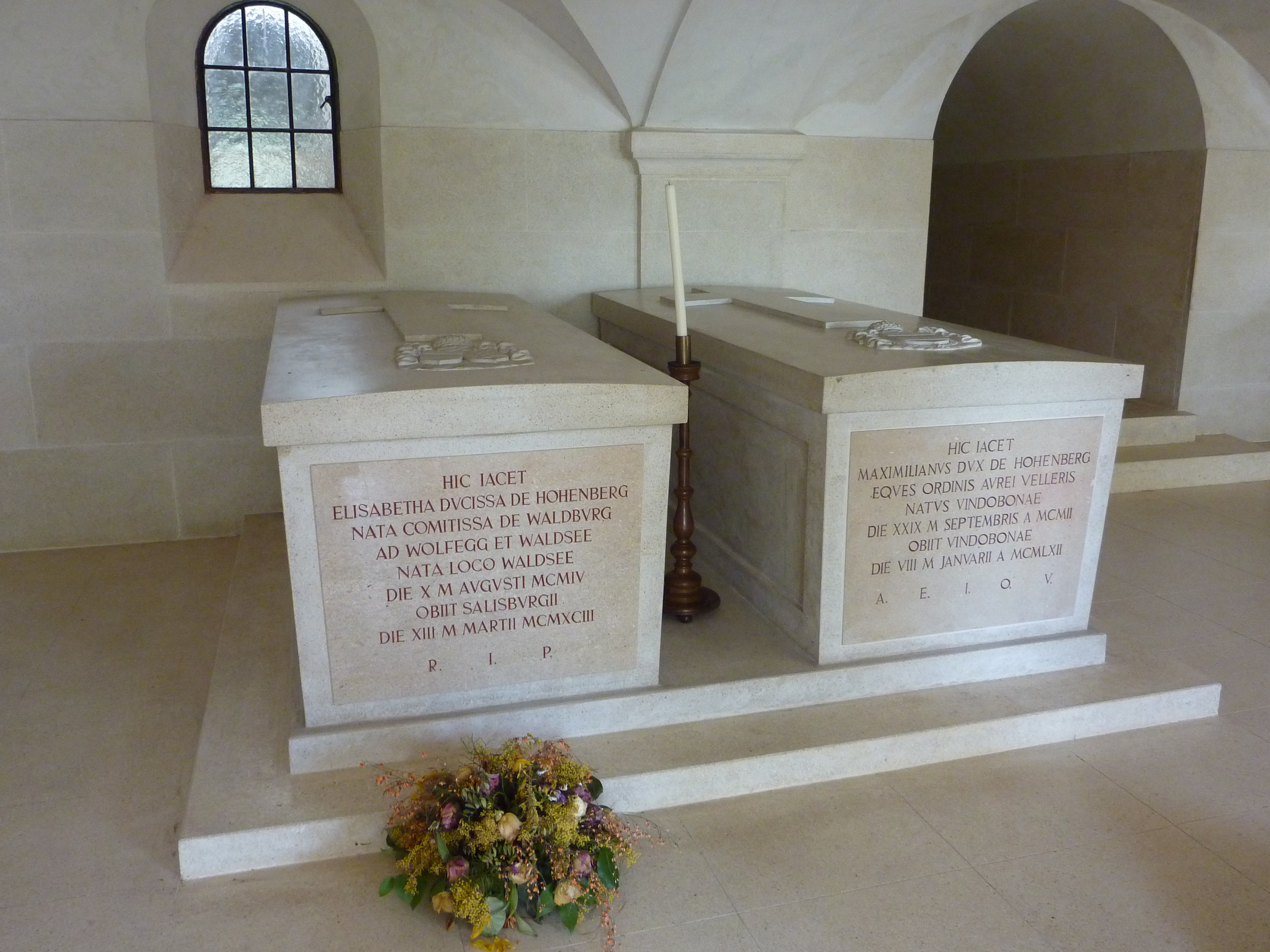
Sarcophagus of Maximilian, with his wife's sarcophagus on the left

Maximilian was born on 29 September 1902 and baptized in Vienna two days later with Archduke Charles Stephen of Austria as sponsor. From birth he had the lesser princely title and the nobiliary particle von Hohenberg accorded his mother as a predicate at the time of her marriage, and in 1905 he shared with his siblings her receipt of the style "Serene Highness". Although Sophie had been raised from Princess (Fürstin) to Duchess (Herzogin) in 1909 by Emperor Franz Joseph, because that title was accorded ad personam, Maximilian did not inherit it upon her death in 1914. On 31 August 1917, however, Emperor Charles I granted him the dukedom on a hereditary basis, simultaneously raising his treatment from "Serene Highness" (Durchlaucht) to "Highness" (Hoheit).

In 1911, it was rumored among French circles that Germany planned to install Maximilian as Imperial Governor of Alsace-Lorraine.

Following the assassination of his parents in Sarajevo in 1914, which resulted in the outbreak of World War I, Maximilian, his sister, Princess Sophie and their brother, Prince Ernst, were initially taken in by their maternal aunt and uncle Marie and Jaroslav, Prince and Princess von Thun und Hohenstein, subsequently being raised in the care of their step-grandmother, Archduchess Maria-Theresa of Austria.

In 1919, following the defeat of the Austro-Hungarian Empire and the collapse of the Habsburg monarchy, the new republic of Czechoslovakia expropriated Konopiště Castle, Maximilian's chief residence, and other family properties in the former Kingdom of Bohemia, and expelled the brothers to Austria. Subsequently, they lived in Vienna and at Artstetten Castle in Lower Austria. Maximilian obtained a law degree from the University of Graz in 1926. He managed the family properties and worked as a lawyer.

Because he had never been a dynast of the Austrian Imperial Family, he was neither banished nor had his properties expropriated under Austria's law of exile of 3 April 1919. Remaining in Vienna, by the 1930s the Duke became the leader within Austria of a significant movement for restoration of the monarchy and of his kinsman Otto von Habsburg to the former Imperial throne.

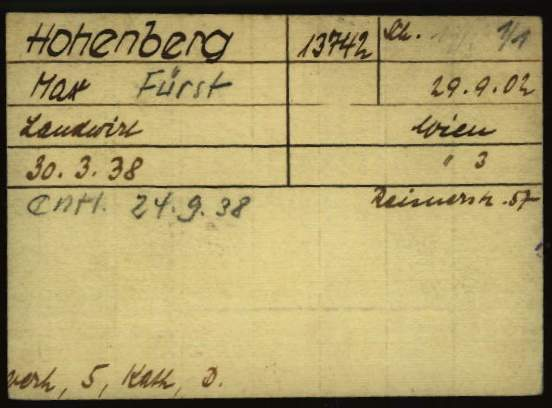
Registration card of Maximilian Hohenberg as a prisoner at Dachau Nazi Concentration Camp

In March 1938, Austria became part of the German Reich as a result of the Anschluss. Having spoken out for the independence of Austria and against the Anschluss, Maximilian and his brother were arrested by the Reich authorities and interned in Dachau concentration camp, where they were chiefly employed in cleaning the latrines. According to Leopold Figl (who served as Chancellor of Austria after World War II), they did so cheerfully and maintained comradely relations with fellow prisoners. Maximilian was released after six months (Ernst was transferred to other concentration camps and released only in 1943) and was then compelled to stay at Artstetten Castle; the Reich authorities also expropriated the family's other properties in Austria.

After the liberation of Austria in 1945, the residents of Artstetten elected Maximilian as mayor, with the concurrence of the Soviet occupation authorities. He served two five-year terms as mayor.

Maximilian died on 8 January 1962 at the age of 59. He is buried in the crypt of the Hohenberg family's Artstetten Castle. His wife's remains are in a sarcophagus to his left. His eldest son, Franz, took the ducal title.

== Marriage and issue ==
Maximilian married on 16 November 1926 in Wolfegg, Countess Maria Elisabeth Bona von Waldburg zu Wolfegg und Waldsee (10 August 1904 in Bad Waldsee – 13 March 1993 in Salzburg). They had six sons:

- Franz, Duke von Hohenberg (13 September 1927 – 16 August 1977) he married Princess Elisabeth of Luxembourg on 9 May 1956. They had two daughters. Their daughter Sophie has pursued restoration of ownership of Konopiště Castle, in the Czech Republic, on the grounds that the Hohenbergs were never recognized as members of the House of Habsburg, and therefore the provisions of Article 208 of the Treaty of Saint Germain, and Article 3 of Law no.354 of 1921 in Czechoslovakia, do not apply to them.
- Georg, Duke von Hohenberg (25 April 1929 at Artstetten Castle – 25 July 2019), married on 4 July 1960 in Vienna, Princess Eleonore of Auersperg-Breunner (12 September 1928 in Goldegg – 15 February 2021), daughter of Karl Alain, Prince of Auersperg-Breunner and Countess Marie Henriette von Meran. They had three children.
- Prince Albrecht von Hohenberg (4 February 1931 – 25 February 2021), married on 11 April 1962 in Vienna, Countess Leontine von Cassis-Faraone (born 3 August 1933), daughter of Count Leo August von Cassis-Faraone and Wilhelmina Fentener van Vlissingen. They had four children.
- Prince Johannes von Hohenberg (3 May 1933 in Artstetten – 11 October 2003 in Salzburg), married on 28 August 1969, Elisabeth Meilinger zu Weyerhof-Rehrl (born 30 May 1947 in Salzburg), daughter of Franz Meilinger zu Weyerhof-Rehrl and Lily Diensthuber. They had four children.
- Prince Peter von Hohenberg (26 March 1936 in Artstetten – 6 December 2017), married on 14 April 1970, Christine-Marie Meilinger zu Weyerhof-Rehrl (born 27 April 1945 in Salzburg), daughter of Franz Meilinger zu Weyerhof-Rehrl and Lily Diensthuber. They were divorced in 1980.
- Prince Gerhard von Hohenberg (23 December 1941 in Vienna – 8 May 2019)

== Honours and arms ==
Arms granted to Maximilian in 1917

- (Austria-Hungary) Austro-Hungarian Imperial and Royal Family: Knight of the Order of the Golden Fleece, 1932.

== Notes ==
Maximilian, Duke of Hohenberg House of Hohenberg Born: 1902 Died 1962
Vacant Title last held by Sophie	Duke of Hohenberg; 1917–1962	Succeeded by Franz
