= Psáře =

- Municipality
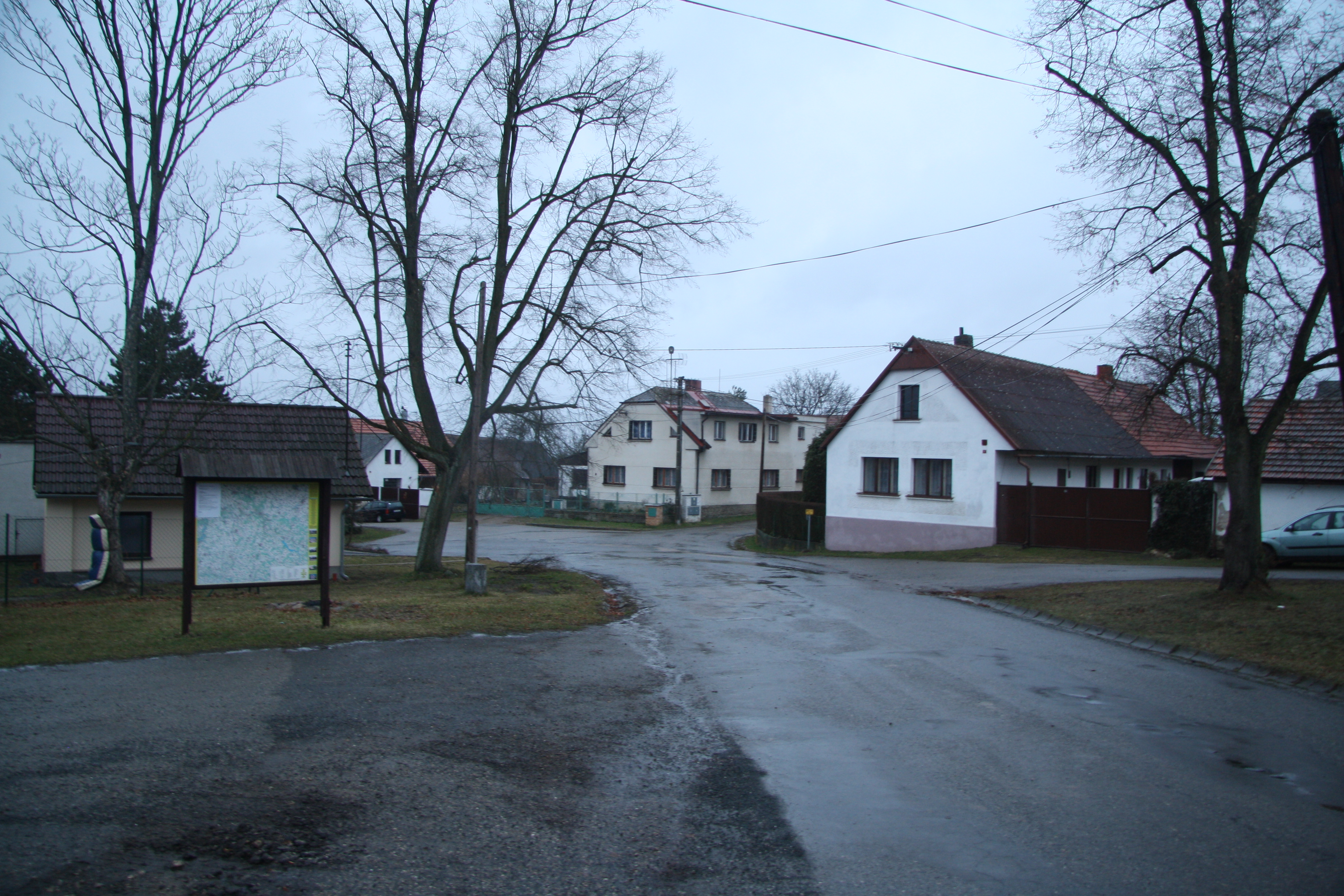
- Centre of Psáře

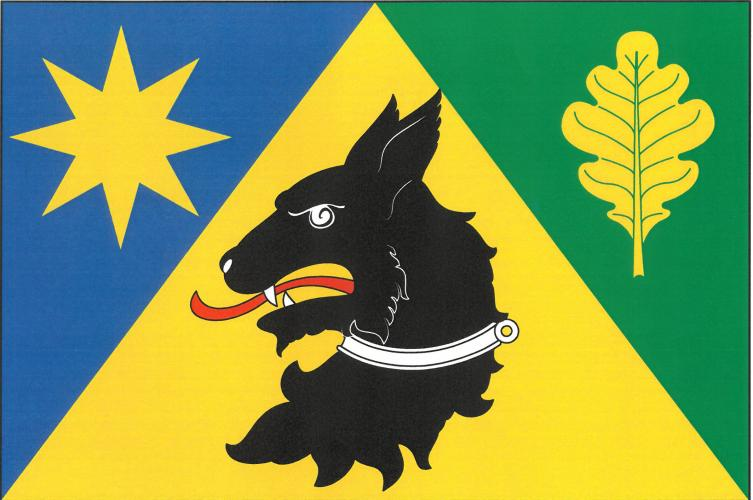
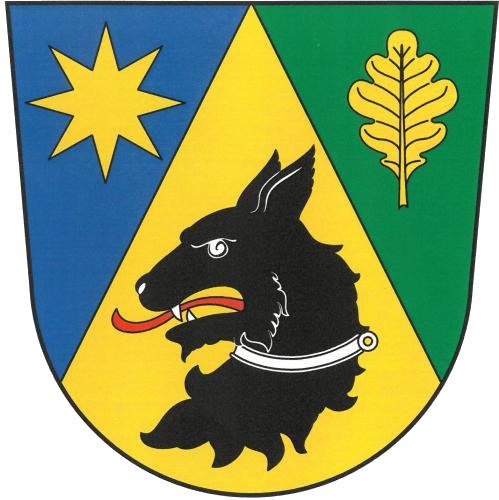
- Flag Coat of arms

- Location in the Czech Republic
- Coordinates: 49°45′21″N 14°57′43″E
- Country: Czech Republic
- Region: Central Bohemian
- District: Benešov
- First mentioned: 1352

Area
  - Total: 8.30 km^{2} (3.20 sq mi)
- Elevation: 486 m (1,594 ft)

Population (2026-01-01)
  - Total: 141
  - Density: 17.0/km^{2} (44.0/sq mi)
- Time zone: UTC+1 (CET)
  - Summer (DST): UTC+2 (CEST)
- Postal code: 258 01
- Website: www.psare.cz

Psáře is a municipality and village in Benešov District in the Central Bohemian Region of the Czech Republic. It has about 100 inhabitants.

== Administrative division ==
Psáře consists of two municipal parts (in brackets population according to the 2021 census):

- Psáře (121)
- Dubovka (8)

== Etymology ==
The word psář denoted a person who took care of hunting dogs and trained them. In the days before the village was established, the territory belonged to the royal chamber and there was a fortress where a psář resided.

== Geography ==
Psáře is located about 20 kilometres (12 mi) east of Benešov and 45 km (28 mi) southeast of Prague. It lies in the Vlašim Uplands. The highest point is at 500 m (1,600 ft) above sea level.

== History ==
The first written mention of Psáře is from 1352. Dubovka was first mentioned in 1471.

== Demographics ==
Historical population

| Year | Pop. | ±% |
|---|---|---|
| 1869 | 431 | — |
| 1880 | 438 | +1.6% |
| 1890 | 421 | −3.9% |
| 1900 | 410 | −2.6% |
| 1910 | 380 | −7.3% |

| Year | Pop. | ±% |
|---|---|---|
| 1921 | 379 | −0.3% |
| 1930 | 336 | −11.3% |
| 1950 | 256 | −23.8% |
| 1961 | 240 | −6.2% |
| 1970 | 203 | −15.4% |

| Year | Pop. | ±% |
|---|---|---|
| 1980 | 165 | −18.7% |
| 1991 | 137 | −17.0% |
| 2001 | 121 | −11.7% |
| 2011 | 126 | +4.1% |
| 2021 | 129 | +2.4% |

Source: Censuses

== Transport ==
The D1 motorway from Prague to Brno passes through the municipality.

== Sights ==
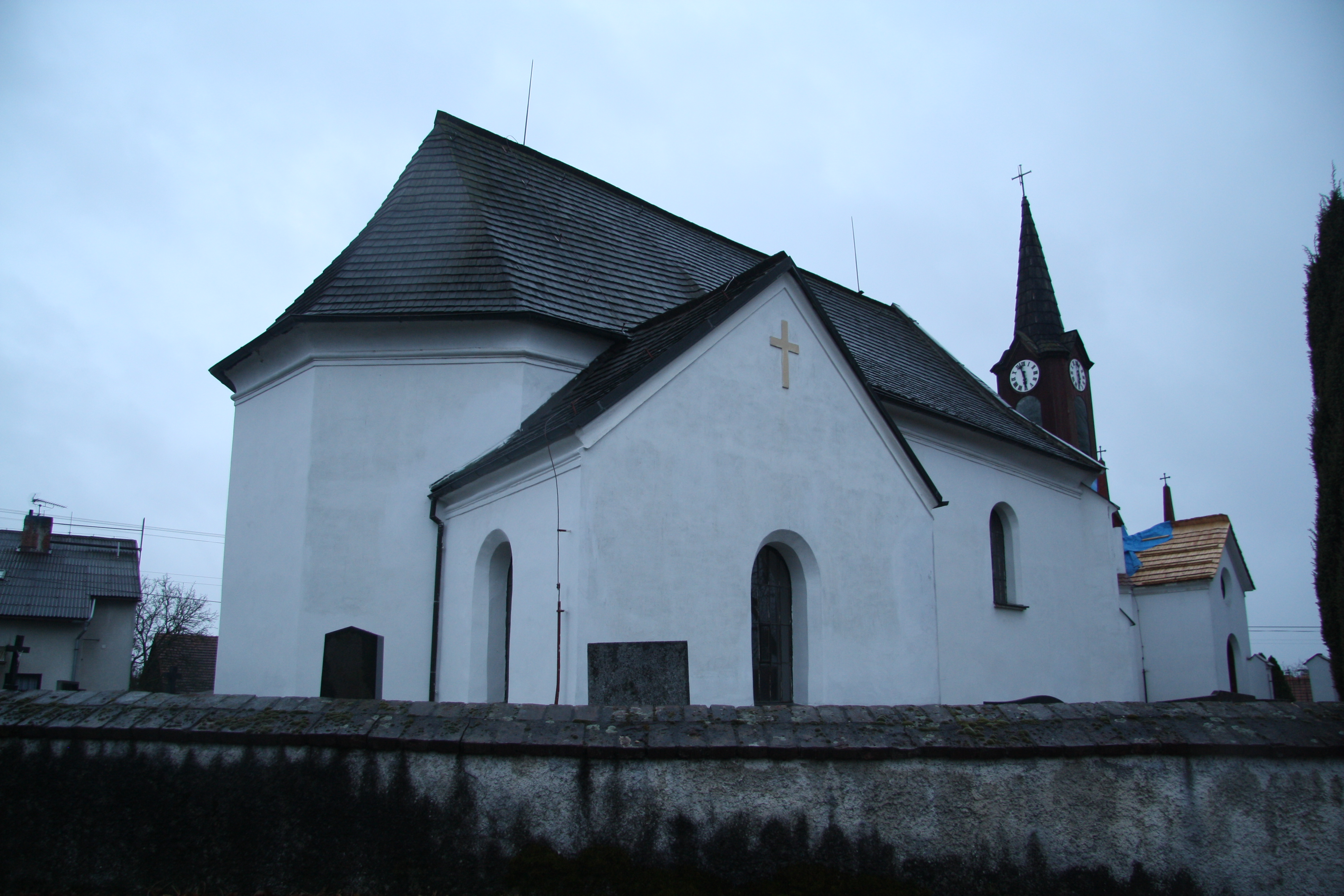
Church of the Holy Trinity

The main landmark of Psáře is the Church of the Holy Trinity. It is a Gothic church, rebuilt to its present form in 1863–1864. Next to the church is an architecturally unique morgue with a belfry in the attic.
