= Artstetten Castle =

Coordinates: 48°14′33″N 15°12′09″E

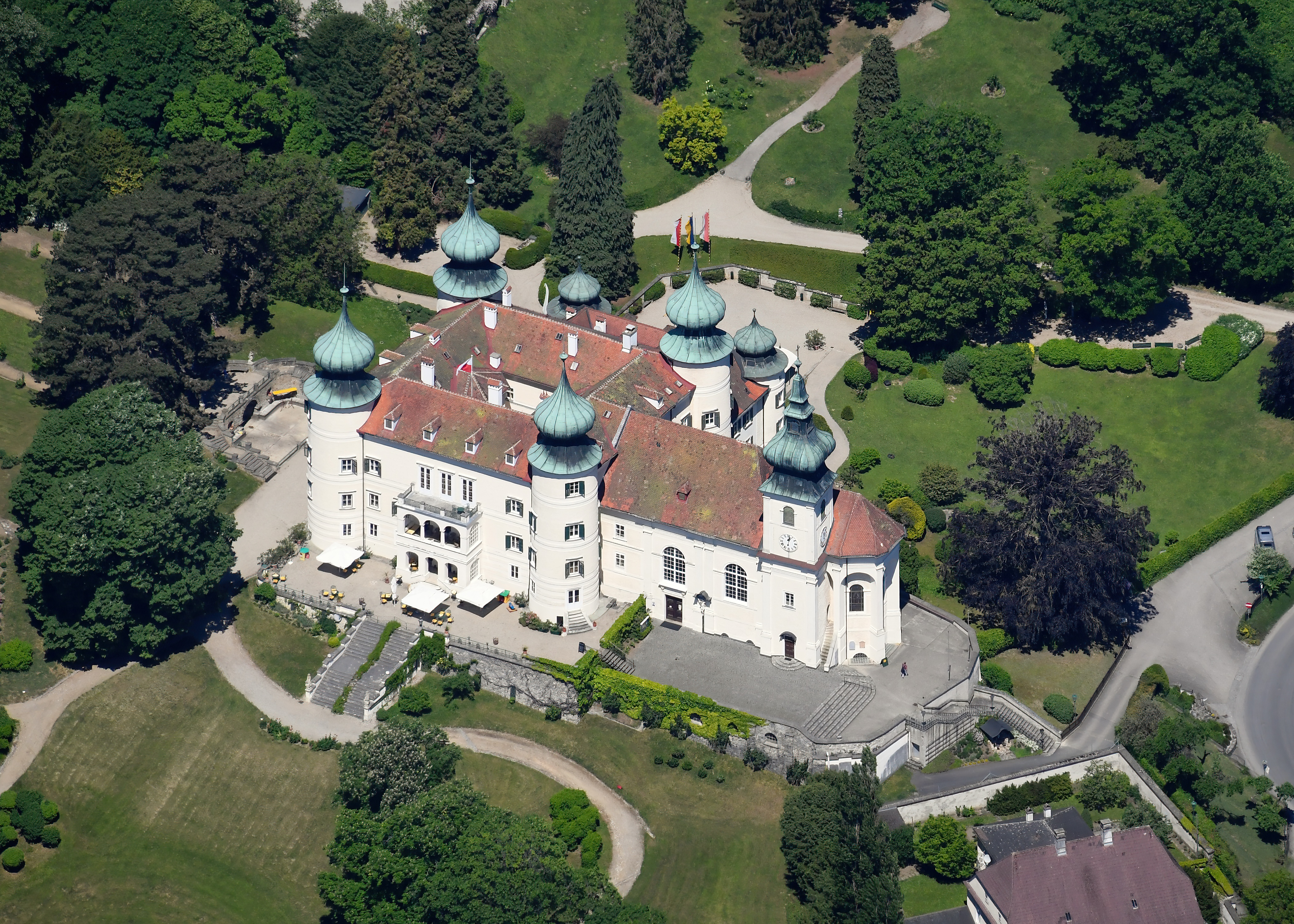

General information
- Location: Artstetten-Pöbring, Austria

Artstetten Castle (German: Schloss Artstetten, pronounced [ˌʃlɔs ˈaʁtʃtɛtn̩]) is a historic Schloss near the Wachau valley in Lower Austria, in the municipality of Artstetten-Pöbring. It is the final resting place of Archduke Franz Ferdinand of Austria and Sophie, Duchess of Hohenberg, whose assassinations were the immediate cause of World War I.

== History ==
Artstetten Castle was owned by a number of families over the centuries until it was purchased in 1823 by Emperor Francis I of Austria. In 1852, Archduke Franz Karl of Austria became the owner, then he gave it in 1861 to his third son, Archduke Karl Ludwig of Austria. In 1889, the property was given to Archduke Franz Ferdinand of Austria, who made extensive renovations to the castle.

Formerly used as a summer residence by members of the Habsburg dynasty, the castle is now the final resting place of Archduke Franz Ferdinand and his morganatic wife Sophie, Duchess of Hohenberg, who were assassinated in 1914. Emperor Franz Joseph I refused to allow them to be interred in the traditional Imperial Crypt at the Capuchin Church, Vienna, because of their morganatic marriage. It also houses the Archduke Franz Ferdinand Museum.

After Konopiště Castle was confiscated by Czechoslovakia in 1921 as part of the confiscation of Habsburg properties under the Treaty of Saint-Germain-en-Laye, Arstetten became the Hohenberg family's primary residence. The castle remains their private property, and parts of the castle are open to the public for visits.

After the Anschluss in 1938, Nazi Germany deported the Hohenbergs to Dachau concentration camp for their anti-Nazi views and confiscated the castle. After the Vienna offensive, the Soviet occupation authorities allowed the residents of Arstetten to elect Duke Maximilian as their mayor, and the Republic of Austria formally returned the castle to the family in 1949, being unable to retain ownership as the Hohenbergs were not covered by the Habsburg Law.

After the death of Franz, Duke of Hohenberg in 1977, the property was deeded to his eldest child, Princess Anita of Hohenberg. The Anita Hohenberg Trust was set up in 2003, and she and her family manage the property.

== Coin ==
Artstetten coin (obverse)

The castle was selected as a main motif for a high-value euro collectors' coin, the Austrian 10 euro Castle of Artstetten commemorative coin, minted on 13 October 2004.

The coin's obverse shows the castle of Artstetten standing above the Danube River on the threshold to the region of Wachau. The reverse shows the entrance to the crypt of the Hohenberg family. There are two portraits on the left, showing Archduke Franz Ferdinand and his wife, Sophie.

== Burials ==
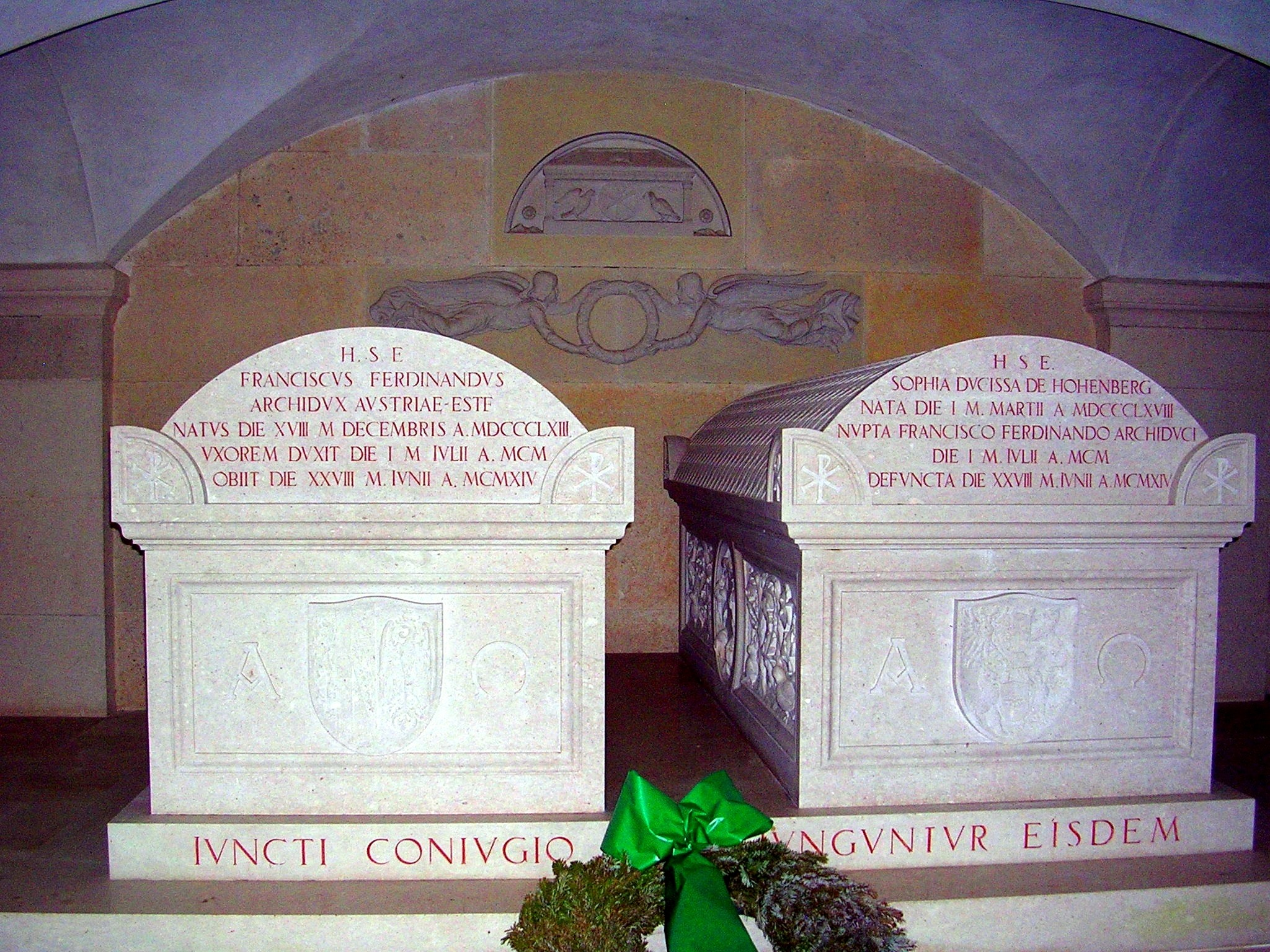
Sarcophagus of Franz Ferdinand, with his wife's sarcophagus on the right

Notable burials in the castle's crypt include:

- Archduke Franz Ferdinand of Austria (1863–1914), heir presumptive to the Austro-Hungarian throne, and his wife Sophie, Duchess of Hohenberg (1868–1914), both assassinated by Gavrilo Princip in Sarajevo on 28 June 1914
- Stillborn third son of Franz Ferdinand and Sophie (1908)
- Prince Ernst of Hohenberg (1904–1954), second son of Franz Ferdinand and Sophie
  - Marie-Thérèse Wood (1910–1985), wife of Ernst
- Maximilian, 1st Duke of Hohenberg (1902–1962), eldest son of Franz Ferdinand and Sophie
  - Countess Maria von Waldburg zu Wolfegg und Waldsee, wife of Maximilian
- Franz, 2nd Duke of Hohenberg (1927–1977), eldest son of Maximilian
  - Princess Elisabeth, Duchess of Hohenberg (1922–2011), wife of Franz and a member of the Grand Ducal Family of Luxembourg
- Georg, 3rd Duke of Hohenberg (1929–2018), second son of Maximilian

== Literature ==
- Stefan Haderer: Artstetten Castle: Residence and final resting place of Archduke Franz Ferdinand of Austria-Este (1863-1914), Heir-Presumptive to the Austro-Hungarian Throne, Royalty Digest Quarterly, Vol. 1/2014, Rosvall Royal Books, Falköping 2014
