= Konopiště Castle =

Castle in Benešov, Czech Republic

- Zámek Konopiště
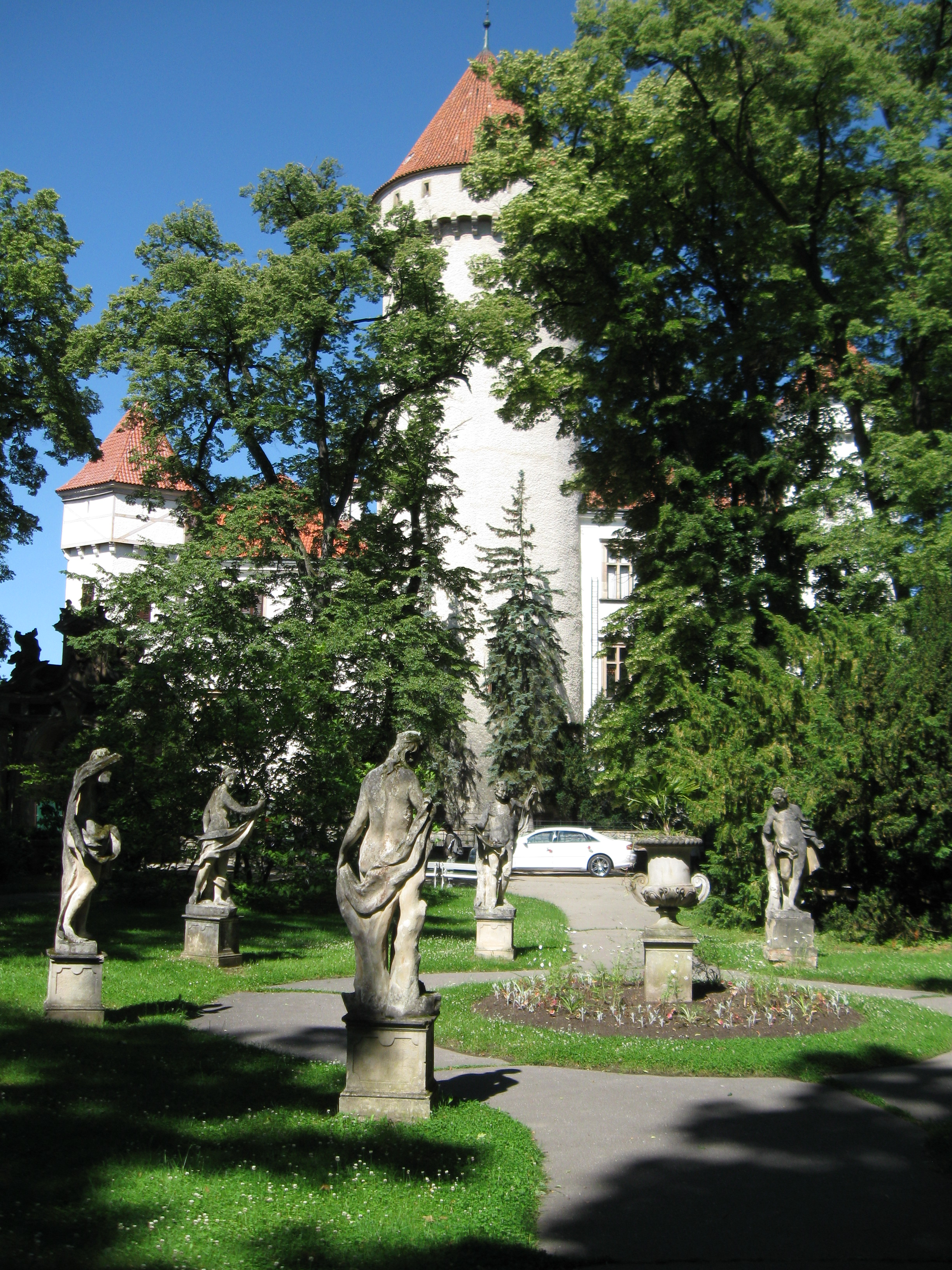
- View of the garden outside the castle

- Location within Czech Republic

General information
- Architectural style: Renaissance-Gothic
- Location: Benešov-Konopiště, Central Bohemian Region, Czech Republic
- Coordinates: 49°46′46″N 14°39′24″E

Website
- www.zamek-konopiste.cz/en/

Konopiště Castle (Czech pronunciation: [ˈkonopɪʃcɛ]; Czech: zámek Konopiště, German: Schloss Konopischt) is a four-winged, three-storey castle located in Konopiště, now a part of the town of Benešov in Central Bohemian Region, Czech Republic. It has become famous as the last residence of Archduke Franz Ferdinand of Austria, heir to the Austro-Hungarian throne, whose assassination in Sarajevo triggered World War I. The bullet that killed him, fired by Gavrilo Princip, is now an exhibit at the castle's remote museum.

== History ==
Children of Franz Ferdinand at Konopiště, 1905–1914, photo by Rudolf Bruner-Dvořák

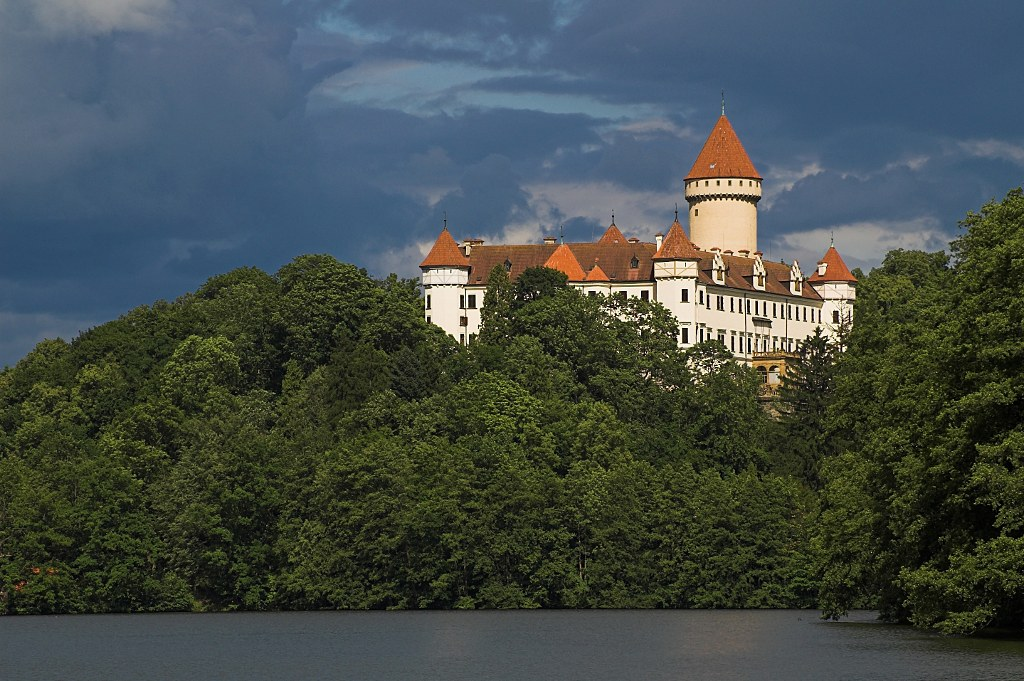
The castle as seen from the lake

The castle was apparently established around 1294 by Prague Bishop Tobiáš of Benešov as a Gothic fortification in the style of a French castle with a rectangular plan and round towers protruding from the corners, making the most effective defence possible. Accounts show that the Benešovic family from nearby Benešov were the owners in 1318, and that in 1327 the castle passed into the hands of the Šternberks. In 1468, it was conquered by the troops of George of Poděbrady after a siege that lasted almost two years.

In 1603, the estate was purchased by Dorota Hodějovská of Hodějov, who made Renaissance alterations to the old gothic fortification. The Hodějovský family fortified their property because of their active participation in the Bohemian Revolt in 1620. Albrecht von Wallenstein acquired the castle, and after him it was passed to Adam Michna of Vacínov. Michna gained notoriety through his repression of the serfs, who revolted against him and conquered Konopiště in 1657.

The Swedes occupied and plundered Konopiště in 1648, and the Vrtba family then purchased the dilapidated structure. After 1725, they had it transformed into a Baroque style château. The drawbridge was replaced by a stone bridge, and near the east tower a new entrance was inserted in the wall. The gate which embellished it was designed by František Maxmilián Kaňka and featured statues from the workshop of Matthias Braun. In 1746, the upper levels of four of the towers were destroyed and one tower was completely demolished. During repair of the interiors, mythological and allegorical frescoes were painted on the ceilings of the great hall, and marble fireplaces with carved decorations by Lazar Wildmann were created.

Archduke Franz Ferdinand of Austria bought Konopiště in 1887 with his inheritance from the deposed Francis V, Duke of Modena. He had it repaired between 1889 and 1894 by the architect Josef Mocker into a luxurious residence, suitable for a future Emperor, which he preferred to his official residence, the Belvedere, Vienna. The extensive 225 ha (550-acre) English landscape garden with terraces, a rose garden and statues, was established at the same time.

He invited Wilhelm II, German Kaiser to see his roses early in June 1914. Insofar as they discussed politics, they discussed Romania, but undocumented conspiracy theories about their planning an attack on Serbia or a division of the Austro-Hungarian Empire arose at the time.

=== State ownership ===
The castle was seized in 1919 and its confiscation was ratified in 1921. Since then, the castle has been the property of the Czechoslovak and later Czech state, one of 90 such properties in state ownership. The Ministry of Culture was said to spend more than US$800,000 per year to maintain the castle, and it recovers about as much from entrance ticket sales and rental fees for occasional functions.

In 2000, Princess Sophie von Hohenberg, great-granddaughter of Franz Ferdinand and his morganatic wife Sophie, Duchess of Hohenberg, filed a lawsuit seeking restitution of the castle to the Hohenberg family. The lawsuit, filed in Benešov, sought restitution of the castle, 6,070 hectares (15,000 acres) of woodland and a brewery. The series of lawsuits was still ongoing in 2013.

== Tourism ==
Konopiště has been open to the public since 1971. Visitors can observe the residential rooms of Franz Ferdinand, who was also an enthusiastic hunter, a large collection of antlers, the "Obizzi-Este collection" (the third largest European collection of armoury and medieval weapons from Castello del Catajo, Padua, Italy), a shooting hall with moving targets, and a garden with Italian Renaissance statues and greenhouses.

== In popular culture ==
Part of the film The Illusionist was filmed in Konopiště, the prince's castle in the movie.

== People ==
- Archduke Franz Ferdinand of Austria, lived there
- Sophie, Duchess of Hohenberg, lived there
- Maximilian, Duke of Hohenberg, lived there
- Prince Ernst von Hohenberg, born there
- Princess Sophie von Hohenberg, born there
