= Hohenberg family =

Austrian noble family

House of Hohenberg
- Haus Habsburg-Hohenberg
- Arms of the Dukes of Hohenberg
- Parent house: Habsburg-Lorraine (agnatic); Chotek (enatic)
- Founded: 1900
- Founder: Sophie, Duchess of Hohenberg
- Current head: Nikolaus, Duke of Hohenberg
- Titles: Duke of Hohenberg; Hereditary Duke of Hohenberg
- Styles: His/Her Highness; His/Her Grace
- Estate: Artstetten Castle

The House of Hohenberg is an Austrian noble family that descends from Countess Sophie Chotek (1868–1914), who in 1900 married Archduke Franz Ferdinand of Austria-Este (1863–1914), the heir presumptive to the throne of the Austro-Hungarian Empire. Since their marriage was morganatic, their children were not in the line of succession to the Austro-Hungarian throne. Although the family is non-dynastic, it is still the senior agnatic line of the House of Habsburg-Lorraine.

== History ==
The House of Hohenberg was established by imperial decree of Emperor Franz Joseph of Austria when, upon the couple's marriage in 1900, he created Franz Ferdinand's wife Fürstin von Hohenberg (Princess of Hohenberg) in her own right with the style of Ihre fürstliche Gnaden (Her Princely Grace) and the specification that this title and style should also be borne by her descendants. In 1905, the Emperor granted Sophie and her descendants the higher style of Durchlaucht (Serene Highness).

In 1909, the Emperor raised Sophie to the more senior title of Herzogin von Hohenberg (Duchess of Hohenberg) with the superior style of Hoheit (Highness) and thereby changed the princely cap on her coat of arms to a duke's crown. Since that title had been granted ad personam, it expired upon Sophie's assassination in 1914.

In 1917, Emperor Charles of Austria granted the eldest son of Franz Ferdinand and Sophie the title of duke with the style of Highness. The other members of the family retained the title of prince or princess with the lesser style of Serene Highness. Thus, Maximilian became the first Duke of Hohenberg, with the dukedom being hereditary according to primogeniture in the male line. Following the collapse of the monarchy, the Austrian nobility – along with hereditary titles and such nobiliary particles as von – was abolished by law in 1919.

In 1938, several members of the family who were opposed to Adolf Hitler were arrested by the Nazis and sent to Dachau concentration camp, most notably Maximilian and his brother Ernst. Another former head of the family, Georg, served as ambassador of the Republic of Austria to the Holy See during part of the pontificate of Pope John Paul II. He was also a Knight of the Golden Fleece.

Members of the Hohenberg family are not only descended from (and married into) the House of Habsburg-Lorraine, but they are also related through marriage to several other European dynasties, including the Grand Ducal Family of Luxembourg and the Princely Family of Liechtenstein. In addition, they descend from King George II of Great Britain through his daughter Anne, Princess Royal and Princess of Orange, and are therefore distantly related to the British royal family.

In his fictional alternative-history trilogy Leviathan, Scott Westerfled focuses on the fictional character Aleksander Hohenberg and his legitimacy to his father's throne after their assassination. Aleksander Hohenberg is therefore loosely based upon Maximilian. In the novels, it is the Pope who legitimizes the marriage between Sophie Chotek and Franz Ferdinand.

== Residences ==
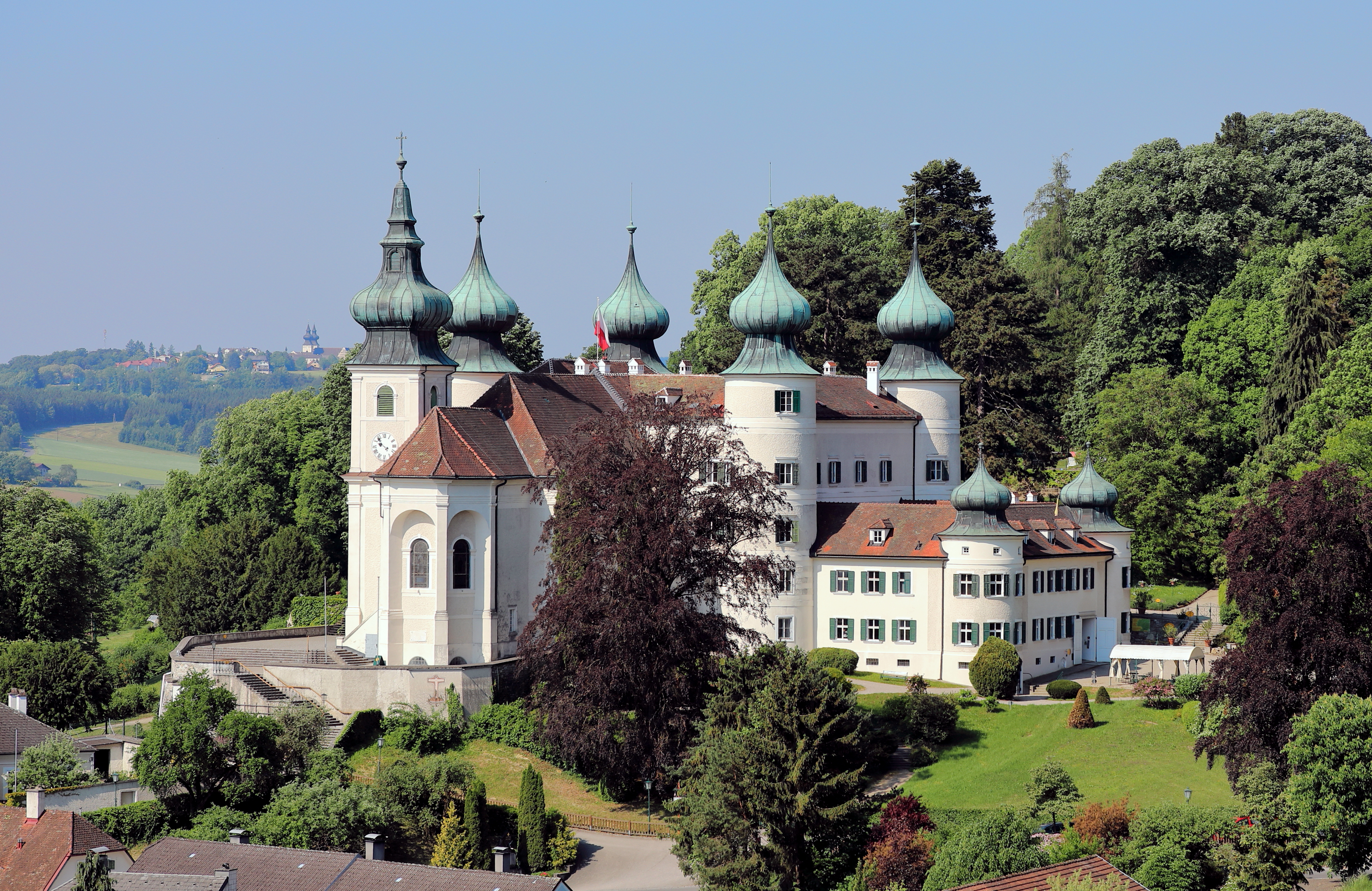
Artstetten Castle in Lower Austria

The Hohenberg family still owns Artstetten Castle in Lower Austria, and parts of this castle are open to the public for visits. Former residences of the family include Konopiště château in Bohemia.

Artstetten Castle was selected to provide the main theme for an Austrian 10 euro commemorative coin, minted on 13 October 2004. The reverse shows the entrance to the crypt of the Hohenberg family. There are two portraits on the left, showing Archduke Franz Ferdinand and his wife Sophie, Duchess of Hohenberg.

== Duchess of Hohenberg (1909–1914) ==
- Sophie (1868–1914), previously Princess of Hohenberg from the time of her marriage in 1900.

== Dukes of Hohenberg (1917–present) ==
- Maximilian (1902–1962), 1st Duke, eldest son of Sophie; with issue.
- Franz (1927–1977), 2nd Duke, eldest son of Maximilian; with issue.
- Georg (1929–2019), 3rd Duke, second son of Maximilian; with issue.
- Nikolaus (born 1961), 4th Duke, eldest son of Georg; with issue.

== Arms ==
Personal arms granted to Sophie upon her marriage in 1900	Personal arms granted to Sophie upon her elevation to Duchess in 1909

Arms of the Dukes of Hohenberg	Arms of the Dukes of Hohenberg (subject to agnatic-primogeniture)

== Line of succession to the ducal title ==
The line of succession to the title of Duke of Hohenberg is as follows:

- Sophie, Duchess of Hohenberg (1868–1914)
  - Maximilian, Duke of Hohenberg (1902–1962)
    - Franz, Duke of Hohenberg (1927–1977)
    - Georg, Duke of Hohenberg (1929–2019)
      - Nikolaus, Duke of Hohenberg (b. 1961)
        - (1) Karl, Hereditary Duke of Hohenberg (b. 1991), heir apparent
          - (2) Felix Hohenberg (b. 2022)
      - (3) Maximilian Hohenberg (b. 1970)
        - (4) Nikolaus Hohenberg (b. 2001)
        - (5) Leopold Hohenberg (b. 2006)
    - Albrecht Hohenberg (1931–2021)
      - (6) Leo Johannes Hohenberg (b. 1964)
        - (7) Adrien Hohenberg (b. 2003)
    - Prince Johannes of Hohenberg (1933–2003)
      - (8) Stephan Hohenberg (b. 1972)
        - (9) Nepomuk Hohenberg (b. 2005)
      - (10) Georg Hohenberg (b. 1975)
    - Peter Hohenberg (1936–2017)
    - Gerhard Hohenberg (1941–2019)
  - Ernst Hohenberg (1904–1954)
    - Franz Ferdinand Hohenberg (1937–1978)
      - (11) Franz Ferdinand Hohenberg (b. 1969)
        - (12) Maximilian Hohenberg (b. 2001)
    - Ernst Hohenberg (1944–2023)
