= Benešov =

Town in the Czech Republic

- Town
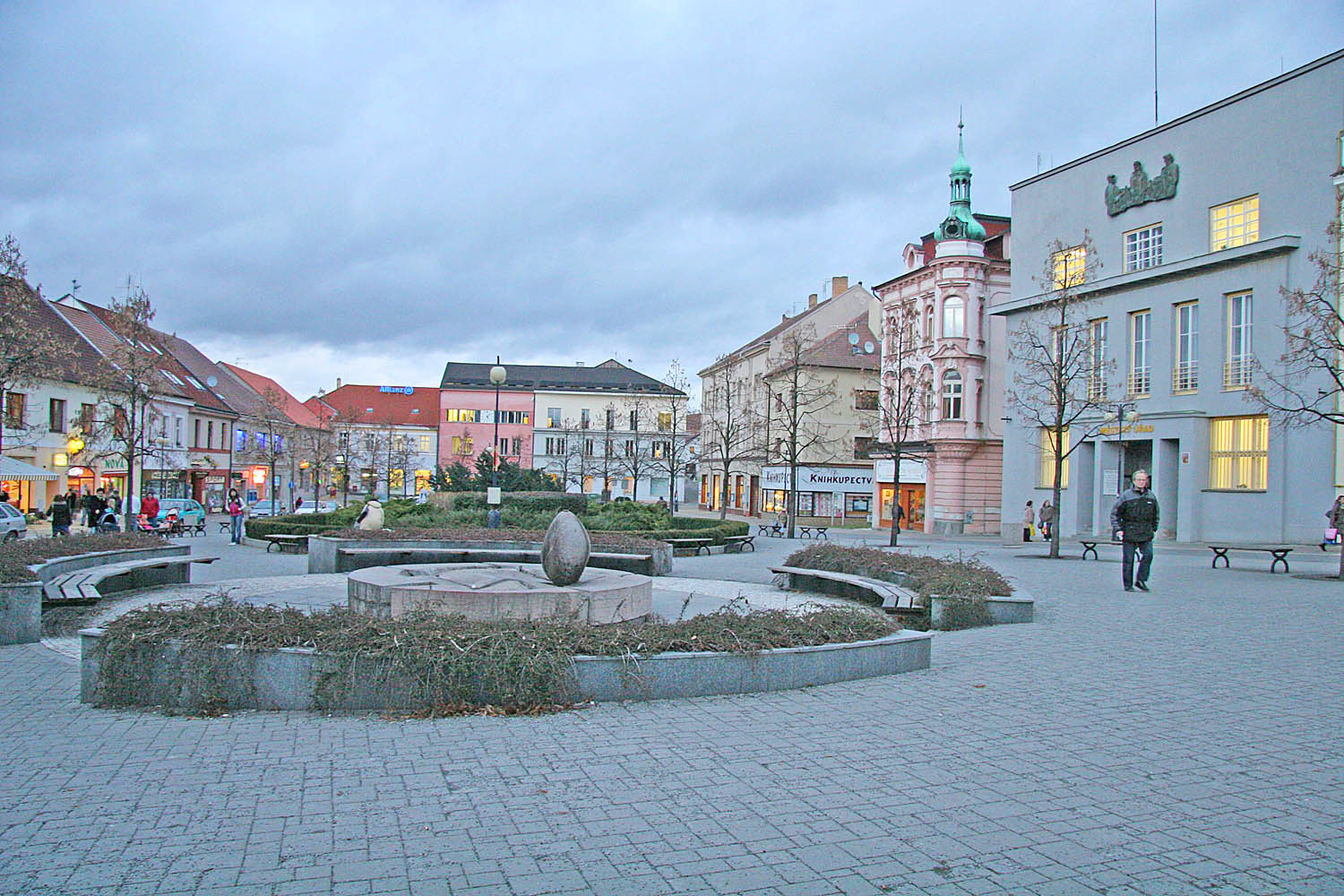
- The square Masarykovo náměstí

- Flag Coat of arms

- Location in the Czech Republic
- Coordinates: 49°46′58″N 14°41′19″E
- Country: Czech Republic
- Region: Central Bohemian
- District: Benešov
- First mentioned: 1219

Government
  - Mayor: Jakub Hostek

Area
  - Total: 46.87 km^{2} (18.10 sq mi)
- Elevation: 368 m (1,207 ft)

Population (2026-01-01)
  - Total: 17,025
  - Density: 363.2/km^{2} (940.8/sq mi)
- Time zone: UTC+1 (CET)
  - Summer (DST): UTC+2 (CEST)
- Postal code: 256 01
- Website: www.benesov-city.cz

Benešov (Czech pronunciation: [ˈbɛnɛʃof]; German: Beneschau) is a town in the Central Bohemian Region of the Czech Republic. It has about 17,000 inhabitants. The town is located on the stream Benešovský potok in the Benešov Uplands.

Benešov is known for the Konopiště Castle, which is protected as a national cultural monument.

== Administrative division ==
Benešov consists of 15 municipal parts (in brackets population according to the 2021 census):

- Benešov (15,232)
- Baba (1)
- Bedrč (127)
- Boušice (49)
- Buková Lhota (127)
- Červený Dvůr (14)
- Chvojen (12)
- Dlouhé Pole (114)
- Konopiště (54)
- Mariánovice (203)
- Okrouhlice (66)
- Pomněnice (63)
- Radíkovice (13)
- Úročnice (246)
- Vidlákova Lhota (48)

== Etymology ==
The name Benešov is derived from the personal name Beneš, meaning "Beneš's (castle, court)".

== Geography ==
Benešov is located about 32 kilometres (20 mi) southeast of Prague. It lies in the Benešov Uplands. The highest point is the hill U Vlčí jámy at 493 m (1,617 ft) above sea level. The stream Benešovský potok flows through the town. In the western part of the municipal territory are situated the fishponds Konopišťský rybník and Jarkovický rybník.

== History ==
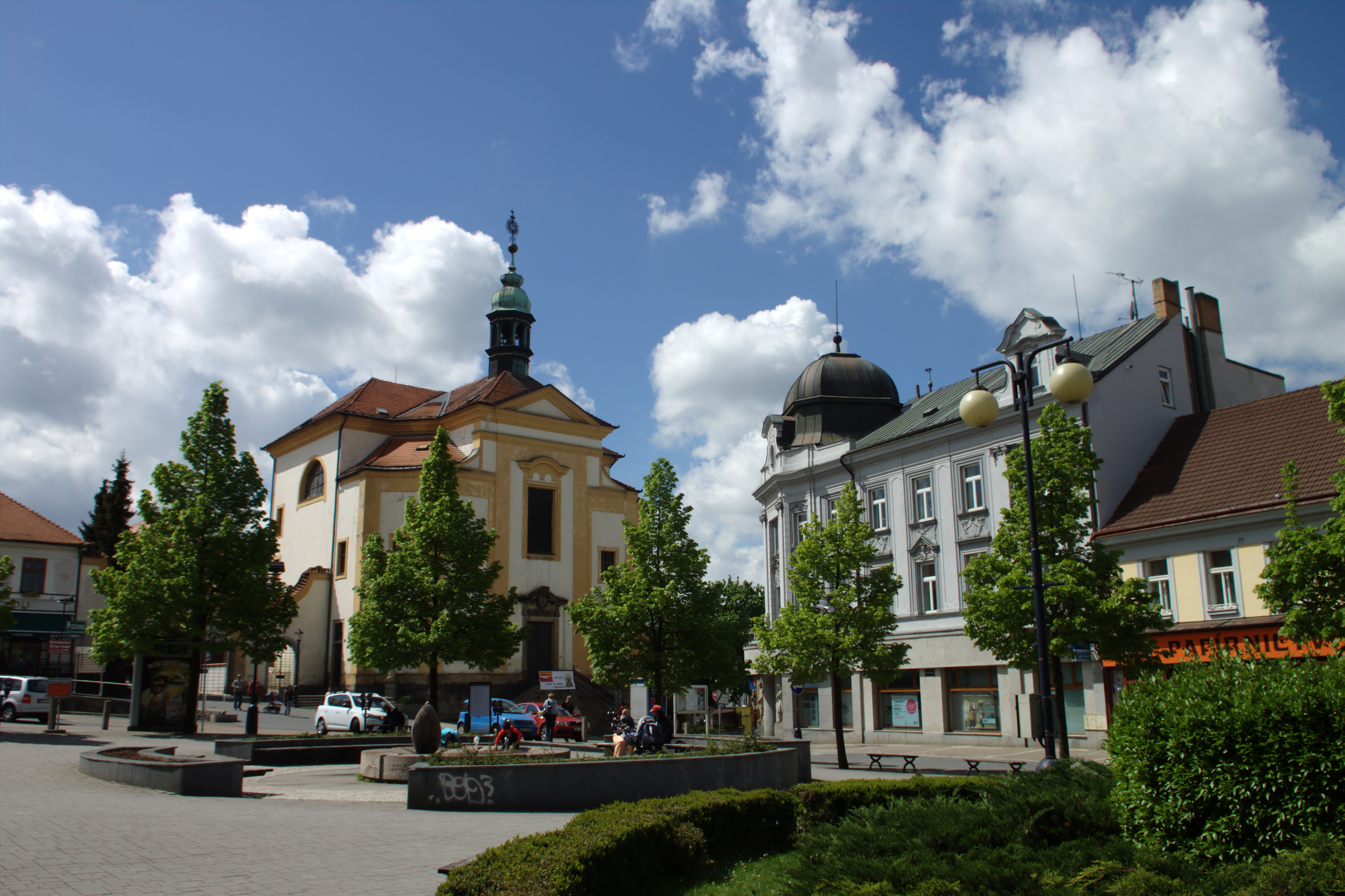
Masarykovo náměstí with Church of Saint Anne

The area of Benešov began to be settled around the 11th century. The first settlers are believed to have arrived on the hill Karlov around the year 1050 during the rule of the Přemyslid dynasty. The first written verified mention of Benešov is from the period 1219–1222, however there are unverified mentions from 1048 and 1070.

Benešov was seat of the Lords of Benešov until 1317, when they moved to nearby Konopiště Castle. In 1327, Benešov became a market town. In 1420, the town was conquered and burned by the Hussites. However, Benešov recovered and at the end of the 15th century, it belonged among the most important towns in Bohemia. It was the centre of several political negotiations, such as the 1451 and 1473 meetings of the Bohemian Diet. In the 15th and 16th centuries the town experienced an economic boom, especially thanks to its location on the trade route from Prague to Linz. In 1512, Benešov became a town.

During the Thirty Years' War, the population had suffered, when the Swedish troops fought here. In the 18th century, when Benešov was owned by the Přehořovský family and then by the Lords of Vrtba, the town became a centre of education and culture, which was also helped by the founding of the Piarist college. The development was also aided by the establishment of a direct postal line to Prague in the first half of the 18th century. In 1871, the town was connected to Prague by rail.

During World War II, in 1942, part of the town was evacuated temporarily as the training area of the Waffen SS was stationed here.

== Demographics ==
Historical population

Year	Pop.	±%
1869	5,345	—
1880	6,240	+16.7%
1890	7,413	+18.8%
1900	8,450	+14.0%
1910	8,857	+4.8%

Year	Pop.	±%
1921	9,304	+5.0%
1930	9,820	+5.5%
1950	10,387	+5.8%
1961	9,774	−5.9%
1970	10,769	+10.2%

Year	Pop.	±%
1980	14,258	+32.4%
1991	15,892	+11.5%
2001	16,323	+2.7%
2011	16,264	−0.4%
2021	16,369	+0.6%

Source: Censuses

== Economy ==
The largest industrial company based in the town is BCS Automotive Interface Solutions, an automotive electronics manufacturer with more than 250 employees. The largest non-industrial employer is the Benešov Hospital.

== Transport ==
The I/3 road (part of the European route E55), which connects the D1 motorway with Tábor and further continues as the D3 motorway, runs through the town.

The Benešov u Prahy railway station is located on the lines Prague–České Budějovice and Benešov–Vlašim.

== Sights ==
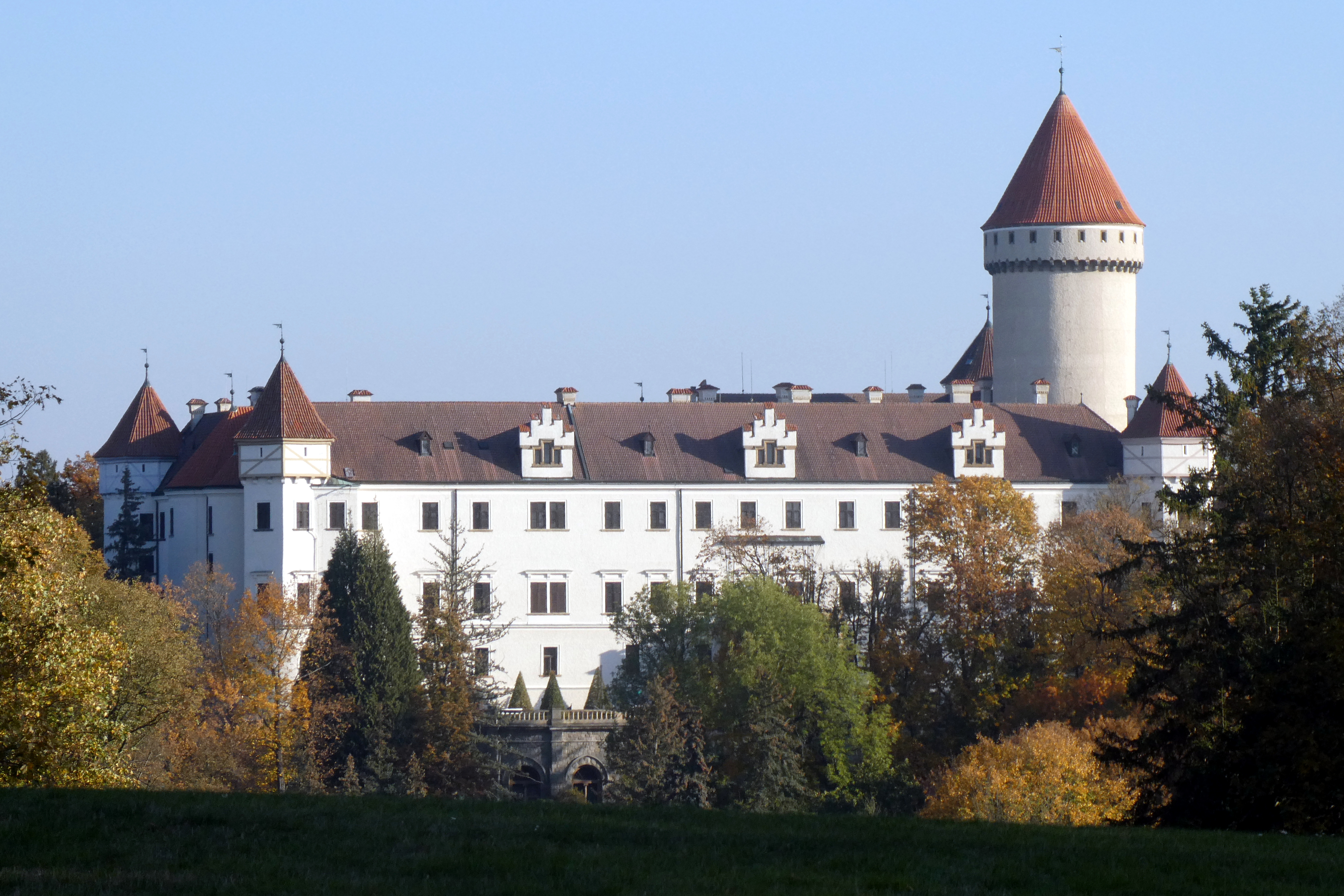
Konopiště Castle

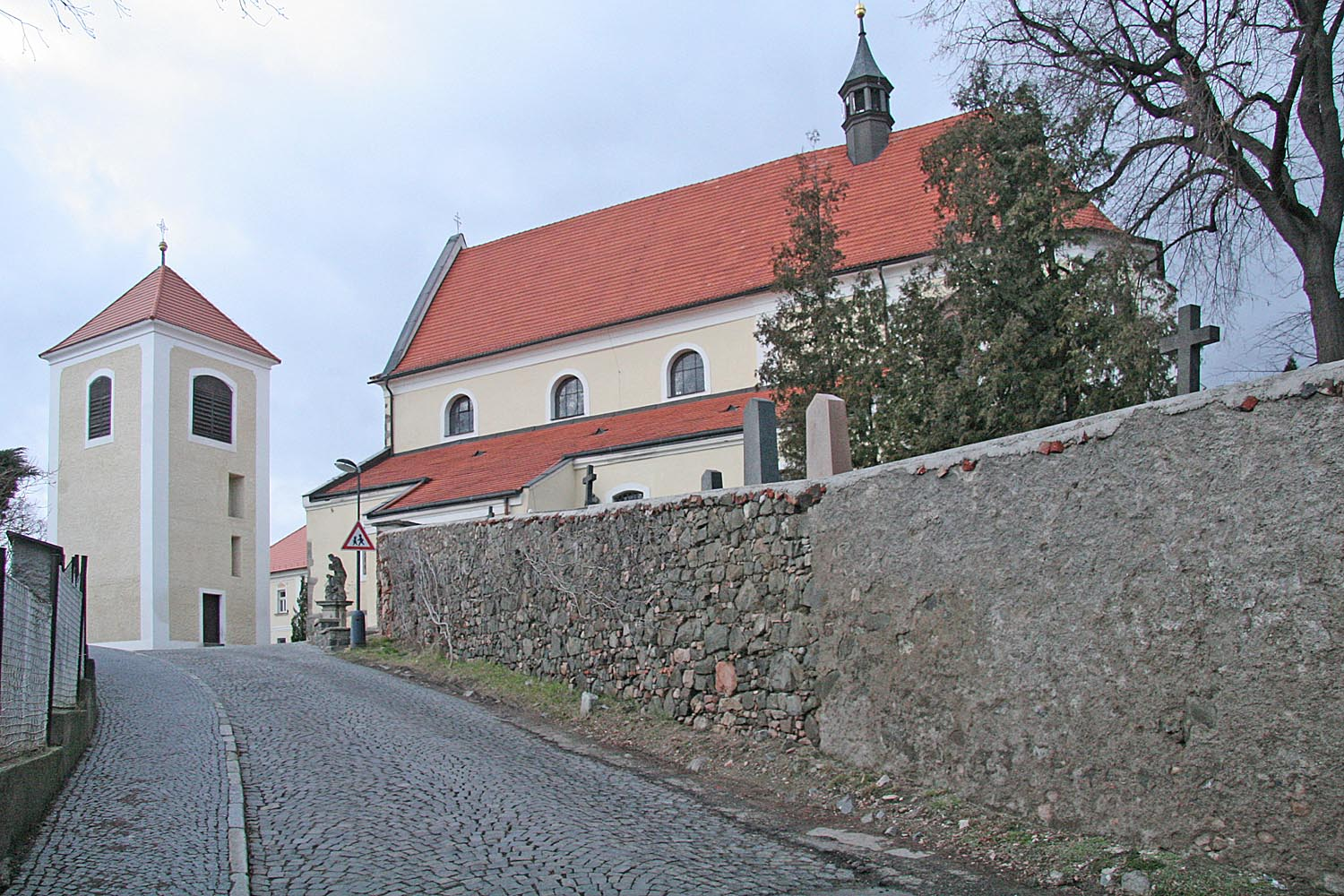
Church of Saint Nicholas

The most significant monument is the Konopiště Castle. It is the most visited tourist destination in Benešov District, with about 74,000 to 85,000 visitors annually. It was built in 1294 as a copy of French fortresses. Around 1500, it was modified to the late Gothic style, and in 1605 to the Renaissance style. After 1725, it was rebuilt in the Baroque style. For its value, it is protected as a national cultural monument.

The Church of Saint Nicholas is the oldest preserved monument in Benešov. It was built in early Gothic style in the second half of the 13th century. After a fire in 1420, it was rebuilt in the Renaissance style in 1583, and later once again in the Baroque style. The church includes a Gothic bell from 1322, one of the oldest preserved bells in the Czech Republic.

Another important religious monument is the former Piarist college with the Church of Saint Anne. They were built in the Baroque style in 1705–1706, according to the plans submitted by the Italian architect Giovanni Battista Alliprandi.

The town centre with the square Masarykovo náměstí includes Baroque and Art Nouveau houses and the architecturally awarded building of the new town hall.

== Notable people ==
- Josef Suk (1874–1935), composer and violinist; lived and died here
- Karel Nový (1890–1980), writer
- Princess Sophie of Hohenberg (1901–1990), Austrian princess
- Prince Ernst of Hohenberg (1904–1954), Austrian prince
- Miroslav Beránek (born 1957), football player and manager
- Michal Hocek (born 1969), chemist
- Monika Absolonová (born 1976), singer and actress
- Jitka Bartoničková (born 1985), athlete
- Aneta Langerová (born 1986), pop singer
- Martin Macík (born 1989), rally raid truck driver

== Twin towns – sister cities ==
Benešov is twinned with:

- Partizánske, Slovakia
- Sainte-Agnès, France
