= Prince Ernst of Hohenberg =

Austrian nobleman (1904-1954)

Prince Ernst
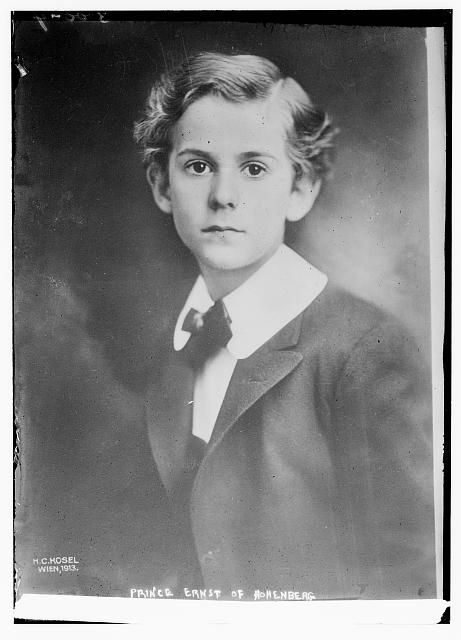
- Prince Ernst of Hohenberg in 1913
- Born: 27 May 1904; Konopiště, Bohemia, Austro Hungarian Empire
- Died: 5 March 1954 (aged 49); Graz, Austria
- Noble family: Hohenberg
- Spouse: Marie-Thérèse Wood (m. 1936)
- Issue: Prince Franz; Prince Ernst
- Father: Archduke Franz Ferdinand of Austria
- Mother: Sophie, Duchess of Hohenberg

Prince Ernst of Hohenberg (Ernst Alfons Franz Ignaz Joseph Maria Anton von Hohenberg; 27 May 1904 – 5 March 1954) was the second son of Archduke Franz Ferdinand of Austria and his morganatic wife Sophie, Duchess of Hohenberg, who were assassinated at Sarajevo in 1914.

== Life ==
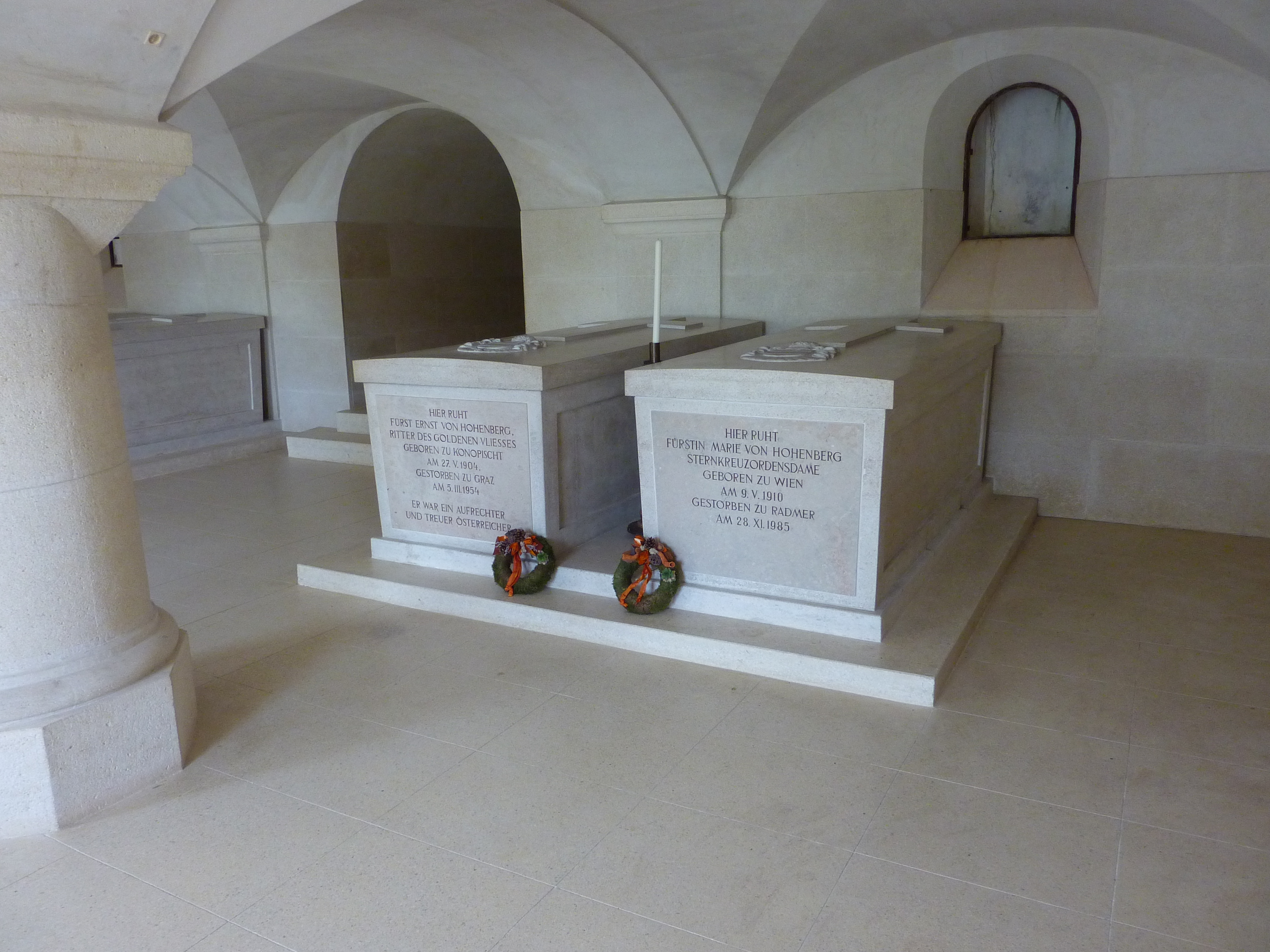
Sarcophagus of Prince Ernst, with his wife's sarcophagus on the right

Prince Ernst was born at his parents' estate at Konopiště in Bohemia. Following his parents' assassination, which helped trigger the outbreak of World War I, Ernst and his siblings, Sophie and Maximilian, were taken in by their uncle, Prince Jaroslav von Thun und Hohenstein.

In late 1918, their properties in Czechoslovakia, including Konopiště and Chlumec nad Cidlinou, were confiscated. The children moved to Vienna and Schloß Artstetten.

In 1938, following the Anschluss, some of the family members were arrested. Prince Ernst, having previously spoken at pro-monarchist meetings and having publicly opposed the Anschluss, was sent to Dachau concentration camp with his brother. Prince Ernst was later transferred to other camps and was freed in 1943. The family's Austrian properties were confiscated in 1939. Following World War II they regained possession, and Artstetten Castle was formally restored to the family in 1949.

== Marriage and issue ==
Prince Ernst married on 25 May 1936 in Vienna, Marie-Thérèse Wood. She was the daughter of Captain George Jervis Wood, son of Nicholas Wood and Edith Florence Jervis, and his wife, Countess Rosa Lónyay de Nagy-Lónya et Vásáros-Namény, daughter of Count Albert Lónyay de Nagy-Lónya et Vásáros-Namény and Princess Marie of Hohenlohe-Bartenstein, elder sister of Princess Eleonora Fugger von Babenhausen. The couple had two sons:

- Prince Franz Ferdinand Maximilian Georg Ernst Maria Josef Zacharius Ignaz of Hohenberg (14 March 1937 in Vienna – 8 August 1978 in Graz), married Heide Zechling (born 4 January 1941 in Eisenerz). They have one son.
- Prince Ernst Georg Elemer Albert Josef Antonius Peregrinus Rupertus Maria of Hohenberg (1 March 1944 in Vienna – 12 January 2023), first married Patricia Caesar (born 12 June 1950 in Glen Cove) in 1973; they divorced in 1999. In 2007 he married Margareta Anna Ndisi (born 26 November 1959 in Östhammar). He has one daughter from his first marriage.

== Death ==
Prince Ernst died at Graz in Austria in 1954, aged 49, his death considered to be connected to mistreatment he suffered in the concentration camps. He is buried in the crypt of the Hohenberg family's Artstetten Castle in Lower Austria. His wife's remains are in a sarcophagus to his right.

== Honours ==
- (Austria-Hungary) Austro-Hungarian Imperial and Royal Family: Knight of the Order of the Golden Fleece, 1945.
