= Artstetten-Pöbring =

- Municipality
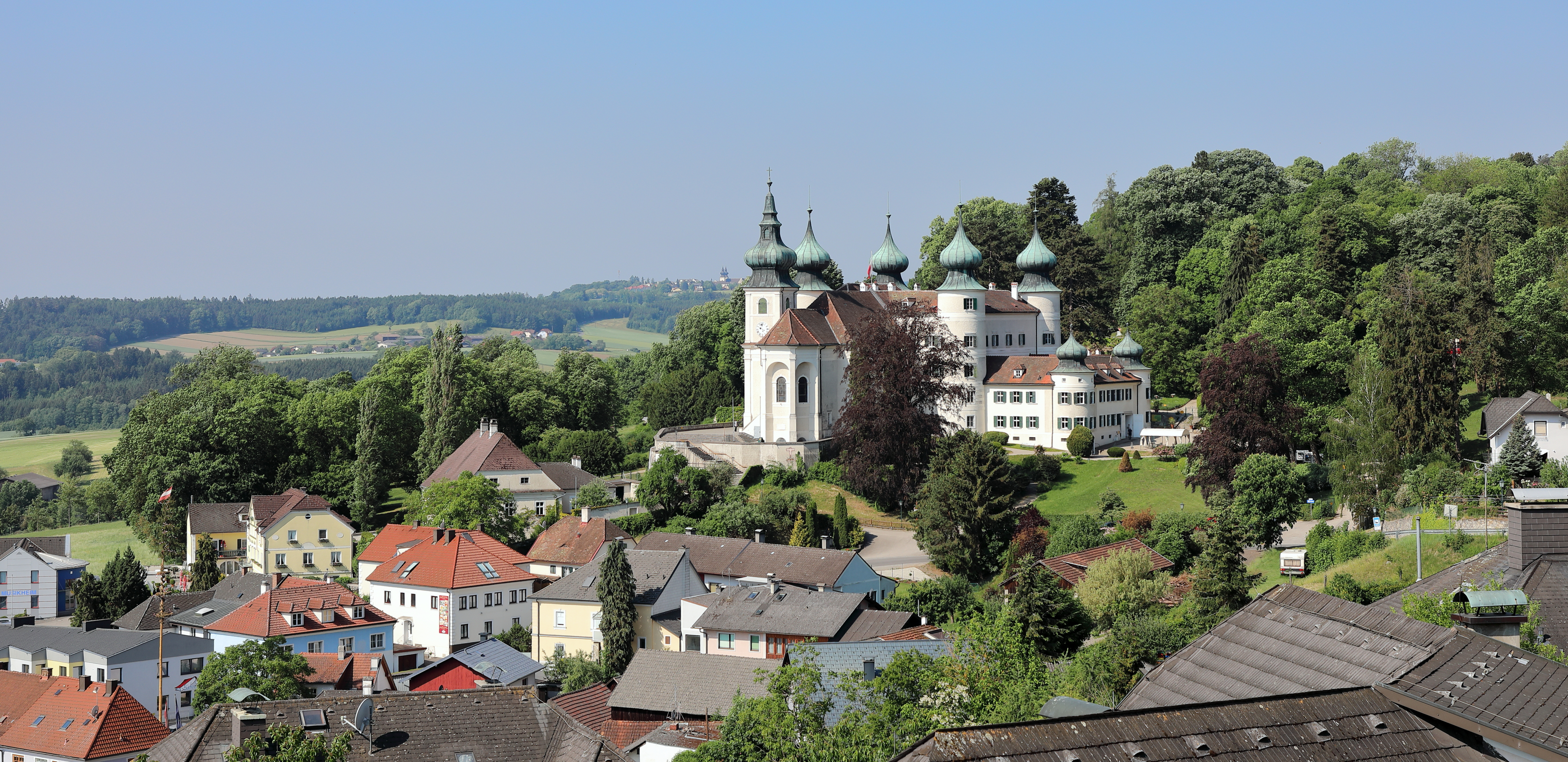

- Coat of arms

- Location within Austria
- Coordinates: 48°15′N 15°12′E
- Country: Austria
- State: Lower Austria
- District: Melk

Government
  - Mayor: Karl Höfer

Area
  - Total: 27.32 km^{2} (10.55 sq mi)
- Elevation: 395 m (1,296 ft)

Population (2018-01-01)
  - Total: 1,184
  - Density: 43.34/km^{2} (112.2/sq mi)
- Time zone: UTC+1 (CET)
  - Summer (DST): UTC+2 (CEST)
- Postal code: 3661
- Area code: 07413
- Website: www.artstetten.at

Artstetten-Pöbring is a town in the district of Melk in the Austrian state of Lower Austria. It was created in 1967 by merging Artstetten, Fritzelsdorf, Nussendorf, Harth, Pöbring and Payerstetten.

Archduke Franz Ferdinand of Austria and his wife, Sophie, Duchess of Hohenberg, were buried in a crypt underneath Artstetten Castle's church in 1914.

Places of interest include Artstetten Castle, Arstetten Castle Park, and the Archduke Franz Ferdinand Museum.

== Population ==
Historical population
Year	Pop.	±%
1971	1,148	—
1981	1,143	−0.4%
1991	1,170	+2.4%
2001	1,178	+0.7%
2011	1,164	−1.2%
2021	1,241	+6.6%
2025	1,263	+1.8%
