= Georg Christian, Prince of Lobkowicz =

Austro-Bohemian noble and politician

Georg Christian
- Prince of Lobkowicz
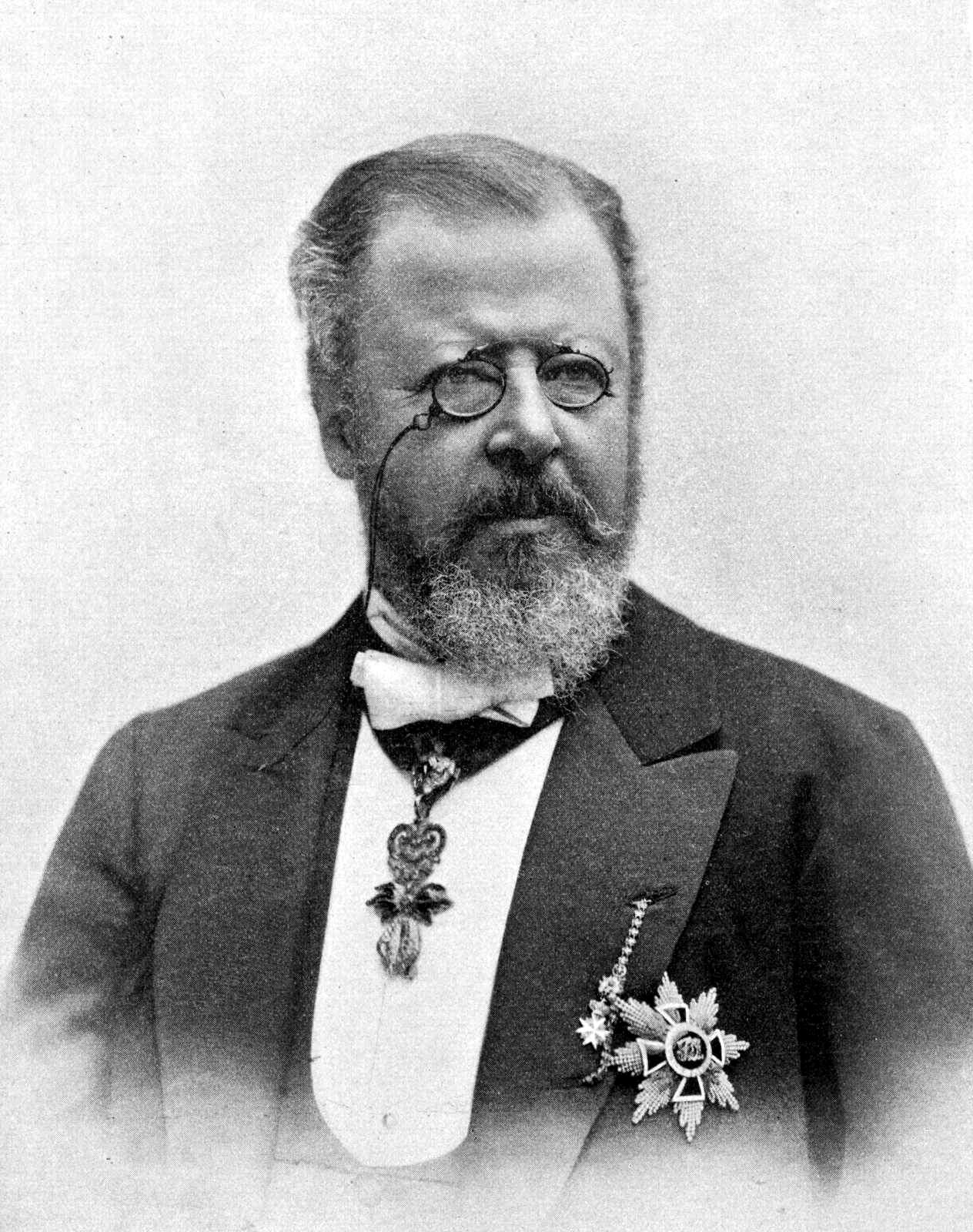
- Georg Christian, Prince of Lobkowicz
- Born: 14 May 1835; Vienna, Austrian Empire
- Died: 22 December 1908 (aged 73); Prague, Austria-Hungary
- Noble family: House of Lobkowicz
- Spouse: Princess Anna Maria von und zu Liechtenstein (m. 1864)
- Issue: 12
- Father: August Longin, Prince of Lobkowicz
- Mother: Sidonia, Countess Kinsky

Georg Christian, Prince of Lobkowicz (Czech: Jiří Kristián z Lobkovic; 14 May 1835 – 22 December 1908) was an Austro-Bohemian noble and politician. He was member of the old Bohemian aristocratic Lobkowicz family and an influential politician of late 19th century Bohemia and Austria-Hungary. He was a Prince (Fürst) of Lobkowicz.

== Early life ==
Born in Vienna as a son of August Longin, Prince of Lobkowicz, and his wife Sidonia, née Countess Kinsky, he was one of the political leaders of the conservative Bohemian nobility. His sister, Princess Rosa von Lobkowitz, married Count Erwin von Neipperg (a stepson of Empress Marie Louise, the widow of Napoleon who was also the eldest child of Francis II, Holy Roman Emperor).

== Career ==
From 1865 to 1872 and, again, from 1883 to 1907, Lobkowicz was a member of the Bohemian Diet, presiding over it from 1871 to 1872 and, again, from 1883 to 1907 as Land Marshal of Bohemia. He served as deputy in the Abgeordnetenhaus of the Austrian Parliament (Reichsrat) from 1879 to 1883 and became a hereditary member of the Herrenhaus in 1883. In 1871, he was involved in negotiations concerning the relationship between Bohemia and Austria.

== Personal life ==
He married Princess Anna Maria von und zu Liechtenstein (1846–1924), of the House of Liechtenstein, in Vienna on 22 May 1864, by whom he had 12 children, including John Adolph of Lobkowicz, Frederick of Lobkowicz, Marie Theresia, Prinzessin von Lobkowicz, Therese Prinzessin von Lobkowicz, Rosa Prinzessin von Lobkowicz, Anna Bertha, Prinzessin von Lobkowicz, and Sidonie von Lobkowitz (wife of Maximilian von Waldburg-Wolfegg-Waldsee). He died in Prague.

=== Descendants ===
His daughter, Marie, Princess of Lobkowicz, married Karl, Count of Eltz, the grandfather of Christiane, Countess of Eltz, the mother of Karl-Theodor zu Guttenberg. His son, known as Jiři Lobkowicz, was a racing driver, who was killed at the Nurburgring in 1932.

== Orders and decorations ==
- Austria-Hungary:
  - Grand Cross of the Imperial Order of Leopold, 1891
  - Knight of the Golden Fleece, 1903
  - Grand Cross of St. Stephen, 1905
- Sovereign Military Order of Malta: Knight of Honour and Devotion

== Ancestry ==
Ancestors of Georg Christian, Prince of Lobkowicz

16. Johann Georg Christian, Prince of Lobkowicz
8. August Anton, Prince of Lobkowicz
17. Countess Maria Henriette Waldstein-Wartenberg
4. Anton Isidor, Prince of Lobkowicz
18. Count František Antonín Czernin z Chudenic
9. Countess Maria Ludmilla Czernin z Chudenic
19. Isabella Johanna Maria, Countess de Mérode
2. August Longin, Prince of Lobkowicz
20. Franz Ulrich, 3rd Prince Kinský z Vchynic a Tetova
10. Joseph, 4th Prince Kinský z Vchynic a Tetova
21. Countess Sidonie Hohenzollern-Hechingen
5. Countess Maria Sidonia Kinská z Vchynic a Tetova
22. Count Ferdinand Bonaventura II. Harrach of Rohrau and Thannhausen
11. Countess Rosa Harrach of Rohrau and Thannhausen
23. Countess Maria Rosa Harrach of Rohrau and Thannhausen
1. Georg Christian, Prince of Lobkowicz
24. Joseph I. Adam, 4th Prince of Schwarzenberg
12. Johann I. Joseph, 5th Prince of Schwarzenberg
25. Princess Theresia of Liechtenstein
6. Joseph II. Johann, 6th Prince of Schwarzenberg
26. Count Philipp Charles Oettingen-Wallerstein
13. Countess Marie Eleonore Oettingen-Wallerstein
27. Countess Charlotte Juliane Oettingen-Baldern
3. Princess Bertha of Schwarzenberg
28. Charles Marie Raymond, Prince and 5th Duke of Arenberg
14. Louis Engelbert, 6th Duke of Arenberg
29. Louise Marguerite, Countess de La Marck and de Schleiden
7. Princess and Duchess Pauline d'Arenberg
30. Louis Léon Félicité de Brancas, Duke de Lauraquais, Duke de Brancas
15. Louise Antoinette de Brancas-Villars, Comtesse de Lauraquais
31. Princess Elisabeth Pauline de Gand-Vilain de Mérode Montmorency
