= Sophie, Duchess of Hohenberg =

Wife of Archduke Franz Ferdinand (1868–1914)

Sophie
- Duchess of Hohenberg
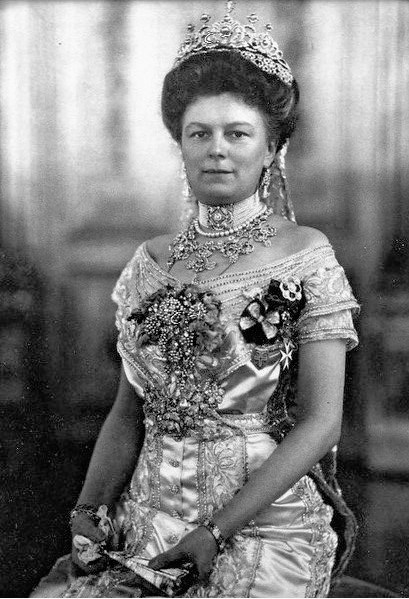
- Sophie c. 1910
- Full name: Sophie Maria Josephine Albina Chotek von Chotkow und Wognin
- Born: 1 March 1868; Stuttgart, Kingdom of Württemberg
- Died: 28 June 1914 (aged 46); Sarajevo, Austria-Hungary
- Cause of death: Assassination
- Buried: Artstetten Castle, Artstetten-Pöbring
- Noble family: Chotek; Hohenberg (founded)
- Spouse: Archduke Franz Ferdinand of Austria (m. 1900)
- Issue: Princess Sophie of Hohenberg; Maximilian, Duke of Hohenberg; Prince Ernst of Hohenberg
- Father: Count Bohuslaw Chotek von Chotkow und Wognin
- Mother: Countess Wilhelmine Kinsky von Wchinitz und Tettau

Sophie, Duchess of Hohenberg (German: Sophie Marie Josephine Albina Gräfin Chotek von Chotkow und Wognin; Czech: Žofie Marie Josefína Albína hraběnka Chotková z Chotkova a Vojnína; 1 March 1868 – 28 June 1914) was the wife of Archduke Franz Ferdinand of Austria, the heir to the Austro-Hungarian throne. Their assassination in Sarajevo sparked a series of events that led, four weeks later, to World War I.

== Early life and ancestry ==
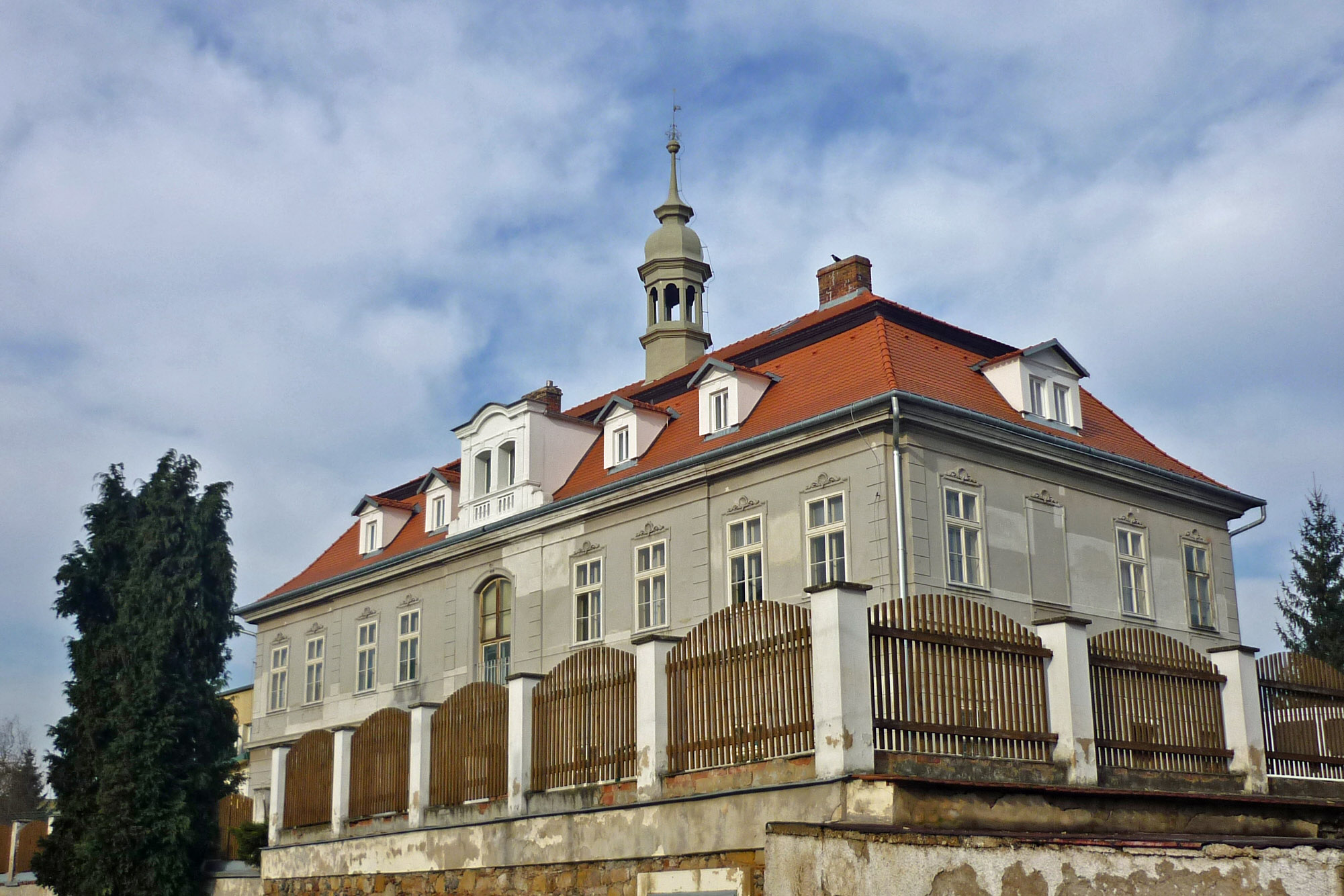
Sophie's childhood residence: Old castle in Velké Březno, Ústí nad Labem Disctrict, Czech Republic

Countess Sophie Chotek von Wognin was born in Stuttgart as the fifth child and fourth daughter of Count Bohuslav Chotek von Chotkow und Wognin and his wife, Countess Wilhelmine Kinsky von Wchinitz und Tettau (1838–1886). Her father was a Bohemian aristocrat, by birth a member of an old House of Chotek, who served as an Austrian ambassador to the royal courts of Stuttgart, Saint Petersburg and Brussels.

Sophie and her siblings spent their youth in the old castle of Velké Březno, which was owned by her father, Count Bohuslav Chotek von Wognin, an estate intentionally designed to look almost identical to the Upper Březno castle owned by another branch of the Chotek family.

After the death of her parents, Sophie became a lady-in-waiting to Archduchess Isabella, the wife of Archduke Friedrich, Duke of Teschen, head of the Bohemian cadet branch of the House of Habsburg-Lorraine.

== Courtship with Franz Ferdinand ==
It is unknown where Sophie first met Archduke Franz Ferdinand, although it may have been at a ball in Prague in 1894. Franz Ferdinand, who was stationed at a military garrison in Prague, paid frequent visits to Halbturn Castle, the home of Archduke Friedrich, and it was assumed that he had fallen in love with Friedrich's eldest daughter, Archduchess Marie Christine. The liaison was discovered by Archduchess Isabella, herself only born into a mediatised family (the House of Croÿ). When Isabella discovered Franz Ferdinand's locket lying on the tennis court, she opened it, expecting a photo of her daughter. Instead, the locket contained a photo of Sophie. From this, a scandal ensued.

Franz Ferdinand had become heir presumptive to the throne, after the suicide of his cousin Crown Prince Rudolf in 1889 and the death of his father Karl Ludwig of typhoid in 1896. As such his uncle, the Emperor Franz Joseph, informed him that he could not marry Sophie, who could not become an Empress consort. To be an eligible consort for any member of the Imperial House of Habsburg, one needed to belong to one of the reigning or formerly reigning princely dynasties of Europe. Although the Chotek family were noble since at least the 14th century and had been made counts of the Holy Roman Empire in 1745, they were not of dynastic rank (although Sophie was also of royal blood by being a descendant of the Habsburgs, in particular from Matilda of Habsburg, daughter of King Rudolf I of Germany, who was also Franz Ferdinand's ancestor).

Franz Ferdinand refused to renounce Sophie to marry equally and beget an heir to the throne, compounding the scandal surrounding the suicide of Crown Prince Rudolf and his mistress.

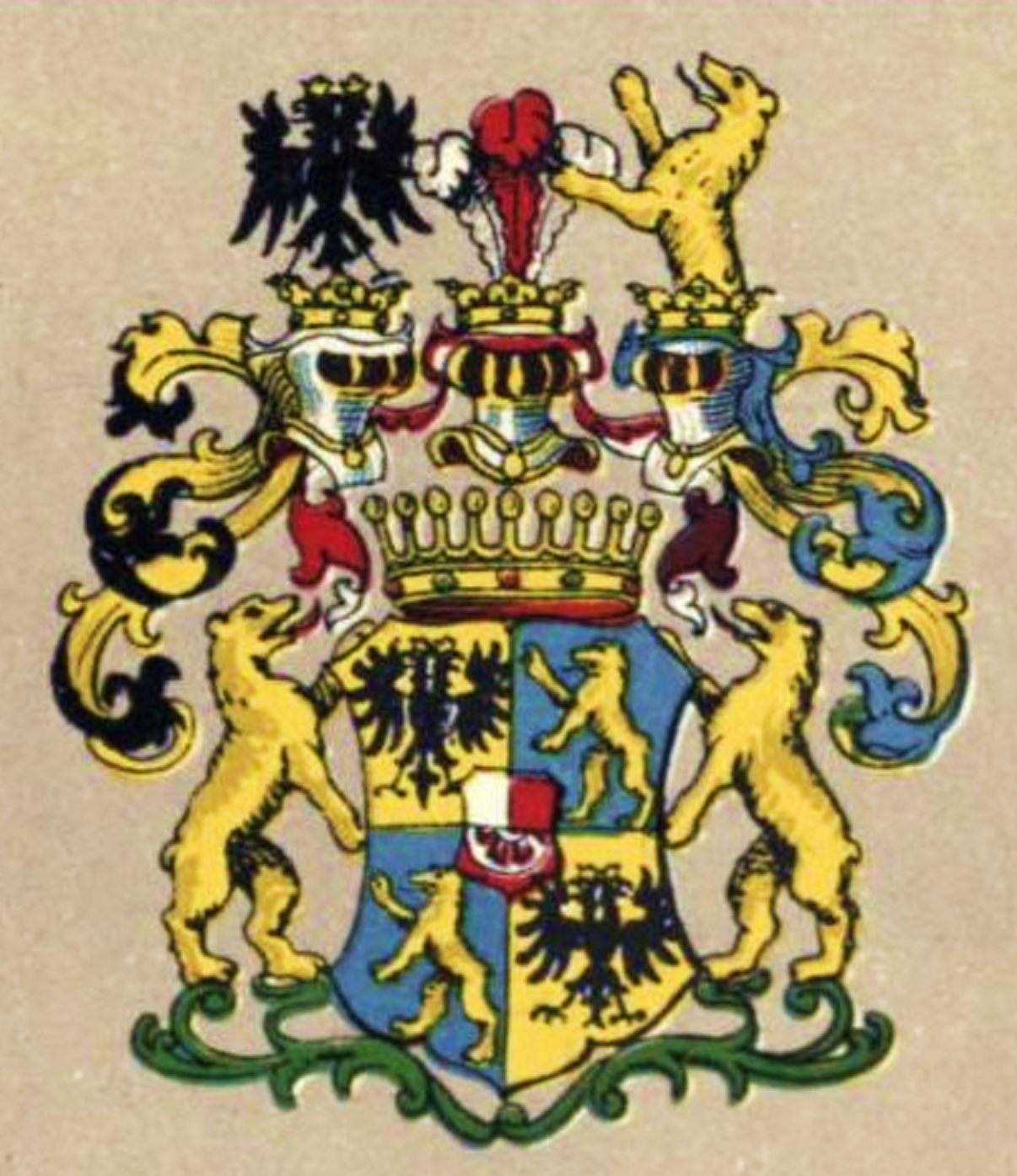
Coat of arms of the Counts Chotek von Chotkow und Wognin

Coat of Arms Kinsky von Wchinitz und Tettau

== Marriage with Franz Ferdinand ==
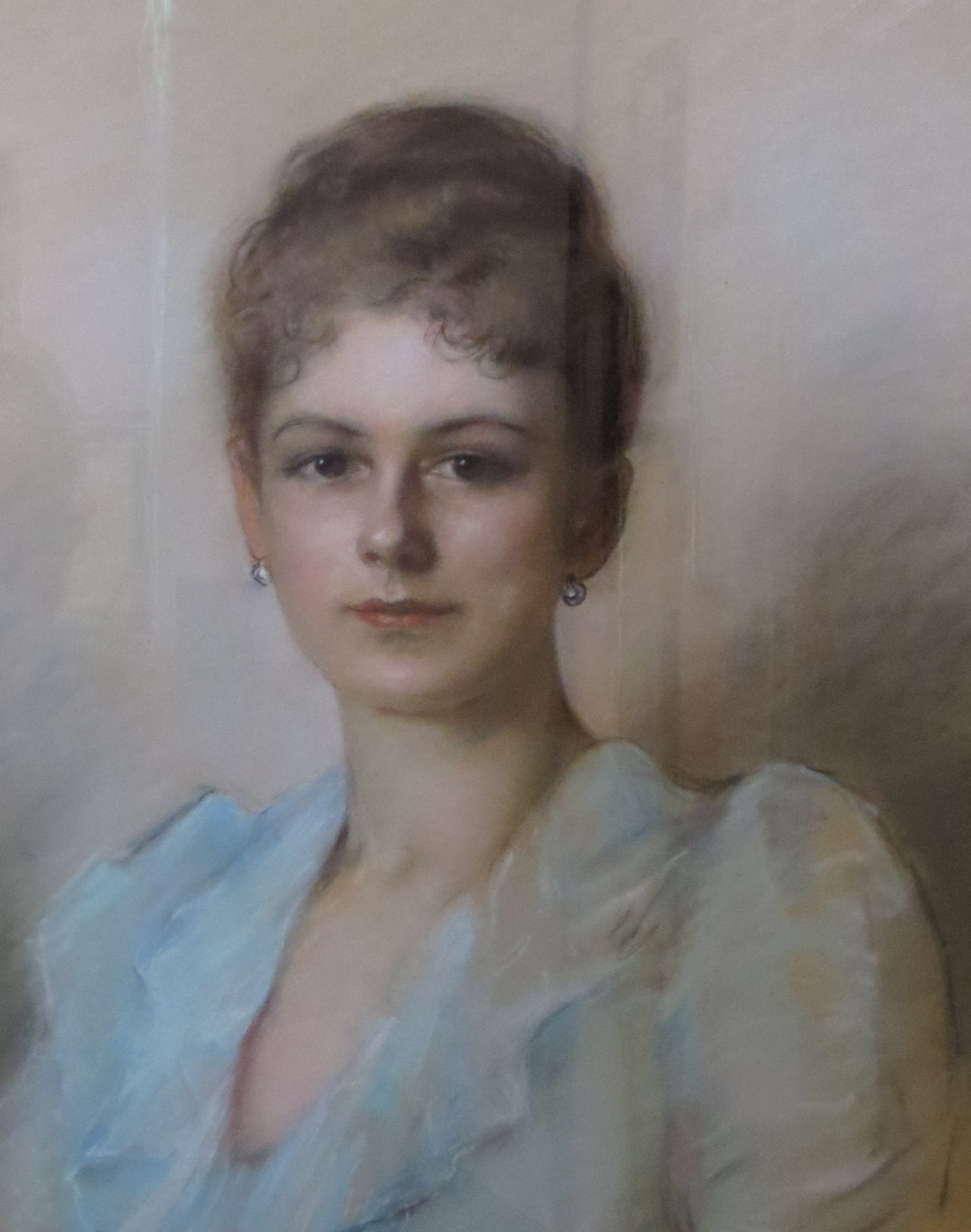
Pre-1910 pastel painting of Sophie, held at Artstetten Castle

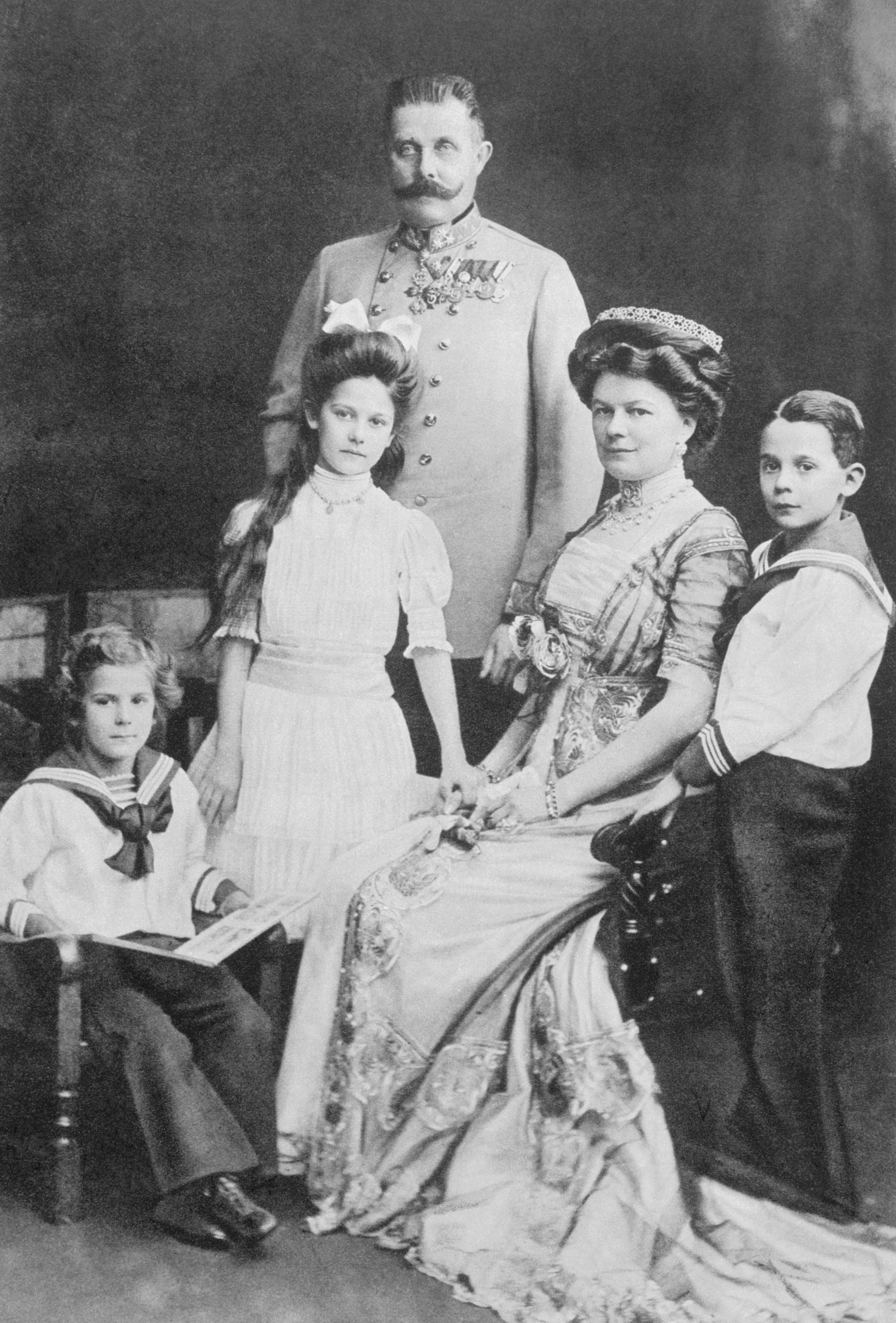
The Duchess with her family

In 1899, under pressure from family members (especially the Archduchess Maria Theresa, the emperor's formidable sister-in-law and Franz Ferdinand's stepmother) the couple were granted permission to wed. Franz Ferdinand was allowed to retain his place in the order of succession and a suitable title was promised for his future wife. However, to prevent Franz Ferdinand from attempting to proclaim his wife empress-queen or declaring their future children dynasts and thus eligible to inherit the crown (especially that of Hungary, where morganatic marriages were unknown to law) once he ascended the throne, he was compelled to appear at the Hofburg Imperial Palace before the gathered archdukes, ministers, and dignitaries of the court, the Cardinal-Archbishop of Vienna and the Primate of Hungary on 28 June 1900 to execute by signature an official instrument in which he publicly declared that Sophie would be his morganatic wife, never to bear the titles of empress, queen or archduchess, and acknowledging that their descendants would neither inherit nor be granted dynastic rights or privileges in any of the Habsburg realms.

Sophie and Franz Ferdinand were married on 1 July 1900 at Reichstadt (now Zákupy) in Bohemia. The Emperor did not attend the nuptials, nor did any of the archdukes, including Franz Ferdinand's brothers. The only members of the Imperial family who were present were Franz Ferdinand's stepmother, Archduchess Maria Theresa, and her two daughters, Maria Annunciata and Elisabeth Amalie.

Upon her marriage, Sophie was given the title Fürstin von Hohenberg ("Princess of Hohenberg") with the style of Durchlaucht ("Serene Highness"). In 1909, she was elevated to Herzogin (Duchess) and accorded the higher style of Hoheit ("Highness").

Nonetheless, all of the archduchesses, mediatized princesses and countesses of Austria and Hungary took precedence before her. For the fourteen years of their marriage, Sophie never shared her husband's rank, title, or precedence. Her position at the Imperial court was humiliating, aggravated by the Imperial Obersthofmeister, Alfred, 2nd Prince of Montenuovo, whose insecurity about his own morganatic background is said to have prompted him to rigorously enforce court protocol at Sophie's expense. Problems of protocol prevented many royal courts from hosting the couple despite Franz Ferdinand's position as heir to the throne. Nonetheless, some did so, including King George V and Queen Mary of the United Kingdom, who warmly welcomed the couple to Windsor Castle from 17 to 21 November 1913. Queen Mary's father, Francis, Duke of Teck, was the offspring of a morganatic marriage and was shunned by royal families in Europe.

The couple had four children:

- Princess Sophie of Hohenberg (1901–1990), married Count Friedrich von Nostitz-Rieneck (1891–1973)
- Maximilian, Duke of Hohenberg (1902–1962), married Countess Elisabeth von Waldburg zu Wolfegg und Waldsee (1904–1993). His descendants married descendants of the Royal Houses of France and Portugal and Austria (Archduke Joseph Arpad).
- Prince Ernst of Hohenberg (1904–1954), married Marie-Therese Wood (1910–1985)
- stillborn son (1908)

== Assassination ==
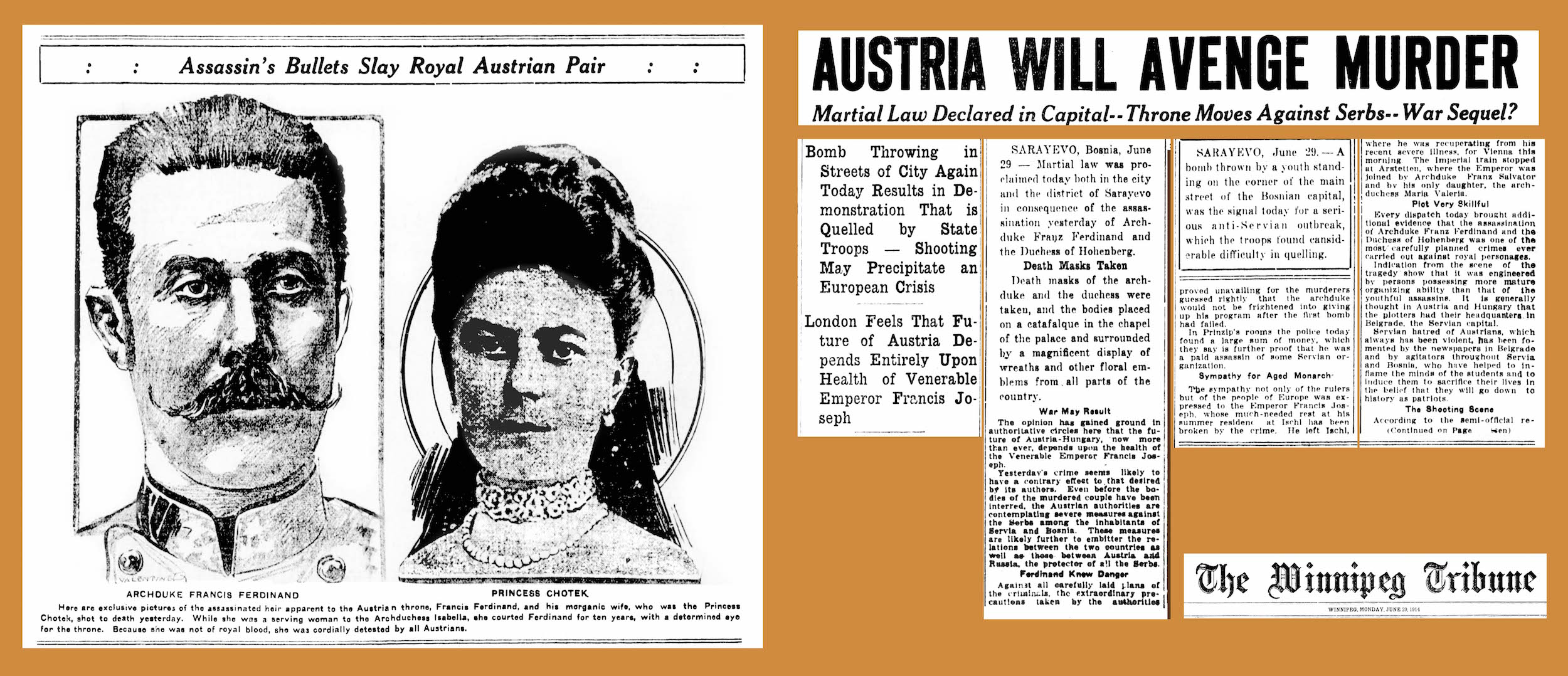
In reports of the assassination, the Duchess was often referred to specifically as the morganic (or morganatic) wife, the caption of the image in this report further asserting that "because she was not of royal blood, she was cordially detested by all Austrians".

In 1914, Archduke Franz Ferdinand was invited by General Oskar Potiorek, Governor of the Austro-Hungarian province of Bosnia and Herzegovina, to watch troops on maneuvers for three days in Sarajevo, the provincial capital. Sophie was not usually allowed to accompany her husband on ceremonial visits because of her lower status, but on this occasion, Franz Ferdinand was invited as a military commander rather than a royal personage. The archduke therefore arranged for Sophie to join him on 28 June, the third and final day, for a troop review followed by a visit to the city to dedicate a new museum before returning to Vienna. The date coincided with the 14th anniversary of their Oath of Renunciation and was a rare opportunity to celebrate in public together, although he knew that the visit would be dangerous.

At 10:10 am of Sunday, 28 June 1914, when the procession passed the Sarajevo central police station, Nedeljko Čabrinović hurled a hand grenade at the archduke's car. The driver accelerated when he saw the object flying towards the car and the grenade exploded under the wheel of the next car. Two of the occupants, Eric von Merizzi and Count Boos-Waldeck, were seriously wounded. Fourteen spectators were hit by bomb splinters.

After attending the official reception at the City Hall, Franz Ferdinand asked about the members of his party that had been wounded by the bomb. When the archduke was told they were badly injured and had been taken to the hospital, he insisted on being taken to see them. A member of the archduke's staff, Andreas, Freiherr von Morsey, suggested this might be dangerous, but General Oskar Potiorek, who was responsible for the safety of the Imperial party, replied, "Do you think Sarajevo is full of assassins?" However, Potiorek did accept it would be better if Sophie remained behind in the city hall. When Freiherr Morsey told Sophie about the revised plans, she refused to stay, arguing: "As long as the Archduke shows himself in public today I will not leave him."

In order to avoid the city centre, Potiorek decided that the Imperial car should travel straight along the Appel Quay to the Sarajevo Hospital. However, Potiorek forgot to tell the driver, Leopold Loyka, about this decision. On the way to the hospital, by the Latin Bridge, the driver took a right turn into Franz Joseph Street. One of the conspirators, Gavrilo Princip, was standing on the corner at the time. Oskar Potiorek immediately realized the driver had taken the wrong route and shouted "What is this? This is the wrong way! We're supposed to take the Appel Quay!"

The driver put his foot on the brake, and began to back up. In doing so he moved slowly past the waiting Gavrilo Princip. The assassin stepped forward, drew his pistol, and at a distance of about five feet, fired twice into the car. Franz Ferdinand was hit in the neck and Sophie in the abdomen. Sophie said to her husband, "For God's sake, what has happened to you?!" She then fell bleeding. Before losing consciousness he pleaded, "Sopherl! Sopherl! Don't die! Stay alive for our children!", using his pet name for the duchess. They were both dead within an hour.

On trial, Gavrilo Princip said that instead of Sophie, he intended to assassinate Oskar Potiorek, but he missed him and hit her. The assassination triggered the July Crisis which led to the First World War.

== Funeral and burial ==
The bodies were transported to Trieste by the battleship SMS Viribus Unitis and then to Vienna by special train for a joint funeral mass in a short ceremony at the Hofburg Palace attended by the immediate imperial family. The Archduke and Duchess were then taken to be entombed side by side as he had requested in the crypt of Artstetten Castle, the Habsburgs' summer home, because burial in the Imperial Crypt was forbidden to Sophie. Today the castle houses a museum in their memory.

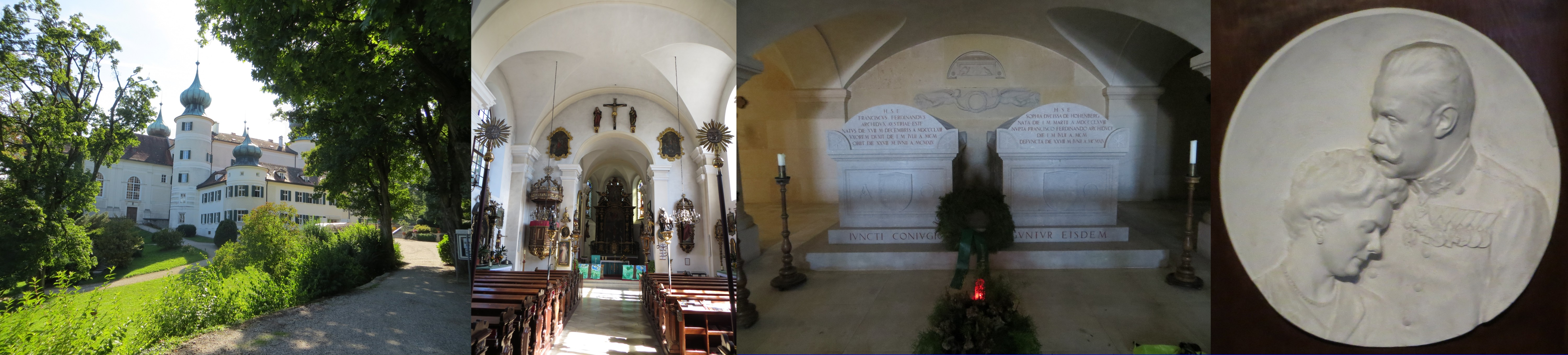
Photo montage (2012) showing Artstetten Castle, its chapel, and the final resting place of the couple, showing each resting at equal heights

=== Commemorative coin ===
Duchess Sophie's castle of Artstetten was selected as a main motif for the 10-euro Castle of Artstetten commemorative coin minted on 13 October 2004. The reverse of the coin shows the entrance to the Hohenberg family crypt, with left-set overlay profile portraits of Sophie and Archduke Franz Ferdinand.

== Titles, styles, honours and arms ==
Arms of Sophie as Duchess of Hohenberg 1909–1914

Arms of Sophie as Princess of Hohenberg 1900–1909

=== Titles and styles ===
- 1 March 1868 – 1 July 1900: Countess Sophie Chotek von Chotkow und Wognin
- 1 July 1900 – 1905: Her Grace The Princess of Hohenberg
- 1905 – 4 October 1909: Her Serene Highness The Princess of Hohenberg
- 4 October 1909 – 28 June 1914: Her Highness The Duchess of Hohenberg

=== Honours ===
- (Austrian Empire) (Kingdom of Hungary) Austria-Hungary:
  - Dame of the Order of the Starry Cross, 1889
  - Grand Cross of the Imperial Austrian Order of Elizabeth, 1913
- Kingdom of Bavaria: Dame of Honour of the Order of Saint Elizabeth
- Holy See: Grand Cross of the Order of the Holy Sepulchre of Jerusalem
- Sovereign Military Order of Malta: Dame of Honour and Devotion

Titles of nobility
New title	Duchess of Hohenberg; 1909–1914	Vacant Title next held by Maximilian
