= Waldburg-Waldsee =

Former county in Baden-Württemberg, Germany

Coordinates: 47°55′N 9°46′E

County of Waldburg-Waldsee Grafschaft Waldburg-Waldsee
- 1667–1806
- Coat of arms
- Status: State of the Holy Roman Empire
- Capital: Bad Waldsee
- Common languages: Alemannic German
- Government: Principality
- Historical era: Middle Ages
  - Partitioned from Waldburg-Wolfegg: 1667
  - Annexed Wolfegg: 1798
  - Raised to principality: 1803
  - Mediatised to Kgdm Württemberg: 1806
Preceded by	Succeeded by
Waldburg-Wolfegg	Kingdom of Württemberg

Waldburg-Waldsee was a County and later Principality within Holy Roman Empire, ruled by the House of Waldburg, located in southeastern Baden-Württemberg, Germany, around Bad Waldsee.

Waldburg-Waldsee was a partition of Waldburg-Wolfegg. When the Wolfegg branch extinguished in 1798, the Waldsee branch inherited Wolfegg. Waldburg-Waldsee was a county prior to 1803, when it was raised to a principality shortly before being mediatised to Württemberg in 1806. The castle of the princes of Waldburg-Waldsee lies in the town of Kißlegg.

== Rulers of Waldburg-Waldsee ==
The Waldburg-Waldsee are one of five branches of the Waldburg family, the others being Waldburg-Waldburg, Walsdburg-Zei, Waldburg-Wolfeck, and Waldburg-Wurzach. By 1872, Waldburg, Wolfeck, and Waldsee merged into a single Waldburg-Waldsee branch. Zeil and Wurzach merged into a second branch.

=== Counts of Waldburg-Waldsee (1667–1803) ===
- John (1667–1724)
- Maximilian (1724–48)
  - Francis Joseph (1724–29)
- Gebhard John (1748–90)
- Joseph Anthony (1790–1803)

=== Prince of Waldburg-Wolfegg-Waldsee (1803–06) ===
- Joseph Anthony (1803–06)

=== Princes of Waldburg-Wolfegg-Waldsee (mediatized) ===
- Joseph Anthony, 1st Prince 1803-1833 (1766-1833)
  - Friedrich, 2nd Prince 1833-1871 (1808-1871)
    - Franz, 3rd Prince 1871-1906 (1833-1906)
      - Maximilian, 4th Prince 1906-1950 (1863-1950)
        - Franz Ludwig, 5th Prince 1950-1989 (1892-1989)
          - Max Willibald, 6th Prince 1989-1998 (1924-1998)
            - Johannes, 7th Prince since 1998 (b.1957)
              - Ludwig, Hereditary Prince of Waldburg-Wolfegg and Waldsee (b.1990)
              - Count Leonardo (b.1995)

== Properties ==
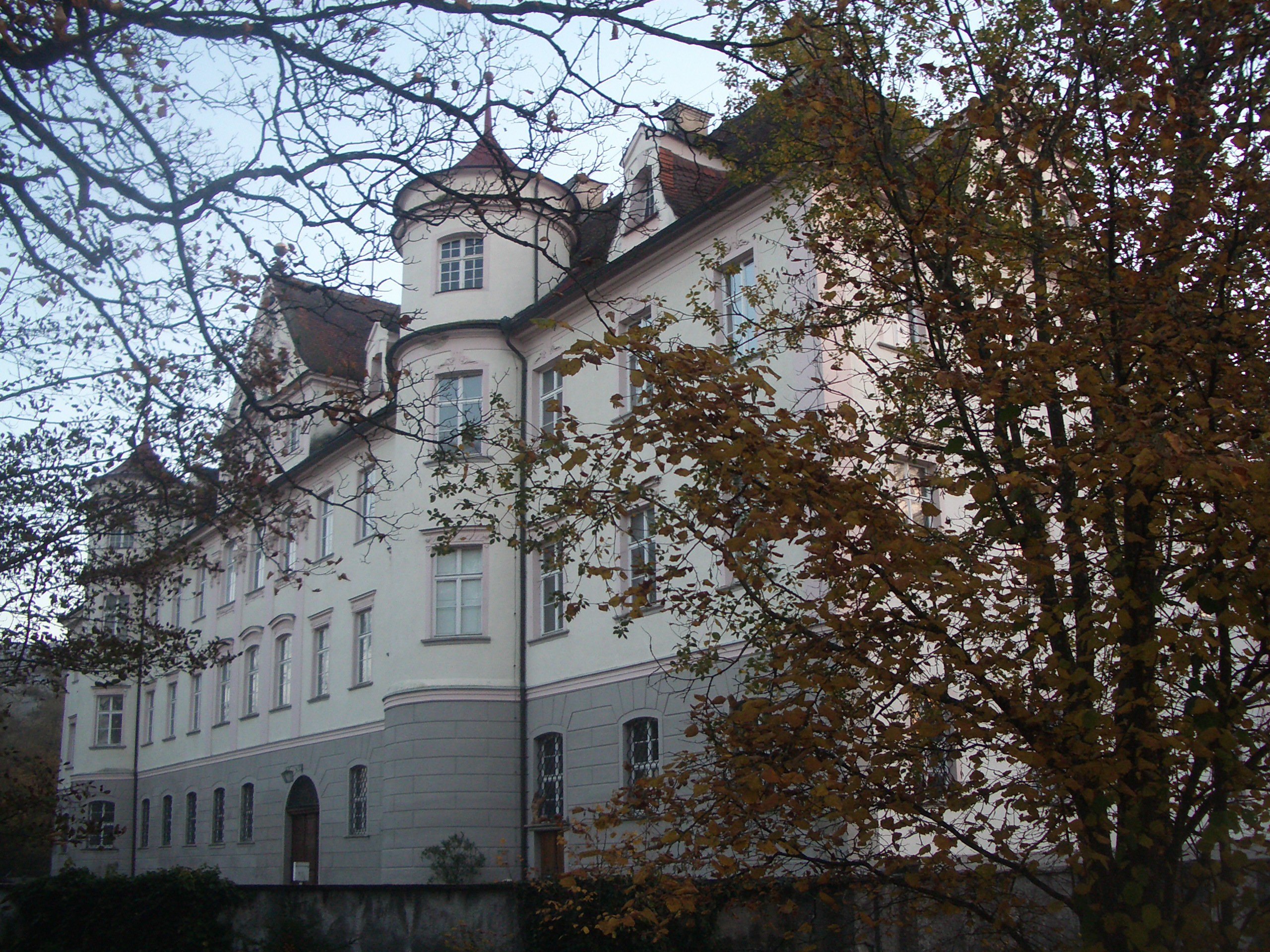
Waldsee Castle

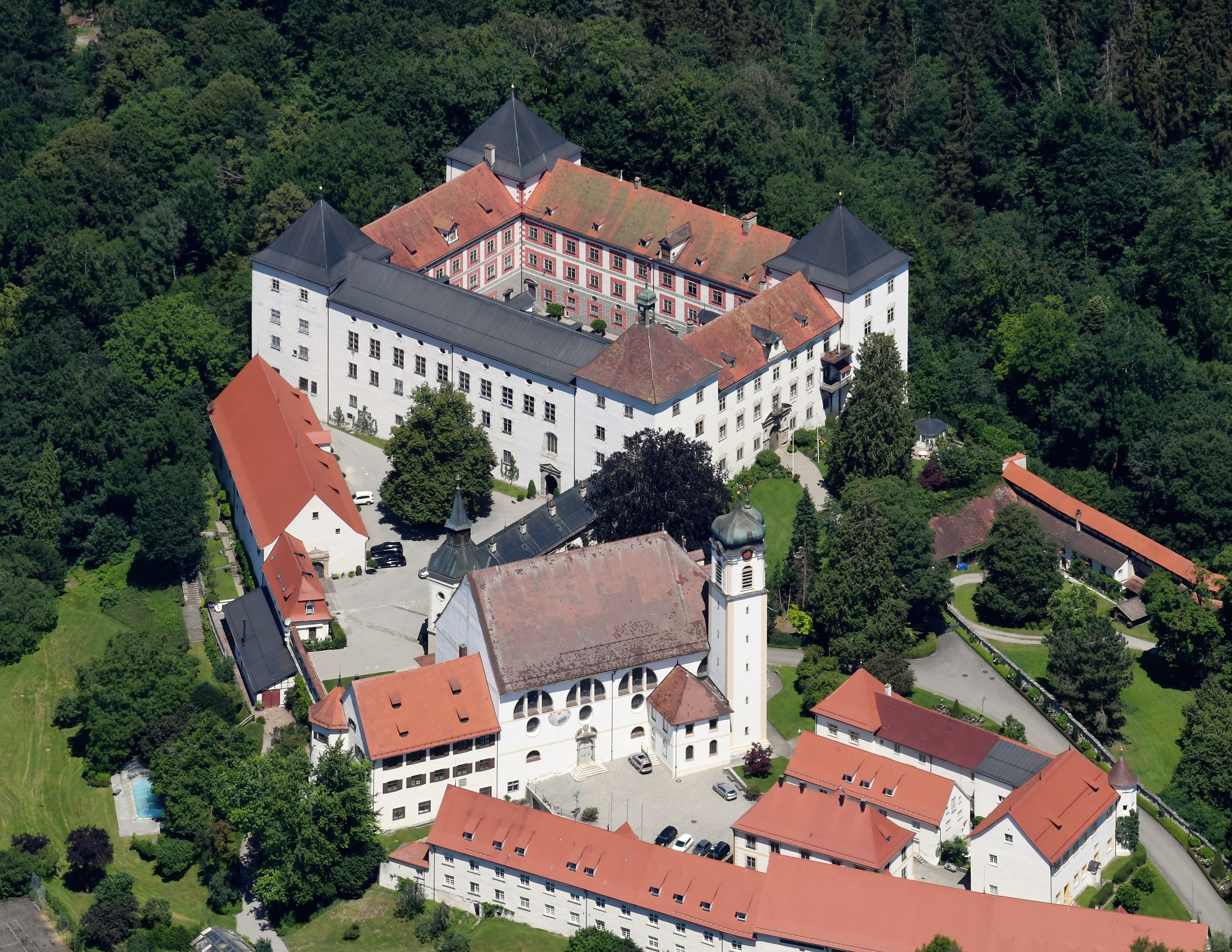
Wolfegg Castle
