= Archduchess Elisabeth Amalie of Austria =

Princess Elisabeth of Liechtenstein (1878–1960)

Archduchess Elisabeth Amalie
- Princess Elisabeth of Liechtenstein
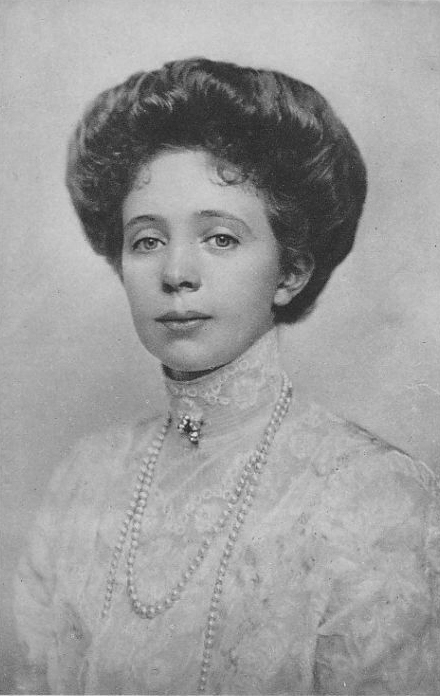
- Elisabeth Amalie in 1909
- Born: 7 July 1878; Reichenau, Austria-Hungary
- Died: 13 March 1960 (aged 81); Vaduz, Liechtenstein
- Burial: St. Florian Cathedral, Vaduz, Liechtenstein
- Spouse: Prince Alois of Liechtenstein (m. 1903; died 1955)
- Issue: Franz Joseph II, Prince of Liechtenstein; Princess Maria Theresia; Prince Karl Alfred; Prince Georg Hartmann; Prince Ulrich Dietmar; Princess Marie Henriette; Prince Alois Heinrich; Prince Heinrich Hartneid
Names
- German: Elisabeth Amalie Eugenia Maria Theresia Karoline Luise Josepha
- House: Habsburg-Lorraine
- Father: Archduke Karl Ludwig of Austria
- Mother: Infanta Maria Theresa of Portugal

Archduchess Elisabeth Amalie of Austria (7 July 1878 – 13 March 1960; German: [eˈliːzabɛt aˈmaːliə] was the daughter of Archduke Karl Ludwig of Austria and his third wife Infanta Maria Theresa of Portugal. Through her son Franz Joseph II, Prince of Liechtenstein, she is the paternal grandmother of the current Hans-Adam II, Prince of Liechtenstein.

== Family and early life ==
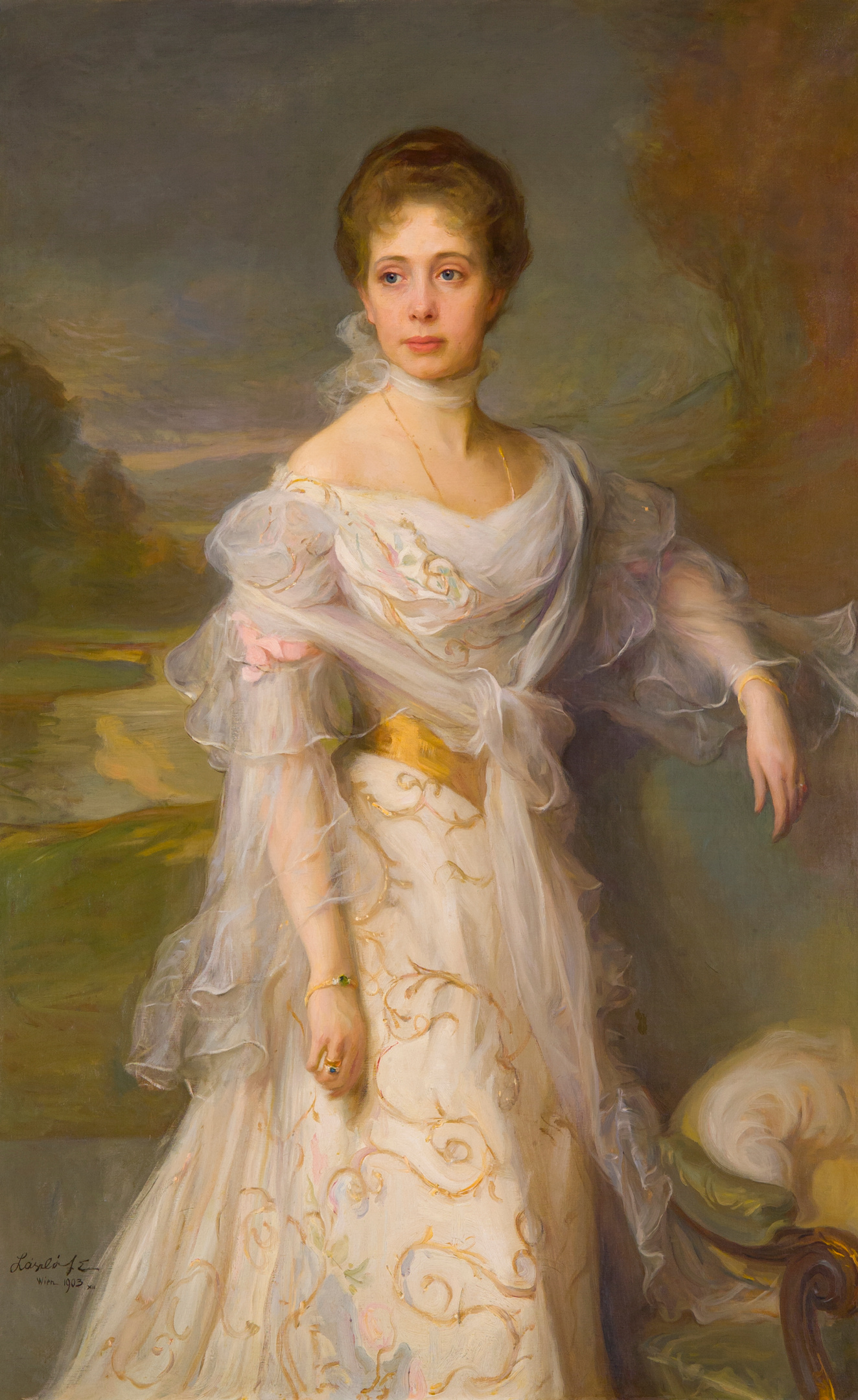
Portrait by Philip de László, 1903

Elisabeth was born in Reichenau on 7 July 1878, the youngest of a large family, as her father Archduke Karl Ludwig of Austria married three times. He had no children with his first wife Princess Margaretha of Saxony, but he and his second wife Princess Maria Annunciata of Bourbon-Two Sicilies welcomed Archduke Franz Ferdinand of Austria, who became heir to the throne of Austria-Hungary; and Archduke Otto Franz Joseph of Austria who was the father of Charles I of Austria, the last Emperor of Austria and two more children.

Elisabeth and her older sister Archduchess Maria Annunciata of Austria (later Abbess of the Theresia Convent in the Hradschin, Prague) were the result of her father's third marriage to her mother Infanta Maria Theresa of Portugal, daughter of the deposed King Miguel I of Portugal. In addition, her father was a younger brother of Franz Joseph I of Austria, the reigning emperor at the time of her birth. He was also a sibling of Maximilian I of Mexico, who became Emperor of Mexico for a short time.

== Marriage ==
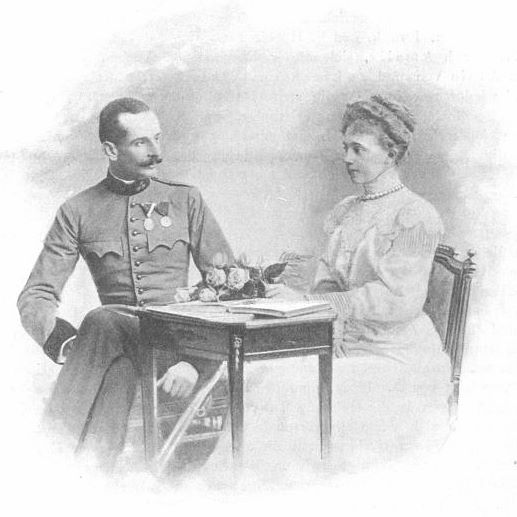
Elisabeth Amalie with her husband Prince Alois of Liechtenstein (Sport & Salon, Vienna, 25 April 1903)

Archduchess Elisabeth Amalie married Prince Alois of Liechtenstein in Vienna on 20 April 1903. There had been some debate as to whether this was an equal union. The bride's uncle Emperor Franz Joseph I attended the wedding with the intention of making it clear he regarded the House of Liechtenstein as a legitimate reigning dynasty. As the House of Liechtenstein had become sovereign, the couple were ruled equal in birth, and the Emperor was happy to see a member of his family making a dynastic marriage, after the morganatic marriage of her half-brother Archduke Franz Ferdinand of Austria. Later, the Emperor also became the godfather of the couple's eldest son, Franz Joseph, who was named after him.

Sometime after their marriage, Princess Catherine Radziwill commented that Elisabeth "is very pretty and resembles her mother more than the Habsburgs, whose lower lip she has not inherited by some kind of miracle, for which, I suppose, she feels immeasurably grateful". Elisabeth and Alois lived in various castles within Austria, including Gross-Ullersdorf Castle. Their eldest son was born in Frauenthal Castle.

The couple had eight children together:

Name	Birth	Death	Notes
Franz Joseph II, Prince of Liechtenstein	16 August 1906	13 November 1989 (aged 83)	married in 1943 Countess Georgina von Wilczek, had issue
Princess Maria Theresia	14 January 1908	30 September 1973 (aged 65)	married in 1944 Count Arthur Strachwitz von Gross-Zauche und Camminetz, had issue
Prince Karl Alfred	16 August 1910	17 November 1985 (aged 75)	married in 1949 Archduchess Agnes Christina of Austria, had issue
Prince Georg Hartmann	11 November 1911	20 January 1998 (aged 86)	married in 1948 Duchess Marie Christine of Württemberg, had issue
Prince Ulrich Dietmar	29 August 1913	13 October 1978 (aged 65)	unmarried and had no issue
Princess Marie Henriette	6 November 1914	13 October 2011 (aged 96)	married in 1943 Count Peter von Eltz genannt Faust von Stromberg, had issue
Prince Alois Heinrich	20 December 1917	14 February 1967 (aged 49)	unmarried and had no issue
Prince Heinrich Hartneid	21 October 1920	29 November 1993 (aged 73)	married in 1968 Countess Amalie von Podstatzky-Lichtenstein, had issue

She owned 31 motor cars and was regarded as one of the more enthusiastic motorists among imperial women in Europe. She converted the stables at her Hungarian castle Stuhlweissenburg to garages but pursued her hobby quietly and studiously, so that the great majority of the public were not even aware of her large collection.

Prince Alois renounced his rights to the succession on 26 February 1923, in favor of their son Franz Joseph, who would accede to the throne on 25 July 1938 as Franz Joseph II. Prince Alois himself died on 17 March 1955 from influenza at Vaduz Castle in Liechtenstein. Due to his renunciation, he never became the prince of Liechtenstein. Elisabeth died on 13 March 1960.

== Ancestry ==
Ancestors of Archduchess Elisabeth Amalie of Austria

8. Francis II, Holy Roman Emperor
4. Archduke Franz Karl of Austria
9. Princess Maria Theresa of Naples and Sicily
2. Archduke Karl Ludwig of Austria
10. Maximilian I Joseph of Bavaria
5. Princess Sophie of Bavaria
11. Princess Caroline of Baden
1. Archduchess Elisabeth Amalie of Austria
12. John VI of Portugal
6. Miguel I of Portugal
13. Infanta Carlota Joaquina of Spain
3. Infanta Maria Theresa of Portugal
14. Constantine, Hereditary Prince of Löwenstein
7. Princess Adelaide of Löwenstein
15. Princess Agnes of Hohenlohe-Langenburg

== See also ==
- Descendants of Miguel I of Portugal

== Sources ==
- Beattie, David (2004). Liechtenstein: A Modern History. I. B. Tauris. ISBN 1-85043-459-X.
- Hilty Ubersetzungen, Schaan (2000). Principality of Liechtenstein: A Documentary Account. Vaduz: Press and Information Office.
- Radziwill, Catherine (1916). The Austrian Court From Within. London: Cassel and Company, LTD. ISBN 1-4021-9370-X.
