= Prince Heinrich of Liechtenstein (1920–1993) =

Liechtensteiner prince

Prince Heinrich
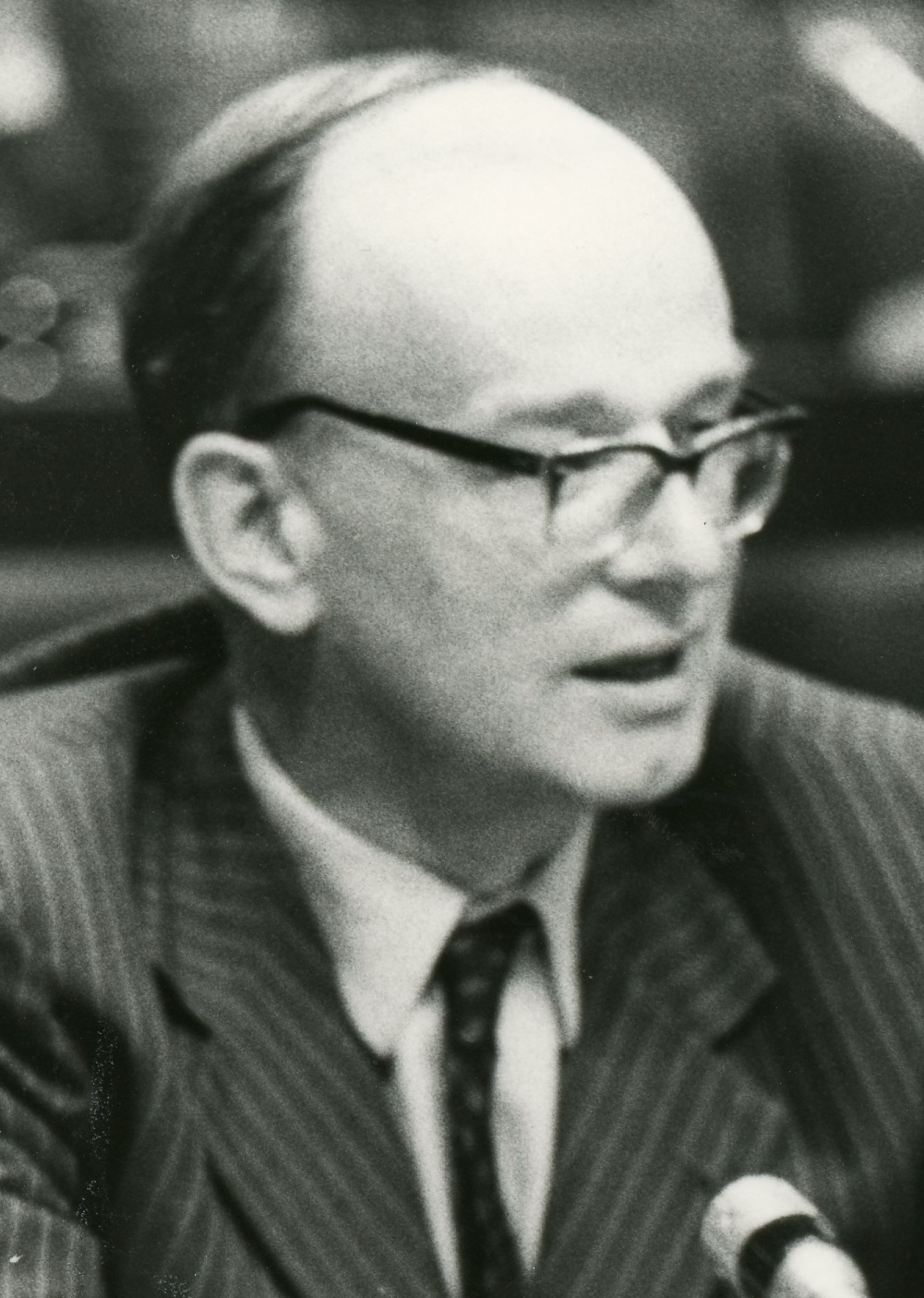
- Prince Heinrich in 1975
- Born: 1 October 1920; Velké Losiny, Czechoslovakia
- Died: 29 November 1993 (aged 73); Grabs, Switzerland
- Burial: St. Florian Cathedral, Vaduz, Liechtenstein
- Spouse: Countess Amalie Podstatzký-Lichtenstein von Prussinowitz (m. 1968)
- Issue: Princess Maria Elisabeth; Prince Hubertus; Princess Marie Therese
Names
- Heinrich Hartneid Maria Franz de Paula Johann Alois Joseph Ignatius Benedictus Hilarion
- House: Liechtenstein
- Father: Prince Alois of Liechtenstein
- Mother: Archduchess Elisabeth Amalie of Austria

Prince Heinrich of Liechtenstein (Heinrich Hartneid Maria Franz de Paula Johann Alois Joseph Ignatius Benedictus Hilarion; 1 October 1920 – 29 November 1993) was a Liechtensteiner prince, diplomat and brother of Franz Joseph II.

== Early life and ancestry ==
Born into the reigning House of Liechtenstein, he was the eighth child and sixth son of Prince Alois of Liechtenstein and his wife, Archduchess Elisabeth Amalie of Austria.

== Career ==
He served as the chargé d'affaires in Switzerland from its reformation in 1944 until 1969, then as the Liechtenstein ambassador to Switzerland from 1969 to 1989. In addition, he was the non-resident ambassador in Austria from 1983 to 1991.

== Personal life ==
He married on 23 April 1968 in Vienna, Countess Amalie Podstatzký-Lichtenstein von Prussinowitz (1935 – 30 March 2025), daughter of Count Leopold Podstatzký-Lichtenstein von Prussinowitz (1903–1979) and Countess Marie Margarete Kinsky von Wchinitz und Tettau (1912–1994). They had three children:

- Princess Maria Elisabeth (b. 30 June 1969, in Bern), married civilly in Vaduz on 21 May and religiously in Blonay on 5 June 2004 Gilles Rouvinez (b. 25 May 1964, in Martigny), without issue
- Prince Hubertus Alois (b. 24 May 1971, in Bern), married to Claudia Rüegg. They have one son:
  - Prince Leopold of Liechtenstein (b. 12 June 2014)
- Princess Marie Therese Eleonore (b. 29 January 1974, in Bern)

== Death ==
Prince Heinrich Hartneid died in Grabs, Switzerland, on 29 November 1993. He is buried in the Princely Crypt in Vaduz Cathedral.

== Ancestry ==
Ancestors of Prince Heinrich of Liechtenstein (1920–1993)

8. Prince Franz de Paula of Liechtenstein
4. Prince Alfred of Liechtenstein
9. Countess Ewa Józefina Julia Potocka
2. Prince Alois of Liechtenstein
10. Alois II, Prince of Liechtenstein
5. Princess Henriette of Liechtenstein
11. Countess Franziska Kinsky of Wchinitz and Tettau
1. Prince Heinrich of Liechtenstein
12. Archduke Franz Karl of Austria
6. Archduke Karl Ludwig of Austria
13. Princess Sophie of Bavaria
3. Archduchess Elisabeth Amalie of Austria
14. Miguel I of Portugal
7. Infanta Maria Theresa of Portugal
15. Princess Adelaide of Löwenstein
