= Archduchess Margarete Sophie of Austria =

Margarete Sophie
- Duchess Albrecht of Württemberg
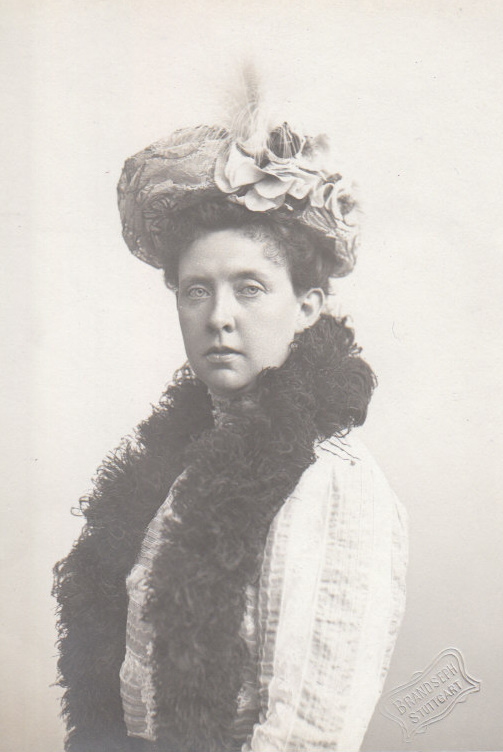
- Photograph, 1901
- Born: 13 May 1870; Artstetten Castle, Artstetten-Pöbring, Austria-Hungary
- Died: 24 August 1902 (aged 32); Gmunden, Austria-Hungary
- Spouse: Duke Albrecht of Württemberg (m. 1893)
- Issue Detail: Philipp Albrecht, Duke of Württemberg; Duke Albrecht Eugen; Duke Carl Alexander; Duchess Maria Amalia; Duchess Maria Theresa; Duchess Maria Elisabeth; Duchess Margarita Maria
Names
- Margarete Sophie Marie Annunciata Theresia Caroline Luise Josephe Johanna
- House: Habsburg-Lorraine
- Father: Archduke Karl Ludwig of Austria
- Mother: Princess Maria Annunziata of Bourbon-Two Sicilies

Archduchess Margarete Sophie of Austria (Margarete Sophie Marie Annunciata Theresia Caroline Luise Josephe Johanna; 13 May 1870 – 24 August 1902) was a member of the House of Habsburg and an Archduchess of Austria by birth. She was married to Duke Albrecht of Württemberg.

== Family ==
Margarete Sophie was born at Artstetten Castle, Artstetten-Pöbring, the fourth and youngest child and only daughter of Archduke Karl Ludwig of Austria and his second wife Princess Maria Annunziata of Bourbon-Two Sicilies. She was named for her father's first wife, Princess Margaretha of Saxony, and for her paternal grandmother, Princess Sophie of Bavaria. Her older brothers included Archduke Franz Ferdinand of Austria and Archduke Otto Franz of Austria.

== Theresan Convent of Noble Ladies ==
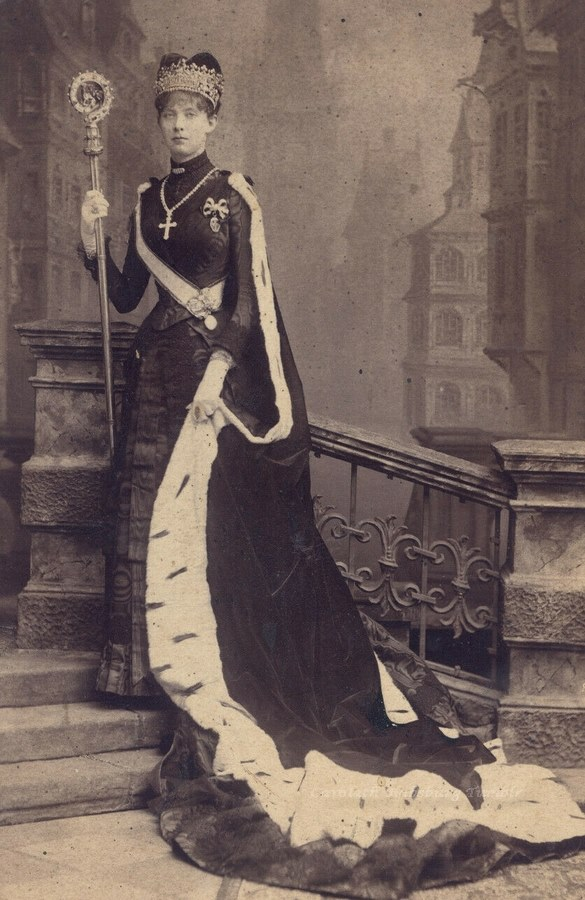
Margaretha as princess-abbess, c. early 1890s

As a young woman, Margarete Sophie was princess-abbess of the Theresian Royal and Imperial Ladies Chapter in Prague (1886-1893). The convent was located in the Hradschin Royal Palace, and was an educational foundation open only to high-born young women, who were required to prove that all sixteen of their great-grandparents were of noble birth. It was not unusual for the abbess to be chosen from among the archduchesses of the Imperial Habsburg family, though the abbess and all pupils were allowed to leave the order and marry.

== Marriage and issue ==
Margarete Sophie married Duke Albrecht of Württemberg, eldest child of Duke Philipp of Württemberg and his wife Archduchess Maria Theresa of Austria, on 24 January 1893 in Vienna, Austria-Hungary. Margarete Sophie and Albrecht had seven children:

- Philipp Albrecht, Duke of Württemberg (1893–1975);
- Duke Albrecht Eugen of Württemberg (born 8 January 1895 in Stuttgart; died 24 June 1954 in Schwäbisch Gmünd), who married Princess Nadezhda of Bulgaria (1899–1958), daughter of Tsar Ferdinand I, and had five children;
- Duke Carl Alexander of Württemberg (born 12 March 1896 in Stuttgart; died 27 December 1964 in Altshausen), known as "Father Odo";
- Duchess Maria Amalia of Württemberg (born 15 August 1897 in Gmunden; died 13 August 1923 in Altshausen), briefly engaged to Crown Prince George of Saxony;
- Duchess Maria Theresa of Württemberg (born 16 August 1898 in Stuttgart; died 26 March 1928 in Eibingen);
- Duchess Maria Elisabeth of Württemberg (born 12 September 1899 in Potsdam; died 15 April 1900 in Meran);
- Duchess Margarita Maria of Württemberg (born 4 January 1902 in Stuttgart; died 22 April 1945 in Altshausen).

Margarete Sophie died of heart failure following complications from surgery, aged 32.

== Gallery ==
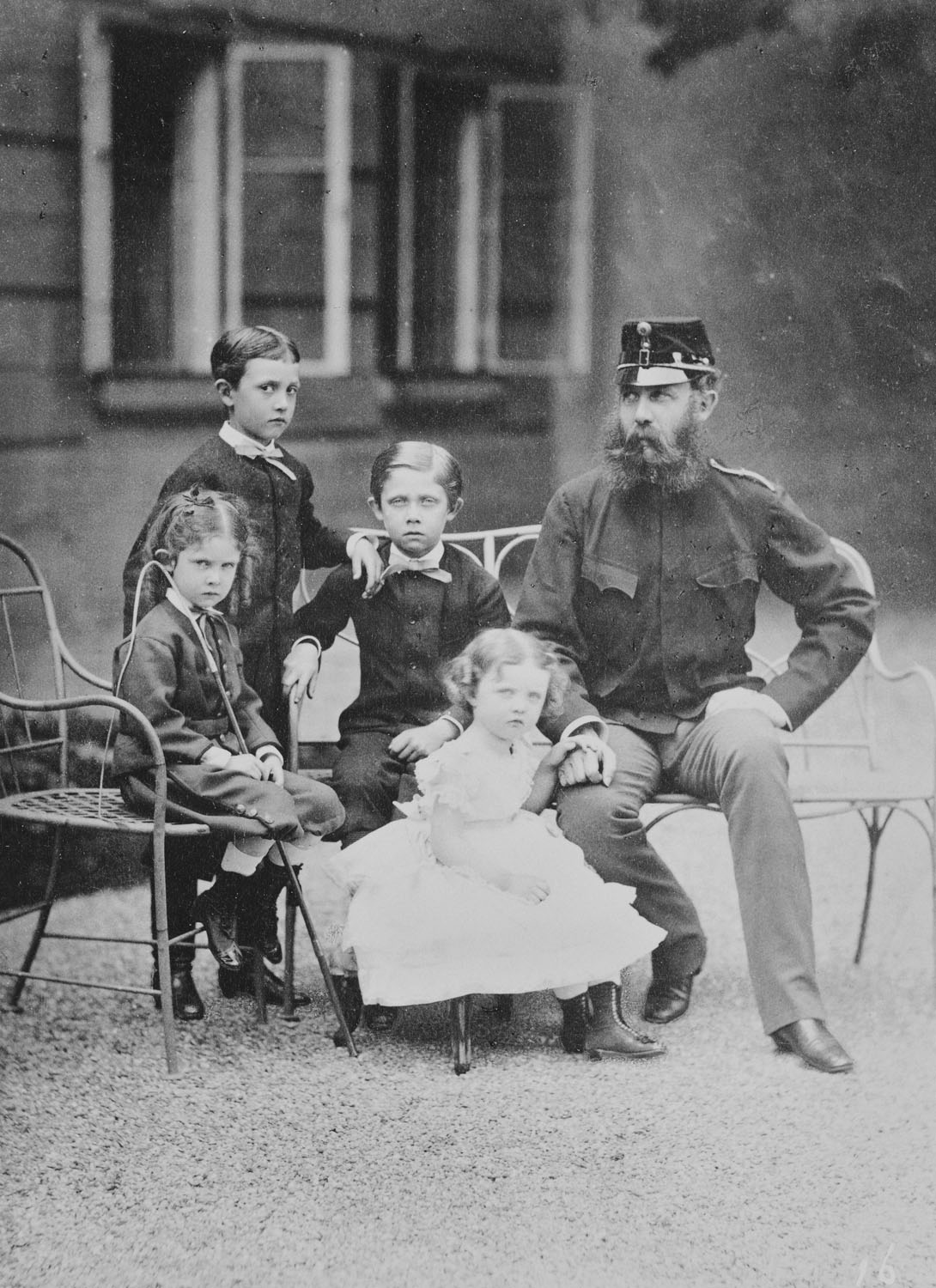
Margarete Sophie with her father and 3 brothers, 1873

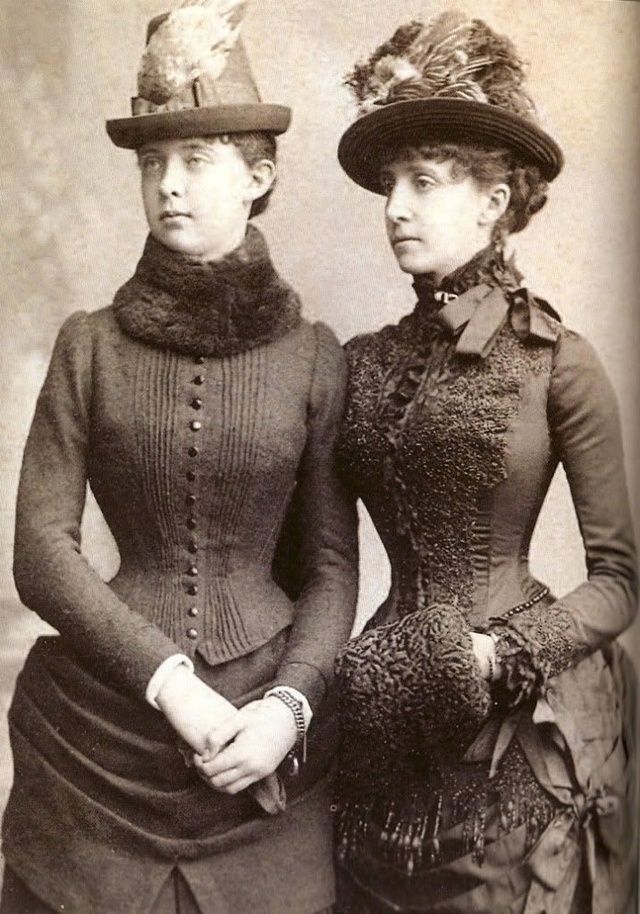
Margarethe Sophie with her stepmother Archduchess Maria Theresa of Austria, 1880s

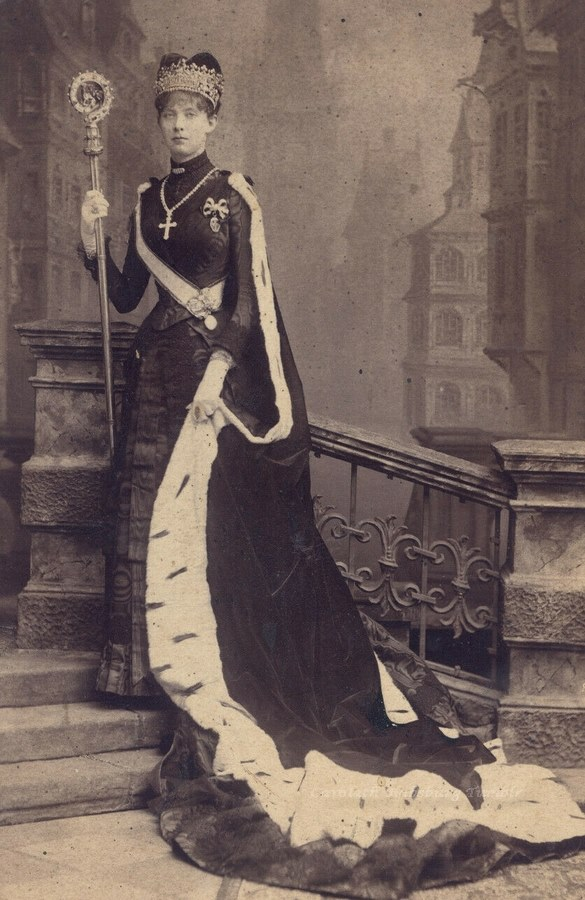
Duchess Margarete Sophie of Württemberg, 1890s

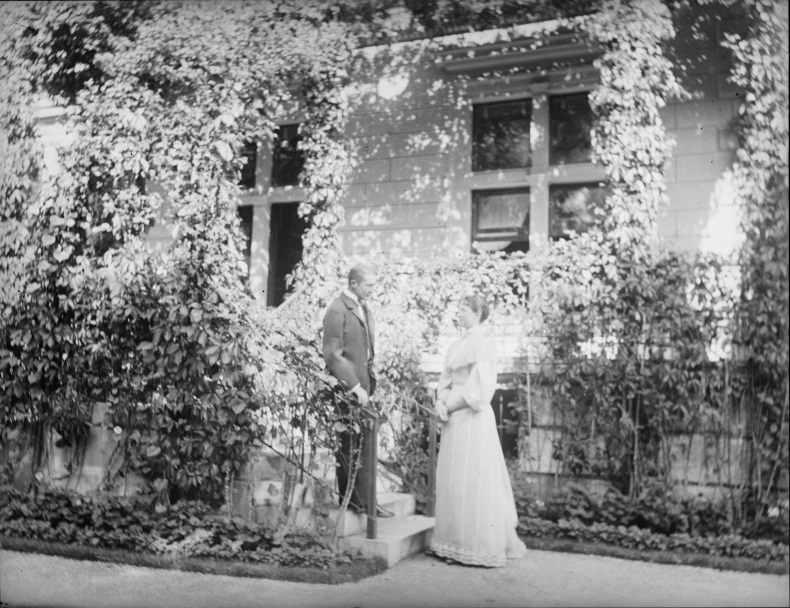
Margarete Sophie with her husband Duke Albrecht of Württemberg, mid 1890s

== Ancestry ==
Ancestors of Archduchess Margarete Sophie of Austria

8. Francis II, Holy Roman Emperor
4. Archduke Franz Karl of Austria
9. Princess Maria Theresa of Naples and Sicily
2. Archduke Karl Ludwig of Austria
10. Maximilian I Joseph of Bavaria
5. Princess Sophie of Bavaria
11. Princess Caroline of Baden
1. Archduchess Margarete Sophie of Austria
12. Francis I of the Two Sicilies
6. Ferdinand II of the Two Sicilies
13. Infanta Maria Isabella of Spain
3. Princess Maria Annunziata of Bourbon-Two Sicilies
14. Archduke Charles, Duke of Teschen
7. Archduchess Maria Theresa of Austria
15. Princess Henrietta of Nassau-Weilburg

== Sources ==
- Finestone, Jeffrey (1983). The Last Courts of Europe. New York: Greenwich House.
