= Princess Maria Annunciata of the Two Sicilies =

Archduchess Karl Ludwig of Austria (1843–1871)

Princess Maria Annunciata
- Archduchess Karl Ludwig of Austria
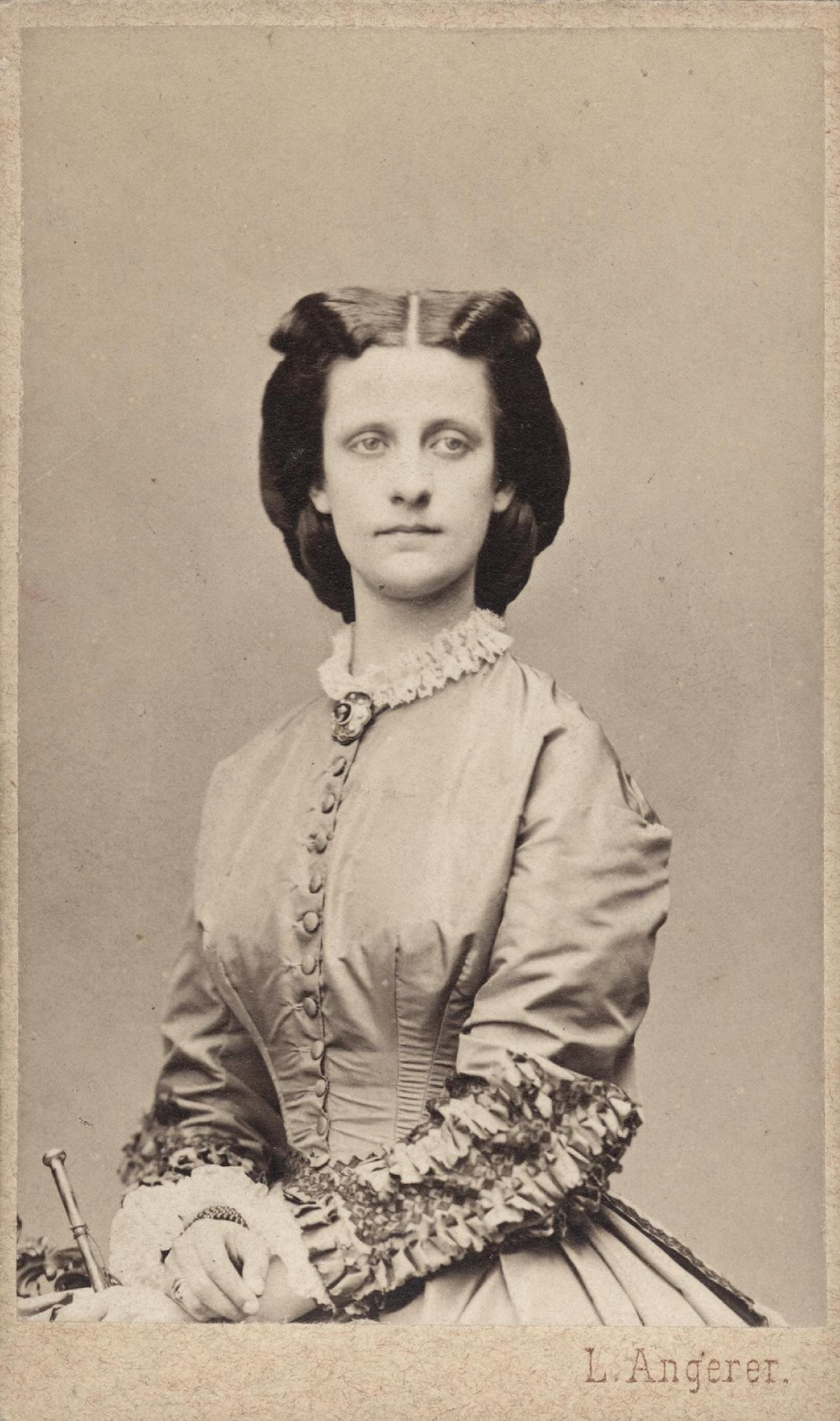
- Photograph c. 1865
- Born: 24 March 1843; Royal Palace of Caserta, Caserta, Two Sicilies
- Died: 4 May 1871 (aged 28); Vienna, Austria-Hungary
- Burial: Imperial Crypt
- Spouse: Archduke Karl Ludwig of Austria (m. 1862)
- Issue: Archduke Franz Ferdinand; Archduke Otto Franz; Archduke Ferdinand Karl; Margarete Sophie, Duchess of Württemberg
Names
- Italian: Maria Annunziata Isabella Filomena Sebasia
- House: Bourbon-Two Sicilies
- Father: Ferdinand II of the Two Sicilies
- Mother: Maria Theresa of Austria

Princess Maria Annunciata Isabella Filomena Sebasia of the Two Sicilies (Italian: Maria Annunziata Isabella Filomena Sebasia, Principessa di Borbone delle Due Sicilie; 24 March 1843 – 4 May 1871) was a political figure from the House of Bourbon-Two Sicilies. In 1862, she married Archduke Karl Ludwig of Austria; however, their marriage was short-lived due to her premature death in 1871. She is known for being the mother of Archduke Franz Ferdinand of Austria, whose assassination in Sarajevo precipitated the start of World War I.

== Early years (1843–1861) ==
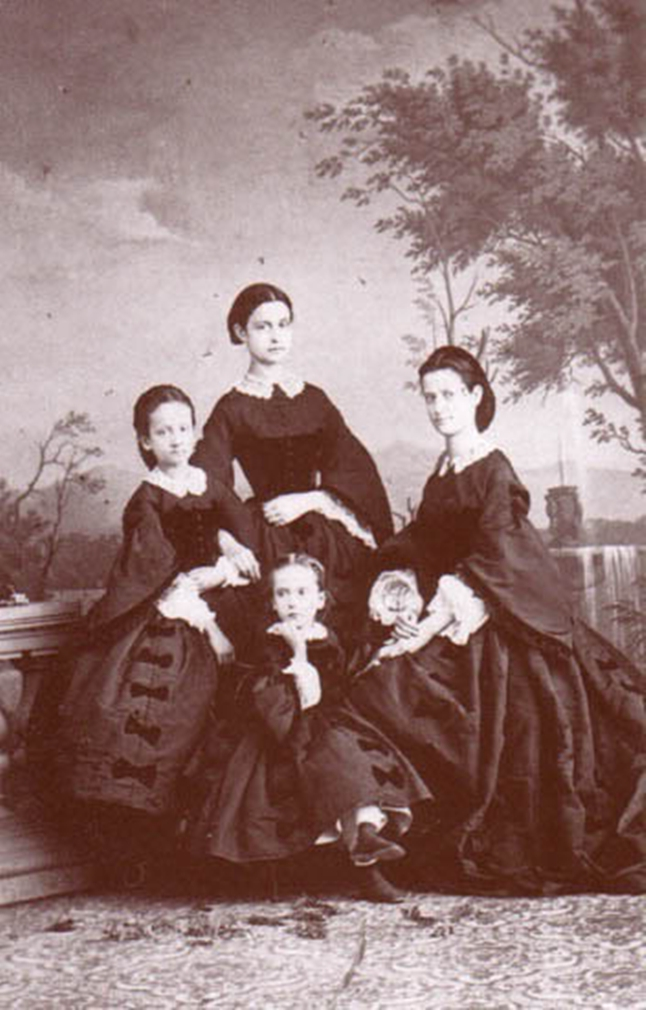
Princess Maria Annunciata (right) photographed with her sisters (clockwise) Maria Immaculata, Maria Pia, and Maria Luisa in 1862

Maria Annunciata Isabella Filomena Sabasia, known as Maria Annunciata to the public and "Ciolla" to her family, was born on 24 March 1843 at the Royal Palace of Caserta to King Ferdinand II of the Two Sicilies and his wife, Archduchess Maria Theresa of Austria. She was the fourth of their twelve children, and the eldest daughter. She also had a half-brother, Francis, from her father's first marriage. Throughout her childhood and adulthood, Maria was known to be "calm, modest and reserved", while her mother enjoyed social life.

=== Death of Ferdinand ===
In 1859, Ferdinand, Maria's father, died, and her older brother Francis became king of the Kingdom of the Two Sicilies. His reign ended in 1860 during the Expedition of the Thousand led by Giuseppe Garibaldi, who overthrew the monarchy, and the people voted to join the Kingdom of Sardinia, under King Victor Emmanuel II of Sardinia.

Upon the invasion, Maria Theresa moved the family towards Gaeta. The family stayed in Rome after many weeks of traveling. There the family lived with Pope Pius IX at the Quirinal Palace. Then the family left for the Farnese Palace.

== Marriage (1862–1870) ==
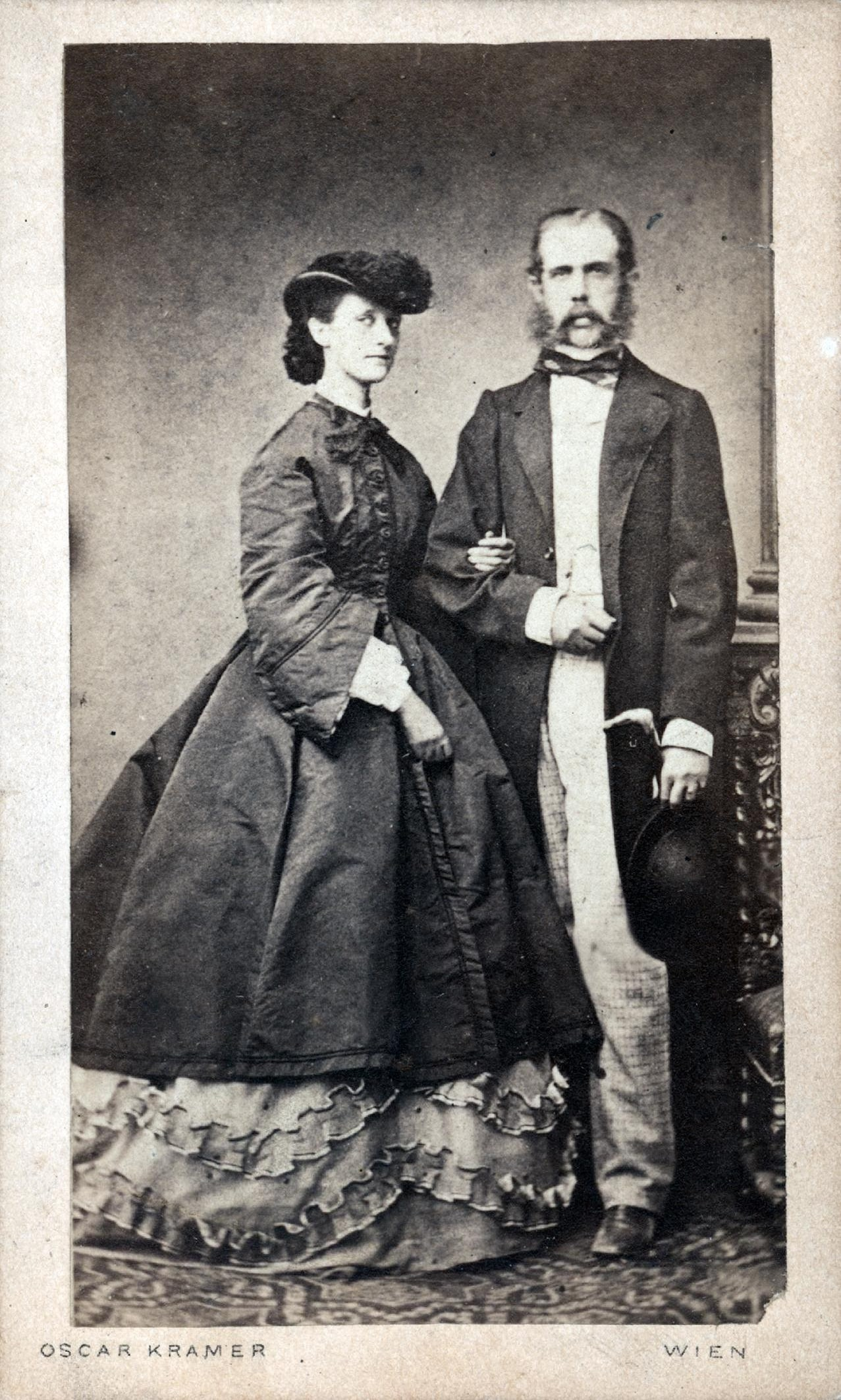
Archduchess Maria Annunciata with her husband Karl Ludwig photographed in c. 1869

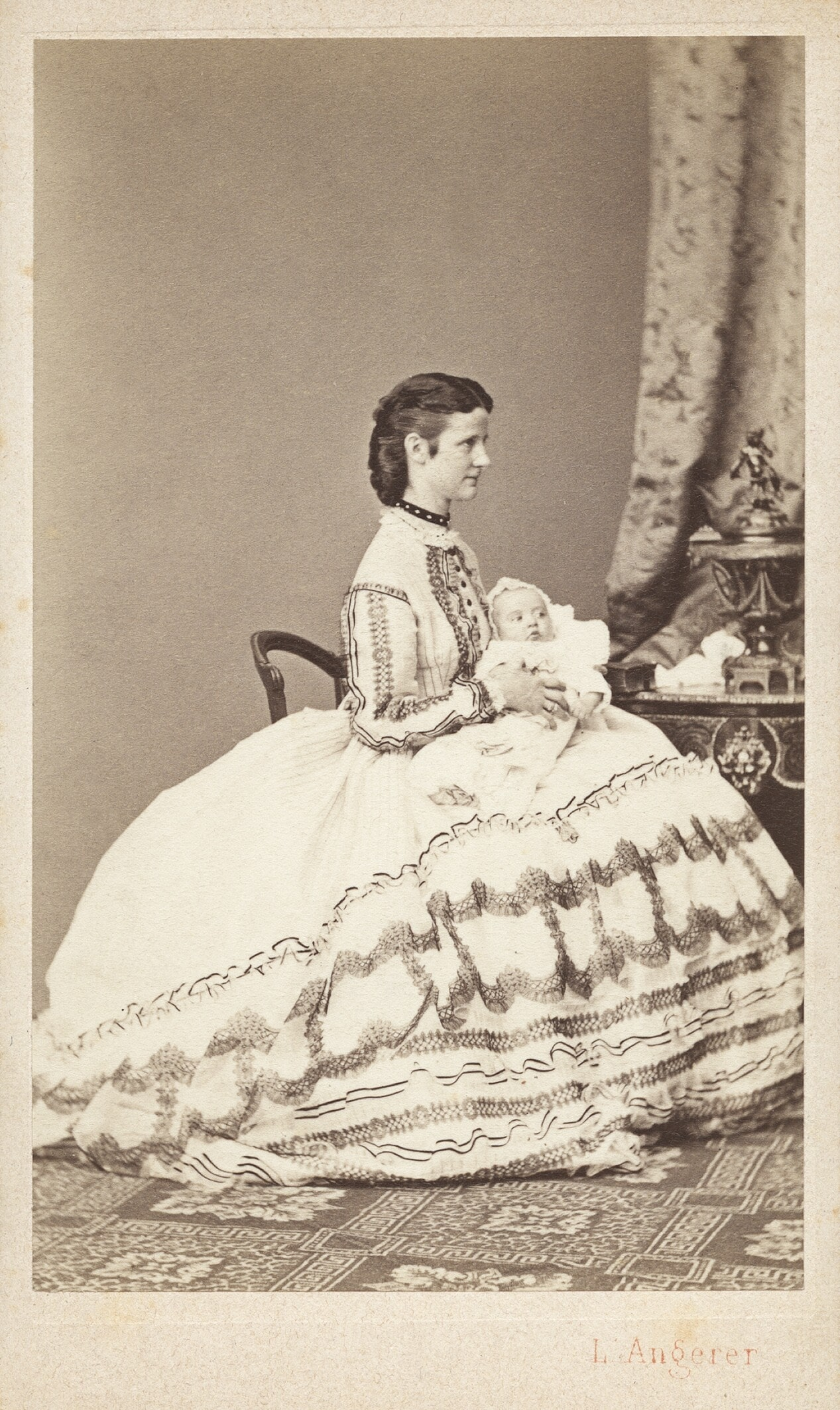
Archduchess Maria Annunciata sitting with her second son Archduke Otto Franz in c. 1865

During the family's stay in Rome, Maria was wedded to Archduke Karl Ludwig of Austria. The marriage by proxy took place on 16 October 1862 in Rome, and the wedding itself took place on 21 October 1862 in Venice. It was reported that the couple fell in love instantly upon seeing each other for the first time, though there is nothing to back up this claim. The marriage itself appeared to be a happy one. One day after the wedding, however, Maria suffered from a seizure during mass. This in return caused many to worry over the Princess's health, and the fact the seizure had taken place in front of members of the reigning House of Habsburg. Later on it was revealed Maria was afflicted with tuberculosis.

Maria suppressed her illness and attended balls, theater and opera.

=== Children ===
Despite Maria's poor health, she gave birth to four children: Franz Ferdinand in 1863, Otto Franz in 1865, Ferdinand Karl in 1868, and Margarete Sophie in 1870.

== Death and burial ==
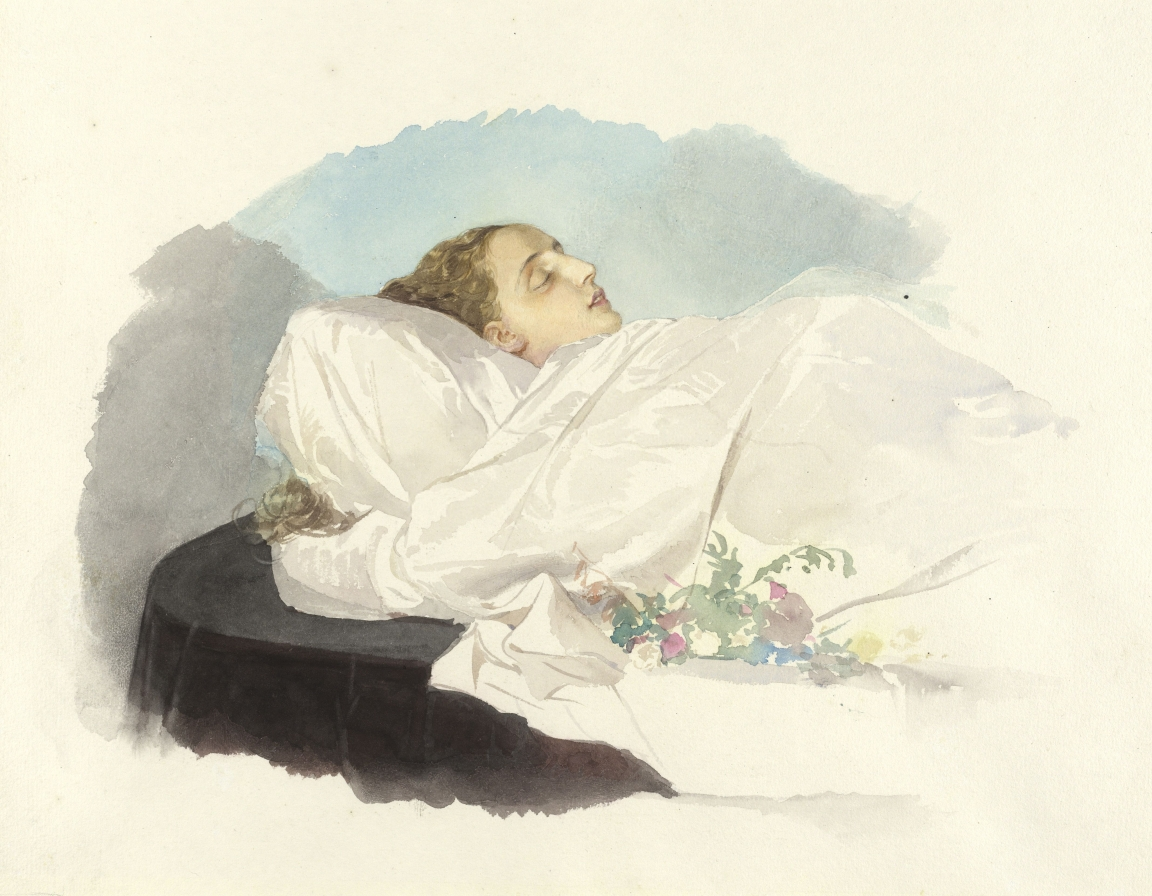
Deathbed portrait of Archduchess Maria Annunciata, 1871

After the birth of Margarete Sophie in 1870, Maria became very ill; it was evident that she would not survive, much to the public's dismay. As her illness progressed, Maria spent her final days in agony, succumbing to tuberculosis on 4 May 1871 at the age of 28. Her burial took place in the Imperial Crypt at the Capuchin Church in Vienna, Austria.

Her husband, Archduke Karl Ludwig, remarried two years after her death in 1873 to Infanta Maria Theresa of Portugal. They named their first child, Maria Annunziata, after her.

== Children ==
Children of Princess Maria Annunziata

Name	Portrait	Lifespan	Notes
Archduke Franz Ferdinand		18 December 1863 – 28 June 1914	Married morganatically Countess Sophie Chotek von Chotkow und Wognin; had issue
Archduke Otto Franz Joseph Karl Ludwig Maria; Archduke Otto of Austria		21 April 1865 – 1 November 1906	Married Maria Josepha of Saxony; had issue. He had an affair with actress Maria Schlenizer; had issue.
Archduke Ferdinand Karl; Ferdinand Burg		27 December 1868 – 12 March 1915	Married morganatically to Bertha Czuber; no issue
Archduchess Margarete Sophie		13 May 1870 – 24 August 1902	Married Albrecht, Duke of Württemberg; had issue

== Ancestry ==
Ancestors of Princess Maria Annunciata of the Two Sicilies

8. Ferdinand I of the Two Sicilies
4. Francis I of the Two Sicilies
9. Archduchess Maria Carolina of Austria
2. Ferdinand II of the Two Sicilies
10. Charles IV of Spain
5. Infanta María Isabella of Spain
11. Princess Maria Luisa of Parma
1. Princess Maria Annunziata of Bourbon-Two Sicilies
12. Leopold II, Holy Roman Emperor
6. Archduke Charles, Duke of Teschen
13. Infanta Maria Louisa of Spain
3. Archduchess Maria Theresa of Austria
14. Frederick William, Prince of Nassau-Weilburg
7. Princess Henrietta of Nassau-Weilburg
15. Burgravine Louise Isabelle of Kirchberg

== Bibliography ==
- Acton, Harold (1961). The Last Bourbons of Naples (1825-1861). Methuen. ISBN 978-0413241504.
- Hamann, Brigitte (1988). The Habsburgs: A Biographical Dictionary. Ueberreuter. ISBN 978-3800032471.
- Wheatcroft, Andrew (1995). The Habsburgs: Embodying Empire. Viking. ISBN 978-0670854905.
- Weissensteiner, Friedrich (1983). Franz Ferdinand: Der verhinderte Herrscher. Österr. Bundesverl. ISBN 3-215-04828-0.
