= Margaret of Saxony =

Margaret of Saxony may refer to:

- Margaret of Saxony (d. 1429), wife of Bernard I, Duke of Brunswick-Lüneburg
- Margaret of Austria, Electress of Saxony (1416–1486), wife of Frederick II, Elector of Saxony
- Margaret of Saxony (1444–1498), daughter of Frederick II, Elector of Saxony and became the Abbess of Seusslitz
- Margaret of Thuringia (Margaret of Saxony; 1449–1501), daughter of William III, Landgrave of Thuringia and wife of John Cicero, Elector of Brandenburg
- Margaret of Saxony, Duchess of Brunswick-Lüneburg (1469–1528), daughter of Ernest, Elector of Saxony and wife of Henry I of Lüneburg
- Princess Margaretha of Saxony (1840–1858), daughter of John of Saxony and wife of Archduke Karl Ludwig of Austria
- Princess Margarete Karola of Saxony (1900–1962), daughter of Frederick Augustus III of Saxony and wife of Frederick, Prince of Hohenzollern
