= Archduke Otto of Austria =

Archduke Otto of Austria can refer to the following members of the Austrian Royal or Imperial family:

- Archduke Otto Franz Joseph of Austria (1865–1906), father of Karl, the last Emperor of Austria
- Otto von Habsburg (1912–2011), the last crown prince of Austria-Hungary, son of Karl
