= Otto of Austria =

Otto of Austria may refer to:

- Otto, Duke of Austria (1301–1339), youngest son of Albert I of Germany
- Archduke Otto of Austria (1865–1906), brother of Francis Ferdinand and nephew of Emperor Francis Joseph
- Otto von Habsburg (1912–2011), aka Otto, Archduke of Austria, grandson of previous
