= Princess Nadezhda of Bulgaria =

Princess Nadezhda
- Duchess Albrecht Eugen of Württemberg
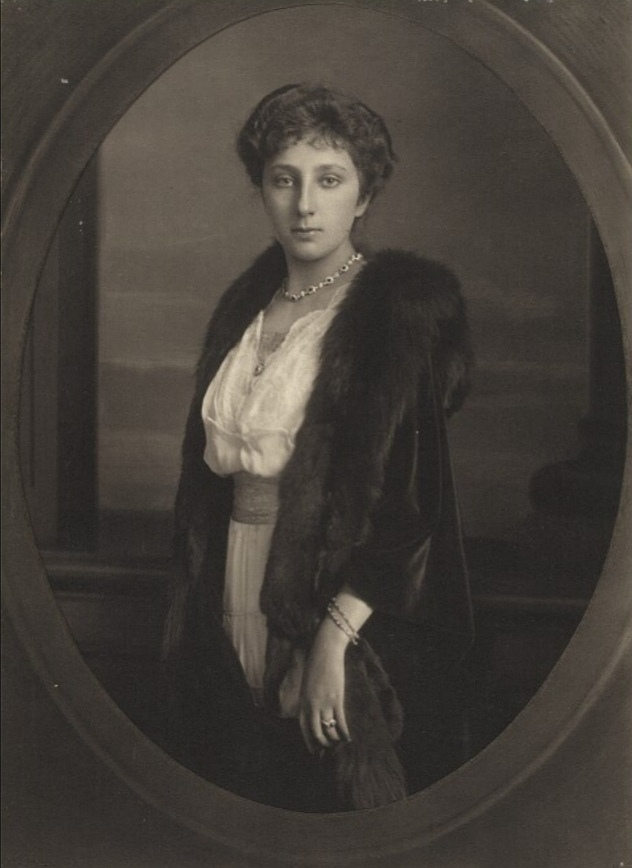
- Photograph, c. 1917
- Born: 30 January 1899; Sofia, Principality of Bulgaria
- Died: 15 February 1958 (aged 59); Stuttgart, West Germany
- Burial: Altshausen Castle
- Spouse: Duke Albrecht Eugen of Württemberg (m. 1924; died 1954)
- Issue: Duke Ferdinand Eugen; Duchess Margareta Luise; Duke Eugen Eberhard; Duke Alexander Eugen; Duchess Sophie
Names
- Nadezhda Klementine Maria Pia Majella
- House: Saxe-Coburg and Gotha
- Father: Ferdinand I of Bulgaria
- Mother: Princess Marie Louise of Bourbon-Parma

Princess Nadezhda of Bulgaria (Bulgarian: Княгиня Надежда; 30 January 1899 – 15 February 1958) was a member of the House of Saxe-Coburg and Gotha-Koháry by birth and was a member of House of Württemberg through her marriage.

== Early life ==
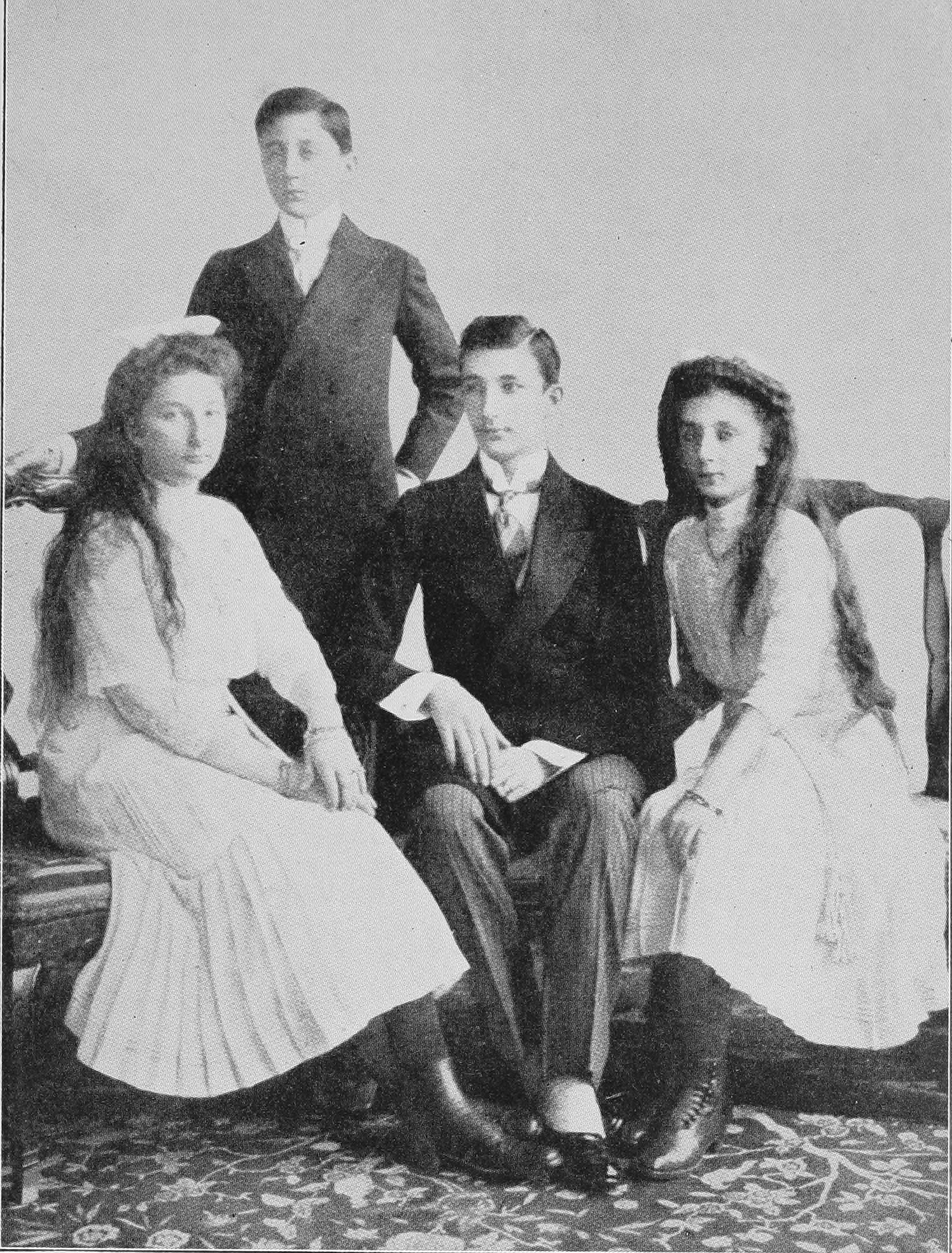
Nadezhda with her siblings, circa 1911.

Princess Nadezhda was born on 30 January 1899 in Sofia, the younger daughter of Ferdinand I of Bulgaria and his first wife, Princess Marie Louise of Bourbon-Parma, who died due to complications immediately following her birth.Alongside her elder sister, Princess Eudoxia, her domestic upbringing and education were overseen by her stepmother, Tsaritsa Eleonore Reuss of Köstritz, focusing primarily on modern languages and history. Her name, Nadezhda, means "Hope".

To commemorate her birth, a newly established railway settlement and village located on the northern outskirts of Sofia was formally named the Village of Nadezhda in 1905 under an imperial directive, which subsequently developed into the modern Nadezhda District of the Bulgarian capital. Following the defeat of Bulgaria in World War I and her father's abdication in October 1918, she left the country to reside with her family in Coburg, Germany.

== Marriage and subsequent life ==
On 24 January 1924, Princess Nadezhda married Duke Albrecht Eugen of Württemberg at Bad Mergentheim, Germany. He was the second son of Albrecht, Duke of Württemberg and Archduchess Margarete Sophie of Austria. Princess Nadezhda consistently remained distanced from public political affairs throughout her life, focusing her decades entirely on domestic family management and local parochial charities.

The marriage produced five children:

- Duke Ferdinand Eugen of Württemberg (1925–2020).
- Duchess Margareta Luise of Württemberg (1928–2017), married François Luce-Bailly, Viscount of Chevigny in 1970 and had issue (including Patrick de La Lanne-Mirrlees, former mayor of Delmenhorst, Germany, by Robin de La Lanne-Mirrlees).
- Duke Eugen Eberhard of Württemberg (1930–2022), married Archduchess Alexandra of Austria in 1962 and divorced in 1972 and without issue.
- Duke Alexander Eugen of Württemberg (1933–2024).
- Duchess Sophie of Württemberg (born 1937), married Antonio Manuel Rôxo de Ramos-Bandeira in 1969 and divorced in 1974 and without additional issue.

Princess Nadezhda died at the age of 59 on 15 February 1958 in Stuttgart, West Germany, and her remains were interred within the royal crypt at Schloss Altshausen.

== Arms ==
Coat of arms of Princess Nadezhda of Bulgaria

== Ancestors ==
Ancestors of Princess Nadezhda of Bulgaria

8. Prince Ferdinand of Saxe-Coburg and Gotha
4. Prince August of Saxe-Coburg and Gotha
9. Princess Maria Antonia Koháry of Csábrág and Szitnya
2. Ferdinand I of Bulgaria
10. Louis Philippe I of France
5. Princess Clémentine of Orléans
11. Princess Maria Amalia of Naples and Sicily
1. Princess Nadezhda of Bulgaria
12. Charles III, Duke of Parma
6. Robert I, Duke of Parma
13. Princess Louise d'Artois
3. Princess Marie Louise of Bourbon-Parma
14. Ferdinand II of the Two Sicilies
7. Princess Maria Pia of Bourbon-Two Sicilies
15. Archduchess Maria Theresa of Austria
