= Archduke Ferdinand Karl of Austria =

Austrian archduke (1868–1915)

Ferdinand Karl
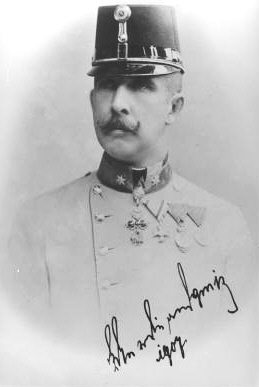
- Ferdinand Karl in 1901
- Born: 27 December 1868; Vienna, Austria-Hungary
- Died: 12 March 1915 (aged 46); Munich, German Empire
- Spouse: Bertha Czuber
- Father: Archduke Karl Ludwig of Austria
- Mother: Princess Maria Annunciata of Bourbon-Two Sicilies

Archduke Ferdinand Karl of Austria, later known as Ferdinand Burg (Ferdinand Carl Ludwig Joseph Johann Maria; Vienna, 27 December 1868 – Munich, 12 March 1915) was a member of the House of Habsburg-Lorraine.

== Biography ==
Ferdinand Karl was the third son of Archduke Charles Louis of Austria and Princess Maria Annunciata of Bourbon-Two Sicilies. Archduke Franz Ferdinand, whose assassination at Sarajevo on 28 June 1914 launched World War I, was his elder brother.

He served as a major-general in the Austro-Hungarian Army.

== Marriage ==
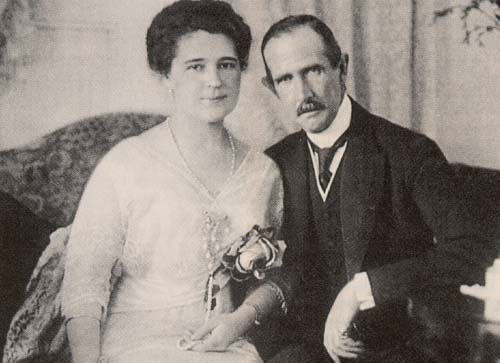
Ferdinand Karl and his wife Bertha Czuber (1910)

Like his brother, in 1909; he concluded an unequal marriage with Bertha Czuber (1879–1979), daughter of Emanuel Czuber. Unlike his brother, he did so without the emperor's knowledge or consent, having eloped two years before the marriage was revealed publicly.

On 6 August 1911, he renounced his rights and titles as a dynast of the House of Habsburg and assumed the name of "Ferdinand Burg", at the demand of Emperor Franz Joseph. Henceforth, he absented himself from the Viennese court and lived in Tyrol.

== Death ==
By then Ferdinand Karl was suffering from tuberculosis, of which he died in 1915. He and his wife had no children. A funeral was set for him about four months after his death.

== Honours ==
He received the following orders and decorations:

- Austria-Hungary:
  - Knight of the Golden Fleece, 1884
  - Military Merit Cross
  - Military Merit Medal on red ribbon
  - Long Service Cross for Officers, 2nd Class
  - Bronze Jubilee Medal for the Armed Forces
- (Tuscany) Tuscan Grand Ducal Family: Grand Cross of St. Joseph
- Sovereign Military Order of Malta: Bailiff Grand Cross of Honour and Devotion, with Distinction for Jerusalem
- Kingdom of Prussia: Knight of the Black Eagle, 23 November 1901
- Kingdom of Bavaria: Knight of St. Hubert, 1892
- Saxe-Weimar-Eisenach: Grand Cross of the White Falcon
- Kingdom of Saxony: Knight of the Rue Crown
- Württemberg: Grand Cross of the Württemberg Crown, 1893
- Empire of Japan: Grand Cordon of the Order of the Chrysanthemum, 28 January 1901
- Persian Empire: Order of the August Portrait, in Diamonds
- Russian Empire:
  - Knight of St. Andrew
  - Knight of St. Alexander Nevsky
  - Knight of the White Eagle
  - Knight of St. Anna, 1st Class
  - Knight of St. Stanislaus, 1st Class
- Kingdom of Serbia: Grand Cross of the White Eagle
- Spain: Grand Cross of the Order of Charles III, with Collar, 21 May 1900
