= Archduchess Maria Annunziata of Austria =

Archduchess of Austria

Archduchess Maria Annunziata
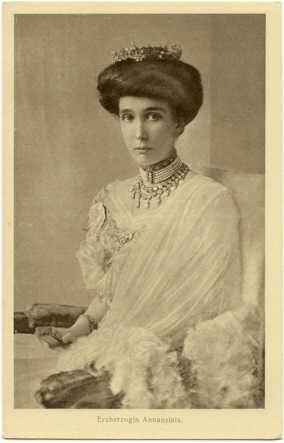
- Maria Annunziata c. 1905
- Born: 31 July 1876; Reichenau, Austria-Hungary
- Died: 8 April 1961 (aged 84); Vaduz, Liechtenstein
- Burial: St. Florian Cathedral, Vaduz, Liechtenstein
Names
- Maria Annunziata Adelheid Theresia Michaela Karoline Luise Pia Ignatia
- House: Habsburg-Lorraine
- Father: Archduke Karl Ludwig of Austria
- Mother: Infanta Maria Theresa of Portugal

Archduchess Maria Annunziata of Austria (31 July 1876 – 8 April 1961) was a daughter of Archduke Karl Ludwig of Austria and his third wife, Infanta Maria Theresa of Portugal. She was Princess-Abbess of the Theresian Royal and Imperial Ladies Chapter of the Castle of Prague (1894–1918).

== Biography ==
While staying with Archduke Franz Ferdinand of Austria, Duke Siegfried August in Bavaria met his host's unmarried half-sister, Archduchess Maria Annunziata, he fell in love with her, and their engagement was to be announced in due course.

Two months later, in August 1902, the engagement was broken off by the Archduchess, owing to her sudden discovery of the stormy antecedents of her fiancé, which she had been ignorant of at the time when she had promised to become his wife. The breaking off of the engagement was a matter which was arranged between the young people themselves, and that they had been deeply in love with each other was shown by the appeal immediately afterward by the Archduchess to the Emperor for permission to enter Holy Orders and to take the vows of a Benedictine nun, while the Duke became prey to melancholia, which in due course developed into insanity, rendering his confinement necessary.

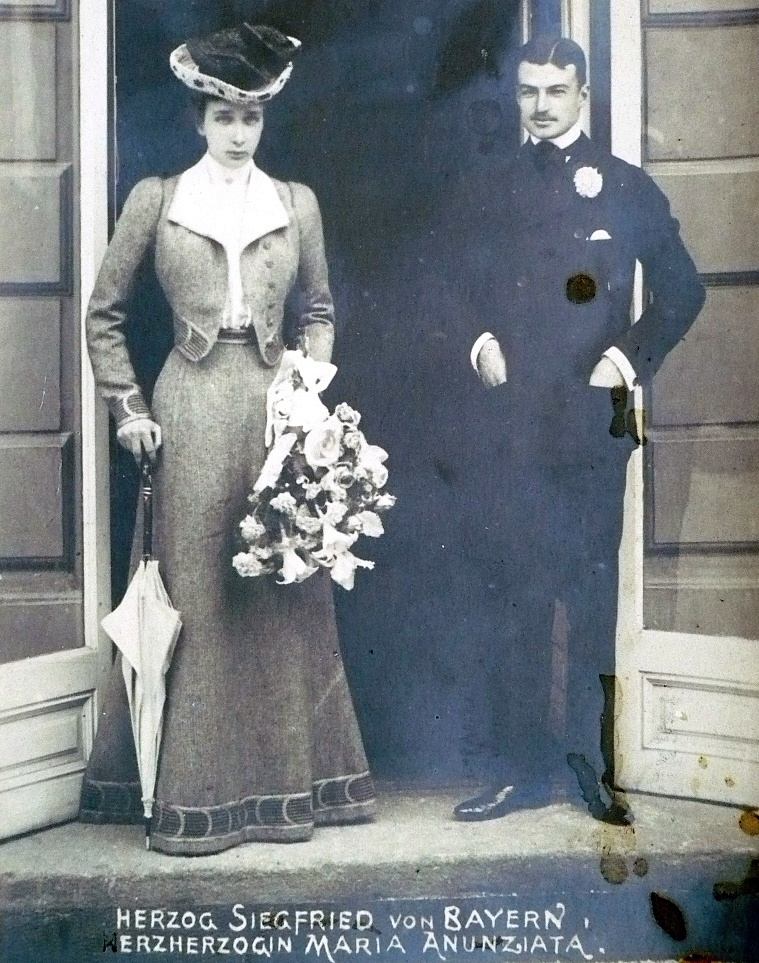
Duke Siegfried August in Bavaria and his fiancée Archduchess Maria Annunziata

Emperor Franz Joseph I of Austria declined to allow his niece to become a nun, pointing out to her that she should be content with her office of Princess Abbess of the Order of Noble Ladies of the Hradschin at Prague, which was a sort of semi-ecclesiastical dignity invariably held by a Princess of the Imperial house. The Lady Abbess of this particular order was the only woman to whom is accorded the right of fulfilling certain Episcopal functions, it being the prerogative of her office to crown the Queen of Bohemia when the Cardinal Archbishop of Prague, crowns the King. Among the insignia of her rank are an Episcopal miter and an Episcopal crozier, and she wore an Episcopal ring of office, which the ladies of the order were required to kiss. But there are no pledges of perpetual celibacy taken in connection with the order. Its members are at liberty to wed at any time they wish, this of course entailing their leaving the order, which was organized for the purpose of providing suitably for the ladies of the nobility who had become impoverished through no fault of their own. Each of the members of the order bears the honorary title of “Canoness.’

Archduchess Maria Annunziata took her religious duties in connection with her office more to heart than any of her predecessors. She considered it to be incumbent upon her to break off her engagement to the Prince.

The archduchess spent the last years of her life with her sister Elisabeth Amalie in Liechtenstein. She died in Vaduz on 8 April 1961 at the age of 84. She was buried in the princely tomb in the crypt of the Cathedral of St. Florin in Vaduz.

== Ancestry ==
Ancestors of Archduchess Maria Annunziata of Austria

8. Francis II, Holy Roman Emperor
4. Archduke Franz Karl of Austria
9. Princess Maria Theresa of Naples and Sicily
2. Archduke Karl Ludwig of Austria
10. Maximilian I Joseph of Bavaria
5. Princess Sophie of Bavaria
11. Princess Caroline of Baden
1. Archduchess Maria Annunziata of Austria
12. John VI of Portugal
6. Miguel I of Portugal
13. Infanta Carlota Joaquina of Spain
3. Infanta Maria Theresa of Portugal
14. Constantine, Hereditary Prince of Löwenstein
7. Princess Adelaide of Löwenstein
15. Princess Agnes of Hohenlohe-Langenburg

== See also ==
- Descendants of Miguel I of Portugal
