= Infanta Maria Theresa of Portugal =

Austrian and Portuguese royal (1855–1944)

Infanta Maria Theresa
- Archduchess Karl Ludwig of Austria
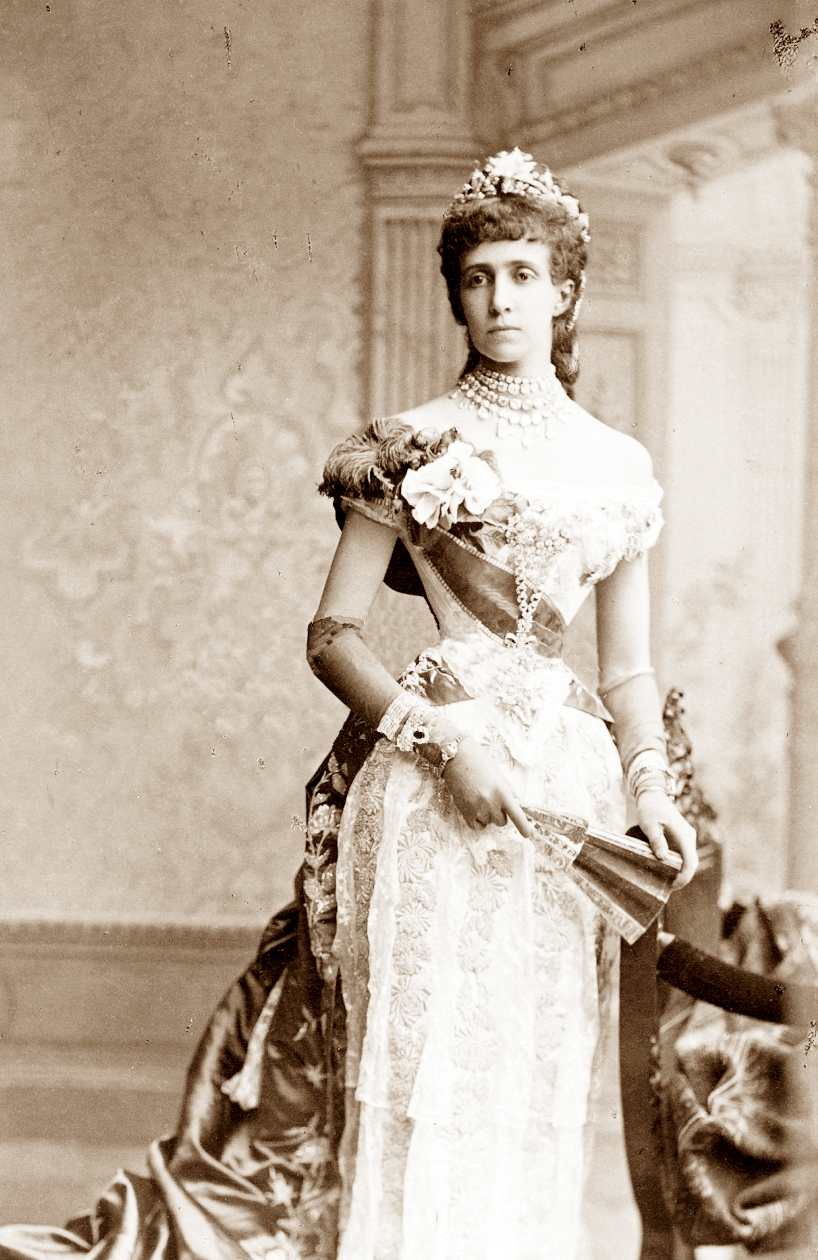
- Photograph in 1884
- Born: 24 August 1855; Löwenstein Castle, Kleinheubach, Kingdom of Bavaria
- Died: 12 February 1944 (aged 88); Vienna, Austria
- Burial: Imperial Crypt
- Spouse: Archduke Karl Ludwig of Austria (m. 1873; died 1896)
- Issue: Archduchess Maria Annunziata; Princess Elisabeth of Liechtenstein
Names
- Portuguese: Maria Teresa da Imaculada Conceição Fernanda Eulália Leopoldina Adelaide Isabel Carolina Micaela Rafaela Gabriela Francisca de Assis de Paula Gonzaga Inês Sofia Bartolomeu dos Anjos
- House: Braganza
- Father: Miguel I of Portugal
- Mother: Adelaide of Löwenstein

Infanta Maria Theresa of Portugal (Portuguese: Maria Teresa; 24 August 1855 – 12 February 1944) was a Princess of the House of Braganza. She became by marriage an Archduchess of Austria and also sister-in-law of Emperors Franz Joseph I of Austria and Maximilian I of Mexico, as well as step-grandmother of Emperor Charles I of Austria.

== Early life ==
Maria Teresa was born in Kleinheubach, Kingdom of Bavaria, as the second daughter of Miguel I of Portugal and Princess Adelaide of Löwenstein. Her father became king of Portugal in 1828 after deposing his niece Queen Maria II. He reigned until 1834 when Maria II was restored and Miguel was forced into exile.

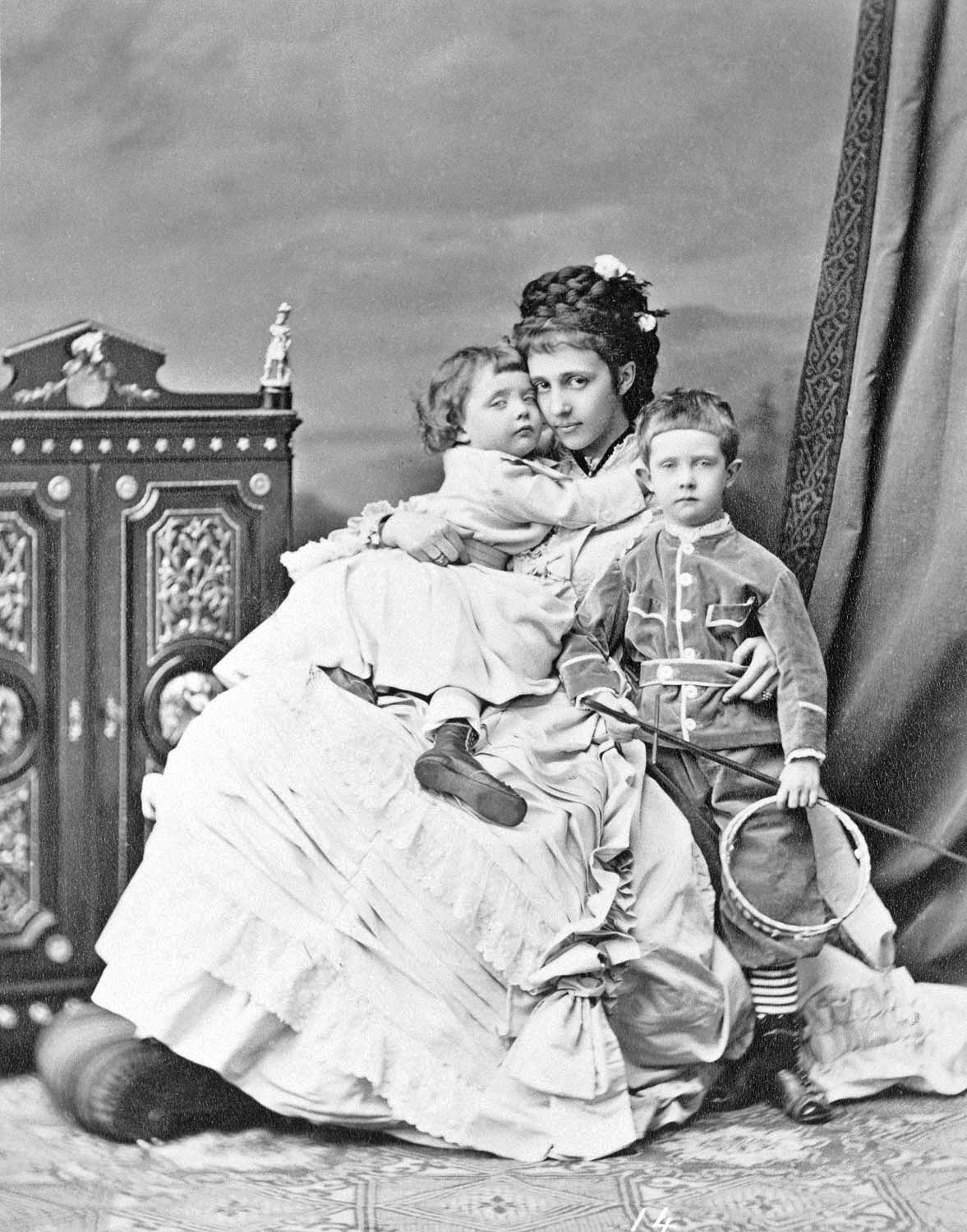
Maria Teresa with Archduke Ferdinand and Archduchess Margareta, her husband's two youngest children by his second wife Maria Annunziata

Described as one of the most beautiful women in Europe, Maria Theresa became the third wife of Archduke Karl Ludwig of Austria, a younger brother of the Austrian Emperor Franz Joseph I of Austria, at Kleinheubach on 23 July 1873. Despite providing him with two daughters Archduchess Maria Annunziata of Austria and Archduchess Elisabeth Amalie of Austria, the marriage was an unhappy one due to her husband's bullying and tormenting of her. In addition to their daughters she also became stepmother to his children by his second wife, Archduke Franz Ferdinand of Austria, Archduke Otto Franz of Austria, Archduke Ferdinand Karl of Austria and Archduchess Margarete Sophie of Austria.

Maria Theresa managed to obtain considerable influence at the Austrian court when Empress Elisabeth effectively withdrew from the social scene in Vienna after the suicide of her only son, Crown Prince Rudolf, in January 1889. Maria Theresa stood in for the Empress and carried out honours at the Hofburg Imperial Palace with the Emperor until the death of her husband in 1896, when court etiquette ruled she had to go into retirement.

== Widowhood ==
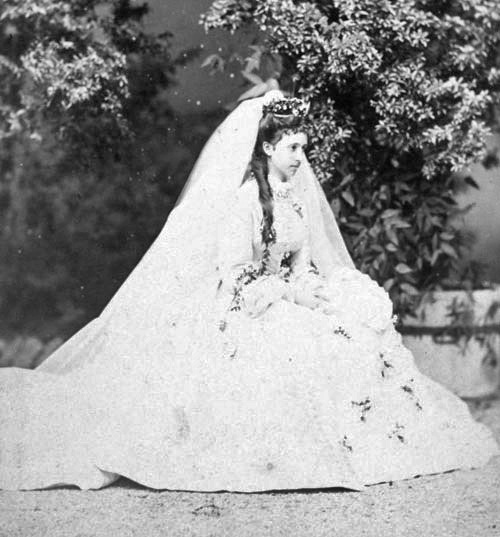
Infanta Maria Theresa of Portugal in her wedding gown, 1873.

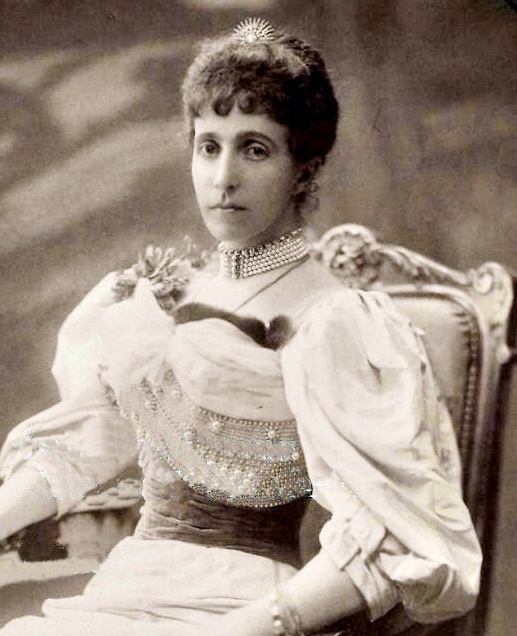
Archduchess Maria Theresa of Austria, 1897.

She remained such an influential figure behind the scenes at court after the death of her husband that when rumors spread that she was to marry the master of her household, Count Ladislaus Cavriani, no one dared to say a word against her. In the end the rumors turned out to be false. During her widowhood she spent the winter months living in Vienna and the summer months at Reichstadt castle in Bohemia.

She offered encouragement and support to her stepson Franz Ferdinand in his determination to marry Countess Sophie Chotek against his family's will. She traveled to a convent in Prague herself to fetch Sophie and took her into her own house, even pleading on Sophie's behalf with the Emperor Franz Joseph. After the union was finally permitted, Maria Theresa made all the arrangements for the wedding, insisting that it take place in her own private chapel.

She remained close to Franz Ferdinand and Sophie until their assassination in Sarajevo on 28 June 1914. It was she who broke the news of the couple's death to their children Sophie, Maximilian and Ernst. She also managed to ensure the children's financial security after telling the Emperor that if he did not grant them a yearly income, she would resign the allowance which she drew as a widow in their favour. (Most of Franz Ferdinand's property went to his nephew the Archduke Charles).

On 21 November 1916, her brother-in-law Emperor Franz Joseph died, and Archduke Charles, son of Archduke Otto Franz of Austria and nephew of Franz Ferdinand, became the new Emperor of Austria and King of Hungary. He reigned until November 1918 when the Austro-Hungarian Empire collapsed following its defeat in the First World War. After his departure from Austria (he never formally abdicated), Maria Theresa accompanied Karl and his wife Zita into exile in Madeira, but eventually returned to Vienna, where she spent the rest of her life.

In 1929, following a decline in her finances, Maria Theresa engaged two agents to sell the Napoleon Diamond Necklace, a piece inherited from her husband, in the United States. After a series of botched sales attempts, the pair finally sold the necklace for $60,000 with the aid of the great-nephew of Maria Theresa, the Archduke Leopold of Austria, Prince of Tuscany, but he claimed nearly 90% of the sale price as "expenses". Maria Theresa appealed to the United States courts, ultimately resulting in the recovery of the necklace, the imprisonment of her great-nephew, and the absconding of the two agents.

Maria Theresa died in Vienna during World War II.

== Issue ==
| Name | Birth | Death | Notes |
|---|---|---|---|
by Archduke Karl Ludwig Joseph Maria of Austria (30 July 1833–19 May 1896; married on 23 July 1873 in Kleinheubach)
| Archduchess Maria Annunciata of Austria | 31 July 1876 in Reichenau, Austria-Hungary | 8 April 1961 in Vaduz, Principality of Liechtenstein | Abbess of the Theresia Convent in the Hradschin, Prague, died unmarried |
| Archduchess Elisabeth Amalie of Austria | 7 July 1878 in Reichenau, Austria-Hungary | 13 March 1960 in Vaduz, Principality of Liechtenstein | married, 1903, Prince Alois of Liechtenstein; had issue |

== Ancestry ==
Ancestors of Infanta Maria Theresa of Portugal

8. Peter III of Portugal
4. John VI of Portugal and Brazil
9. Maria I of Portugal and Brazil
2. Miguel I of Portugal
10. Charles IV of Spain
5. Infanta Carlota Joaquina of Spain
11. Princess Maria Luisa of Parma
1. Infanta Maria Teresa of Portugal
12. Charles Thomas, Prince of Löwenstein
6. Constantine, Hereditary Prince of Löwenstein
13. Countess Sophie of Windisch-Graetz
3. Princess Adelaide of Löwenstein
14. Karl Ludwig, Prince of Hohenlohe-Langenburg
7. Princess Agnes of Hohenlohe-Langenburg
15. Countess Amalie Henriette of Solms-Baruth

== See also ==
- Descendants of Miguel I of Portugal

== Sources ==
- Radziwill, Catherine (1916). The Austrian Court From Within. Cassell and Company.
