= Archduke Karl Ludwig of Austria =

Austrian archduke (1833–1896)

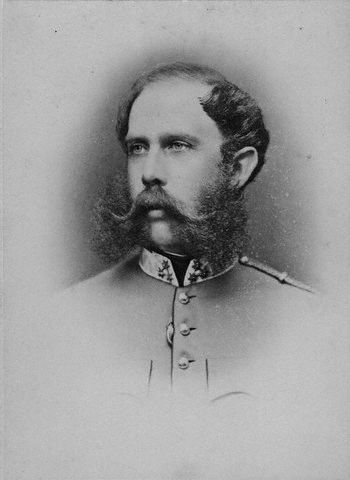
- Photograph by Ludwig Angerer, about 1861
- Born: 30 July 1833; Schönbrunn Palace, Vienna, Austrian Empire
- Died: 19 May 1896 (aged 62); Vienna, Austria-Hungary
- Burial: Imperial Crypt, Vienna
- Spouse: Princess Margaretha of Saxony (m. 1856; died 1858) Princess Maria Annunziata of Bourbon-Two Sicilies (m. 1862; died 1871) Infanta Maria Theresa of Portugal (m. 1873)
- Issue: Archduke Franz Ferdinand; Archduke Otto Franz Joseph; Archduke Ferdinand Karl; Margarete Sophie, Duchess of Württemberg; Archduchess Maria Annunziata; Elisabeth Amalie, Princess of Liechtenstein
Names
- German: Karl Ludwig Josef Maria; English: Charles Louis Joseph Maria
- House: Habsburg-Lorraine
- Father: Archduke Franz Karl of Austria
- Mother: Princess Sophie of Bavaria

Archduke Karl Ludwig Josef Maria of Austria (30 July 1833 – 19 May 1896) was the younger brother of both Franz Joseph I of Austria and Maximilian I of Mexico, and the father of Archduke Franz Ferdinand of Austria (1863–1914), whose assassination ignited World War I. His grandson, Charles I, was the last emperor of Austria.

== Biography ==
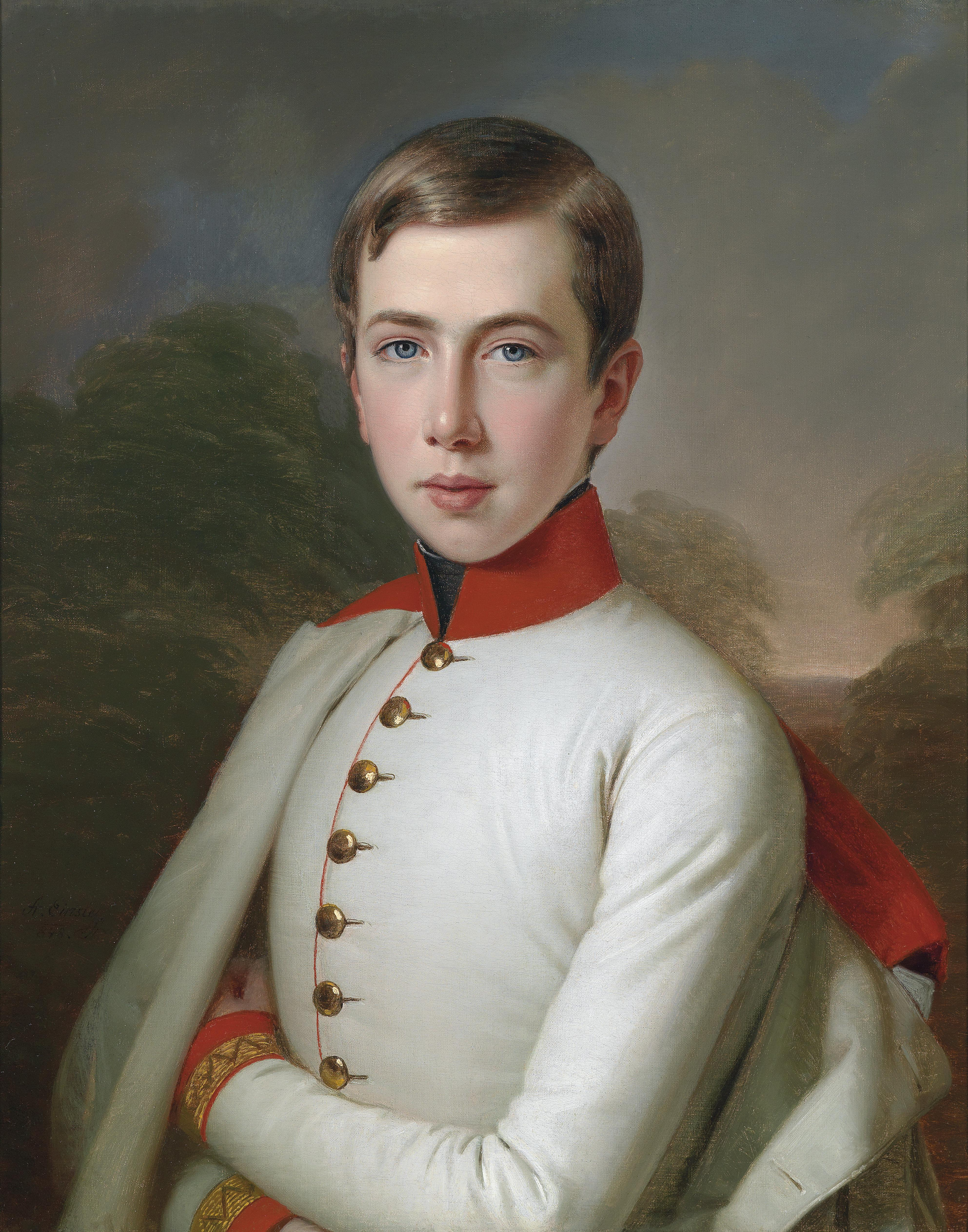
An 1848 portrait of Karl Ludwig by Anton Einsle

He was born at Schönbrunn Palace in Vienna, the son of Archduke Franz Karl of Austria (1802–1878) and his wife Princess Sophie of Bavaria (1805–1872).

His mother ensured he was raised a devout Roman Catholic by the Vienna prince-archbishop Joseph Othmar Rauscher.

Though not interested in politics, the 20-year-old joined the Galician government of Count Agenor Romuald Gołuchowski and in 1855 accepted his appointment as Tyrolean stadtholder in Innsbruck, where he took his residence at Ambras Castle. However, he found his authority to exert power restricted by the Austrian cabinet of his cousin Archduke Rainer Ferdinand and Baron Alexander von Bach. He finally laid down the office upon the issue of the 1861 February Patent for a life as patron of the arts and sciences.

As the eldest surviving brother of the Emperor, Karl Ludwig, after the death of his nephew Crown Prince Rudolf of Austria in 1889, became heir presumptive to the Austro-Hungarian Empire. A newspaper article appeared shortly after the death of his nephew claiming that the Archduke had renounced his succession rights in favor of his eldest son Franz Ferdinand. This rumor proved to be false.

== Marriage and family ==
Monarchical styles of Archduke Karl Ludwig of Austria
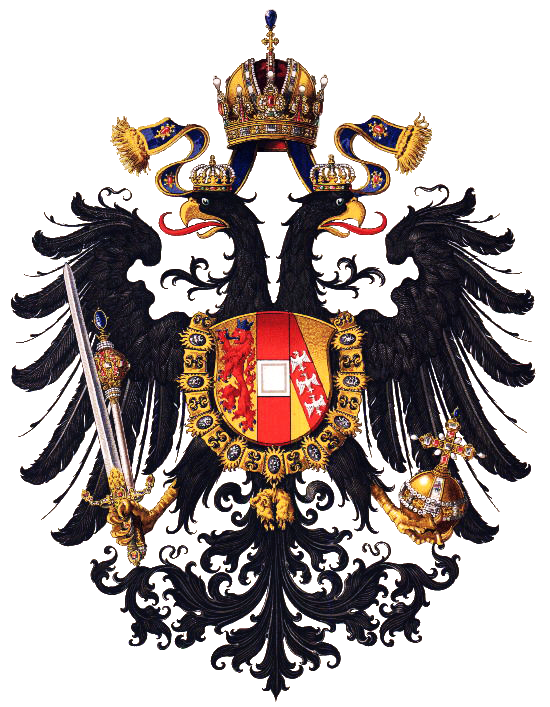
- Reference style: His Imperial and Royal Highness
- Spoken style: Your Imperial and Royal Highness

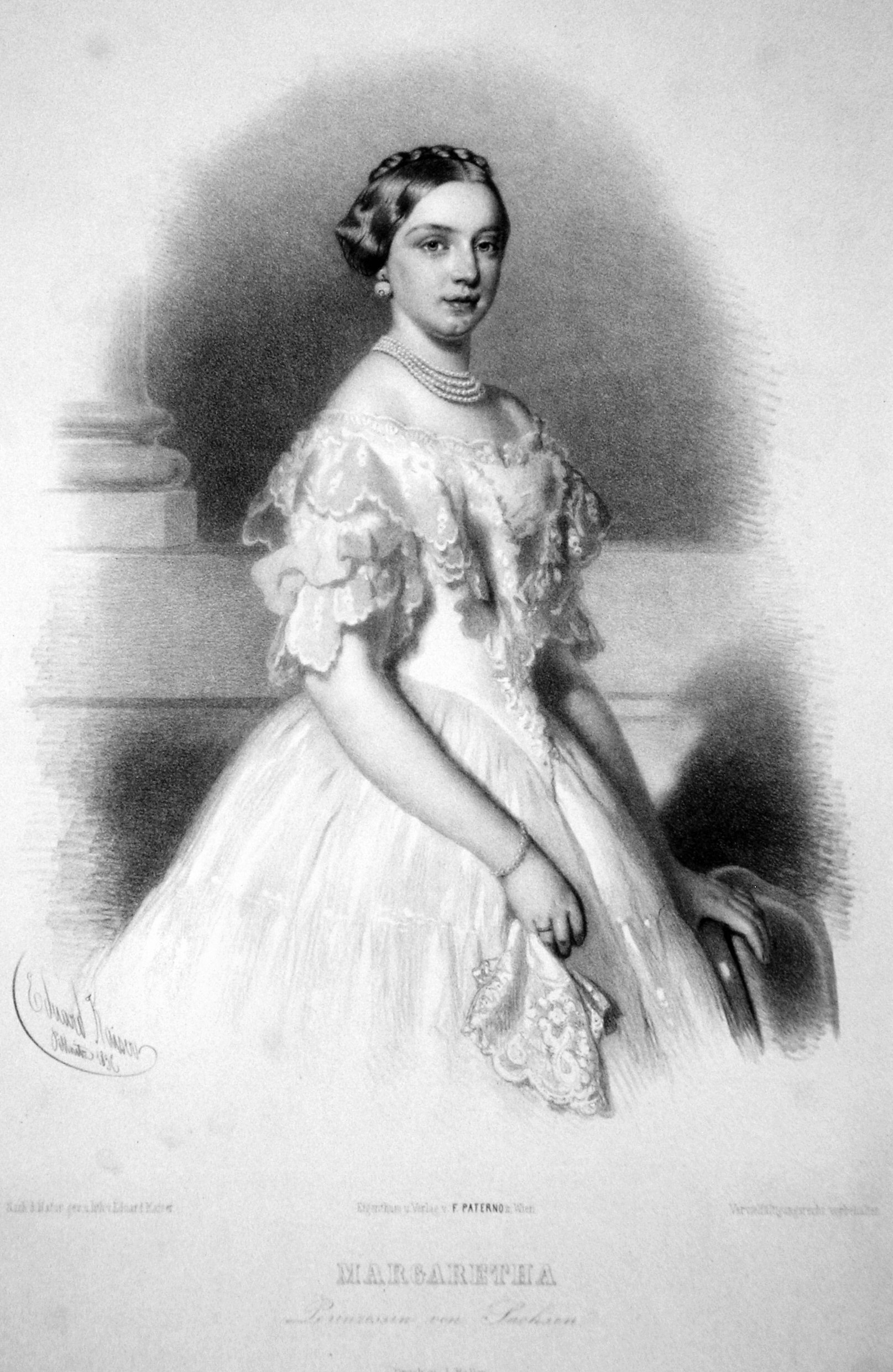
Princess Margaretha of Saxony

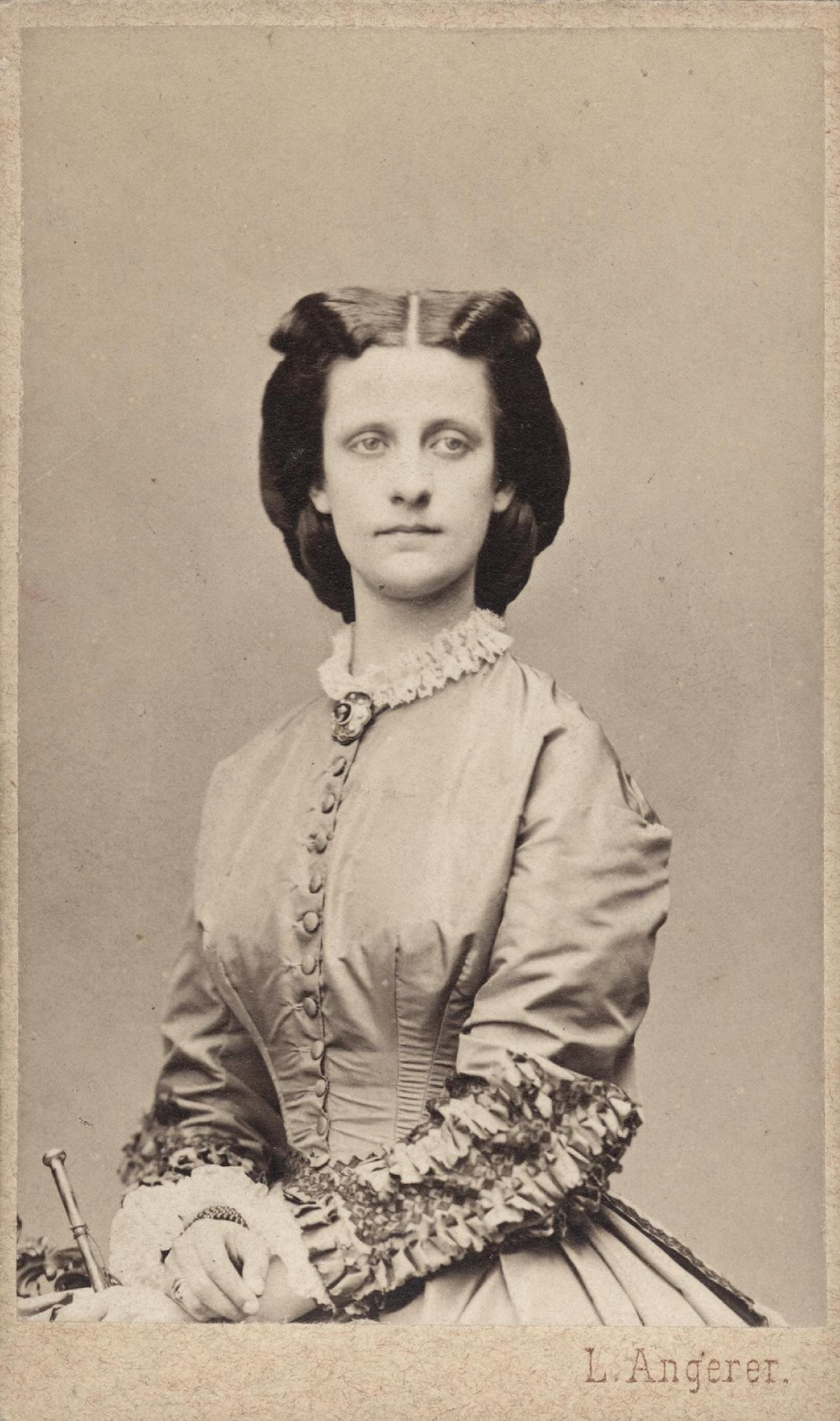
Princess Maria Annunziata of Bourbon-Two Sicilies, Archduchess of Austria

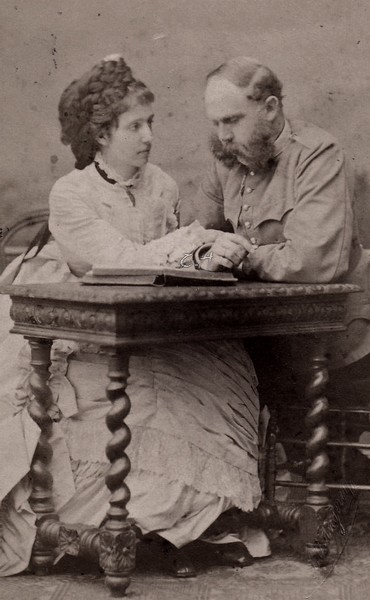
Karl Ludwig and his third wife, Maria Teresa of Portugal

Karl Ludwig married three times.

His first wife, whom he married on 4 November 1856 at Dresden, was his first cousin Margaretha of Saxony (1840–1858), the daughter of Johann of Saxony (1801–1873) and Amalie Auguste of Bavaria (1801–1877). She died on 15 September 1858 and they had no children.

His second wife, whom he married by proxy on 16 October 1862 at Rome, and in person on 21 October 1862 at Venice, was Princess Maria Annunziata of Bourbon-Two Sicilies (1843–1871), daughter of Ferdinand II of the Two Sicilies (1810–1859) and Maria Theresa of Austria (1816–1867).

They had four children:

- Archduke Franz Ferdinand of Austria (18 December 1863 – 28 June 1914), whose assassination was a cause for the First World War. He married morganatically Countess Sophie Chotek von Chotkow und Wognin on 1 July 1900. They had three children.
- Archduke Otto Franz Joseph of Austria (21 April 1865 – 1 November 1906) he married Princess Maria Josepha of Saxony (1867–1944) on 2 October 1886. They had two sons, including Charles I, the last Emperor of Austria.
- Archduke Ferdinand Karl of Austria (27 December 1868 – 12 March 1915) he married morganatically Bertha Czuber on 15 August 1909.
- Archduchess Margarete Sophie of Austria (13 May 1870 – 24 August 1902) she married Albrecht, Duke of Württemberg on 24 January 1893. They had seven children.

Maria Annunziata died on 4 May 1871.

His third wife, whom he married on 23 July 1873 at Kleinheubach, was Infanta Maria Theresa of Portugal (1855–1944), daughter of Miguel I of Portugal (1802–1866) and Adelaide of Löwenstein-Wertheim-Rosenberg (1831–1909).

They had two daughters:

- Archduchess Maria Annunziata of Austria (31 July 1876 – 8 April 1961). Abbess of the Theresia Convent in the Hradschin, Prague.
- Archduchess Elisabeth Amalie of Austria (7 July 1878 – 13 March 1960) she married Prince Aloys of Liechtenstein on 20 April 1903. They had eight children.

== Death ==
Karl Ludwig died of typhoid at Schönbrunn in Vienna after returning from a journey to Palestine and Egypt, allegedly after the consumption of contaminated Jordan waters.

His widow Maria Teresa died on 12 February 1944.

== Honours and awards ==
Austrian orders and decorations

- Knight of the Golden Fleece, 1852
- Grand Cross of St. Stephen, 1859
- Military Merit Medal on red ribbon
- Long Service Cross for Officers, 2nd Class

Foreign orders and decorations

- Baden: Knight of the House Order of Fidelity, 1873
- Kingdom of Bavaria: Knight of St. Hubert, 1853
- Belgium: Grand Cordon of the Order of Leopold, 20 May 1853 – wedding gift
- Empire of Brazil: Grand Cross of the Southern Cross
- Duchy of Brunswick: Grand Cross of Henry the Lion
- Denmark: Knight of the Elephant, 21 July 1890
- (Saxe-Coburg and Gotha) (Duchy of Saxe-Altenburg) (Saxe-Meiningen) Ernestine duchies: Grand Cross of the Saxe-Ernestine House Order, May 1857
- French Empire: Grand Cross of the Legion of Honour
- Kingdom of Greece: Grand Cross of the Redeemer
- Grand Duchy of Hesse: Grand Cross of the Ludwig Order, 13 August 1851
- Kingdom of Italy: Knight of the Annunciation, 21 September 1873
  - (Tuscany) Tuscan Grand Ducal Family: Grand Cross of St. Joseph
  - (Kingdom of the Two Sicilies) Two Sicilian Royal Family: Grand Cross of St. Ferdinand and Merit
- Holy See: Grand Cross of the Order of Pope Pius IX
- Sovereign Military Order of Malta: Grand Cross of Honour and Devotion
- Mexican Empire: Grand Cross of the Mexican Eagle
- (Duchy of Nassau) Nassau Ducal Family: Knight of the Gold Lion of Nassau
- Netherlands: Grand Cross of the Netherlands Lion
- Ottoman Empire: Order of Osmanieh, 1st Class in Diamonds
- Persian Empire: Order of the August Portrait, in Diamonds
- Kingdom of Portugal: Grand Cross of the Tower and Sword
- Kingdom of Prussia:
  - Knight of the Black Eagle, 4 June 1853; with Collar, 1861
  - Knight of the Red Eagle, 1st Class
  - Grand Commander's Cross of the Royal House Order of Hohenzollern, 2 April 1877
- Kingdom of Romania: Grand Cross of the Star of Romania
- Russian Empire:
  - Knight of St. Andrew
  - Knight of St. Alexander Nevsky
  - Knight of the White Eagle
  - Knight of St. Anna, 1st Class
- Saxe-Weimar-Eisenach: Grand Cross of the White Falcon, 1885
- Kingdom of Saxony: Knight of the Rue Crown
- Principality of Serbia: Grand Cross of the Cross of Takovo
- (Thailand) Siam: Grand Cross of the Crown of Siam, in Diamonds
- Spain: Grand Cross of the Order of Charles III, with Collar, 15 April 1888
- Sweden-Norway: Knight of the Seraphim, 7 January 1870
- Württemberg: Grand Cross of the Württemberg Crown, 1867

== Ancestry ==
Ancestors of Archduke Karl Ludwig of Austria

8. Leopold II, Holy Roman Emperor
4. Francis II, Holy Roman Emperor
9. Infanta Maria Louisa of Spain
2. Archduke Franz Karl of Austria
10. Ferdinand I of the Two Sicilies
5. Princess Maria Theresa of Naples and Sicily
11. Archduchess Maria Carolina of Austria
1. Archduke Karl Ludwig of Austria
12. Frederick Michael, Count Palatine of Zweibrücken
6. Maximilian I Joseph of Bavaria
13. Countess Palatine Maria Franziska of Sulzbach
3. Princess Sophie of Bavaria
14. Charles Louis, Hereditary Prince of Baden
7. Princess Caroline of Baden
15. Princess Amalie of Hesse-Darmstadt

== See also ==
- List of heirs to the Austrian throne

Karl Ludwig von Habsburg-Lorraine House of Habsburg-Lorraine Cadet branch of the House of Habsburg Born: 30 July 1833 Died: 19 May 1896
Austro-Hungarian royalty
Preceded by Rudolf	Heir to the Austrian throne 30 January 1889 – 19 May 1896	Succeeded by Franz Ferdinand
