= Princess Margaretha of Saxony =

Princess Margaretha
- Archduchess Karl Ludwig of Austria
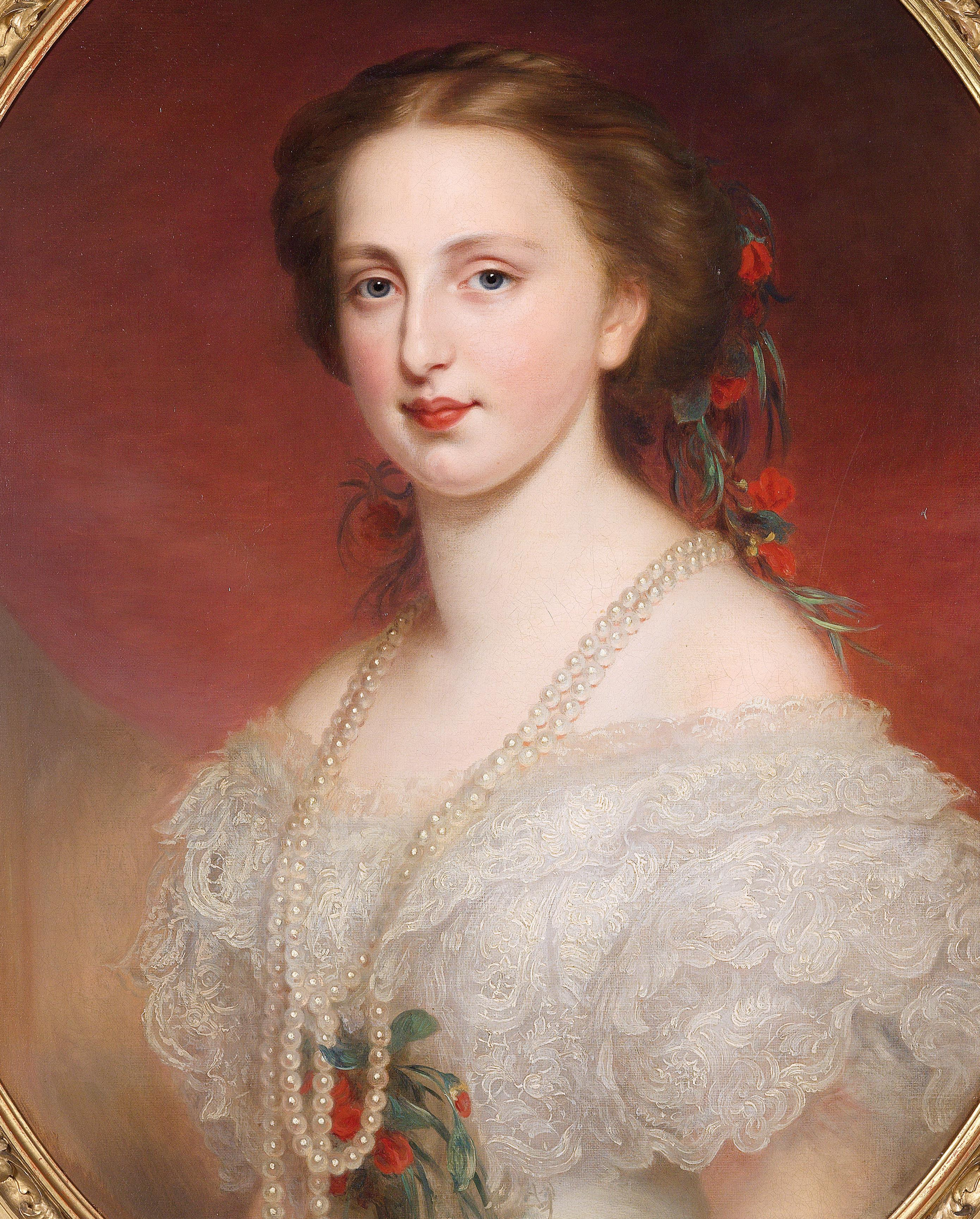
- Portrait c. 1858
- Born: 24 May 1840; Dresden, Kingdom of Saxony
- Died: 15 September 1858 (aged 18); Monza, Kingdom of Lombardy–Venetia
- Spouse: Archduke Karl Ludwig of Austria (m. 1856)
Names
- German: Margaretha Karoline Friederike Cecilie Auguste Amalie Josephine Elisabeth Maria Johanna
- House: Wettin
- Father: John, King of Saxony
- Mother: Amalie Auguste of Bavaria

Princess Margaretha of Saxony, Duchess of Saxony (German: Prinzessin Margaretha Karoline Friederike Cecilie Auguste Amalie Josephine Elisabeth Maria Johanna von Sachsen, Herzogin zu Sachsen; 24 May 1840 – 15 September 1858) was the eighth child and fifth eldest daughter of King John of Saxony and Princess Amalie Auguste of Bavaria and a younger sister of Kings Albert of Saxony and George of Saxony. She was born in Dresden, then in the Kingdom of Saxony. Through her marriage to Archduke Charles Louis of Austria, Margaretha was a member of the House of Habsburg-Lorraine and an Archduchess and Princess of Austria and Princess of Hungary, Croatia, Bohemia, and Tuscany.

== Marriage ==
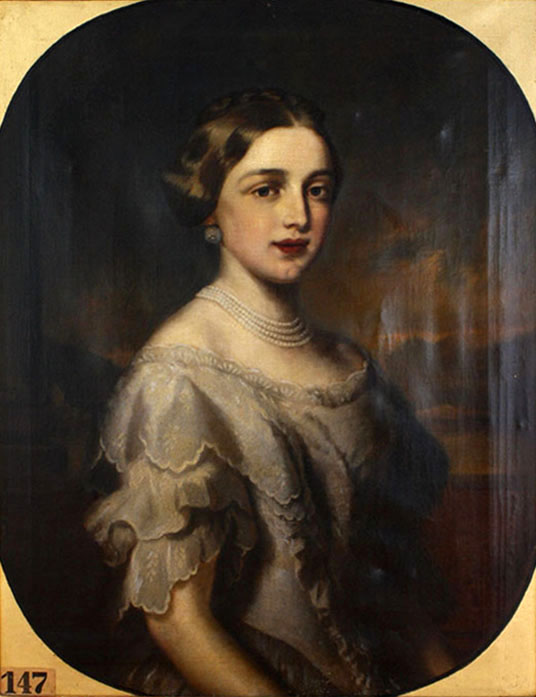
Archduchess Margarete

Margaretha married her first cousin Archduke Karl Ludwig of Austria, third eldest son of Archduke Franz Karl of Austria and Princess Sophie of Bavaria, on 4 November 1856 in Dresden. The marriage was happy, but only lasted two years and remained childless.

== Death ==
On a trip to Italy, Margaretha contracted typhoid. She died on 15 September 1858 at the age of 18 in Monza.Her heart was interred in the Hofkapelle in Innsbruck.

== Ancestry ==
Ancestors of Princess Margaretha of Saxony

8. Frederick Christian, Elector of Saxony
4. Maximilian, Hereditary Prince of Saxony
9. Duchess Maria Antonia of Bavaria
2. John of Saxony
10. Ferdinand, Duke of Parma
5. Princess Carolina of Parma
11. Archduchess Maria Amalia of Austria
1. Princess Margaretha of Saxony
12. Frederick Michael, Count Palatine of Zweibrücken
6. Maximilian I Joseph of Bavaria
13. Countess Palatine Maria Franziska of Sulzbach
3. Princess Amalie Auguste of Bavaria
14. Charles Louis, Hereditary Prince of Baden
7. Princess Caroline of Baden
15. Princess Amalie of Hesse-Darmstadt
