= Archduke Otto Franz Joseph of Austria =

Son of Archduke Karl Ludwig of Austria (1865–1906)

Archduke Otto Franz Joseph
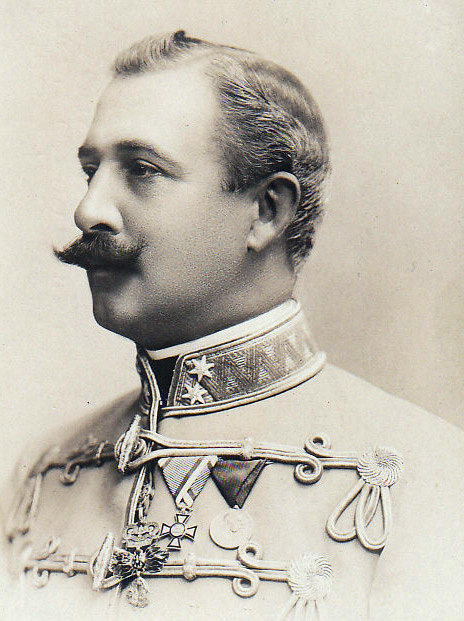
- Otto Franz Joseph in 1889
- Born: 21 April 1865; Graz, Austrian Empire
- Died: 1 November 1906 (aged 41); Vienna, Austria-Hungary
- Burial: Imperial Crypt
- Spouse: Princess Maria Josepha of Saxony (m. 1886)
- Issue: Charles I of Austria; Archduke Maximilian Eugen
Names
- German: Otto Franz Joseph Karl Ludwig Maria von Österreich; English: Otto Francis Joseph Charles Louis Maria of Austria
- House: Habsburg-Lorraine
- Father: Archduke Karl Ludwig of Austria
- Mother: Princess Maria Annunziata of Bourbon-Two Sicilies

Archduke Otto Franz Joseph Karl Ludwig Maria of Austria (21 April 1865 – 1 November 1906) was the second son of Archduke Karl Ludwig of Austria (younger brother of Emperor Franz Joseph I of Austria) and his second wife, Princess Maria Annunziata of Bourbon-Two Sicilies. He was the father of Charles I of Austria, the final Emperor of Austria.

== Biography ==
=== Youth ===
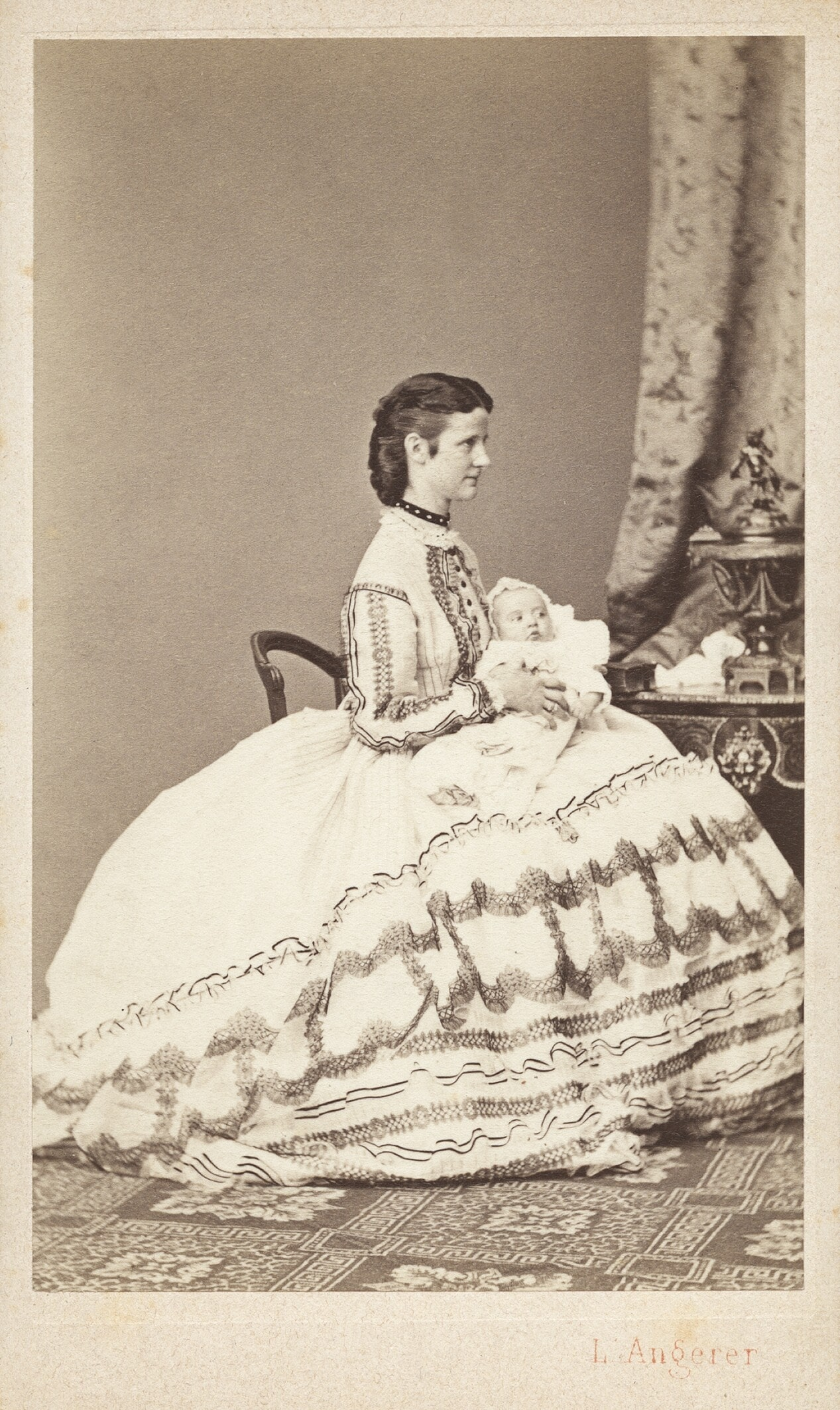
Archduchess Maria Annunziata holding the young Archduke in her lap

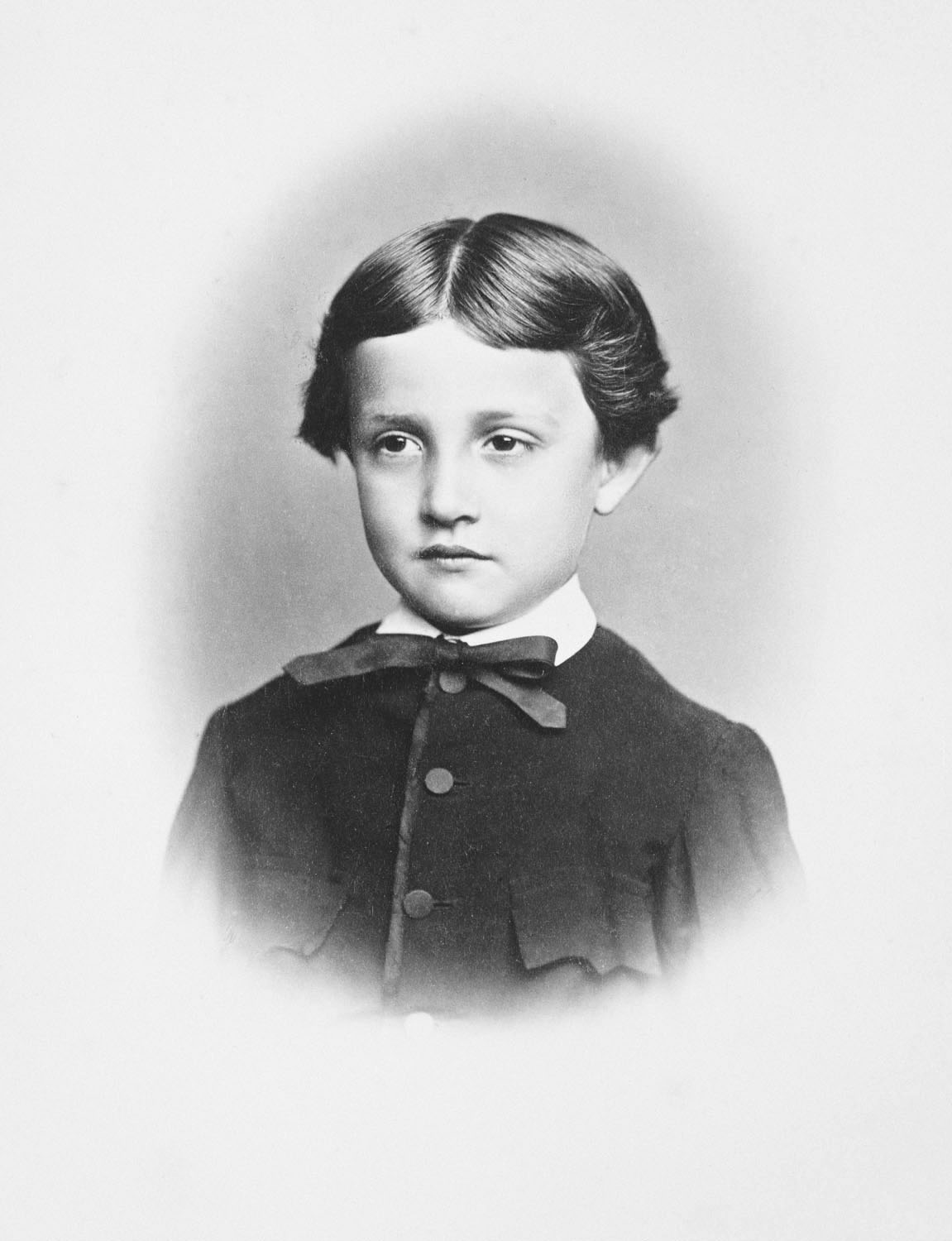
Archduke Otto in 1870

Monarchical styles of Archduke Otto Franz of Austria
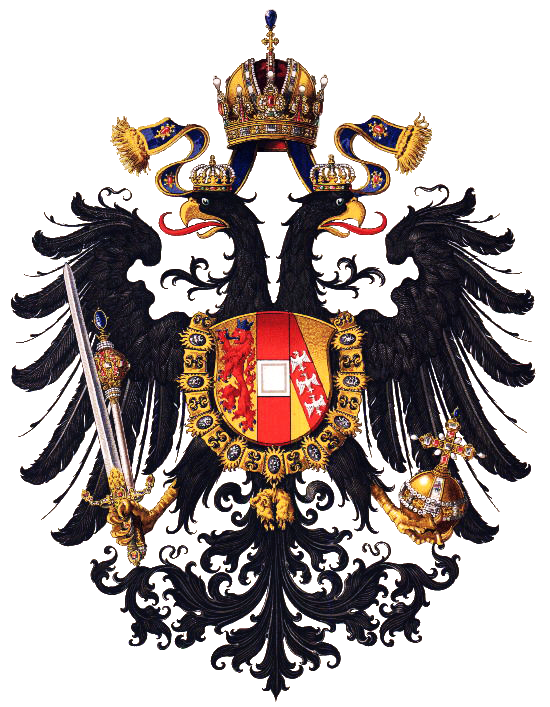
- Reference style: His Imperial and Royal Highness
- Spoken style: Your Imperial and Royal Highness

Otto's mother died when he was six years old. Otto and his elder brother Franz Ferdinand were taught by Alfred Ludwig, Baron of Degenfeld. Otto was not interested in learning and often played pranks on his teachers. Nevertheless, his teachers preferred the cheerful Otto more than his grumpy and irascible older brother. He was also his father's favourite, which led to a challenging relationship with his brother.

Otto had a reputation as a loafer and was often involved in scandals. In one instance, he was known to have jumped nude from a private dining room in the Hotel Sacher in front of a visiting British peeress. He is also widely remembered for the widely circulated story that he had been spotted in a hallway at the same hotel, about to enter a lady's room, wearing nothing else but a sword. He was gradually alienated from the imperial court, and eventually even his wife distanced herself from him.

== Marriage and issue ==
Under pressure from the imperial court, he married Princess Maria Josepha of Saxony, daughter of King Georg of Saxony on October 2, 1886. The court in Vienna urgently needed such a wedding to repair their relationship with the Saxon royal family, after both Crown Prince Rudolf of Austria and Otto's brother Franz Ferdinand had snubbed the Saxons by rejecting Maria's elder sister Mathilde.

Otto and Maria had two sons:

- Charles I of Austria married Princess Zita of Bourbon-Parma and had issue.
- Archduke Maximilian Eugen of Austria married Princess Franziska von Hohenlohe-Waldenburg-Schillingsfürst and had issue.

Their marriage was unhappy, and the Archduke was often unfaithful. He had illegitimate children including two by his mistress, Marie Schleinzer: The children were given the title and surname Edler von Hortenau.

- Alfred Joseph von Hortenau, father of the actress Isabel del Puerto
- Hildegard von Hortenau

With Louise Robinson he had two children. Son became an electrician and daughter a governess in Wiesbaden, Germany. After WWI both emigrated to America.

=== Death ===
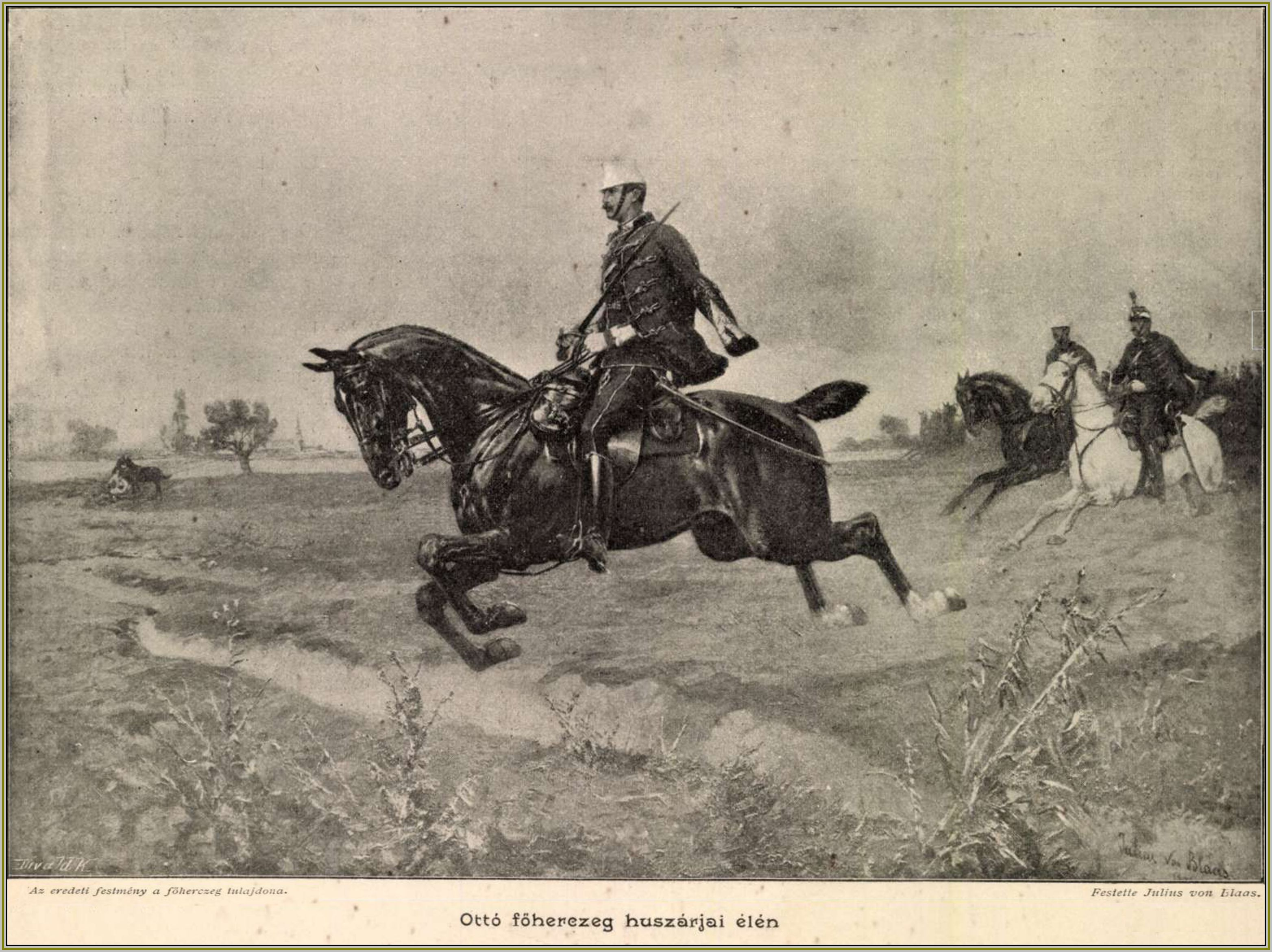
The Archduke at the head of his hussars. Print by Károly Divald after a painting by Julius von Blaas

Around 1900, he contracted syphilis. This caused him agonizing pain for the last two years of his life. He withdrew from public life and spent a year in Egypt, where he found temporary reprieve. He returned to Austria, where he fell ill again. The last few months of his life, he lived in a villa in the Viennese suburb Währing. He was forced to replace his nose with a rubber prosthetic due to facial deformity. He was seriously ill, and was nursed by his last mistress, Louise Robinson (8.1.1886 Kleve am Rhein - 9.11.1934 Vienna), using the pseudonym Sister Martha, and by his stepmother Infanta Maria Theresa of Portugal. He died on 1 November 1906, in the presence of his spiritual adviser, Godfried Marschall (de), the auxiliary bishop of Vienna.

== Succession ==
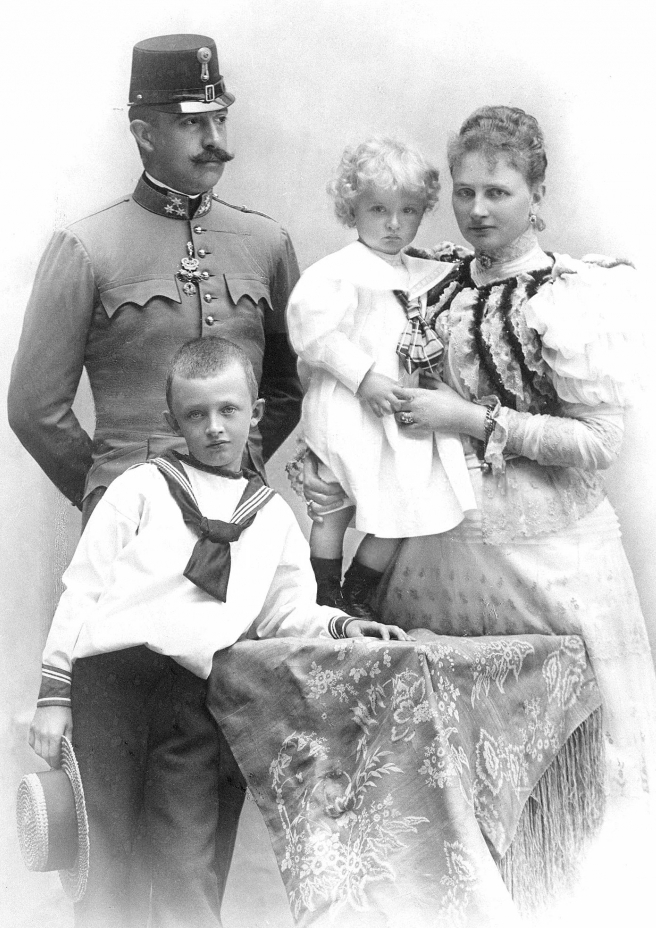
Archduke Otto Franz and his family

Otto's father, Karl Ludwig, was a younger brother of Emperor Franz Joseph I of Austria; and Karl Ludwig became heir presumptive to the Austro-Hungarian throne when his nephew Crown Prince Rudolf committed suicide in 1889.

On the death of Karl Ludwig in May 1896, Otto's brother Franz Ferdinand became heir presumptive to the Austro-Hungarian throne. However, it did not escape the public's attention that the Emperor never commented on his new heir-presumptive.

Count Gołuchowski, the Foreign Minister, had suggested that the emperor, considering Franz Ferdinand's lung disease and tuberculosis, might reconsider the line of succession due to concerns that his health might never allow him to fulfill a role as future emperor.

This led to speculations that Otto might inherit the throne instead. It was noticed that Otto had more personnel than was usual for an archduke and that he carried out representative tasks that would normally be done by the heir presumptive. Despite his life style, Otto was more popular among the courtiers than his elder brother. Franz Ferdinand was outraged by these speculations and by the fact that he had received the modest Modena Palace as his residence and Otto the larger Augarten Palace. Franz Ferdinand felt snubbed, although Otto assured him he had no ambitions for the throne.

As Otto passed away in 1906, he was never first in line to the throne. Franz Ferdinand was assassinated in 1914 by the Serbian nationalist terrorist Gavrilo Princip in Sarajevo, whereupon Otto's son Charles became heir presumptive. Upon the death of Emperor Franz Joseph in 1916, Charles inherited the throne.

== Honours ==
The mountain lodge Erzherzog-Otto-Schutzhaus on the Rax plateau in Lower Austria, is named after him.

=== Decorations and awards ===
- (Austrian Empire) (Kingdom of Hungary) Austria-Hungary:
  - Knight of the Golden Fleece, 1881
  - Grand Cross of the Royal Hungarian Order of St. Stephen, 1902
  - Military Merit Cross
  - Bronze Jubilee Medal for the Armed Forces
  - Long Service Cross for Officers, 3rd Class
- (Tuscany) Tuscan Grand Ducal family: Grand Cross of St. Joseph
- Sovereign Military Order of Malta: Bailiff Grand Cross of Honour and Devotion, with Distinction for Jerusalem
- Russian Empire:
  - Knight of St. Andrew
  - Knight of St. Alexander Nevsky
  - Knight of St. Anna, 1st Class
  - Knight of the White Eagle
- Kingdom of Prussia: Knight of the Black Eagle
- Kingdom of Italy: Knight of the Annunciation, 15 December 1898
- Spain: Grand Cross of the Order of Charles III, 26 April 1886
- Kingdom of Saxony: Knight of the Rue Crown, 1886
- Württemberg: Grand Cross of the Württemberg Crown, 1893
- Belgium: Grand Cordon of the Order of Leopold
- Kingdom of Romania: Grand Cross of the Star of Romania
- Kingdom of Serbia: Grand Cross of the White Eagle
- (Thailand) Siam: Knight of the Order of the Royal House of Chakri, 23 June 1897
- Grand Duchy of Hesse: Grand Cross of the Ludwig Order, 16 May 1893
- Saxe-Weimar-Eisenach: Grand Cross of the White Falcon
- (Saxe-Coburg and Gotha) (Duchy of Saxe-Altenburg) (Saxe-Meiningen) Ernestine duchies: Grand Cross of the Saxe-Ernestine House Order

== Ancestry ==
Ancestors of Archduke Otto Franz Joseph of Austria

8. Francis II, Holy Roman Emperor
4. Archduke Franz Karl of Austria
9. Princess Maria Theresa of Naples and Sicily
2. Archduke Karl Ludwig of Austria
10. Maximilian I Joseph of Bavaria
5. Princess Sophie of Bavaria
11. Princess Caroline of Baden
1. Archduke Otto Franz Joseph of Austria
12. Francis I of the Two Sicilies
6. Ferdinand II of the Two Sicilies
13. Infanta Maria Isabella of Spain
3. Princess Maria Annunziata of Bourbon-Two Sicilies
14. Archduke Charles, Duke of Teschen
7. Archduchess Maria Theresa of Austria
15. Princess Henrietta of Nassau-Weilburg
