= Václav Antonín Chotek of Chotkov and Vojnín =

Czech nobleman and politician (1674–1754)

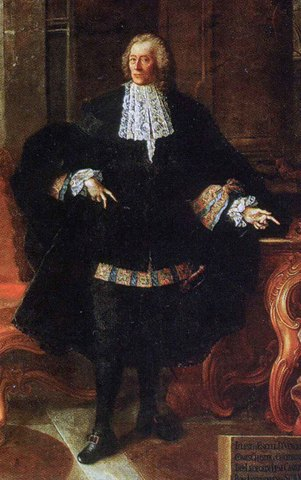
Václav Chotek in a 1698 portrait

Václav Antonín Chotek of Chotkov and Vojnín (Czech: Václav Antonín Chotek z Chotkova a Vojnína; German: Wenzel Anton Chotek von Chotkow und Wognin; 26 February 1674 – 2 May 1754) was a Czech nobleman and royal Stadtholder in the Kingdom of Bohemia. He was a member of the Chotek family.

== Family background ==
Václav Antonín Chotek of Chotkov and Vojnín was born in Bělušice, Bohemia, on 26 February 1674. His title was knight (Czech: rytíř; German: Ritter). He was son of Vilém Chotek of Chotkov and Vojnín (1628–1674) and his second wife Johanna Sabina Proy von Gaiselsberg und Findtelstein (1650–1692).

He married Maria Theresia Ludmilla Scheidler von Scheidlern (1684–1709) in 1698 in Karlovy Vary. She came from a family of lawyers. He was father of sevel children, including:

- František (1700–1708)
- Marie Anna (1701 – after 1770), a nun
- Terezie (1702–1749), a nun
- Václav (1703–1725)
- Johann Karl, Count Chotek of Chotkow and Wognin (1704–1787)
- Rudolf Chotek of Chotkov and Vojnín (1706–1771)
- Alžběta (1708–1712)

== Biographical data ==
On 6 February 1702, Václav Antonín Chotek Ritter (Knight) of Chotkov and Vojnín was received into the Bohemian nobility in Vienna. On 13 May 1743, in Laxenburg he was awarded the title of Bohemian Graf (Count) and on 4 October 1745, in Frankfurt he was elevated to the rank of Reichsgraf (Imperial Count) with heraldic augmentation.

Owner of the Bělušice estate, Václav Chotek also acquired the Veltrusy estate, where architect František Maxmilián Kaňka erected his new residence, the Veltrusy Mansion in 1716. He later also purchased the Domašín estate, becoming one of the richest landowners in Bohemia.

Václav Chotek was head of the Slaný Landkreis (district) and, thereafter, head of the Litoměřice Landkreis. After these assignments, he was appointed Imperial Counsellor. He also held the position of Austrian Stadtholder of the Kingdom of Bohemia from 1735 to 1738.

Václav Chotek died in Prague on 2 May 1754, aged 80. He is buried in Kozly, a village next to Bělušice.
