= Bohuslav, Count Chotek of Chotkow and Wognin =

Bohemian nobleman, landowner and diplomat

Bohuslav
- Count Chotek von Chotkow und Wognin
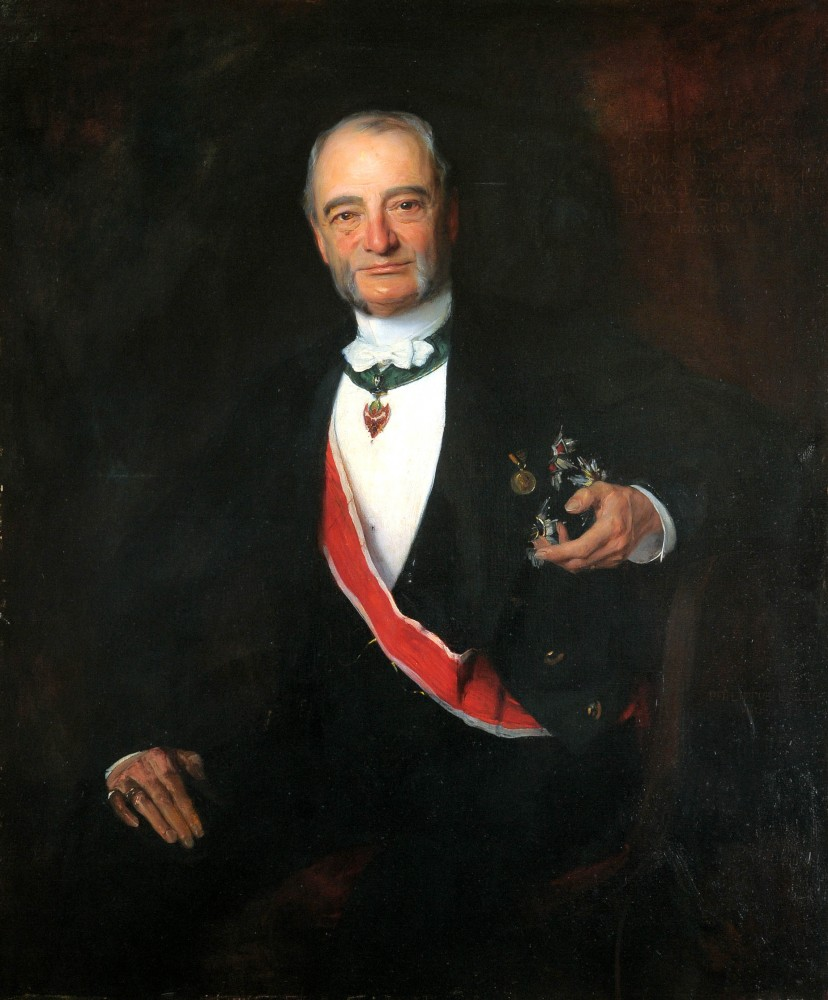
- Count Bohuslav, portrait by Philip de László, 1895
- Born: 4 July 1829; Prague, Kingdom of Bohemia
- Died: 11 October 1896 (aged 67); Görlitz, Kingdom of Prussia
- Noble family: Chotek
- Spouse: Countess Wilhelmine Kinsky von Wchinitz und Tettau (m. 1859; died 1886)
- Issue: Count Wolfgang; Countess Zdenka; Marie, Princess of Thun und Hohenstein; Countess Caroline, Countess von Nostitz-Rieneck; Sophie, Duchess of Hohenberg; Oktavia, Countess von Schönburg-Glauchau und Waldenburg; Maria Antonia, Countess von Wuthenau-Hohenthurm; Countess Henriette, Countess von Nostitz-Rieneck
- Father: Karl, Count Chotek von Chotkow und Wognin
- Mother: Countess Marie Berchtold, Baroness von Ungarschitz

Bohuslav, Count Chotek von Chotkow und Wognin (Czech: Bohuslav hrabě Chotek z Chotkova a Vojnína, German: Bohuslaw Graf Chotek von Chotkow und Wognin; 4 July 1829 – 11 October 1896) was a Bohemian nobleman, landowner, and a diplomat in the service of Austria-Hungary. He was the father of Sophie, Duchess of Hohenberg, the morganatic wife of Archduke Franz Ferdinand of Austria.

== Early life ==
By birth member of an old Bohemian noble House of Chotek, Bohuslav was born in Prague, as the younger son of Karl, Count Chotek von Chotkow und Wognin (1783–1868) and his wife, Countess Marie Berchtold von Ungarschitz (1794–1878). Bohuslav's father was the Governor of Tyrol, Vorarlberg, and Bohemia, and also a founder of the Tyrolean State Museum.

== Career ==
In 1866, Bohuslav became the Austrian ambassador in Stuttgart (Kingdom of Württemberg). In 1869, he became ambassador to St. Petersburg (Russian Empire) and from 1872 in Brussels (Belgium).

== Personal life ==
On 30 October 1859 in Kostelec nad Orlicí, Bohuslav was married to Countess Wilhelmine Kinsky von Wchinitz und Tettau (19 July 1838 – 5 March 1886), elder daughter of Count Joseph Kinsky von Wchinitz und Tettau and Countess Maria Czernin von und zu Chudenitz. They had eight daughters and one son.

- Count Wolfgang Karl Wilhelm Bohuslav Joseph Chotek von Chotkow und Wognin (15 August 1860 – 10 December 1926), who married Anna Elisabeth von Künell-Nedamow (12 April 1871 – 26 December 1922) in 1896.
- Countess Sidonie Zdenka Marie Chotek von Chotkow und Wognin (10 December 1861 – 15 March 1946), who died unmarried.
- Countess Maria Pia Chotek von Chotkow und Wognin (11 July 1863 – 21 June 1935), who married Jaroslav, 2nd Prince von Thun und Hohenstein (23 May 1864 – 5 March 1929) in 1887.
- Countess Karolina Kara Chotek von Chotkow und Wognin (19 November 1865 – 29 November 1919), who married Count Leopold von Nostitz-Rieneck (8 July 1865 – 5 October 1945) in 1886.
- Countess Sophie Maria Josephine Albina Chotek von Chotkow und Wognin (1 March 1868 – 28 June 1914), who married morganatically Archduke Franz Ferdinand of Austria (18 December 1863 – 28 June 1914) in 1900.
- Countess Theresia Chotek von Chotkow und Wognin (22 May 1871 – 19 September 1871).
- Countess Oktavia Maria Josephine Karolina Chotek von Chotkow und Wognin (5 May 1873 – 29 November 1946), who married Joachim, Count of Schönburg-Glauchau (20 July 1873 – 3 July 1943) in 1898.
- Countess Maria Antonia Josefa Karolina Sophie Bonifacia Nepomucena Chotek von Chotkow und Wognin (12 May 1874 – 23 June 1930), who married Carl, Count von Wuthenau-Hohenthurm (26 June 1863 – 13 November 1946) in 1893.
- Countess Marie Henriette Leopoldine Chotek von Chotkow und Wognin (9 July 1880 – 19 March 1964), who married her brother in law, Count Leopold von Nostitz-Rieneck (8 July 1865 – 5 October 1945) in 1921.

=== Descendants ===
Through his daughter Oktavia, he was a great-great-great grand father of Gloria von Thurn und Taxis, mother of the current head of the house Albert von Thurn und Taxis.

== Honours and awards ==
- (Austrian Empire) (Kingdom of Hungary) Austria-Hungary:
  - Grand Cross of the Order of Franz Joseph, 1867
  - Knight of the Iron Crown, 1st Class, 1878
  - Grand Cross of the Imperial Order of Leopold, 1881
- Württemberg:
  - Knight of Honour of the Württemberg Crown, 1853
  - Grand Cross of the Friedrich Order, 1869
- Belgium: Grand Cordon of the Order of Leopold (civil), 24 August 1878
- Kingdom of Prussia: Knight of the Royal Crown Order, 2nd Class, 18 November 1861
- Reuss: Civil Cross of Honour, 1st Class
- Russian Empire:
  - Knight of St. Anna, 1st Class
  - Knight of St. Stanislaus, 2nd Class
- Saxe-Weimar-Eisenach:
  - Grand Cross of the White Falcon, 1892
  - Golden Jubilee Medal
- Kingdom of Saxony: Commander of the Albert Order, 1st Class, 1865
- Spain: Grand Cross of the Order of Charles III, 31 October 1871

== Ancestry ==
Ancestors of Bohuslav, Count Chotek of Chotkow and Wognin

8. Johann Karl, Count Chotek von Chotkow und Wognin
4. Johann Rudolf, Count Chotek von Chotkow und Wognin
9. Countess Anna Maria Kottulinsky von Kottulin und Krzizkowitz
2. Karl, Count Chotek von Chotkow und Wognin
10. Franz Wenzel, 1st Prince von Clary und Aldringen
5. Countess Maria Sidonia von Clary und Aldringen
11. Countess Josepha of Hohenzollern-Hechingen
1. Bohuslav, Count Chotek von Chotkow und Wognin
12. Anton, Count Berchtold von Ungarschitz
6. Anton, Count Berchtold, Baron von Ungarschitz
13. Marie Anna Reviczky von Revisnye
3. Countess Marie Berchtold, Baroness von Ungarschitz
14. Josef Huszár de Szent-Kereszt
7. Marie Anna Franziska Huszár de Szent-Baráth
15. Maria Elisabeth Majláth de Szekhely

Diplomatic posts
Preceded by Baron Maximilian Josef of Handel	Austro-Hungarian Ambassador to Württemberg; 16 December 1866 – 14 October 1869	Succeeded by Baron Otto of Walterskirchen
Preceded by Count Friedrich Revertera of Salandra	Austro-Hungarian Ambassador to Russia; 14 October 1869 – 11 September 1871	Succeeded by Baron Ferdinand of Langenau
Preceded by Count Karl Vitzthum of Eckstädt	Austro-Hungarian Ambassador to Belgium; 22 October 1872 – 24 April 1888	Succeeded by Count Rudolf of Khevenhüller-Metsch
