= Kokorin =

Kokorin (Russian: Коко́рин) is a Russian surname that may refer to:

- Aleksandr Kokorin (born 1991), Russian footballer
- Anton Kokorin (born 1987), Russian sprint athlete
- Nikolay Kokorin (1889–1917), Russian military aviator

== See also ==
- Kokořín
- Kokořín Castle
