= Šlapanice (Kladno District) =

- Municipality
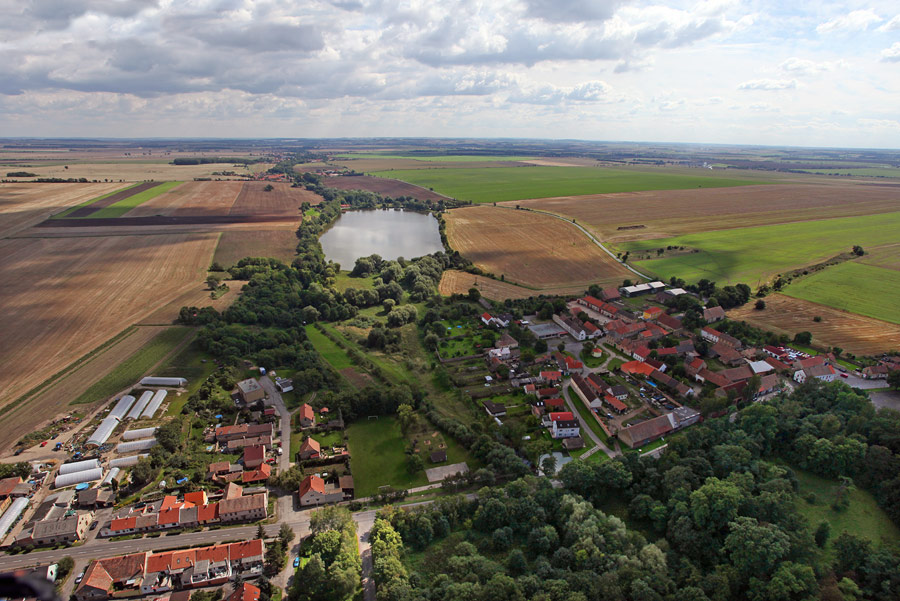
- Aerial view

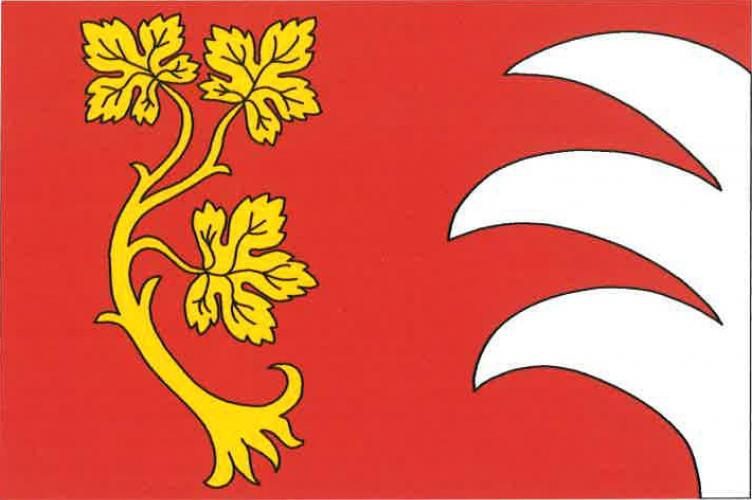
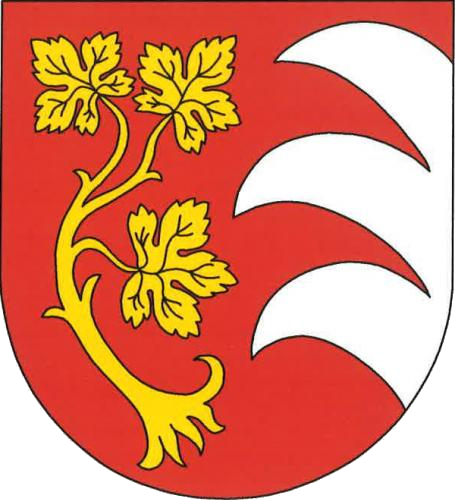
- Flag Coat of arms

- Location in the Czech Republic
- Coordinates: 50°18′53″N 14°6′41″E
- Country: Czech Republic
- Region: Central Bohemian
- District: Kladno
- First mentioned: 1318

Area
  - Total: 6.89 km^{2} (2.66 sq mi)
- Elevation: 214 m (702 ft)

Population (2026-01-01)
  - Total: 206
  - Density: 29.9/km^{2} (77.4/sq mi)
- Time zone: UTC+1 (CET)
  - Summer (DST): UTC+2 (CEST)
- Postal code: 273 72
- Website: www.obecslapanice.cz

Šlapanice is a municipality and village in Kladno District in the Central Bohemian Region of the Czech Republic. It has about 200 inhabitants.

== Administrative division ==
Šlapanice consists of two municipal parts (in brackets population according to the 2021 census):

- Šlapanice (137)
- Budeničky (63)

== Etymology ==
The name is derived from the personal name Šlapan, meaning "the village of Šlapan's people".

== Geography ==
Šlapanice is located about 18 kilometres (11 mi) north of Kladno and 31 km (19 mi) northwest of Prague. It lies in an undulating agricultural landscape in the Lower Ohře Table. The highest point is at 278 m (912 ft) above sea level. The stream Vranský potok flows through the municipality and supplies a fishpond in the village.

== History ==
The first written mention of both Šlapanice and Budeničky is from 1318. Among the most notable owners of Šlapanice were Adam von Waldstein and the Kinsky family.

== Demographics ==
Historical population

Year	Pop.	±%
1869	279	—
1880	379	+35.8%
1890	426	+12.4%
1900	472	+10.8%
1910	483	+2.3%

Year	Pop.	±%
1921	511	+5.8%
1930	433	−15.3%
1950	340	−21.5%
1961	364	+7.1%
1970	327	−10.2%

Year	Pop.	±%
1980	356	+8.9%
1991	332	−6.7%
2001	194	−41.6%
2011	221	+13.9%
2021	200	−9.5%

Source: Censuses

== Transport ==
There are no railways or major roads passing through the municipality.

== Sights ==
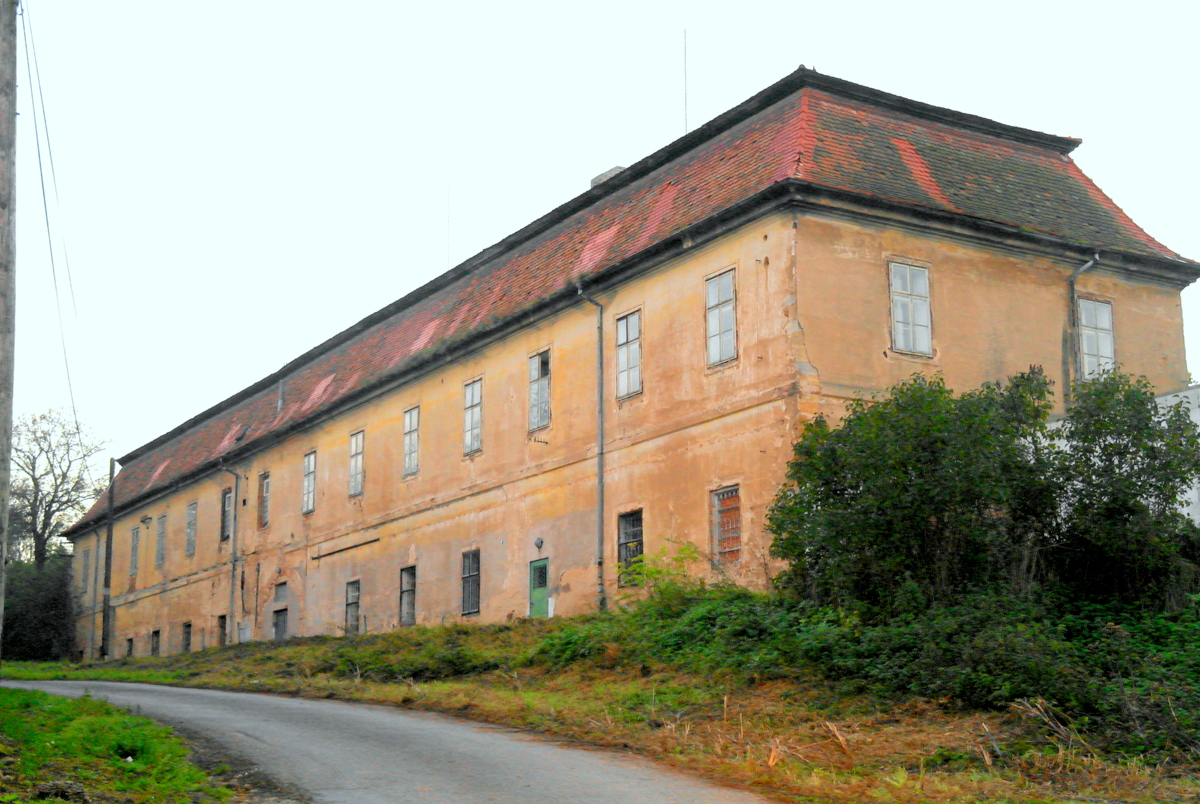
Budeničky Castle

The main landmark of the municipality is the Budeničky Castle. It is a large complex of several buildings, gradually built from the early Baroque period at the end of the 17th century until the Neoclassical period at the end of the 18th century. Next to the castle is a large park. Today the castle is inaccessible and unused.
