= Karl, Count Chotek of Chotkow and Wognin =

Czech nobleman

Karl
- Count Chotek of Chotkow and Wognin
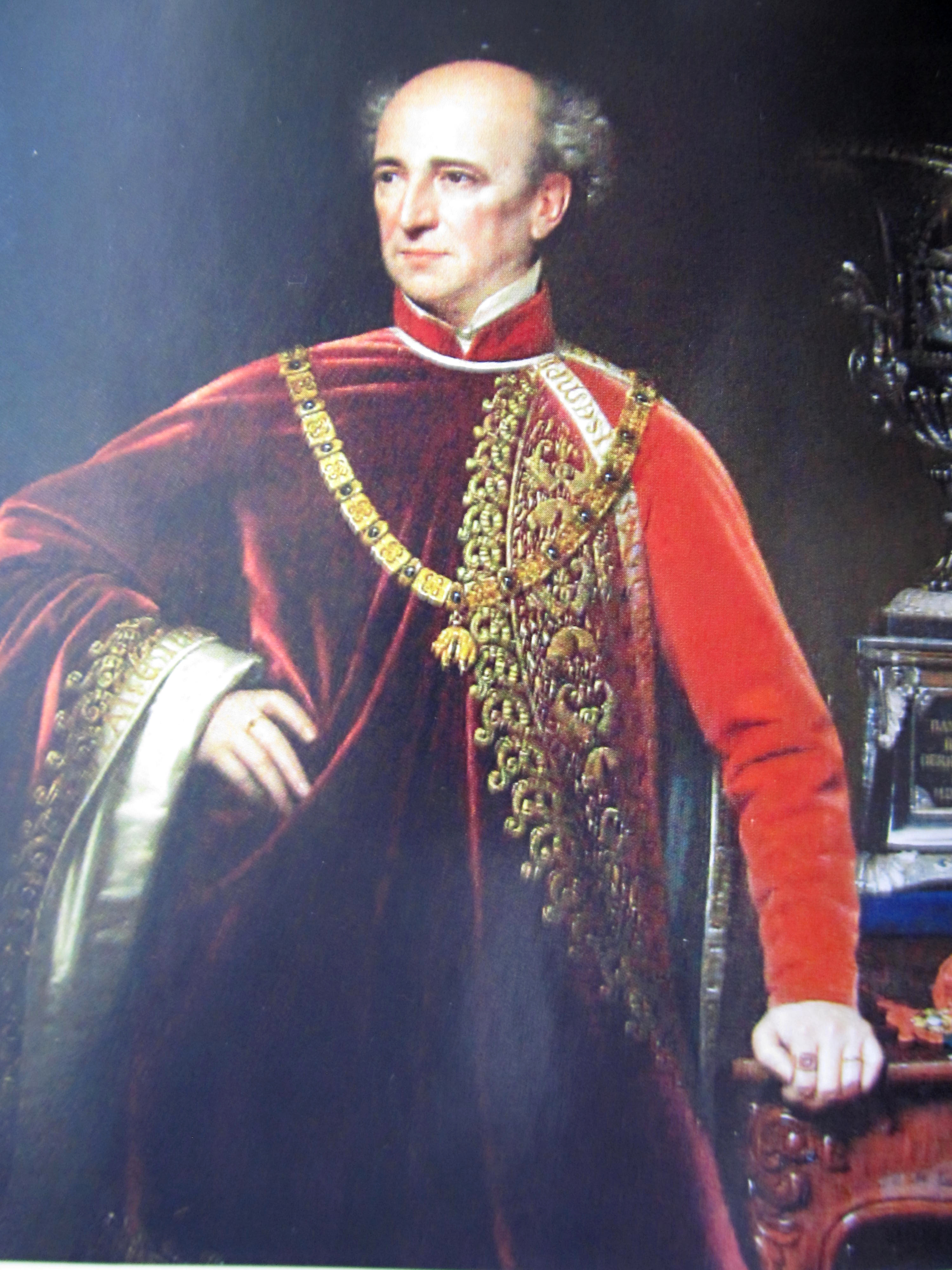
- Portrait by Heinrich Hollpein
- Full name: Karl
- Born: 23 July 1783; Vienna, Habsburg monarchy
- Died: 18 December 1868 (aged 85); Vienna, Austria-Hungary
- Noble family: Chotek
- Spouses: Countess Marie Berchtold, Baroness of Ungarschitz
- Issue: Count Anton; Bohuslav, Count Chotek of Chotkow and Wognin
- Father: Johann Rudolf, Count Chotek of Chotkow and Wognin
- Mother: Countess Maria Sidonia of Clary and Aldringen

Karl, Count Chotek of Chotkow and Wognin (Czech: Karel hrabě Chotek z Chotkova a Vojnína, German: Karl Graf Chotek von Chotkow und Wognin); (23 July 1783 – 18 December 1868) was an Austrian chancellor, Government President (Gubernialpräsident) and school reformer of Bohemia and honorary citizen of Innsbruck and Prague.

== Life and education ==
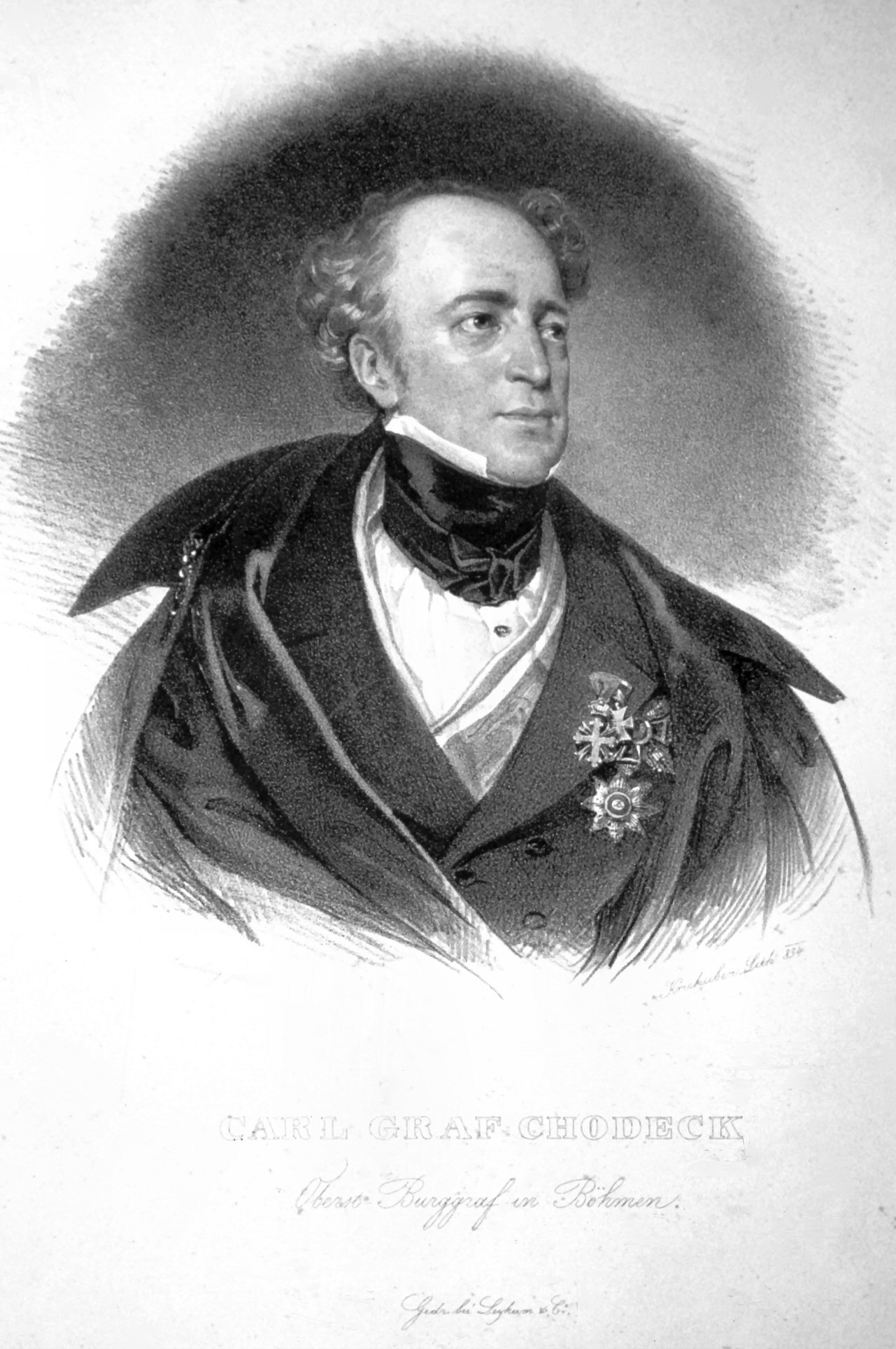
Lithograph by Josef Kriehuber

Karl was born at Vienna, Habsburg monarchy, the sixth child and fifth son of Johann Rudolf, Count Chotek of Chotkow and Wognin (1748–1824) and Countess Maria Sidonia of Clary und Aldringen (1748–1824).

Karl Graf Chotek studied law in Vienna and Prague. In 1803 he joined the civil service. From 1809 he was senior administrative posts in Moravia and successfully reorganized the Trieste district office, which is why in 1815 after the defeat of Joachim Murat he became governor-general in the Kingdom of Naples. Between 1817-18 he was the governor of the Kingdom of Ilyria.

== Governor of Tyrol and Vorarlberg ==
In 1818, he came a Privy Councillor and Vice President for Tyrol, where he was governor of Tyrol and Vorarlberg in 1819.

Together with the mayor of the city of Innsbruck, Felix Adam of Riccabona, in 1822 he initiated the founding of the "Sparkasse Innsbruck" (now Tiroler Sparkasse) as the second bank in Austria (after the First Austrian Savings Bank).

In memory of its co-founder, the Tiroler Sparkasse awards the "Count Chotek University Award", awarded for a very good degree and master's thesis.

As state governor, he founded in Innsbruck a committee to establish a "Patriotic Museum for Tyrol", which later became the Tyrolean State Museum also known as the Ferdinandeum. As early as 1800, Archduke John had had the idea of this epochal project - as a "collection of all provincial products, which should serve as a model for the rest of the hereditary states". As a result of the Napoleonic Wars, it was not established until 1823, a decade after the Universalmuseum Joanneum was opened in Styria.

Already the first statutes of the new institution had advanced content, "the progressive formation of the nation in general and in detail, especially the awakening and revival of interest, the products of nature, art and antiquity... " and the publication of a science-based journal. This purpose definition went beyond the romantic-historical notions of the Biedermeier period and far beyond, all conditions of the Tyrolean crown land collected, organized, and made for the future.

Social policy was significant with the introduction of fire insurance, which under Emperor Joseph II had not caused it to prevail. Karl supported the efforts of Baron Josef of Giovanelli (1784–1845) to establish a nonprofit institute, which took place in February 1825. For this he was made the first honorary citizen of Innsbruck in 1825.

== Governor of Bohemia ==
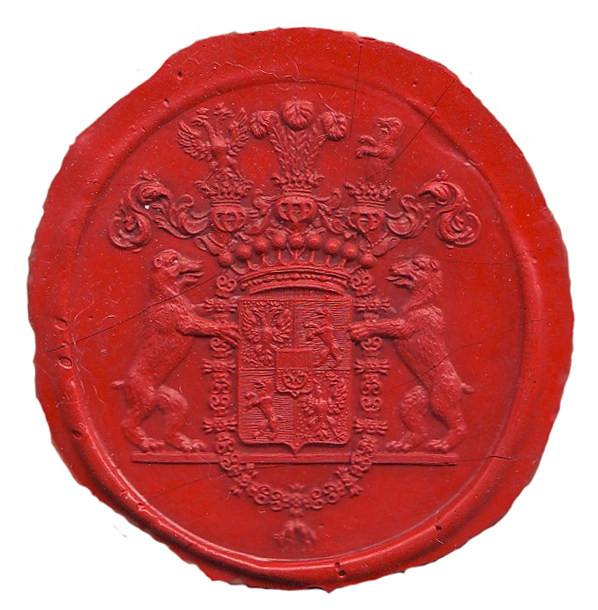
The Supreme Burgrave of the Bohemia Kingdom authoritative wafer, 1836

Karl's achievements in cultural policy led him being called to Vienna in 1825 as Chancellor and President of the Collegial Body for Academic Affairs. In October 1826 he was elected Supreme Burggrave, Senior Viscount and Imperial Government President of the Kingdom of Bohemia in Prague. He held this office until 1843 and gained recognition for the promotion of education, road construction and the establishment of institutions to help and care for poor people.

In Prague, Karl learned history and politics from František Palacký, with whom he had a close friendship until Palacky's death. Palacký taught Karl the Czech language which he mastered.

Count Karl worked energetically and purposefully in Prague Castle as a Colonel Count. He worked on improving infrastructure, especially in the construction of good roads and bridges. He also advocated for the first horsecar in Prague, a steamboat trip on the River Elbe (Labe), and the expansion of Prague's sewage system and street lighting. He supported the development of industry, education and the arts. In 1827, he wrote an important decree stating that the export of historically-valuable art objects required the approval of the provincial administration.

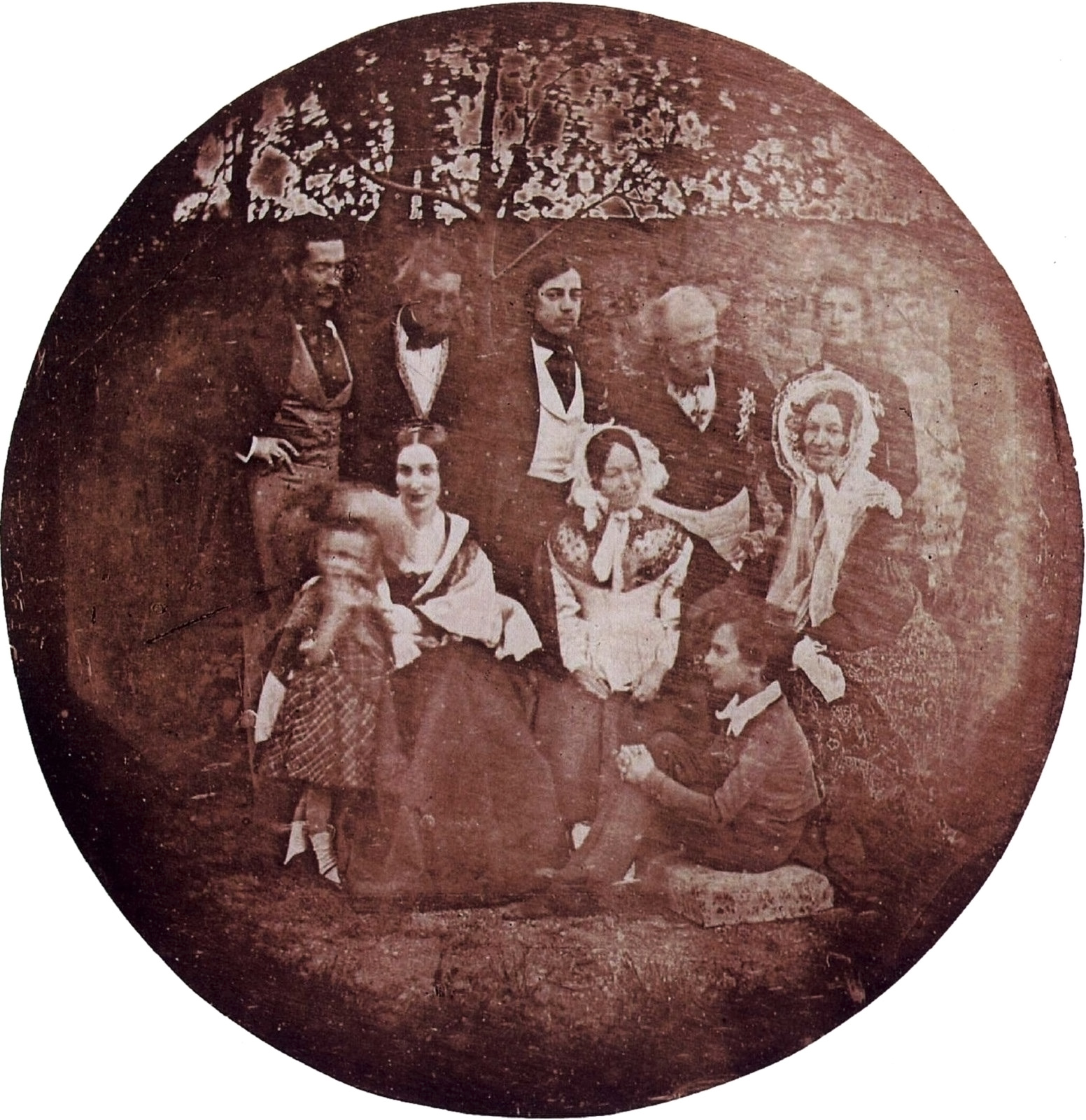
The oldest Czech photograph, a group picture of the Chotek family, taken in 1839.

One of the most popular destinations for walkers - the popular garden between the rear part of Prague Castle and Malá Strana - was named after Viscount Chotek in 1840.

In 1842, in Prague, Karl was made an honorary citizen for his services. Through intrigue and sometimes criticism of his expensive projects, he was later forced to resign. At the end of July 1843 he was relieved at his request, living at Březno Castle in northern Bohemia. He died on 28 December 1868 in Vienna, but was buried in Waltire at Litoměřice.

== Marriage and family ==
Karl was married on 9 June 1817 in Vienna to Countess Marie Berchtold zu Ungarschitz (1794–1878), elder daughter of Count Anton Berchtold zu Ungarschitz (1754-1819) and his wife, Marie Anna Franziska Huszár de Szent-Baráth (1771-1847).

They had two sons:

- Count Anton Chotek of Chotkow and Wognin (27 March 1822 – 1 June 1883), married Countess Olga Friederike Leontine von Moltke in 1851; had issue.
- Bohuslav, Count Chotek of Chotkow and Wognin (3 July 1829 – 11 October 1896), married Countess Wilhelmine Kinsky von Wchinitz und Tettau in 1859; had issue.

== Orders and decorations ==
- Knight of the Golden Fleece, 1836
- Grand Cross of the Imperial Order of Leopold

== Ancestry ==
Ancestors of Karl, Count Chotek of Chotkow and Wognin

8. Count Wenzel Chotek of Chotkow and Wognin
4. Johann Karl, Count Chotek of Chotkow and Wognin
9. Maria Theresa Scheidler of Scheidlen
2. Johann Rudolf, Count Chotek of Chotkow and Wognin
10. Count Franz Carl Kottulinsky of Kottulin and Krizkowitz
5. Countess Anna Maria Kottulinsky of Kottulin and Krzizkowitz
11. Countess Maria Antonia of Rottal
1. Karl, Count Chotek of Chotkow and Wognin
12. Count Franz Karl of Clary and Aldringen
6. Franz Wenzel, 1st Prince of Clary and Aldringen
13. Countess Maria Theresa Kunigl of Ehrenburg and Warth
3. Countess Maria Sidonia of Clary and Aldringen
14. Count Hermann Friedrich of Hohenzollern-Hechingen
7. Countess Josepha of Hohenzollern-Hechingen
15. Countess Maria Josefa of Oettingen-Spielberg

== Notes and sources ==
- Genealogisches Handbuch des Adels, Fürstliche Häuser, Reference: 1980 480
- Chotek Karl Graf . In: Austrian Biographical Dictionary 1815-1950 (ABL). Volume 1, published by the Austrian Academy of Sciences, Vienna 1957, p. 146
- Wolf: Chotek . In: General German Biography (ADB). Volume 4, Duncker & Humblot, Leipzig 1876, p. 138 (Familienartikel) (Family products)
- Frederick Walter Chotek, Carl . In: New German Biography (NDB). Volume 3, Duncker & Humblot, Berlin 1957, p. 214 f.
- Adam Wolf : Karl Graf Chotek, Graz / Prague 1869
- Josef Bedr: Hrabata Chotkové z Chotkova a Vojnína, Kutná Hora 1886
- Baron Roman Prochazka : Genealogical Handbook extinct Mr. Bohemian-class families, page 59, Verlag Degener & Co, Neustadt (Aisch) 1973
- Chotek of Chotkowna and Wognin, Count Karl, into at Constant von Wurzbach, Biographical Encyclopedia of the Empire of Austria, second Band 1857. Band 1857th
