= Supreme Burgrave of the Kingdom of Bohemia =

Former Czech political position

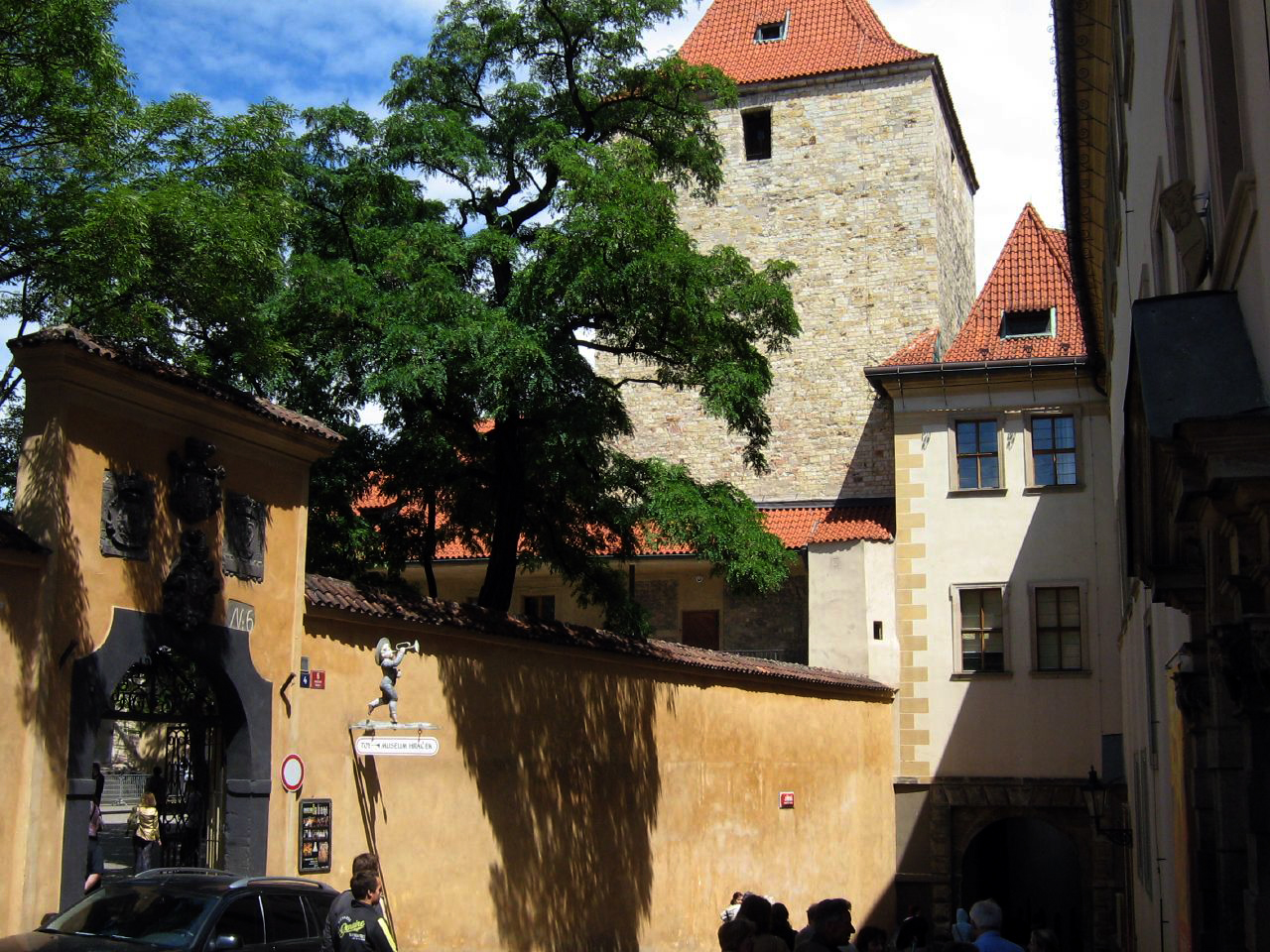
Staré purkrabství in Prague Castle

The Supreme Burgrave of the Kingdom of Bohemia, originally the Burgrave of Prague or the Burgrave of Prague Castle (Czech: Nejvyšší purkrabí; German: Oberstburggraf; Latin: supremus burgravius) was the most important land official of the Kingdom of Bohemia. They were the head of the Bohemian Diet and the Bohemian land court, and commander of the Zemská hotovost.

The supreme burgrave was appointed directly by the king, was appointed for life and could only be deposed in exceptional circumstances. The traditional seat of the supreme burgrave was the Staré purkrabství in Prague.

== History ==
In the Crown of the Kingdom of Bohemia, the title of burgrave was given by the King of Bohemia to the chief officer, or the regal official whose command is equivalent to a viceroy's. From the 14th century, the burgrave of Prague—the highest-ranking of all burgraves, seated at Prague Castle, gradually became the state's highest-ranking official, who also acted as the king's deputy; the office became known as the high or supreme burgrave of the Kingdom of Bohemia. After the reforms of Maria Theresa (reign 1740–1780) and her son Joseph II (reign 1780–1790), the title of supreme burgrave gradually lost its de facto power. The title of supreme burgrave was still granted, however, and its holder remained the first officer of the kingdom. It was abolished in 1848.

== List ==
Coat of arms	Name	Term		Additional information
Coat of arms	Name	Start	End	Additional information
	Smil of Lichtenberg	1249	1251/1253	
	Jaroš of Slivno	1253	1264	
	Oldřich Zajíc of Valdek	1265/1267	1269	
	Zbislav	1271	1272	
	Mstidruh of Chlum	1277	1279	
	Hroznata of Úžice	after 1281	?	Brother-in-law of Záviš of Falkenstein
	Zdislav of Lemberk	1283	1283	
	Hroznata of Choustník	1284	1286/1288	
	Zdeslav III of Šternberk	1288	1289	
	Jan I of Michalovice	1289	1289	
	Beneš I of Vartemberk	1291	1297	
	Jindřich Berka of Dubá	1303	1305	
	Hynek of Dubá	1305	1309	
	Oldřich of Lichtenburg	1313	1314	
	Beneš of Michalovice	1315	1315	
	Hynek Berka of Dubá	1321	1346	
	Hynek Berka the Younger of Dubá	1346	1351	Son of Hynek Berka of Dubá
	William of Landštejn	1351	1356	
	Ješek of Vartemberk and Veselá	1356	1362	Grandson of Beneš I of Vartemberk
	Beneš of Veselí	1364	1366?	Son of Ješek of Vartemberk and Veselá
	Jan I of Vartemberk	1366	1378	Great-grandson of Beneš I of Vartemberk
	Petr of Vartemberk	1381	1386	Great-grandson of Beneš I of Vartemberk
	Otto III of Bergau	1388	1394	
	Burchard Strnad of Janovice	?	1396	
	Henry III of Rosenberg	1396	1398	First term
	Henry III of Hradec	1398	1398	
	Henry III of Rosenberg	1400	1403	Second term
	Jan Krušina of Lichtenburg	1403	1407	
	Albrecht Lukowski of Šternberk	1407	?	
	Jan the Younger of Hradec	1411	1413	
	Čenek of Vartenberk	1414	1420	
	Oldřich II of Rosenberg	1431	?	
	Meinhard of Neuhaus	1437	1448	
	Zdeněk of Šternberk	1448	1467	
	Zdeněk Kostka of Postupice	1467	1468	
	Mareš of Švamberk	1485	1487	
	Wolfgang I Krajíř of Kraik	?	1499	
	Jan Jenec of Janovice and Petršpurka	?	1502	
	Henry IV of Neuhaus	1502	1507	
	Zdeněk Lev of Rožmitál	1507	1523	First term
	Jan of Vartemberk	1523	1525	First term
	Zdeněk Lev of Rožmitál	1525	1530	Second term
	Jan of Vartemberk	1530	1542	Second term
	Volf the Elder Krajíř of Krajek	1542	1554	
	Jan IV Popel of Lobkowitz	1554	1570	
	William of Rosenberg	1570	1592	
	Adam II of Hradec	1592	1596	
	Adam II of Šternberk	1608	1619	First term
	Bohuchval Berka of Dubé	1619	1620	
	Adam II of Šternberk	1620	1623	Second term
	Adam of Valdštejn	1627	1638	
	Jaroslav Bořita of Martinice	1638	1649	
	František Oldřich Libštejnský of Kolovrat	1649	1650	
	Bernard Ignaz of Martinice	1651	1685	
	Adolf Vratislav of Šternberk	1685	1703	
	Heřman Jakub Černín	1704	1710	
	Jan Josef of Vrtby	1712	1734	
	Jan Arnošt Antonín Schaffgotsch	1734	1747	
	Filip Nerius Krakovský of Kolovrat	1748	1771	
	Karel Egon I of Fürstenberg	1771	1782	
	František Antonín Nostic-Rieneck	1782	1787	
	Ludvík Cavriani	1787	1791	
	Jindřich František of Rottenhann	1791	1792	
	Prokop Lažanský of Buková	1792	1794	
	František Václav Kager of Štampach	1794	1802	
	Johann Rudolf, Count Chotek of Chotkow and Wognin	1802	1808	
	Josef Wallis	1808	1810	
	Franz Anton von Kolowrat-Liebsteinsky	1811	1826	
	Karl, Count Chotek of Chotkow and Wognin	1826	1843	

== See also ==
- Supreme Marshal of the Kingdom of Bohemia
- High Chancellor of Bohemia
