= Adam von Waldstein =

Czech nobleman

Adam von Waldstein the Younger
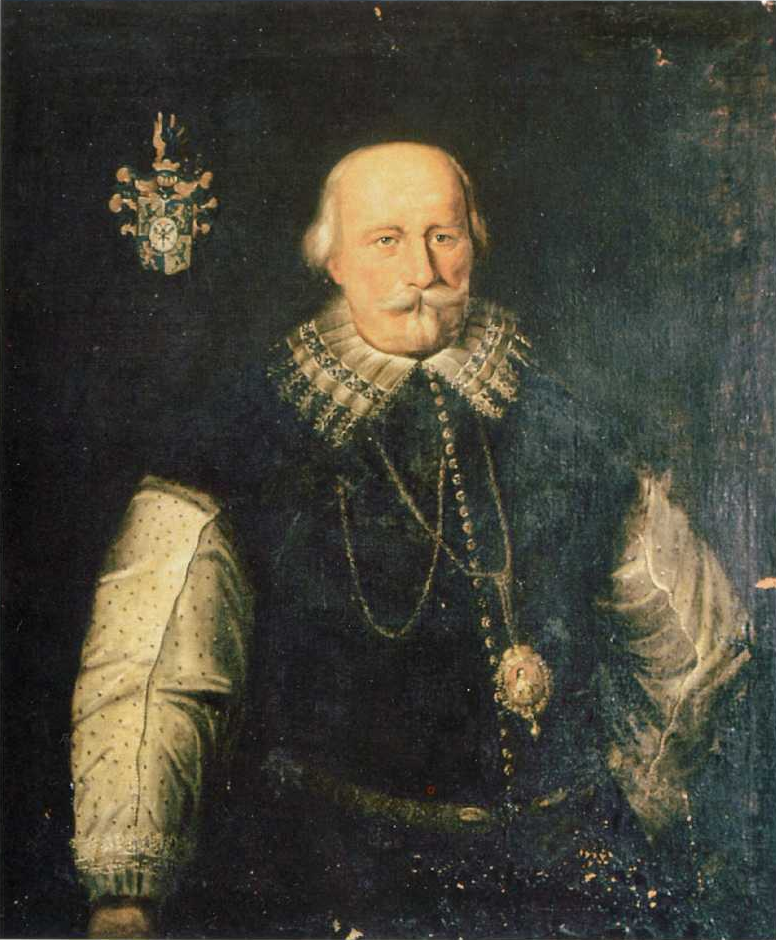

Supreme Burgrave of the Kingdom of Bohemia
- In office 1627–1638
- Monarchs: Ferdinand II; Ferdinand III
- Succeeded by: Jaroslav Bořita of Martinice

Oberstlandhofmeister of the Kingdom of Bohemia
- In office 1627–1620
- Monarch: Ferdinand II
- Preceded by: Vilém Popel of Lobkowicz
- Succeeded by: Vilém Slavata of Chlum
- In office 1619 – 18 June 1611
- Monarch: Matthias
- Preceded by: Ferdinand of Donín
- Succeeded by: Vilém Popel of Lobkowicz

Oberstlandrichter of the Kingdom of Bohemia
- In office 1611–1608
- Monarch: Rudolf II
- Preceded by: Wolfgang Kolowrat

Ober-Stallmeister of the imperial court
- In office 1611?–1606
- Preceded by: Wolfgang Kolowrat

Imperial butler
- In office 1596–?
- Monarch: Rudolf II

Supreme silversmith
- In office 1594–?
- Monarch: Rudolf II

Emperor's food carrier
- In office 1589–?
- Monarch: Rudolf II

Personal details
- Born: 1596/8 June 1570
- Died: 24 August 1638 Prague, Habsburg monarchy
- Resting place: St. Vitus Cathedral
- Spouse(s): Elisabeth Brtnická von Waldstein; Johanna Emilie of Zierotin
- Children: Rudolf; Maximilian; Bertold; Jan Viktorin; Karl
- Parent(s): Johann von Waldstein; Magdalena of Vartenberg
- Awards: Order of the Golden Fleece

Adam von Waldstein the Younger, nicknamed the Long (1569/8 June 1570 – 24 August 1638), was a Czech nobleman, the supreme Prague burgrave from the Waldstein family. His preserved diary is an important historical source.

== Family ==
His parents were Johann von Waldstein (died 1576) and his second wife Magdalena of Vartenberg (died 1592). Like his father, Adam the Younger was married twice. His first wife was Elisabeth Brtnická von Waldstein (died 1614). His second wife was Johanna Emilie of Zierotin (died after 1633), the daughter of Viktorin of Zierotin. He had five sons with both wives: Rudolf, Maximilian, Bertold, Jan Viktorin and Karl.

== Life ==
Coat of arms of the House of Waldstein

He came from an old Utraquist family but soon converted to Catholicism. He received a below-average education, but this did not prevent him from achieving considerable career success. He first established himself at the Rudolfinian court, where he became the Ober-Stallmeister in 1606, from 1608 served as the Oberstlandrichter, and in 1611 was promoted to the Oberstlandhofmeister. Adam gained a reputation as a conciliatory politician, a "man of compromise", which was evident both during the negotiations for the Letter of Majesty in 1609 and in the troubled times of 1611. The period of the estate uprising of 1618–1620 was an important test. He unsuccessfully tried to find common ground between the Estates and King Ferdinand II. After that, he went into exile in Saxony after the election of Frederick of the Palatinate as King of Bohemia. After returning to Bohemia in 1621, Adam also participated in the purchase of confiscated estates and once again became Oberstlandhofmeister. At the same time, he acted in some cases in favour of his Protestant relatives. In 1627, he reached the pinnacle of his career in the office of Supreme Burgrave.

Although he never acquired such a magnificent fortune as his more famous relative Albrecht von Wallenstein (1583–1634), given that he managed to preserve the property for posterity, Adam's inheritance represented a crucial foundation for the family in the future.

== Literature ==
- von Waldstein, Adam (1997). Deník rudolfinského dvořana : Adam mladší z Valdštejna 1602-1633 (in Czech). Prague: Argo. ISBN 80-7203-170-8.
