= Veltrusy =

- Town
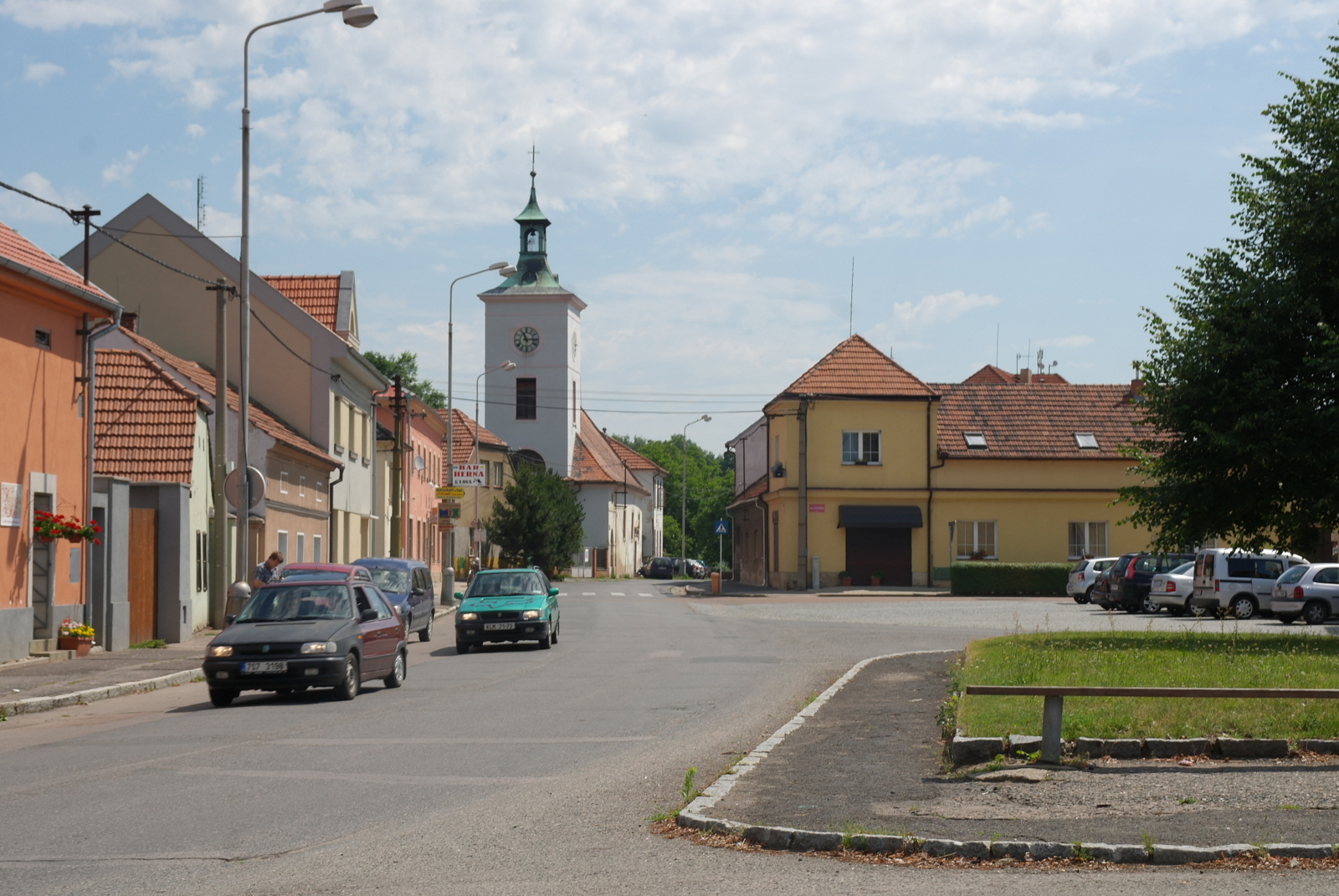
- A. Dvořáka Square with the Church of Saint John the Baptist

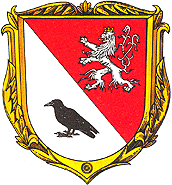
- Coat of arms

- Location in the Czech Republic
- Coordinates: 50°16′14″N 14°19′43″E
- Country: Czech Republic
- Region: Central Bohemian
- District: Mělník
- First mentioned: 1226

Government
  - Mayor: Filip Volák

Area
  - Total: 8.01 km^{2} (3.09 sq mi)
- Elevation: 172 m (564 ft)

Population (2026-01-01)
  - Total: 2,328
  - Density: 291/km^{2} (753/sq mi)
- Time zone: UTC+1 (CET)
  - Summer (DST): UTC+2 (CEST)
- Postal code: 277 46
- Website: www.veltrusy.cz

Veltrusy (Czech pronunciation: [ˈvɛltrusɪ]; German: Weltrus) is a town in Mělník District in the Central Bohemian Region of the Czech Republic. It has about 2,300 inhabitants. The town is located on the Vltava River in the Central Elbe Table. Veltrusy is known for the Veltrusy Mansion, protected as a national cultural monument.

== Etymology ==
The name of the settlement arose from a derogatory designation of its inhabitants. The word veltrusi was used to refer to people who excreted a lot (in Czech velmi trousili).

== Geography ==
Veltrusy is located about 19 kilometres (12 mi) north of Prague. It lies in the Central Elbe Table. The highest point of the otherwise flat landscape is an artificially created rubble hill, Strachovská halda at 222 m (728 ft) above sea level. The town is situated on the right bank of the Vltava River.

== History ==
The first trustworthy written mention of Veltrusy is in a deed of King Ottokar I from 1226, but according to some sources there are also older references. Until 1410, the village was owned by the church, then it was property of various noble families, including Zajíc of Hazmburk, Smiřický, Lobkowicz and Waldstein. From the 17th century until 1945, Veltrusy was owned by the Chotek family.

Veltrusy was promoted to a market town in 1899 and to a town in 1926, but soon lost the title. In 1994, it was again promoted to a town.

== Demographics ==
Historical population

Year	Pop.	±%
1869	900	—
1880	1,051	+16.8%
1890	1,134	+7.9%
1900	1,397	+23.2%
1910	1,519	+8.7%

Year	Pop.	±%
1921	1,548	+1.9%
1930	1,781	+15.1%
1950	1,950	+9.5%
1961	2,029	+4.1%
1970	2,012	−0.8%

Year	Pop.	±%
1980	1,675	−16.7%
1991	1,502	−10.3%
2001	1,560	+3.9%
2011	1,944	+24.6%
2021	2,280	+17.3%

Source: Censuses

== Transport ==
There are no railways or major roads running through the municipal territory. However, Veltrusy is located near the D8 motorway from Prague to Ústí nad Labem.

== Sights ==
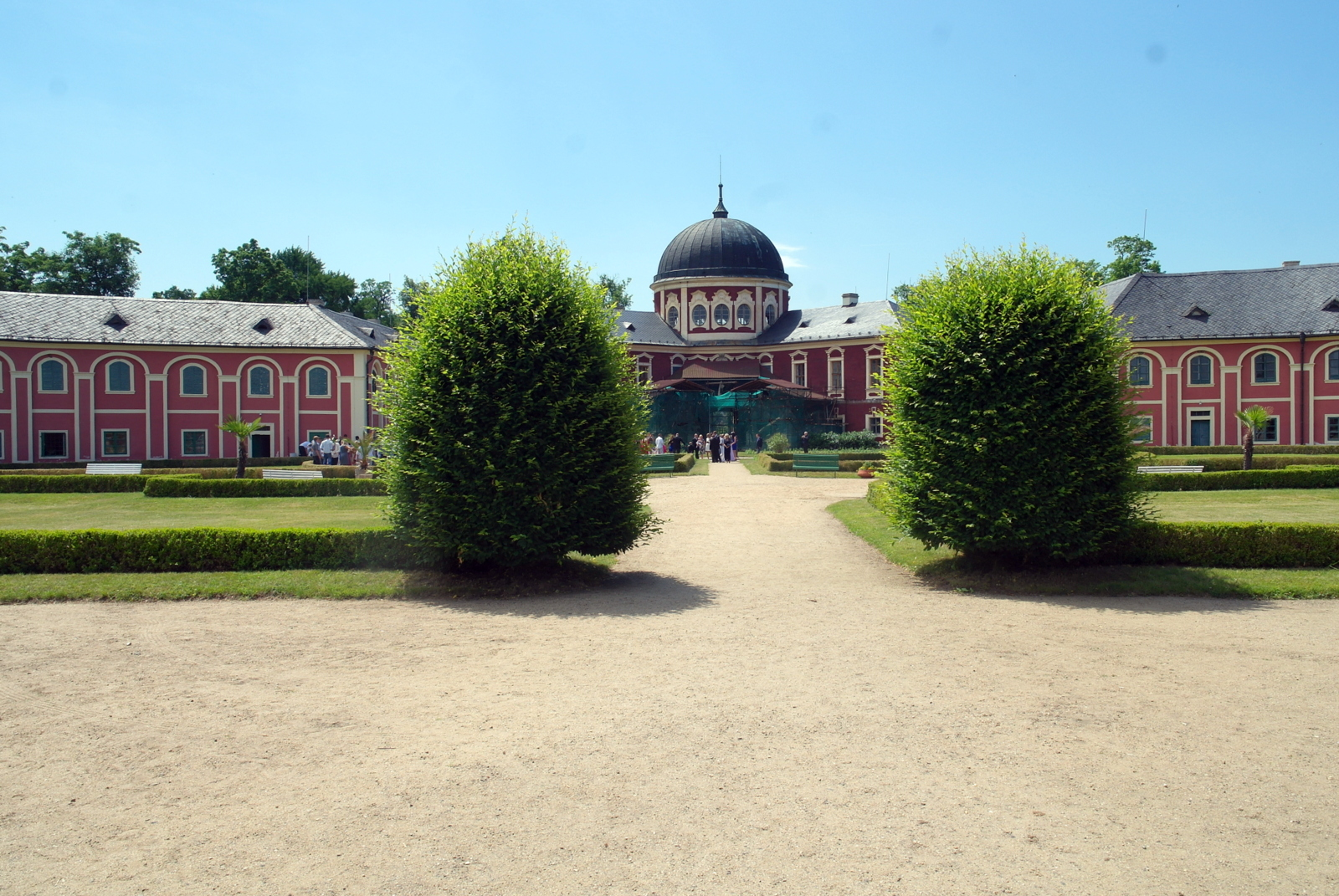
Veltrusy Mansion

The most important monument and tourist destination of the town is the Veltrusy Mansion. It was built in the Baroque style in 1706. The castle is surrounded with a large castle park and a with deer park focused on European fallow deer. Today the castle is owned by the state, is open to the public and offers guided tours. It is one of the most valuable buildings of the Baroque and Rococo periods in Bohemia and is protected as a national cultural monument.

The Church of Saint John the Baptist was built in the 14th century and rebuilt in the Baroque style in the 18th century. At the beginning of the 20th century, the Neoclassical tower was added. The interior is mostly in the Rococo style. A distinctive element of the interior of the church is the cenotaph of Count Rudolf Chotek.
