= Bělušice (Most District) =

- Municipality
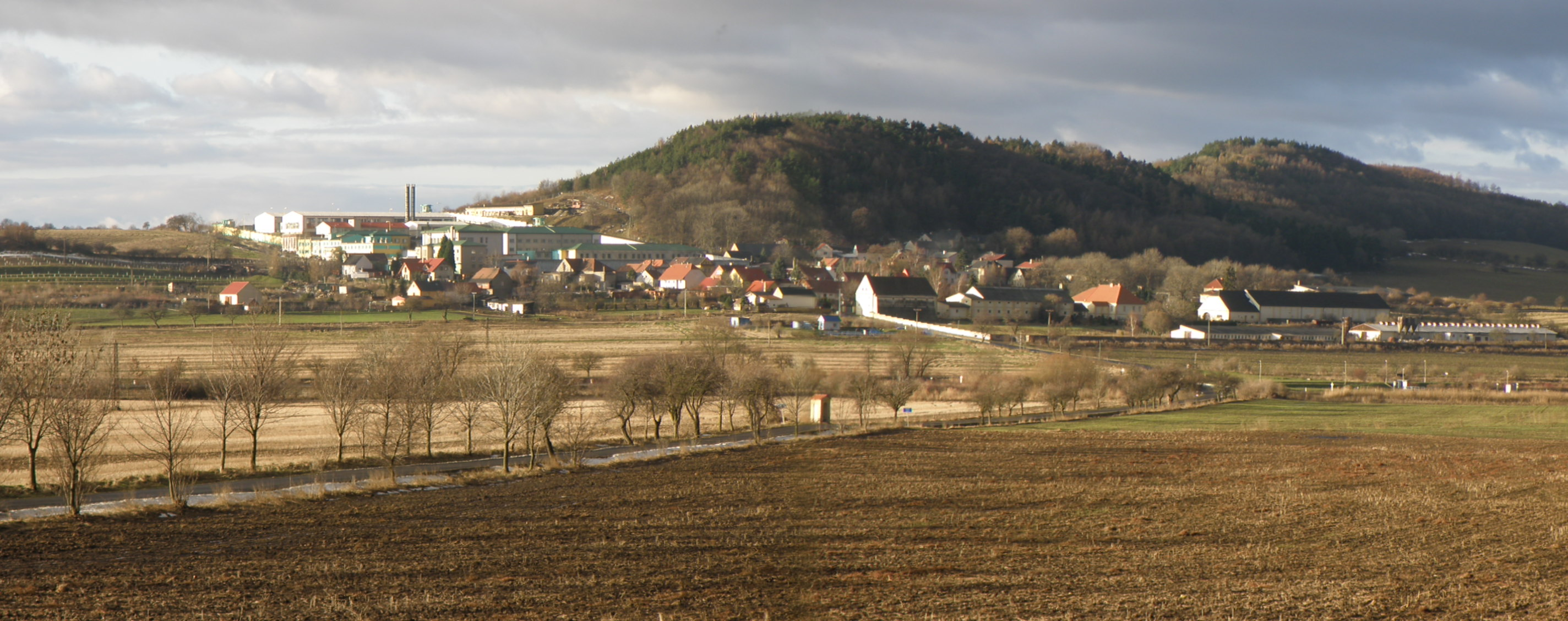
- Panorama of Bělušice

- Flag Coat of arms

- Location in the Czech Republic
- Coordinates: 50°26′57″N 13°45′46″E
- Country: Czech Republic
- Region: Ústí nad Labem
- District: Most
- First mentioned: 1231

Area
  - Total: 10.82 km^{2} (4.18 sq mi)
- Elevation: 333 m (1,093 ft)

Population (2026-01-01)
  - Total: 227
  - Density: 21.0/km^{2} (54.3/sq mi)
- Time zone: UTC+1 (CET)
  - Summer (DST): UTC+2 (CEST)
- Postal code: 434 01
- Website: www.belusice.cz

Bělušice (German: Bieloschitz) is a municipality and village in Most District in the Ústí nad Labem Region of the Czech Republic. It has about 200 inhabitants.

Bělušice lies approximately 11 kilometres (7 mi) south-east of Most, 31 km (19 mi) south-west of Ústí nad Labem, and 62 km (39 mi) north-west of Prague.

== Administrative division ==
Bělušice consists of three municipal parts (in brackets population according to the 2021 census):

- Bělušice (709)
- Bedřichův Světec (28)
- Odolice (61)

== Demographics ==
Historical population
Year	Pop.	±%
1869	604	—
1880	614	+1.7%
1890	616	+0.3%
1900	682	+10.7%
1910	687	+0.7%
1921	655	−4.7%
1930	650	−0.8%
1950	344	−47.1%
1961	304	−11.6%
1970	272	−10.5%
1980	249	−8.5%
1991	179	−28.1%
2001	188	+5.0%
2011	895	+376.1%
2021	798	−10.8%
Source: Censuses

== Notable people ==
- Václav Antonín Chotek of Chotkov and Vojnín (1674–1754), nobleman and politician
