= Václav Bolemír Nebeský =

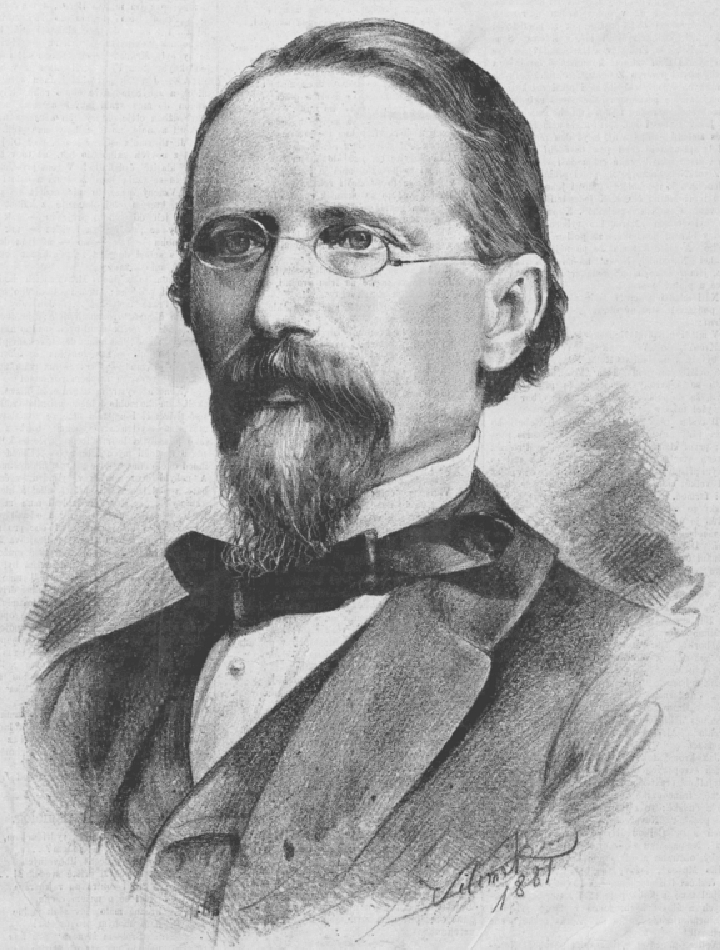
- Born: 18 August 1818; Nový Dvůr, Kokořín, Kingdom of Bohemia, Austrian Empire
- Died: 17 August 1882 (aged 63); Prague, Kingdom of Bohemia, Cisleithania, Austro-Hungarian Monarchy
- Resting place: Vyšehrad cemetery, Prague (now in the Czech Republic)
- Education: Charles University
- Occupations: Poet, politician
- Writing career
- Language: Czech, Latin, German, Greek, Spanish
- Notable work: Protichůdci

Václav Bolemír Nebeský (17 August 1818 – 17 August 1882) was a Czech poet active during the Czech National Revival.

== Biography ==
Václav Bolemír Nebeský was born at the Nový Dvůr estate in the neighbourhood of Kokořín. He went to high school in Litoměřice. He learned Greek and Latin very well there and this ability helped him to become a translator much later. Then he studied at Charles University in Prague. After 1820 he chose to take the typically Czech name of Bolemír. He spent four years in Vienna, where he worked as a private teacher. When he returned to Prague he continued to be a private educator and worked for the president of the Czech Museum. He cooperated with other important national revival figures, such as Boleslav Jablonský, Josef Kajetán Tyl, Karel Jaromír Erben, Karel Havlíček Borovský and Karel Sabina. He also had an intimate relationship with the famous writer Božena Němcová. He was active during the revolution of 1848, known commonly as the Springtime of Nations. He was elected a deputy at the Austrian Parliament. In 1849 he got tenure at the University but never lectured, working as a journalist. Václav Bolemír Nebeský died in Prague in 1882. He was buried at Vyšehrad cemetery in Prague.

== Works ==
Václav Bolemír Nebeský was a poet and translator. His best-known work is the poem is Protichůdci. The title means "The men, who go in opposite directions". It was published in 1844. The main hero is the Wandering Jew, Ahasver. He is a man weary of life, who longs for death. The hero is probably a symbol of everyone's endeavour and suffering. The poem is written in trochaic pentameter. Nebeský translated many works by ancient authors, for example Aristophanes, Aischylos, Terence and Plautus. He also published anthologies of Jewish legends in 1881.
