= Hynek Berka of Dubá =

Bohemian knight (d. 1348)

Hynek Berka of Dubá (Czech: Hynek Berka z Dubé; c. 1297 – 1348) was a Bohemian knight and founder of the Berka of Dubá aristocracy line. In 1320 he had the Kokořín Castle built.

== Relatives ==
- Adam Berka of Dubá
- Zbyněk Berka of Dubá
