= Chotek family =

Czech noble family

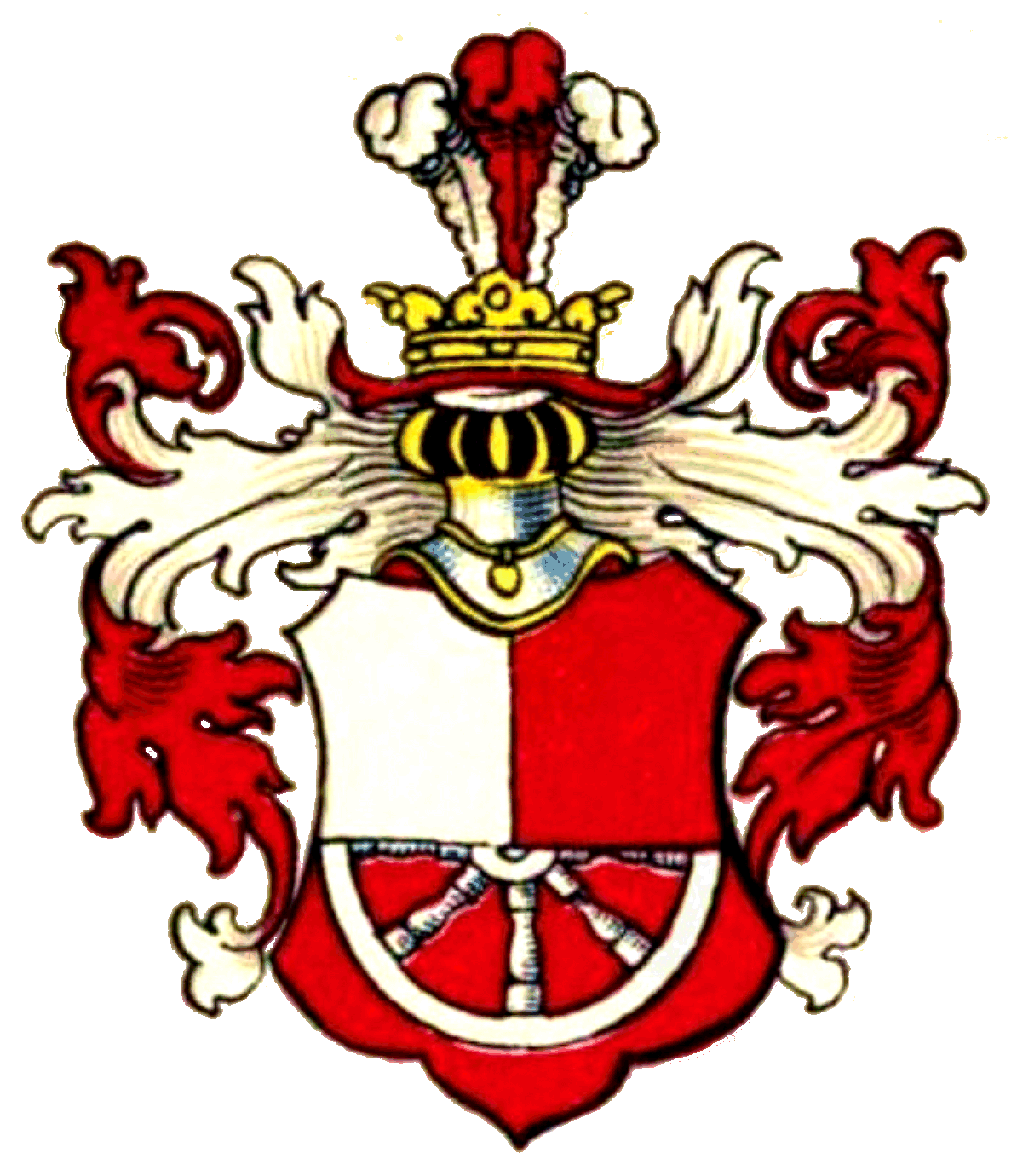
The original arms of the family

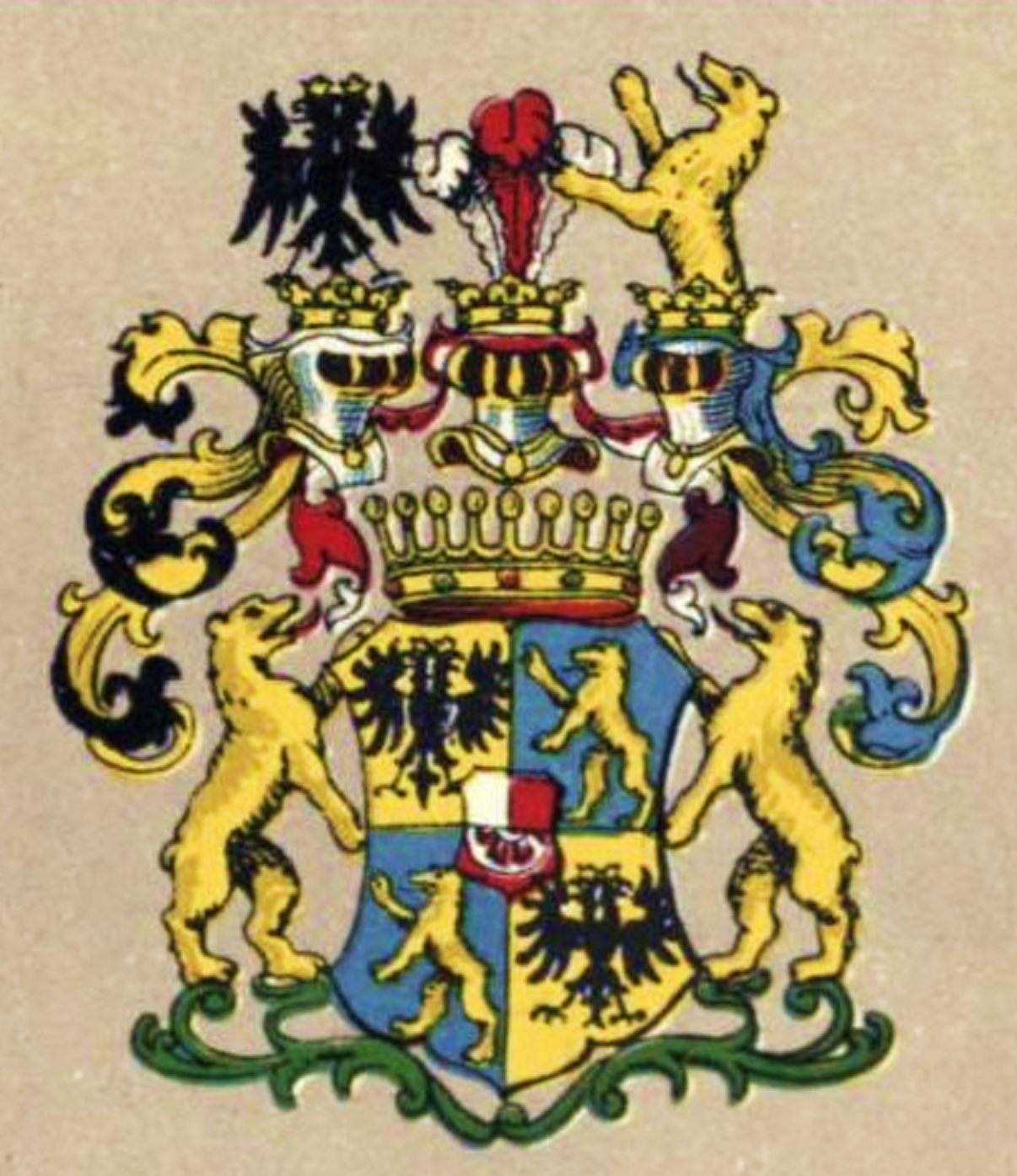
Coat of arms of the Counts Chotek von Chotkow und Wognin

The Chotek family was an old and influential Czech noble family in the Kingdom of Bohemia, whose members occupied many important positions within the Holy Roman Empire and later in the Austro-Hungarian Empire.

== History ==
The family is first documented in the 14th century when Miloslav, his wife Wele and their son Wenlynus are mentioned as masters of the Chockov estate near Radnice in the Plzeň Region. The uninterrupted lineage of the family starts with Otto Chotek of Chockov and Liblín.

In the late 16th century, Václav Chotek took the name of Chotkov and Wognin, while his older brother Adam Chotek retained the name of Chockov and Liblín.

In 1685, the coat of arms of the Chotek family was joined with the coat of arms of the extinct Charwat von Bärnstein family.

On 6 February 1702, Václav Antonín Chotek of Chotkov and Vojnín was elevated to the rank of Bohemian lord (Czech: páni). On 13 May 1743 in Laxenburg, he was awarded the title of Count (Graf, hrabě) in Bohemia. On 4 October 1745 in Frankfurt am Main, he was elevated to the rank of Reichsgraf.

== Branches ==
After the death of Johann Nepomuk Rudolf Chotek von Chotkov und Vojnín in 1824, the family split into four main branches created by his surviving sons:

- Branch of the descendants of Johann Nepomuk Josef Chotek von Chotkow und Wognin (1773 – 1824)
- Branch of the descendants of Josef Chotek von Chotkow und Wognin (1776 – 1809)
- Branch of the descendants of Karl, Count Chotek von Chotkow und Wognin
- Branch of the descendants of Hermann Chotek von Chotkow und Wognin (1786-1822)

The best known member of the family was Sophie, Duchess of Hohenberg, the morganatic wife of Archduke Franz Ferdinand of Austria, as his and her assassination sparked World War I.

== Branch Chotek von Chockov und Liblín ==
Otto Chotek von Chockov und Liblín (?-after 1400)	Anna Šťáhlavská von Doupov
Jan Chotek von Chockov (?-after 1474)	Dorota Mitrovská von Nemyšl
Jindřich Chotek von Chockov (?-before 1500)	Justina Pešíková von Komárov
Jakub Chotek von Chockov (?-after 1500)	Jana Mašťovská von Kolovrat
Petr Chotek von Chockov (?-before 1537)	Kristina von Zedtwitz
Mikuláš Chotek von Chockov	?	Václav Chotek of Chockov (?-before 1568)	Dorota Kokořovská von Kokořov
Kryštof Chotek von Chockov (?-after 1589)	Jan Chotek von Chockov (1519-1591)	Marie Magdalena (Maruš) Beřkovská von Šebířov	Jiří Chotek von Chockov (after 1520-after 1589)	?	Zikmund Chotek von Chockov (after 1521-1603)
Adam Chotek von Chockov (before 1553 - 1592)	Václav Chotek von Chotkov und Vojnín (1553-1612); Continues with Chotkov und Vojnín branch	Adam Chotek von Chockov

== Branch Chotek von Chotkov und Vojnín ==
Václav Chotek von Chotkov und Vojnín (1553-1612)	Eliška Točníková von Křimic
Eliška Charwat von Bärnstein	Karel Chotek von Chotkov und Vojnín (?-1638)	Jiří Chotek von Chotkov und Vojnín (?-1620)	?
Jan Václav Chotek von Chotkov und Vojnín (before 1627-1638)	Jiří Rudolf Chotek von Chotkov and Vojnín (1628-1673)	i. Polyxena Dorota Eleonora Feldhofer von Feldhoffen	Vilém Chotek von Chotkov und Vojnín (1628-1674)	ii. Johanna Sabina Proy von Gaiselsberg und Findtelstein	Adam Jiří Chotek von Chotkov und Vojnín (?-after 1632)
Ignác Rudolf Chotek von Chotkov und Vojnín (?-after 1683)	Alžběta Polyxena Chotková von Chotkov und Vojnín (1670-1714)	Jan Václav Ignác Cukr von Talmfeld	Václav Antonín Chotek von Chotkov und Vojnín (1674-1754)	Maria Theresia Ludmilla Scheidler von Scheidlern
Václav Chotek von Chotkov und Vojnín (1703-1725)	Jan Karel Chotek von Chotkov und Vojnín (1704-1787)	Anna Marie Terezie Josefa Kottulinská of Kotulín	Rudolf Chotek von Chotkov und Vojnin (1707-1771)	Marie Aloisie Štìpánka Kinská vin Vchynic und Tetov
Jan Nepomuk Rudolf Chotek von Chotkov und Vojnín (1748-1824)	Maria Sidonia von Clary und Aldringen	i. Johann Philipp von Taafe	Marie Quidobaldina Brigita Chotková von Chotkov und Vojnín (1738-1810)	ii. Josef Emanuel Canal de Malabayla
Jan Nepomuk Josef Chotek von Chotkov und Vojnín (1773-1824); For continuation see descendants of Jan Nepomuk Josef Chotek	Rudolf Chotek von Chotkov und Vojnín (1775-1779)	Josef Chotek von Chotkov und Vojnín (1776-1809); For continuation see descendants of Josef Chotek	Maria Aloisia Chotková von Chotkov und Vojnín (1777-1864)	Carl Joseph von Clary und Aldringen
Václav František Chotek von Chotkov und Vojnín (1778-1807)	Rudolf Chotek von Chotkov und Vojnín (1780-1782)	Ferdinand Maria Chotek von Chotkov und Vojnín (1781-1836)	Karel Chotek von Chotkov und Vojnín (1783-1868); For continuation see descendants of Karel Chotek	Terezie Chotková von Chotkov und Vojnín (1785-1872)	Heřman Chotek von Chotkov und Vojnín (1786-1822); For continuation see descendants of Heřman Chotek

=== Descendants of Jan Nepomuk Josef Chotek ===
Jan Nepomuk Josef Chotek von Chotkov und Vojnín (1773-1824)	Maria Isabella von Rottenhan (1774-1817)
Jindřich Chotek von Chotkov und Vojnín (1802-1864)	Karolina Aloisie von und zu Eltz gennant Faust von Stromberg	Sidonie Chotková von Chotkov und Vojnín (1805-1890)	Friedrich Dominik von und zu Fünfkirchen
i. Maria Theresia von Auersperg	Rudolf Karel Chotek von Chotkov und Vojnín (1832-1894)	ii. Klaudine Maria Beata von Gudenus	Emerich Karel Boromejský Jindřich Jan Nepomuk David Chotek von Chotkov und Vojnín (1833-1911)	Julie Henrietta Maria von Thun-Hohenstein	Ferdinand Tadeáš Karel Boromejský Jindřich Jan Nepomuk Chotek von Chotkov und Vojnín (1838-1913)	Josefina Swéerts-Sporck
Jan Rudolf Chotek von Chotkov und Vojnín (1865-1884)	Isabela Chotková von Chotkov und Vojnín (1842-1857)	Arnošt Chotek von Chotkov und Vojnín (1844-1927)	Karolina Isabella Chotková von Chotkov und Vojnín (1846-1933)	Emanuel Maria von Thun-Hohenstein

=== Descendants of Josef Chotek ===
Josef Chotek von Chotkov und Vojnín (1776-1809)	Maria Sophia Regina von Auersperg
Vilém Chotek of Chotkov and Vojnín (1803-1850)	Aloisie (Louisa) von Ugarte	Karel Chotek of Chotkov and Vojnín (1805-1832)
Karolina Marie Chotková of Chotkov and Vojnín (1837-1901)	Karl von Lützow	Aloisia (Luise) Ernestina Chotková of Chotkov and Vojnín (1840-1898)	Ernesto Dentice, 7th Prince of Frasso

=== Descendants of Karel Chotek ===
Karel Chotek of Chotkov and Vojnín (1783-1868)	Maria Sophia Berchtoldovna of Uherèic
František Chotek of Chotkov and Vojnín (1818-1818)	Karel Chotek of Chotkov and Vojnín (1821-1821)	Antonín Chotek of Chotkov and Vojnín (1822-1883)	Olga Friederike Leontine von Moltke	Emanuel Chotek of Chotkov and Vojnín (1823-1843)	Ferdinand Chotek of Chotkov and Vojnín (1826-1830)
Bohuslav Chotek of Chotkov and Vojnín (1829-1896)	Vilemína Kinská of Vchynic and Tetov
Karel Maria Pavel Antonín Bohuslav Chotek of Chotkov and Vojnín (1853-1926)	Adelhaid "Ada" Marie Therese zu Hohenlohe-Langenburg	Marie Sophie Olga Karoline Antonie Chotková of Chotkov and Vojnín (1855-1941)	Heinrich Maria von Nostitz-Rieneck	Olga Sophie Marie Natalie Antonie Chotková of Chotkov and Vojnín (1860-1934)
Karel Maria Ladislav Antonín Jan Josef Paschal Chotek of Chotkov and Vojnín (1887-1970)	Lívia Klára Mailáth de Székhely	Antoinette Marie Chotková of Chotkov and Vojnín (1888-1910)	Ada Marie Gabriele Chotková of Chotkov and Vojnín (1890-1939)
Wolfgang Maria Karel Vilém Bohuslav Josef Chotek of Chotkov and Vojnín; On Jan 30, 1901 cr. Count of Künell auf Nedamov (1860-1926)	Anna Elisabeth von Künell	Zdeňka (Sidonia) Marie Chotková of Chotkov and Vojnín (1861-1946)	Maria Pia Chotková of Chotkov and Vojnín (1863-1935)	Jaroslav František de Paula Bedřich Desiderius Maria Josef Romedius von Thun-Hohenstein	Karolina "Kara" Maria Olga Alžbìta Chotková of Chotkov and Vojnín (1865-1919)	Leopold Abraham Maria von Nostitz-Rieneck
Emilie Anna von Künell Auf Nedamov (1902-?)	Sofia Maria Josefína Albína Chotková of Chotkov and Vojnín (1868-1914); From October 4, 1900 Duchess von Hohenberg	Franz Ferdinand Karl Ludwig Joseph Maria Habsburg-Lothringen-D'Este	Terezie Chotková of Chotkov and Vojnín (1871-1871)	Oktavia Maria Josefína Karolína Chotková of Chotkov and Vojnín (1873-1946)	Joachim Maria Joseph Franz de Paula Anton Alfred Alfons von Schönburg-Forderglauchau
Maria Antonia Josefa Karolína Žofie Bonifácia Nepomucena Chotková of Chotkov and Vojnín (1874-1930)	Carl Adam Ludwig Johann Traugott von Wuthenau-Hohenthurm	Marie Henriette Leopoldina Chotková of Chotkov and Vojnín (1880-1964)	Leopold Abraham Maria von Nostitz-Rieneck

=== Descendants of Heřman Chotek ===
Heřman Chotek of Chotkov and Vojnín (1786-1822)	Henrietta Brunswick of Korompa (1789-1857)
Hermína Chotková of Chotkov and Vojnín (1815-1882)	Franz Maria Johann Folliot de Crenneville-Poutet (1815–1888)	Otto Ferdinand Chotek of Chotkov and Vojnín (1816-1889)	Rudolf Chotek of Chotkov and Vojnín (1822-1890)	Maria Antonie Eleonore Christiane Hedwig von Khevenhüller-Metsch (1838-1892)
Henrieta Hermína Rudolfína Ferdinanda Marie Antonie Anna Chotková of Chotkov and Vojnín (1863-1946)	Anna Marie Terezie Chotková of Chotkov and Vojnín (1865-1882)	Gabriela Edmundine Antonie Marie Chotková of Chotkov and Vojnín (1868-1933)	Maria Franz Dominik Karl von Schönborn (1870-1942)	Rudolf Otto Heřman Josef Maria Chotek of Chotkov and Vojnín (1870-1921)	Irma Marie Ráday De Ráda (1871-1945)

== Sources ==
- Ivo Cerman: Chotkové. Příběh úřednické šlechty. Praha Lidové noviny 2008. 757p ISBN 978-80-7106-977-5.
- Adam Wolf - Chotek - In Allgemeine Deutsche Biographie vol.4, Leipzig 1876
- The History of the Chotek Family
- Ancestors of Karl Chotek von Chotkow († 1638) Chotek 2
- Ancestors of Otto Chotek von Chotkow auf Liblin († nach 1400) Wayback Machine
- Ancestor ListWayback Machine
- Roman Freiherr von Procházka: Genealogisches Handbuch erloschener böhmischer Herrenstandsfamilien, p. 54 f., Verlag Degener & Co, Neustadt (Aisch) 1973
- Bowie, Costello, Cox, Engels, Gundlach, Herr, Meyer, Rick, Ryan, Schumacher, Wagner
