= Johann Rudolf, Count Chotek of Chotkow and Wognin =

Austrian politician (1748–1824)

Johann Rudolf
- Count Chotek of Chotkow and Wognin
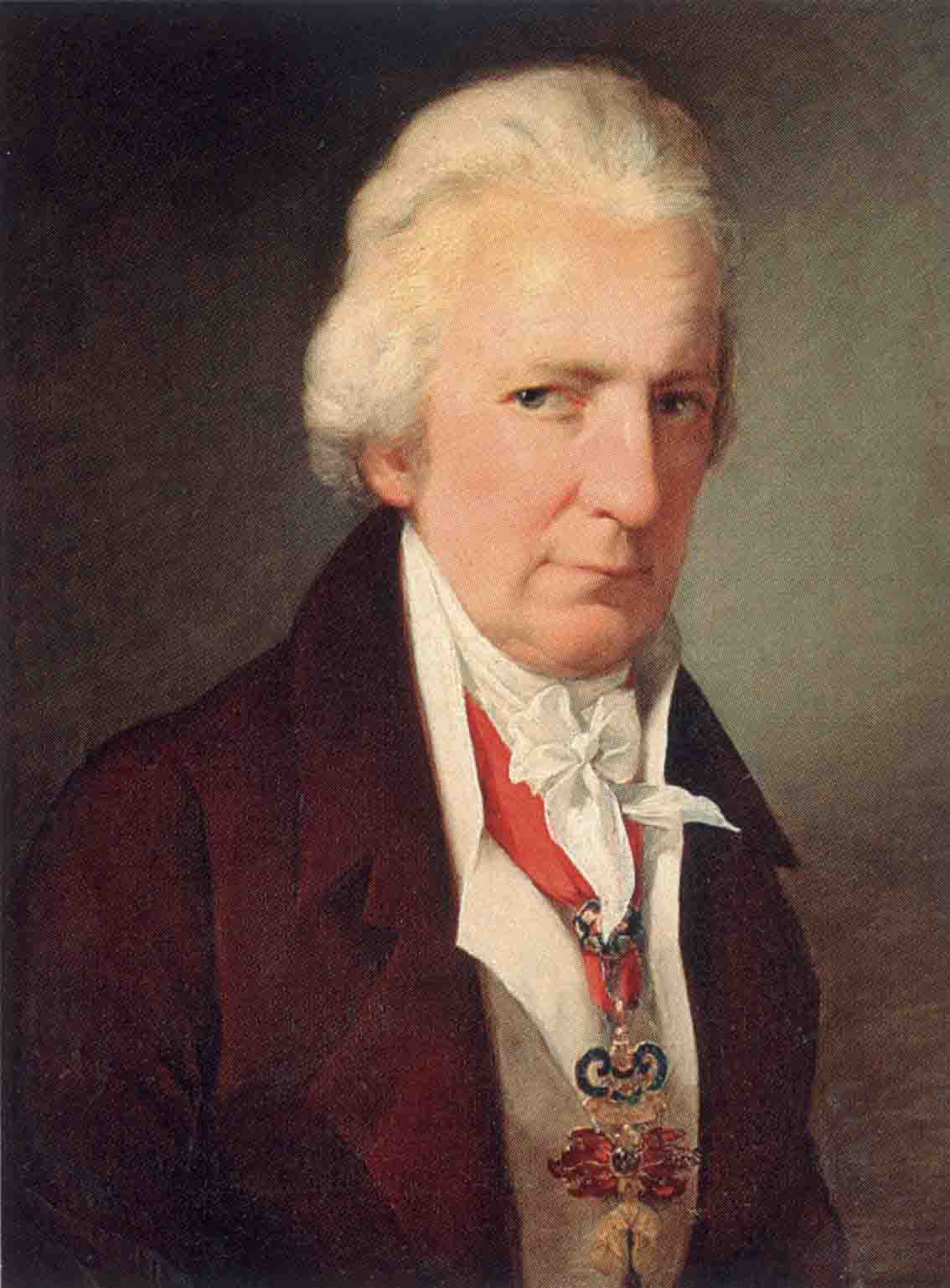
- Full name: Johann Nepomuk Rudolph
- Born: 17 May 1748; Vienna, Habsburg monarchy
- Died: 26 August 1824 (aged 76); Vienna, Austrian Empire
- Noble family: Chotek
- Spouses: Countess Maria Sidonia of Clary and Aldringen
- Issue: Count Johann Nepomuk; Count Josef; Louise, Princess of Clary and Aldringen; Count Wenzel; Ferdinand, Prince-Archbishop and Duke of Olmütz; Karl, Count Chotek of Chotkow and Wognin; Countess Theresa; Count Hermann
- Father: Johann Karl, Count Chotek of Chotkow and Wognin
- Mother: Countess Anna Maria Kottulinsky of Kottulin and Krzizkowitz

Johann Rudolf, Count Chotek of Chotkow and Wognin (German: Johann Nepomuk Rudolph Graf Chotek von Chotkow und Wognin; 18 May 1748 – 26 August 1824) was an Austrian finance minister and government president (Gubernialpräsident) in the Kingdom of Bohemia.

== Early life ==
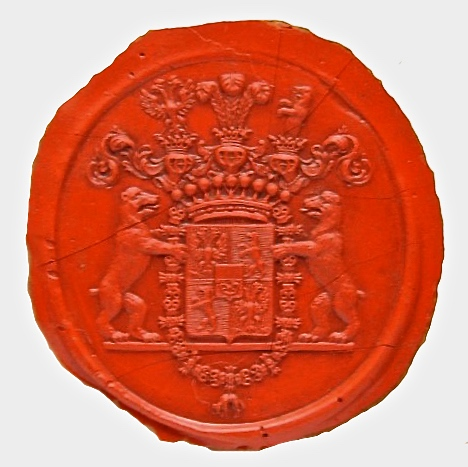
Sigil from ≈ y.1808

Johann Rudolf was born at Vienna, Habsburg monarchy, the only son of Johann Karl, Count Chotek of Chotkow and Wognin (1704–1787) and Countess Anna Maria Kottulinsky of Kottulin and Krzizkowitz (1711–1798).

== Career ==
In 1770, he served in the Lower Austrian government, and in 1776 he was Councilor at the chancellery. In 1788, he allegedly resigned on account of his health, but in fact did so because of his poor relationship with the Holy Roman Emperor, Joseph II.

Under the reign of Joseph II's successor Leopold II, in 1790 he was appointed president of the newly-constituted Finanzhofstelle. In 1793 he was dismissed, but in 1802 was elevated to Minister of State and Supreme Burgrave of Bohemia. He particularly superintended road construction, and established factories with English looms and spinning machines. From 1805 to 1809 he was a member of the ministry conference after the Treaty of Schönbrunn, President of the normal political Hofkommission in legislative matters.

In 1808, he was awarded the Order of the Golden Fleece.

== Personal life ==
On 18 May 1772 in Vienna, Johann Rudolf married Countess Maria Sidonia of Clary and Aldringen (1748–1824), second daughter of Franz Wenzel, 1st Prince of Clary and Aldringen, and his wife, Countess Josepha of Hohenzollern-Hechingen. Together, they had eight children:

- Count Johann Chotek of Chotkow and Wognin (1773–1824), who married Countess Maria Isabella of Rottenhan in 1779.
- Count Josef Chotek of Chotkow and Wognin (1776–1809), who married Princess Maria Sophie of Auersperg in 1802.
- Countess Louise Chotek of Chotkow and Wognin (1777–1864), who married Carl Joseph, 3rd Prince of Clary-Aldringen in 1802.
- Count Wenzel Chotek of Chotkow and Wognin (d. 1807)
- Count Ferdinand Chotek of Chotkow and Wognin (1781–1836), Prince-Archbishop and Duke of Olmütz.
- Karl, Count Chotek of Chotkow and Wognin (1783–1868), who married Countess Marie Berchtold, Baroness of Ungarschitz in 1817.
- Countess Theresa Chotek of Chotkow and Wognin (b. 1785)
- Count Heřman Chotek of Chotkow and Wognin (1786–1822), who married Countess Henrietta Brunswick of Korompa.

After his death in 1824, the family split into four main branches created by his surviving sons.

== Ancestry ==
Ancestors of Johann Rudolf, Count Chotek of Chotkow and Wognin

8. Georg Rudolph Chotek of Chotkowa and Wognin
4. Count Wenzel Chotek of Chotkow and Wognin
9. Baroness Johanna Sabina Proy of Gaiselsperg
2. Johann Karl, Count Chotek of Chotkow and Wognin
10. Ritter Ferdinand Christoph Scheidler of Scheidlen
5. Maria Theresa Scheidler of Scheidlen
11. Countess Maria Theresa Losy of Losimthal
1. Johann Rudolf, Count Chotek of Chotkow and Wognin
12. Baron Christoph Ferdinand Kottulinsky of Kottulin
6. Count Franz Carl Kottulinsky of Kottulin and Krizkowitz
13. Baroness Magdalena Engelburg Grodziecky of Grodziec
3. Countess Anna Maria Kottulinsky of Kottulin and Krzizkowitz
14. Count Johann Christoph of Rottal
7. Countess Maria Antonia of Rottal
15. Countess Maria Susanna of Kuefstein

== Sources ==
- Genealogisches Handbuch des Adels, Fürstliche Häuser, Reference: 1956.
