= Kokořín =

- Municipality
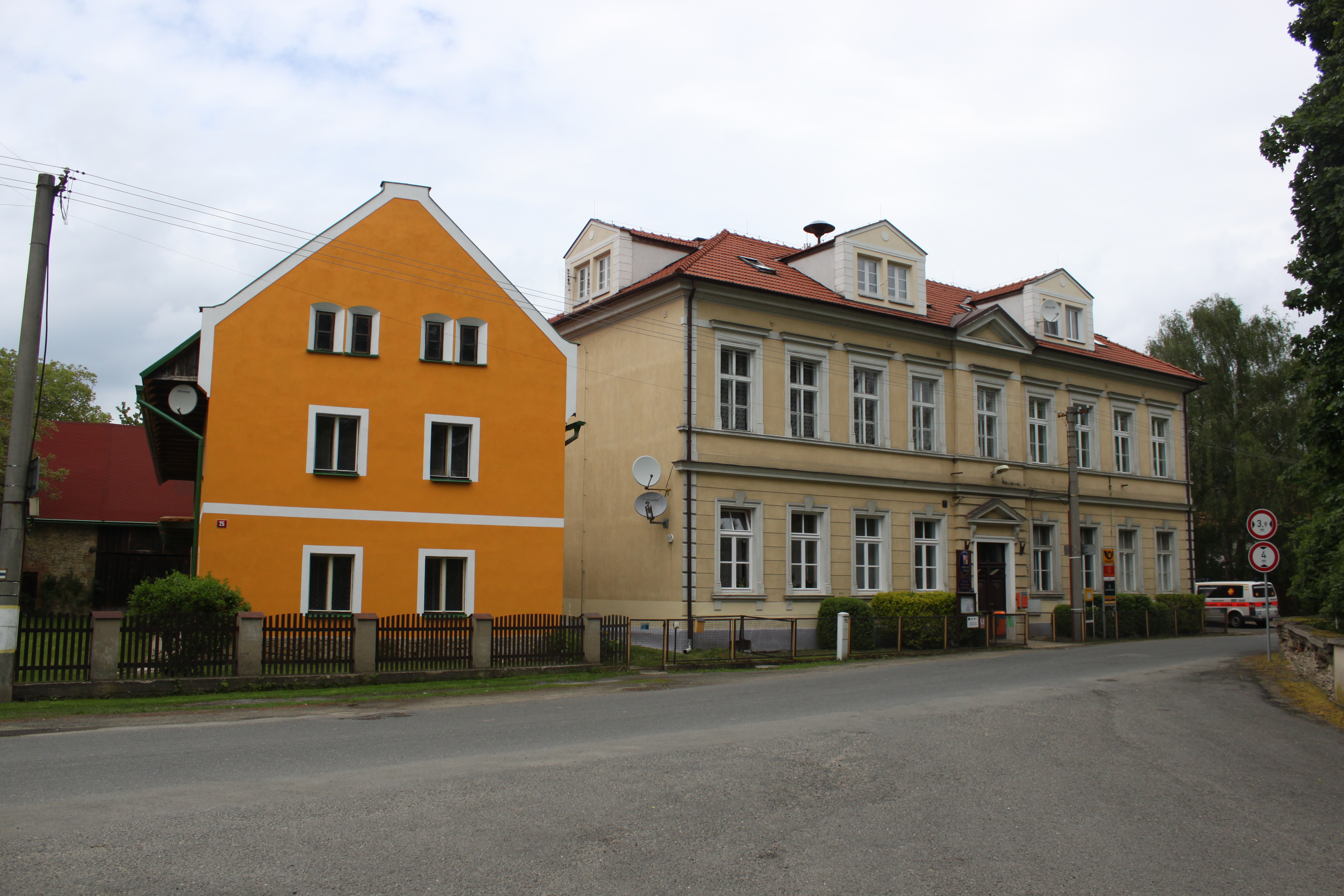
- Municipal office

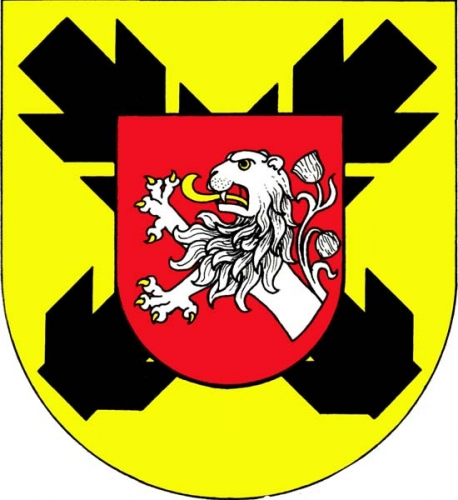
- Flag Coat of arms

- Location in the Czech Republic
- Coordinates: 50°25′48″N 14°34′2″E
- Country: Czech Republic
- Region: Central Bohemian
- District: Mělník
- First mentioned: 1320

Area
  - Total: 16.41 km^{2} (6.34 sq mi)
- Elevation: 333 m (1,093 ft)

Population (2026-01-01)
  - Total: 405
  - Density: 24.7/km^{2} (63.9/sq mi)
- Time zone: UTC+1 (CET)
  - Summer (DST): UTC+2 (CEST)
- Postal code: 277 23
- Website: obeckokorin.cz

Kokořín is a municipality and village in Mělník District in the Central Bohemian Region of the Czech Republic. It has about 400 inhabitants. Kokořín is known for the Kokořín Castle, protected as a national cultural monument.

== Administrative division ==
Kokořín consists of six municipal parts (in brackets population according to the 2021 census):

- Kokořín (187)
- Březinka (43)
- Janova Ves (55)
- Kokořínský Důl (43)
- Šemanovice (36)
- Truskavna (16)

== Etymology ==
The name is derived from the personal name Kokora, meaning "Kokora's".

== Geography ==
Kokořín is located about 10 kilometres (6 mi) northeast of Mělník and 35 km (22 mi) north of Prague. It lies in the Ralsko Uplands. The highest point is the hill Spálený vrch at 375 m (1,230 ft) above sea level. The entire municipal territory lies in the Kokořínsko – Máchův kraj Protected Landscape Area.

== History ==
The first written mention of Kokořín is from 1320.

== Demographics ==
Historical population

Year	Pop.	±%
1869	1,340	—
1880	1,240	−7.5%
1890	1,162	−6.3%
1900	1,164	+0.2%
1910	1,063	−8.7%

Year	Pop.	±%
1921	1,033	−2.8%
1930	989	−4.3%
1950	702	−29.0%
1961	561	−20.1%
1970	452	−19.4%

Year	Pop.	±%
1980	362	−19.9%
1991	366	+1.1%
2001	365	−0.3%
2011	351	−3.8%
2021	380	+8.3%

Source: Censuses

== Transport ==
There are no railways or major roads passing through the municipality.

== Sights ==
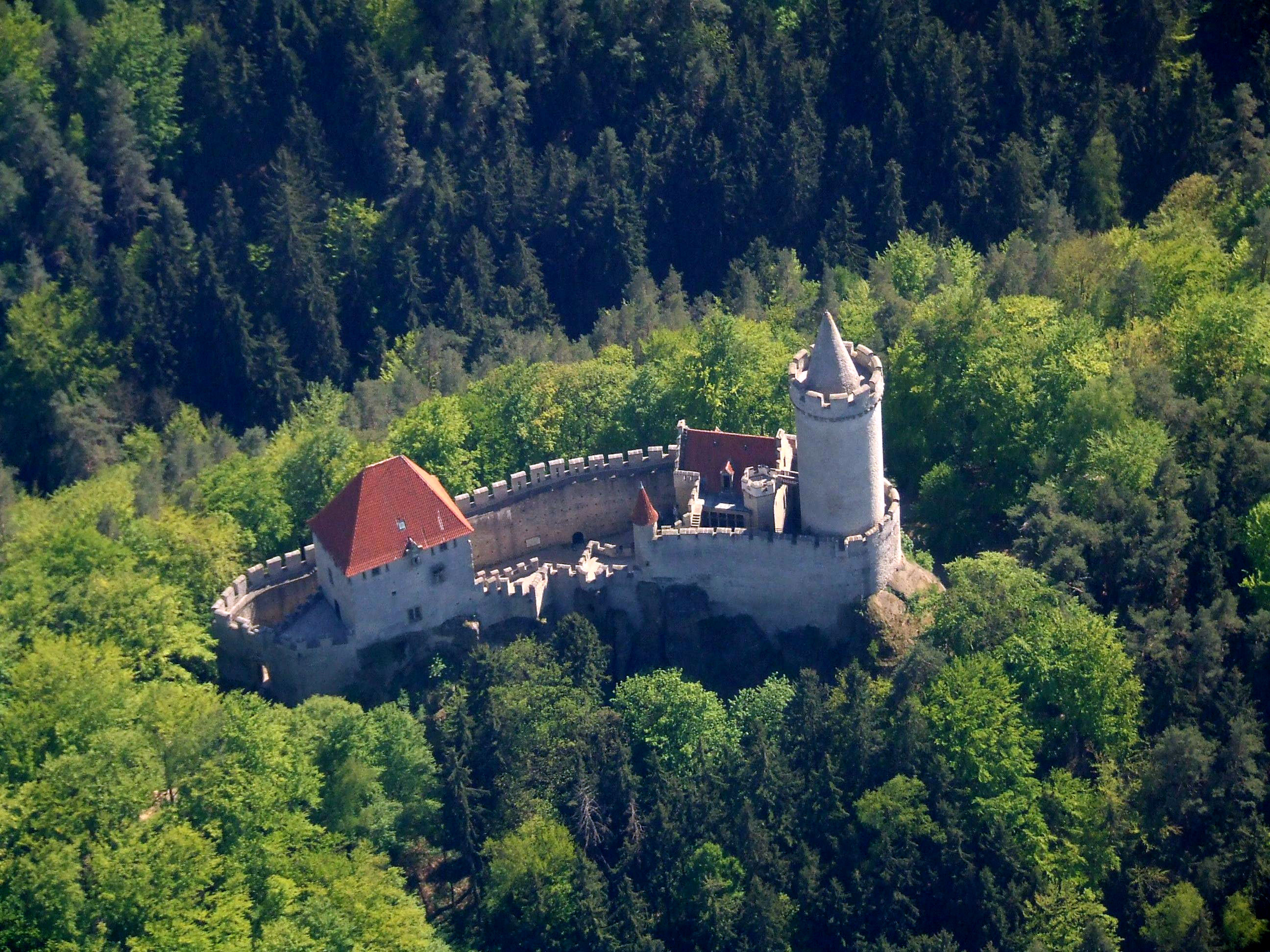
Kokořín Castle

The main landmark is the Kokořín Castle. It was originally a medieval fortress carved in the local sandstone. In the mid-14th century, it was rebuilt into the castle. The castle became a ruin during the Hussite Wars, but was completely reconstructed in 1911–1918. Today it is open to the public and offers guided tours. It is protected as a national cultural monument.

Kokořín Chateau is a small rural Baroque castle from the mid-18th century. Today the building is privately owned and inaccessible.

== Notable people ==
- Václav Bolemír Nebeský (1818–1882), poet and translator
