= Kokořín Castle =

14th-century castle in the Czech Republic

Coordinates: 50°26′25″N 14°34′36″E

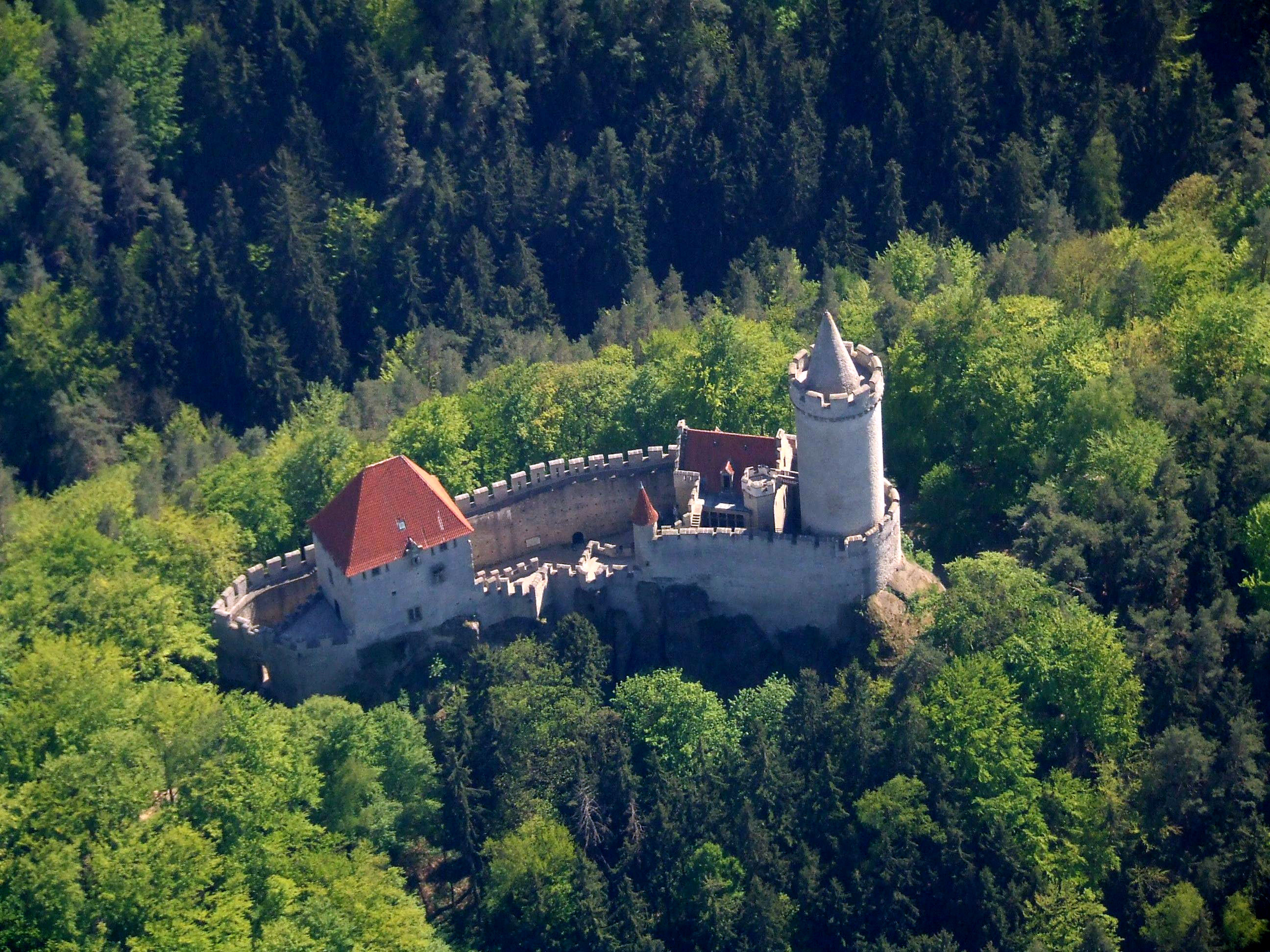
Kokořín Castle

Kokořín Castle (Czech: hrad Kokořín) is a castle located in Kokořín in the Central Bohemian Region of the Czech Republic. It was built in the first half of the 14th century by order of Hynek Berka of Dubá. It was heavily damaged during the Hussite Wars and stood in ruins until the reconstruction campaign of 1911–1918. It was nationalised in 1948 and has been designated a national cultural monument since 2001. The Kokořínsko – Máchův kraj Protected Landscape Area takes its name from this castle.

== History ==
In 1426, Hussite troops captured and destroyed the castle. After the Hussite Wars, the castle often changed owners (in the 15th century, Řitka from Bezdědice and the Klinštějns, in the 16th century, the Beřkov family from Šebířov and Kaplířová). Since 1544 it was listed as deserted. Its fate was made even worse by the decision of Emperor Ferdinand II to classify it among the so-called cursed castles, i.e. castles that were not allowed to be maintained, because otherwise, thanks to their advantageous location, they could threaten the monarch's power.

In 1894, the Prague businessman Václav Špaček bought the ruins, and his son Jan had it reconstructed in neo-Gothic style before World War I. In the years 1911–1916, the castle was modified to its present form by the architect Eduard Sochor according to the instructions of August Sedláček and Čeněk Zíbrt. In 1951, the castle was nationalised or confiscated. It became a national cultural monument in 2001. It was returned to the Špaček family in 2006.
