= Veltrusy Mansion =

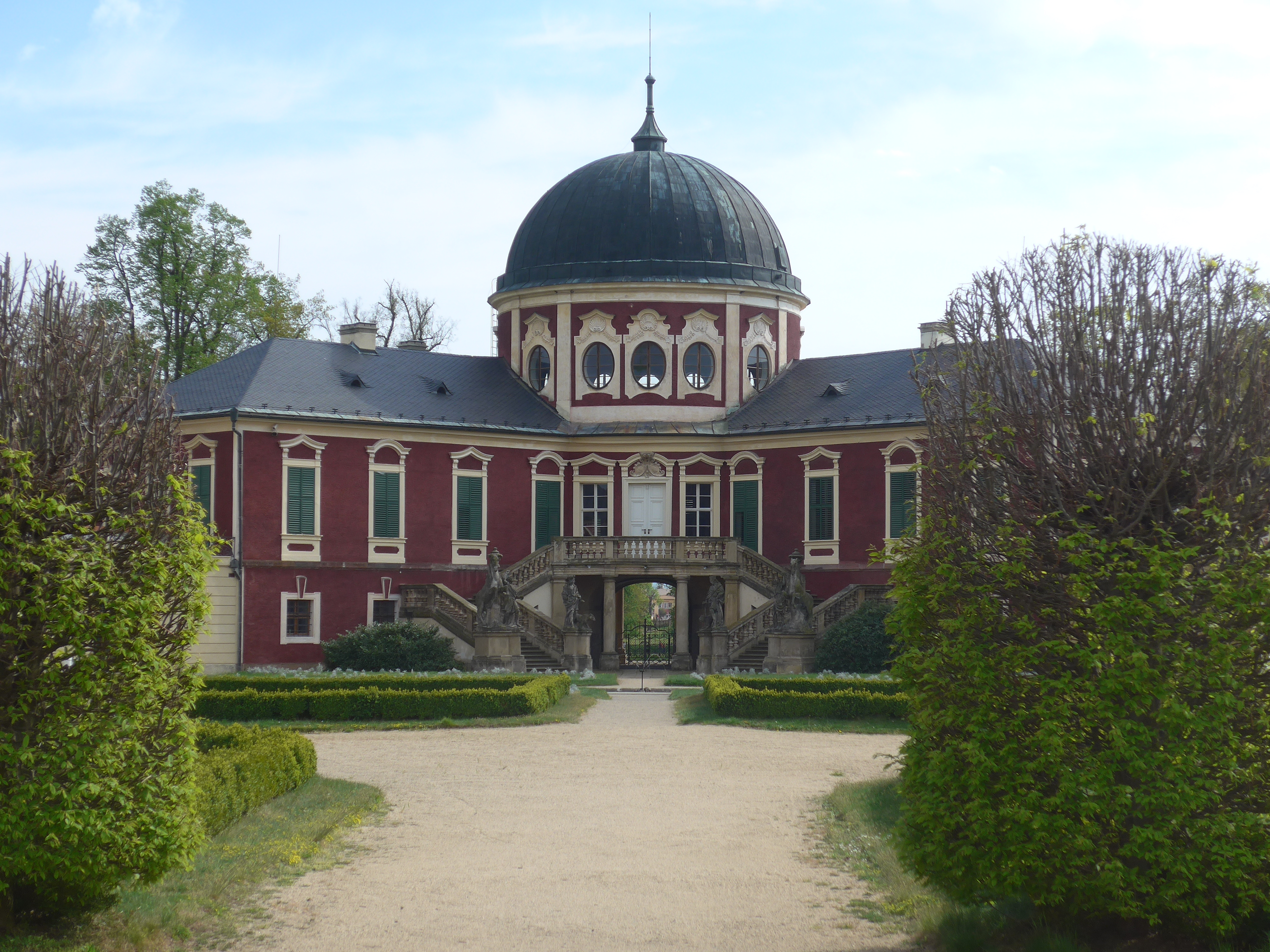
The central part of Veltrusy Mansion, with the double staircase

Veltrusy Mansion (Czech: zámek Veltrusy) is a Baroque castle in Veltrusy in the Central Bohemian Region of the Czech Republic. The mansion is situated near the banks of the Vltava River, about 25 km north of Prague. The castle is open to the public and offers guided tours.

The mansion was built by architect Giovanni Battista Alliprandi for Count Václav Antonín Chotek of Chotkov and Vojnín. The original mansion was extended on the orders of Count Rudolf Chotek of Chotkov and Vojnín, who also commissioned the interior decoration. Further extensions and the annexes of the mansion were constructed in 1804.
