= Johann Karl, Count Chotek of Chotkow and Wognin =

Johann Karl
- Count Chotek of Chotkow and Wognin
- Full name: Johann Karl Ritter
- Born: 29 October 1704; Prague, Kingdom of Bohemia
- Died: 8 November 1787 (aged 83); Vienna, Habsburg monarchy
- Noble family: Chotek
- Spouses: Countess Anna Maria Kottulinsky of Kottulin and Krzizkowitz
- Issue: Johann Rudolf, Count Chotek of Chotkow and Wognin
- Father: Count Wenzel Chotek of Chotkow and Wognin
- Mother: Maria Theresa Scheidler of Scheidlen

Johann Karl, Count Chotek of Chotkow and Wognin (German: Johann Karl Ritter Graf Chotek von Chotkow und Wognin; 29 October 1704 – 8 November 1787) was a Bohemian-Austrian chancellor.

== Life ==
Johann Karl was born at Prague, Kingdom of Bohemia as the elder son of Count Wenzel Chotek of Chotkow and Wognin (1674–1754) and Maria Theresa Scheidler of Scheidlen (1684–1709). He came of an old Bohemian noble family, with residence in Choczkow at Radnice (Plzeň Region). His father held the position of Austrian Stadtholder of the Kingdom of Bohemia from 1735–1738.

He was Imperial Governor and field-marshal of the Upper Palatinate. Then he was a Bohemian-Austrian Imperial Director and chancellor

In 1753, Empress Maria Theresa gave him the Palais Strozzi in the Josefstadt (Vienna), he ordered the building of a new wing. Further expansion plans and the Seven Years' War, however, forced him to sell large part of the garden.

He was a Knight of St. Wenzel Order.

== Marriage and family ==
Johan Karl married on 25 May 1740 in Vienna to Countess Anna Maria Kottulinsky of Kottulin and Krzizkowitz (1711–1798), youngest child of Count Franz Carl Kottulinsky of Kottulin and Krizkowitz, and his wife, Countess Maria Antonia of Rottal.

They had one son:

- Johann Rudolf, Count Chotek of Chotkow and Wognin (18 May 1748 – 26 August 1824), married in 1772 to Countess Maria Sidonia of Clary and Aldringen; had issue.

== Ancestry ==
Ancestors of Johann Karl, Count Chotek of Chotkow and Wognin

16. Wenzel Chotek of Choczkow and Wognin
8. Karl Chotek of Choczkow and Wognin
17. Elisabeth Tocznik of Krzimicz
4. Georg Rudolph Chotek of Chotkowa and Wognin
18. Johann Charwat of Bärnstein
9. Elisabeth Charwat of Bärnstein
19. Anna Kopidlansky of Kopidlan
2. Count Wenzel Chotek of Chotkow and Wognin
20. Wolfgang Proy of Gaiselsberg and Findtstein
10. Baron Johann Georg Proy of Gaiselsperg and Findtstein
21. Maria Magdalena Borinie of Lhota
5. Baroness Johanna Sabina Proy of Gaiselsperg
22. Jaroslaw Zucker of Tamfeld
11. Sibylla Zucker of Tamfeld
23. Anna Sibylla Zdiarsky of Zdiár
1. Johann Karl, Count Chotek of Chotkow and Wognin
6. Ritter Ferdinand Christoph Scheidler of Scheidlen
3. Maria Theresa Scheidler of Scheidlen
28. Thomas Losi
14. Count Anton Losy of Losimthal
7. Countess Maria Theresa Losy of Losimthal
15. Anna Konstanze Koller of Lerchenried

== Notes and sources ==
- Genealogisches Handbuch erloschener böhmischer Herrenstandsfamilien Neustadt an der Aisch, 1973, Procházka, Roman Freiherr von, Reference: 57
- Genealogisches Handbuch des Adels, Fürstliche Häuser, Reference: 1956 547
- Baron Roman Prochazka : Genealogical Handbook extinct Mr. Bohemian-class families. Degener & Co, Neustadt (Aisch) 1973, ISBN 3-7686-5002-2, S. 57. Degener & Co, Neustadt (Aisch) 1973, ISBN 3-7686-5002-2, p. 57
- Heribert Sturm (eds.): Biographical Dictionary of the history of Bohemia. Band 1: A - H . Oldenbourg, München 1974, ISBN 3-486-49491-0, S. 197. Volume 1:. A - H Oldenbourg, Munich 1974, ISBN 3-486-49491-0, p. 197
- Ivo Cerman: Chotkove. Pribeh urednicke slechty. Lidove noviny, Prag 2008, ISBN 978-80-7106-977-5.
