= Biot =

Biot or BIOT may refer to:

== Places ==
- Biot (crater), a lunar crater, named after Jean-Baptiste Biot
- Biot, Alpes-Maritimes, a commune in Provence-Alpes-Côte d'Azur, France
- Biot, a village in Castelnau-de-Brassac, Midi-Pyrénées, France
- Le Biot, Haute-Savoie, France
- Cape Biot, Greenland
- British Indian Ocean Territory (BIOT), an overseas island territory of the United Kingdom situated in the Indian Ocean

== People ==
- Biot (surname), with a list of people of this name

== Fiction ==
- Biot ("BIological robOT"), a biological robot in Arthur C. Clarke's novel Rendezvous with Rama (1973)
- Biot, a fictional world in the DC Comics universe; see Manhunters (comics)
- Biot, Biological Optical Transputer Systems, robots in the Phantom 2040 animated series

== Science ==
- Biological robot, in biomedical engineering etc.
- Biot number, used in heat transfer calculations
- Biot (unit), a unit of electric current
- Biot's breathing, an abnormal breathing pattern

== Other uses ==
- Biot glider company; see List of gliders (B)

== See also ==
- Canton of Antibes-Biot, France
