= Agonal respiration =

Emergent abnormal pattern of breathing

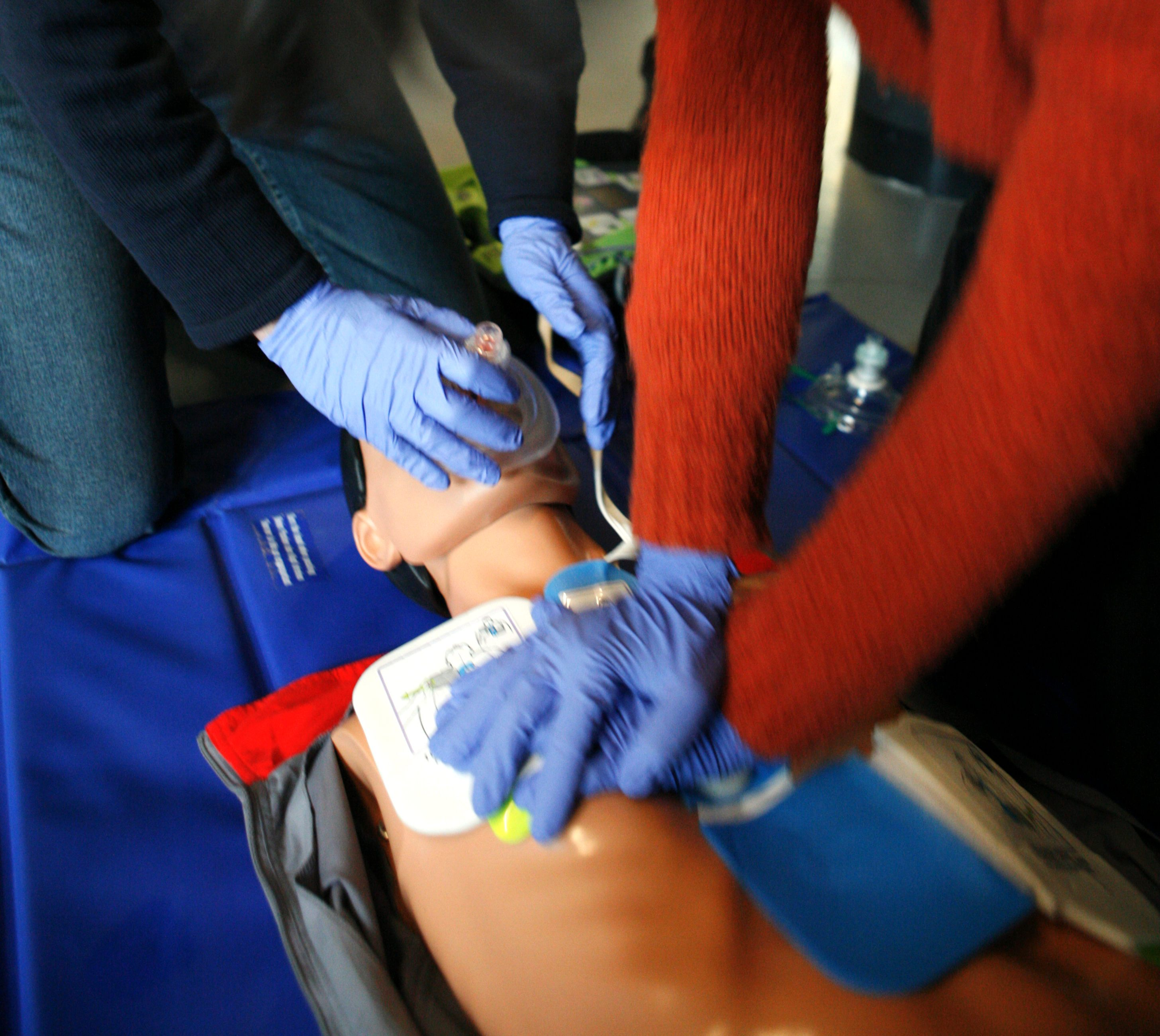
- Medical personnel performing chest compressions as part of Advanced Cardiovascular Life Support (ACLS).
- Specialty: Emergency Medicine
- Treatment: Cardiopulmonary Resuscitation

Agonal respiration, gasping respiration, or agonal breathing is a distinct and abnormal pattern of breathing and brainstem reflex characterized by gasping labored breathing and is accompanied by strange vocalizations and myoclonus. Possible causes include cerebral ischemia, hypoxia (inadequate oxygen supply to tissue), or anoxia (total oxygen depletion). Agonal breathing is a severe medical sign requiring immediate medical attention, as the condition generally progresses to complete apnea and preludes death. The duration of agonal respiration can range from two breaths to several hours of labored breathing.

The term is sometimes inaccurately used to refer to labored, gasping breathing patterns accompanying organ failure, systemic inflammatory response syndrome, septic shock, and metabolic acidosis.

End-of-life inability to tolerate secretions, known as the death rattle, is a different phenomenon.

== Etymology ==
Agonal stems from the word agony, which denotes a struggle. As such, the word agonal is used exclusively in medicine to denote the physiologic dynamics of a person just prior to or at the time of death.

== Epidemiology ==
Agonal respiration occurs in 40% of cardiac arrests experienced outside a hospital environment. Patients with cardiac arrests due to problems with the heart were more likely to experience agonal respirations compared to cardiac arrests from a different cause. Patients with agonal respirations due to cardiac arrest are more likely to be discharged home from a hospital alive compared to those who do not experience agonal respirations during cardiac arrest.

== Etiology ==
Agonal respirations are commonly seen in cases of cardiogenic shock (decreased organ perfusion due to heart failure) or cardiac arrest (failure of heartbeat), where agonal respirations may persist for several minutes after cessation of heartbeat. In an unresponsive, pulseless patient in cardiac arrest, agonal respirations are not effective breaths and are signs of cardiovascular and respiratory system failure.

== Physiology ==
Medulla oblongata – the site of the respiratory center

Breathing is controlled via the respiratory center within the medulla oblongata, which sits at the lowest point of the brainstem. Therefore, agonal breathing confirms brainstem activity, a promising sign. Additionally, it is speculated that the gasping of air is due to a reflex within the brain stem, likely due to low oxygen concentrations within the blood. The respiration is insufficient for the continuation of life as the patient is now at a cardiovascular and respiratory system compromise.

== Clinical features ==
=== Signs ===
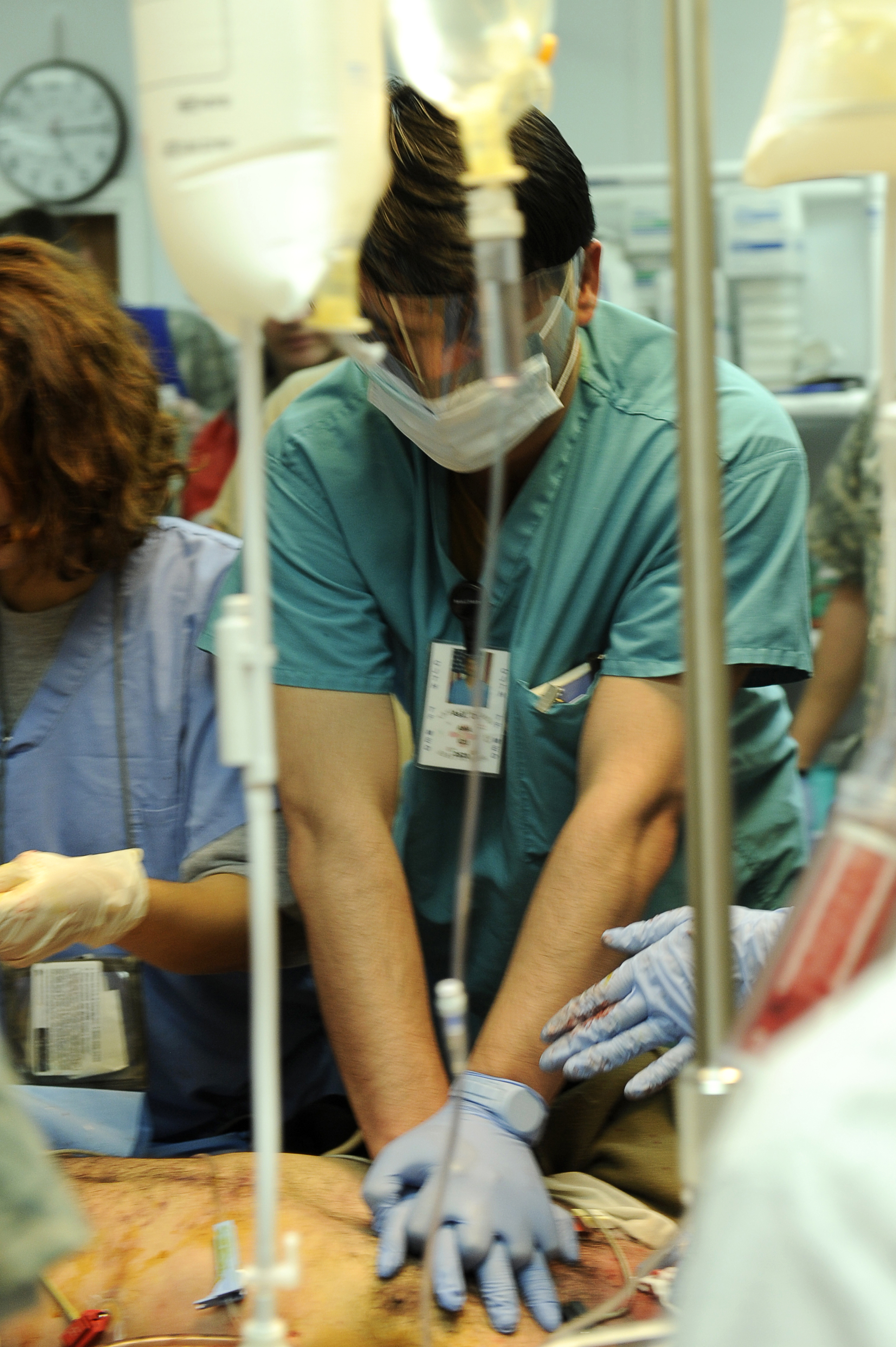
Advanced Cardiac Life Support

Agonal respirations are labored breathing and increased work of breathing that can be described as gasping and irregular in pattern. Often, the breathing coincides with high mortality conditions such as cardiac arrest and cardiogenic shock.

=== Management ===
This breathing indicates an emergency and should initiate CPR (cardiopulmonary resuscitation), including chest compressions, BLS (Basic Life Support), and a call to EMS (Emergency Medical Services). Once the patient is in the care of healthcare professionals, the ACLS protocol may begin in order to achieve ROSC (return of spontaneous circulation), correct arrhythmias, and stabilize the patient.

=== Prognosis ===
The outlook for patients following cardiac arrest and cardiogenic shock relies upon factors such as the cause of the arrest, time without a pulse, response to and quality of CPR, and other health ailments of the patient.

Preserving brainstem activity with agonal breathing correlates with better neurological outcomes for patients with out-of-hospital cardiac arrest. The presence of agonal respirations in these cases indicates a more favorable prognosis than in cases of cardiac arrest without agonal respirations.

== Related patterns ==
=== Death rattle ===
Various breathing abnormalities

Throughout the dying process, patients will lose the ability to tolerate their secretions, resulting in a sound often disturbing and emotionally distressing to visitors termed the death rattle. However, the death rattle is a separate phenomenon from agonal respirations specifically related to the patient's inability to tolerate their secretions.

For patients in the process of dying, without desire for resuscitation efforts (do not resuscitate and do not intubate), managing oral and bronchial secretions (to reduce the sound of the death rattle) with anti-cholinergic medications and decreased fluid hydration may be beneficial in lowering distress upon family and visitors and patient symptoms; however, it will not have an impact on patient outcomes.

=== Kussmaul breathing ===
Respirations characterized by tachypnea and deep breathing to compensate for metabolic acidosis, such as in DKA. This pattern of breathing coincides with respiratory failure. Intubation and mechanical ventilation are necessary.

=== Cheyne Stokes respirations ===
A pattern of breathing during non-REM sleep is closely associated with left heart failure and characterized by intermittent periods of apnea and gradual increase and subsequent decrease in respiratory effort. Patients will often have signs and symptoms of heart failure, such as difficulty breathing when lying flat and sleepiness during the daytime. Notably, this is not an end-of-life breathing pattern, and managing a patient's heart failure is first-line.

=== Ataxic respirations ===
Also known as Biot's respirations, it is a form of breathing associated with neurological injury. It is characterized by irregular normal breathing patterns, apnea, and tachypnea. Named after French physician Camille Biot, the breathing style differs from Cheyne Stokes in that the typical crescendo-decrescendo pattern is absent. The frequency and authenticity of these respirations is debated, however with advancements in medicine, those who would experience these respirations would likely be on mechanical ventilation beforehand.
