= Archduke Franz Ferdinand of Austria =

Heir to the Austrian throne (1863–1914)

Archduke Franz Ferdinand
- Archduke of Austria-Este, Royal Prince of Hungary and Bohemia
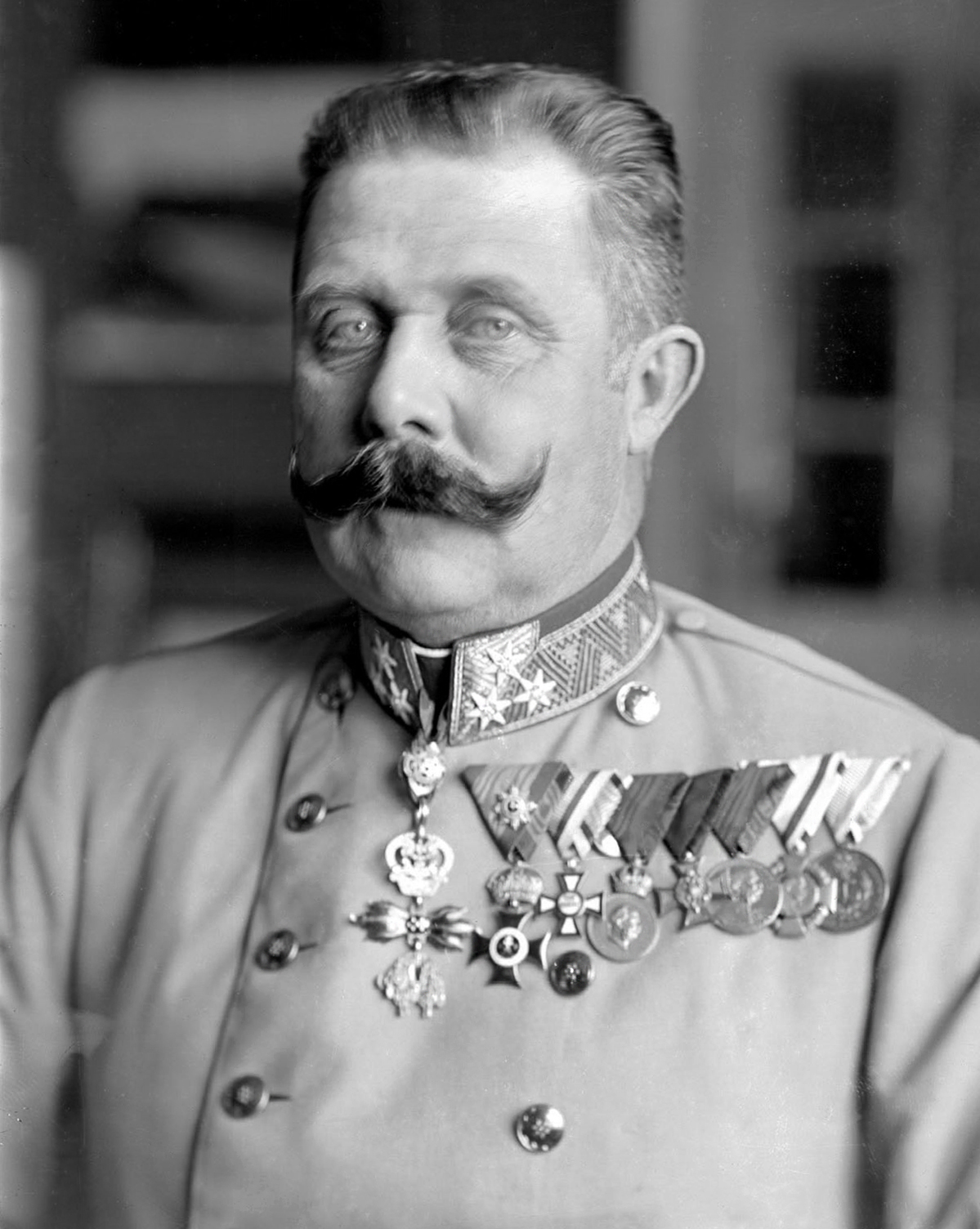
- Franz Ferdinand c. 1914
- Born: 18 December 1863; Graz, Austria
- Died: 28 June 1914 (aged 50); Sarajevo, Austria-Hungary
- Cause of death: Assassination by gunshot
- Burial: 4 July 1914; Artstetten Castle
- Spouse: Sophie, Duchess of Hohenberg (m. 1900; died 1914)
- Issue: Princess Sophie of Hohenberg; Maximilian, Duke of Hohenberg; Prince Ernst of Hohenberg
Names
- Franz Ferdinand Karl Ludwig Joseph Maria; Francis Ferdinand Charles Louis Joseph Maria
- House: Habsburg-Lorraine
- Father: Archduke Karl Ludwig of Austria
- Mother: Princess Maria Annunciata of the Two Sicilies

Archduke Franz Ferdinand Carl Ludwig Joseph Maria of Austria (Note: German: Franz Ferdinand von Österreich-Este, Austrian German pronunciation: [frants ˈfɛrdinand fɔn ˈøːstɐraɪç ˈɛstɛ].) (Francis Ferdinand, 18 December 1863 – 28 June 1914) was the heir presumptive to the throne of Austria-Hungary. His assassination in Sarajevo was the most immediate cause of World War I.

Franz Ferdinand was the eldest son of Archduke Karl Ludwig of Austria, the younger brother of Emperor Franz Joseph I of Austria. Following the death of Crown Prince Rudolf in 1889 and the death of Karl Ludwig in 1896, Franz Ferdinand became the heir presumptive to the Austro-Hungarian throne. His courtship of Sophie Chotek, a lady-in-waiting, caused conflict within the imperial household, and their morganatic marriage in 1900 was only allowed after he renounced his descendants' rights to the throne. Franz Ferdinand held significant influence over the military, and in 1913, he was appointed inspector general of the Austro-Hungarian Armed Forces.

On 28 June 1914, Franz Ferdinand and his wife were assassinated in Sarajevo by the 19-year-old Gavrilo Princip, a member of Young Bosnia. Franz Ferdinand's assassination led to the July Crisis and precipitated Austria-Hungary's declaration of war against Serbia, which in turn triggered a series of events that eventually led – four weeks after his death – to Austria-Hungary's allies and Serbia's allies declaring war on each other, starting World War I.

== Biography ==
=== Early life ===
Franz Ferdinand was born in Graz, then part of the Austrian Empire, the eldest son of Archduke Karl Ludwig of Austria (the younger brother of Franz Joseph and Maximilian) and of his second wife, Princess Maria Annunziata of Bourbon-Two Sicilies. In 1875, when he was eleven years old, his cousin Francis V, Duke of Modena, died, naming Franz Ferdinand his heir on condition that he add the name "Este" to his own. This inheritance made Franz Ferdinand one of the wealthiest men in Austria.

=== Heir presumptive ===
In 1889, Ferdinand's cousin Crown Prince Rudolf committed suicide at his hunting lodge in Mayerling. This left Franz Ferdinand's father, Karl Ludwig, first in line to the throne. When Karl Ludwig died of typhoid fever in 1896, Franz Ferdinand became the heir presumptive to the Austro-Hungarian throne.

Despite this burden, he found time for travel and personal pursuits, such as his circumnavigation of the world between 1892 and 1893. After visiting India he spent time hunting kangaroos and emus in Australia in 1893, then travelled on to Nouméa, New Hebrides, Solomon Islands, New Guinea, Sarawak, Hong Kong and Japan. After sailing across the Pacific on the RMS Empress of China from Yokohama to Vancouver he crossed the United States, arriving at the World's Columbian Exposition 1893 on the Chicago, Burlington, and Quincy Railroad on a private Pullman car named Mascotte, and staying at the Lexington Hotel, before continuing through to New York and returning to Europe.

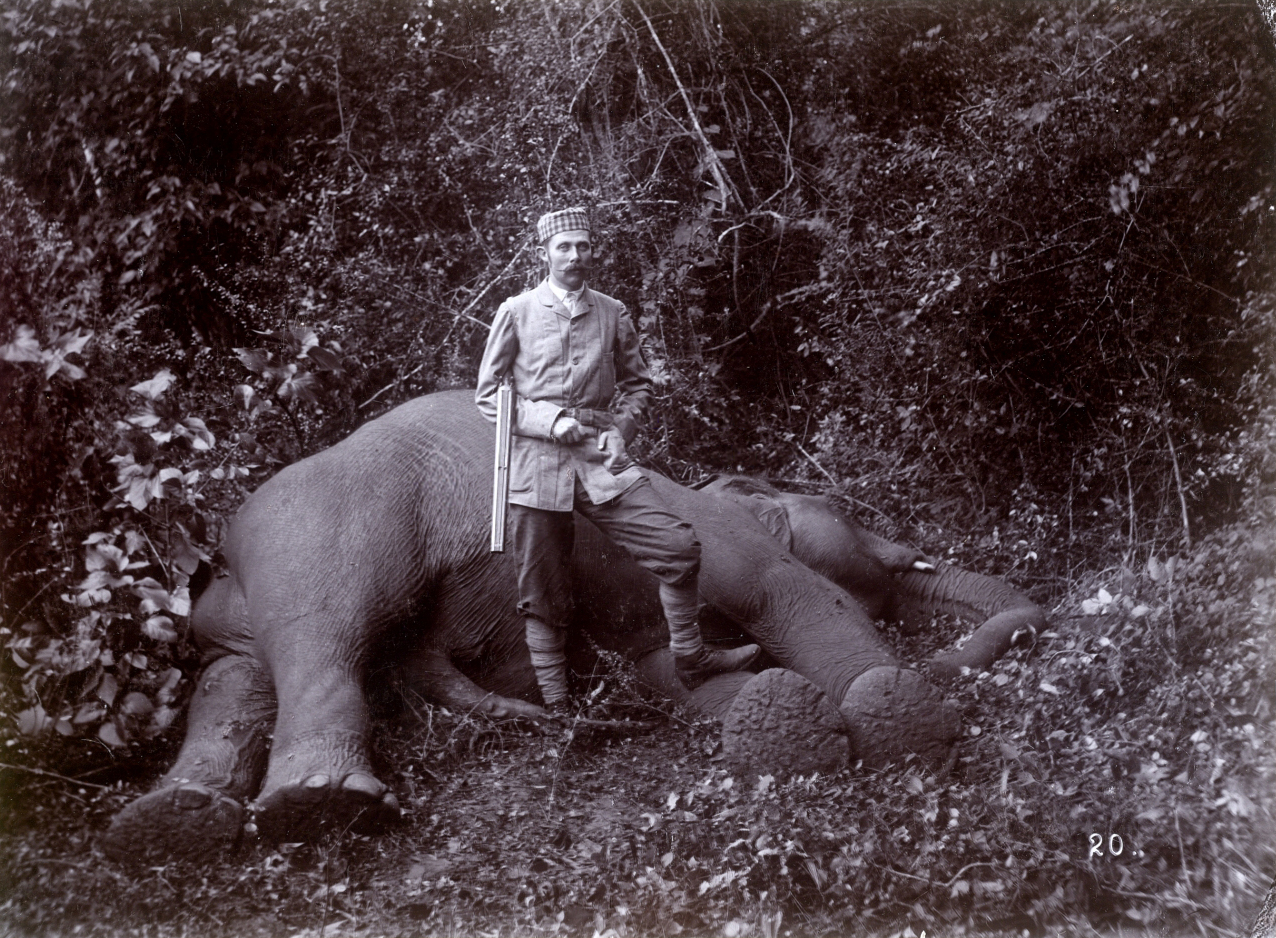
Franz Ferdinand posing in front of a killed elephant, 1893

Franz Ferdinand had a fondness for trophy hunting that was excessive even by the standards of European nobility in his day. In his diaries he kept track of 272,511 game kills, 5,000 of which were deer. About 100,000 trophies were on exhibit at his Bohemian castle at Konopiště which he also stuffed with various antiquities, his other great passion.

=== Military career ===
Franz Ferdinand, like most males in the ruling Habsburg line, entered the Austro-Hungarian Army at a young age. He was frequently and rapidly promoted, given the rank of lieutenant at age fourteen, captain at twenty-two, colonel at twenty-seven, and major general at thirty-one. While never receiving formal staff training, he was considered eligible for command and at one point briefly led the primarily Hungarian 9th Hussar Regiment. In 1898 he was given a commission "at the special disposition of His Majesty" to make inquiries into all aspects of the military services and military agencies were commanded to share their papers with him.

He also held honorary ranks in the Austro-Hungarian Navy, and received the rank of admiral at the close of the Austro-Hungarian naval maneuvers in September 1902.

Franz Ferdinand exerted influence on the armed forces even when he did not hold a specific command through a military chancery that produced and received documents and papers on military affairs. This was headed by Alexander Brosch von Aarenau and eventually employed a staff of sixteen. His authority was reinforced in 1907 when he secured the retirement of the Emperor's confidant Friedrich von Beck-Rzikowsky as Chief of the General Staff. Beck's successor, Franz Conrad von Hötzendorf, was personally selected by Franz Ferdinand.

Franz in 1913, as heir-presumptive to the elderly emperor, had been appointed inspector general of all the armed forces of Austria-Hungary (Generalinspektor der gesamten bewaffneten Macht), a position superior to that previously held by Archduke Albrecht and including presumed command in wartime.

=== Marriage and family ===
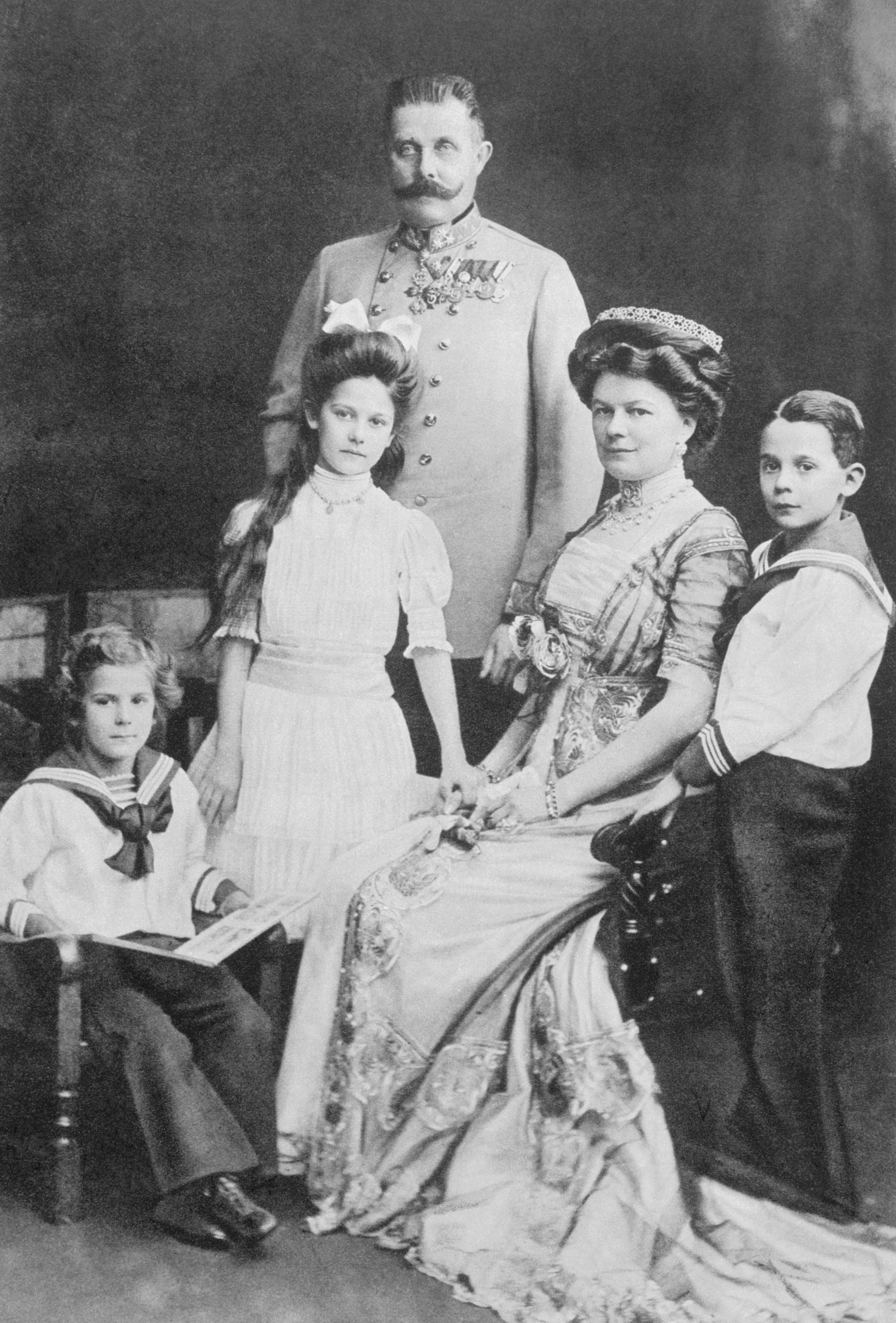
Archduke Franz Ferdinand with his wife Sophie, Duchess of Hohenberg, and their three children (from left), Prince Ernst von Hohenberg, Princess Sophie, and Maximilian, Duke of Hohenberg, in 1910

In 1894, Franz Ferdinand met Countess Sophie Chotek, a lady-in-waiting to Archduchess Isabella, wife of Archduke Friedrich, Duke of Teschen. Franz began to visit Archduke Friedrich's villa in Pressburg (now Bratislava), and in turn Sophie wrote to Franz Ferdinand during his convalescence from tuberculosis on the island of Lošinj in the Adriatic. They kept their relationship a secret, until it was discovered by Isabella.

To be eligible to marry a member of the imperial House of Habsburg, one had to be a member of one of the reigning or formerly reigning dynasties of Europe. The Choteks were not one of these families. Deeply in love, Franz Ferdinand refused to consider marrying anyone else. Finally, in 1899, Emperor Franz Joseph agreed to permit Franz Ferdinand to marry Sophie, provided that the marriage would be morganatic and that their descendants would not have succession rights to the throne. Sophie would not share her husband's rank, title, precedence, or privileges, nor would she normally appear in public beside him. She would not be allowed to ride in the royal carriage or sit in the royal box in theaters.

The wedding took place on 1 July 1900, at Reichstadt (now Zákupy) in Bohemia; Franz Joseph did not attend the ceremony, nor did Franz Ferdinand's brothers or any other archduke. The only members of the imperial family present were Franz Ferdinand's stepmother, Princess Maria Theresa of Braganza, and her two daughters. Upon the marriage, Sophie was given the title "Princess of Hohenberg" (Fürstin von Hohenberg) with the style "Her Serene Highness" (Ihre Durchlaucht). In 1909, she was given the more senior title "Duchess of Hohenberg" (Herzogin von Hohenberg) with the style "Her Highness" (Ihre Hoheit). This raised her status considerably, but she was still required to yield precedence at court to all the archduchesses. Whenever a function required the couple to assemble with the other members of the imperial family, Sophie had to stand far down the line, separated from her husband.

Franz Ferdinand's children were:

- Princess Sophie of Hohenberg (1901–1990), married Count Friedrich von Nostitz-Rieneck (1891–1973)
- Maximilian, Duke of Hohenberg (1902–1962), married Countess Elisabeth von Waldburg zu Wolfegg und Waldsee (1904–1993)
- Prince Ernst of Hohenberg (1904–1954), married Marie-Therese Wood (1910–1985)
- Stillborn son (1908), buried in Artstetten Castle, near his parents

Franz Ferdinand and Sophie visited England in the autumn of 1913, spending a week with George V and Queen Mary at Windsor Castle before going to stay for another week with the Duke of Portland at Welbeck Abbey, Nottinghamshire, where they arrived on 22 November. He attended a service at the local Catholic church in Worksop. Franz Ferdinand and the Duke of Portland went game shooting on the Welbeck estate when, according to Portland's memoirs, Men, Women and Things:

One of the loaders fell down. This caused both barrels of the gun he was carrying to be discharged, the shot passing within a few feet of the archduke and myself. I have often wondered whether the Great War might not have been averted, or at least postponed, had the archduke met his death there and not in Sarajevo the following year.

=== Assassination ===
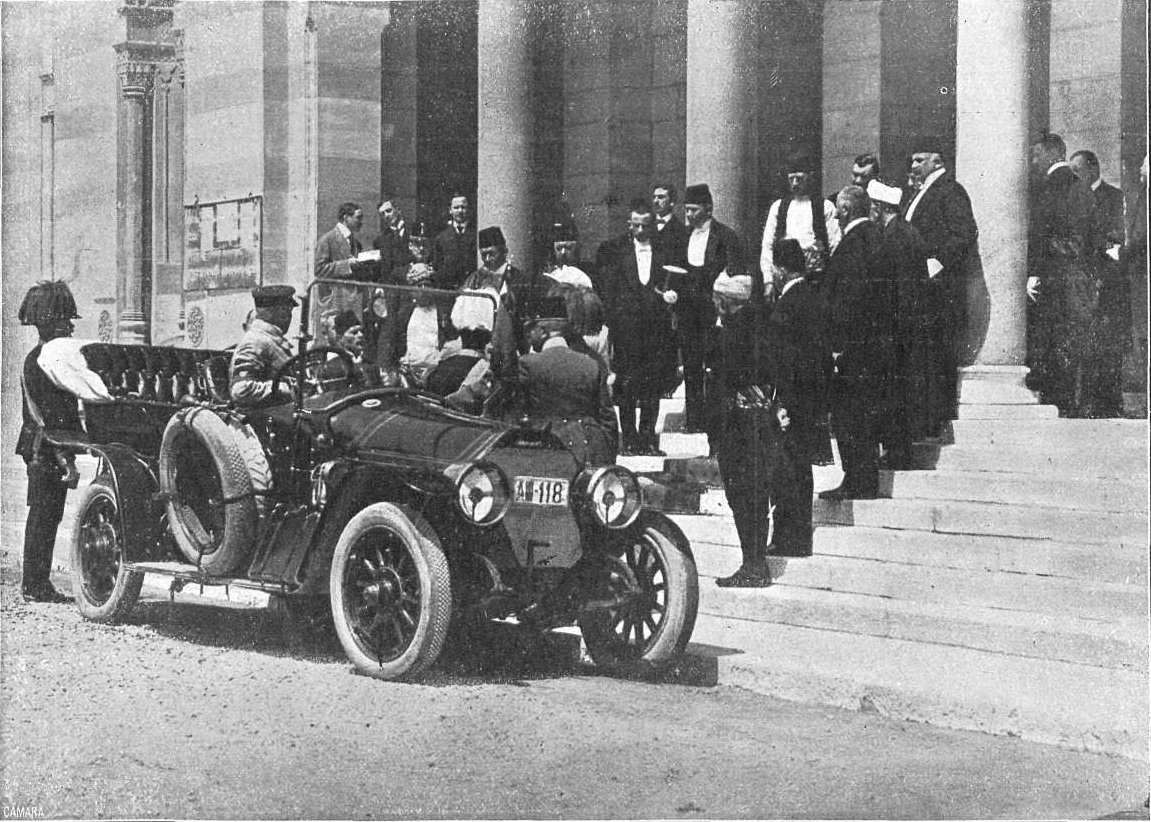
As described by contemporary Spanish magazine El Mundo Gráfico: "The moment when the Austrian archdukes, following the first attempt against their lives, arrived at the City Council (of Sarajevo), where they were received by the mayor and the municipal corporation."

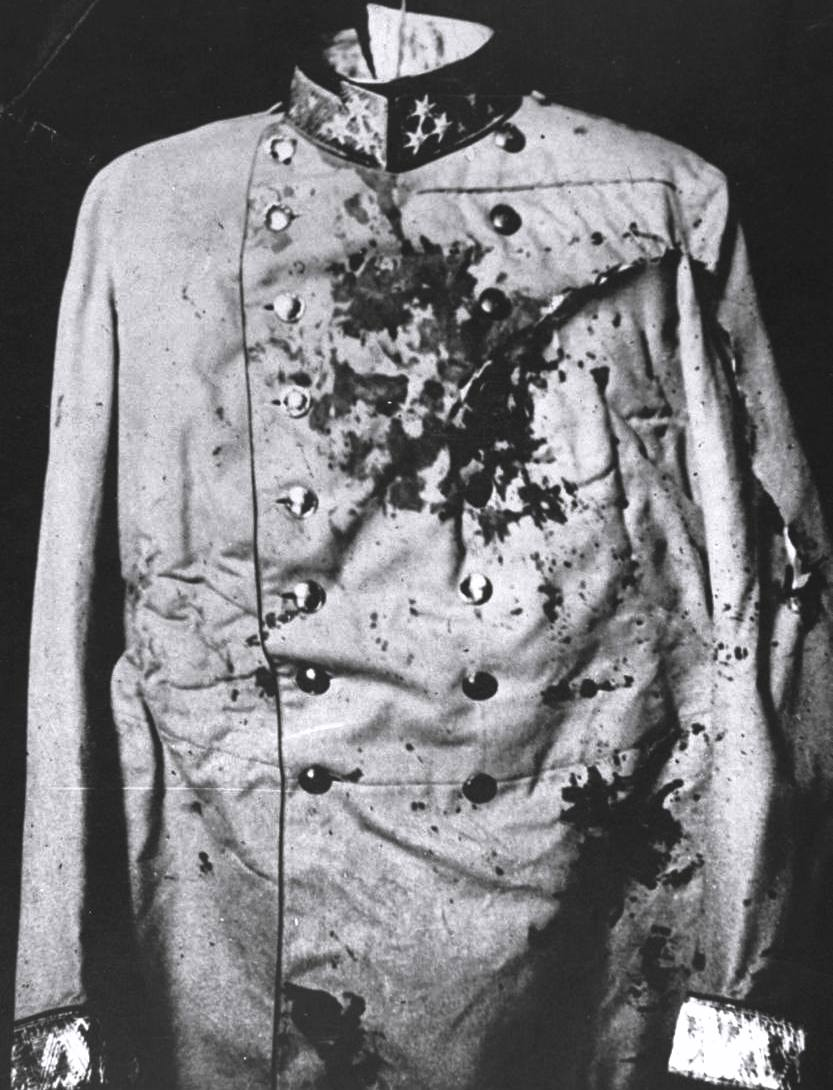
Franz Ferdinand's blood-stained uniform

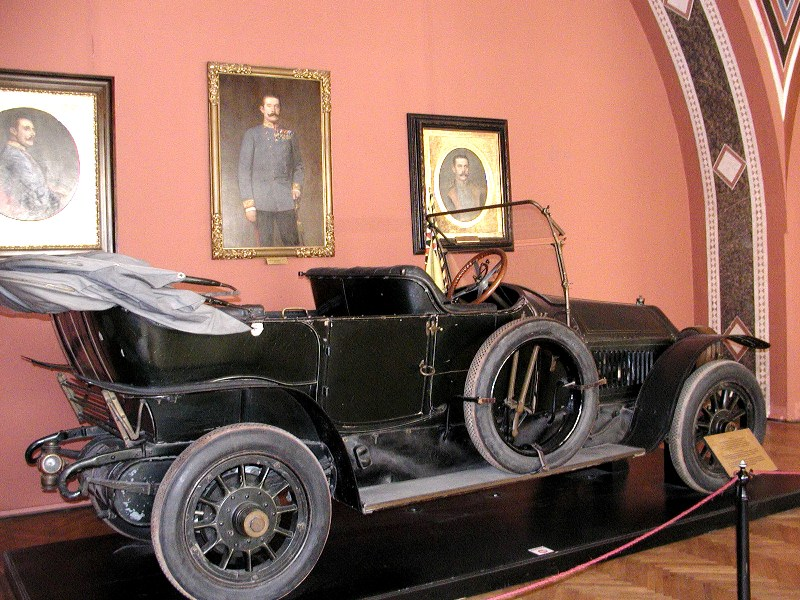
The 1910 Gräf & Stift Bois de Boulogne phaeton automobile in which Archduke Franz Ferdinand and his wife were assassinated. It is now displayed in the Museum of Military History in Vienna

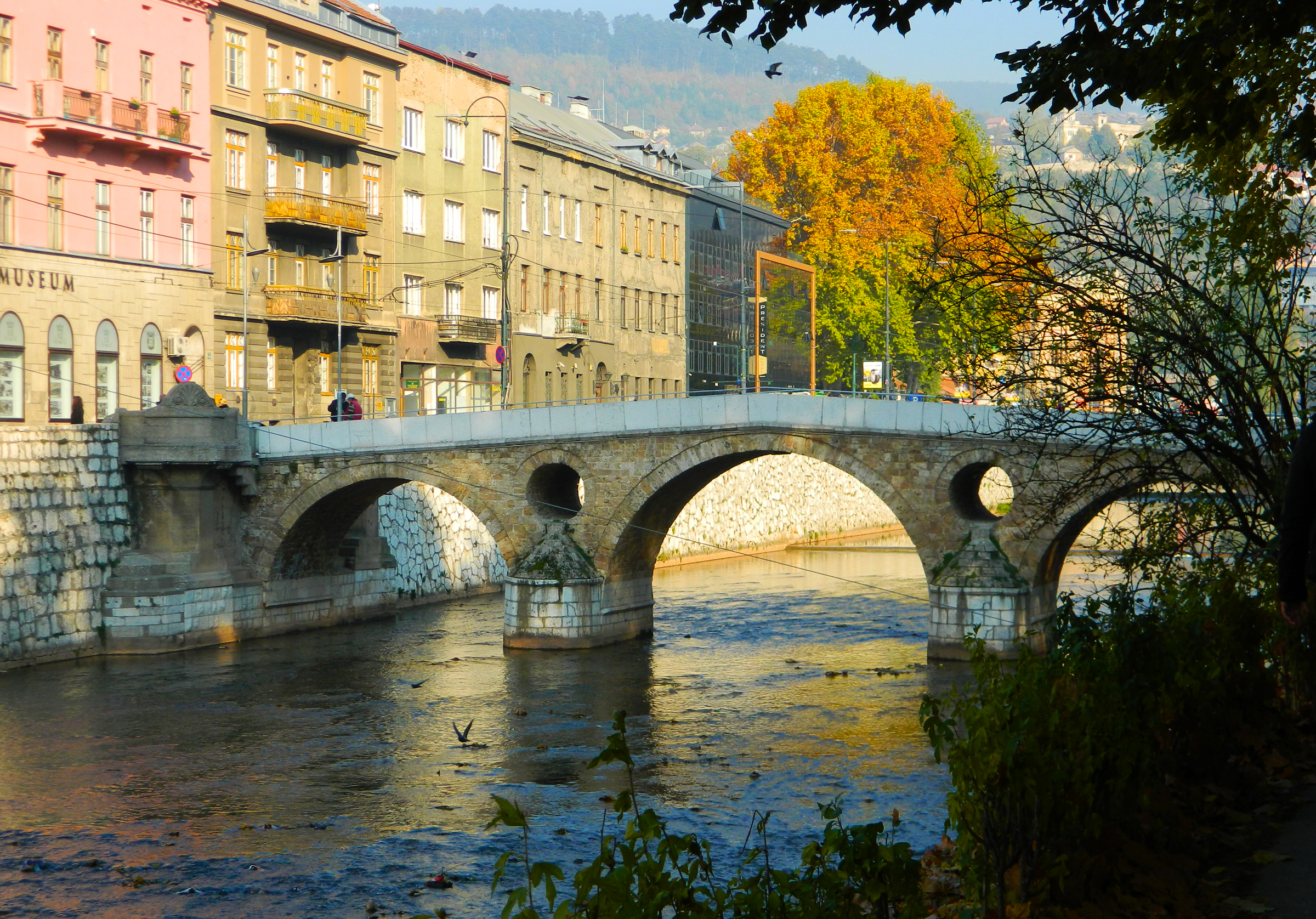
The Latin Bridge near the assassination site

On Sunday, 28 June 1914, at about 10:45 am, Franz Ferdinand and his wife were assassinated in Sarajevo, the capital of the Austro-Hungarian province of Bosnia and Herzegovina. The perpetrator was 19-year-old Gavrilo Princip, a member of Young Bosnia and one of a group of assassins organized and armed by the Black Hand.

Earlier in the day, the couple had been attacked by Nedeljko Čabrinović, also a Young Bosnia conspirator, who had thrown a grenade at their car. However, the bomb detonated behind them, injuring the occupants in the following car. On arriving at the Governor's residence, Franz asked "So you welcome your guests with bombs!"

After a short rest at the Governor's residence, the royal couple insisted on seeing all those who had been injured by the bomb at the local hospital. However, no one told the drivers that the itinerary had been changed. When the error was discovered, the drivers had to turn around. As the cars backed down the street and onto a side street, the line of cars stalled. At this time, Princip was sitting at a cafe across the street. He instantly seized his opportunity and walked across the street and shot the royal couple. He first shot Sophie in the abdomen and then shot Franz Ferdinand in the neck. Franz leaned over his crying wife. He was still alive when witnesses arrived to render aid. His dying words to Sophie were, "Don't die darling, live for our children." Princip's weapon was the pocket-sized FN Model 1910 pistol chambered for the .380 ACP cartridge provided him by Serbian Army Military Intelligence Lieutenant-Colonel and Black Hand leader Dragutin Dimitrijević. Franz Ferdinand's aides attempted to undo his coat but realized they needed scissors to cut it open: the outer lapel had been sewn to the inner front of the jacket for a smoother fit to improve his appearance to the public. Whether or not as a result of this obstacle, his wound could not be attended to in time to save him, and he died within minutes. Sophie also died en route to the hospital.

A detailed account of the shooting can be found in Sarajevo by Joachim Remak:

One bullet pierced Franz Ferdinand's neck while the other pierced Sophie's abdomen. ... As the car was reversing (to go back to the Governor's residence because the entourage thought the Imperial couple were unhurt) a thin streak of blood shot from the Archduke's mouth onto Count Harrach's right cheek (he was standing on the car's running board). Harrach drew out a handkerchief to still the gushing blood. The Duchess, seeing this, called: "For Heaven's sake! What happened to you?" and sank from her seat, her face falling between her husband's knees.

Harrach and Potiorek ... thought she had fainted ... only her husband seemed to have an instinct for what was happening. Turning to his wife despite the bullet in his neck, Franz Ferdinand pleaded: "Sopherl! Sopherl! Sterbe nicht! Bleibe am Leben für unsere Kinder! – Sophie dear! Don't die! Stay alive for our children!" Having said this, he seemed to sag down himself. His plumed hat ... fell off; many of its green feathers were found all over the car floor. Count Harrach seized the Archduke by the uniform collar to hold him up. He asked "Leiden Eure Kaiserliche Hoheit sehr? – Is Your Imperial Highness suffering very badly?" "Es ist nichts. – It is nothing." said the Archduke in a weak but audible voice. He seemed to be losing consciousness during his last few minutes, but, his voice growing steadily weaker, he repeated the phrase perhaps six or seven times more. A rattle began to issue from his throat, which subsided as the car drew in front of the Konak.

The assassinations, along with the arms race, nationalism, imperialism, militarism of Imperial Germany and the alliance system all contributed to the origins of World War I, which began a month after Franz Ferdinand's death, with Austria-Hungary's declaration of war against Serbia. The assassination of Franz Ferdinand is considered the most immediate cause of World War I.

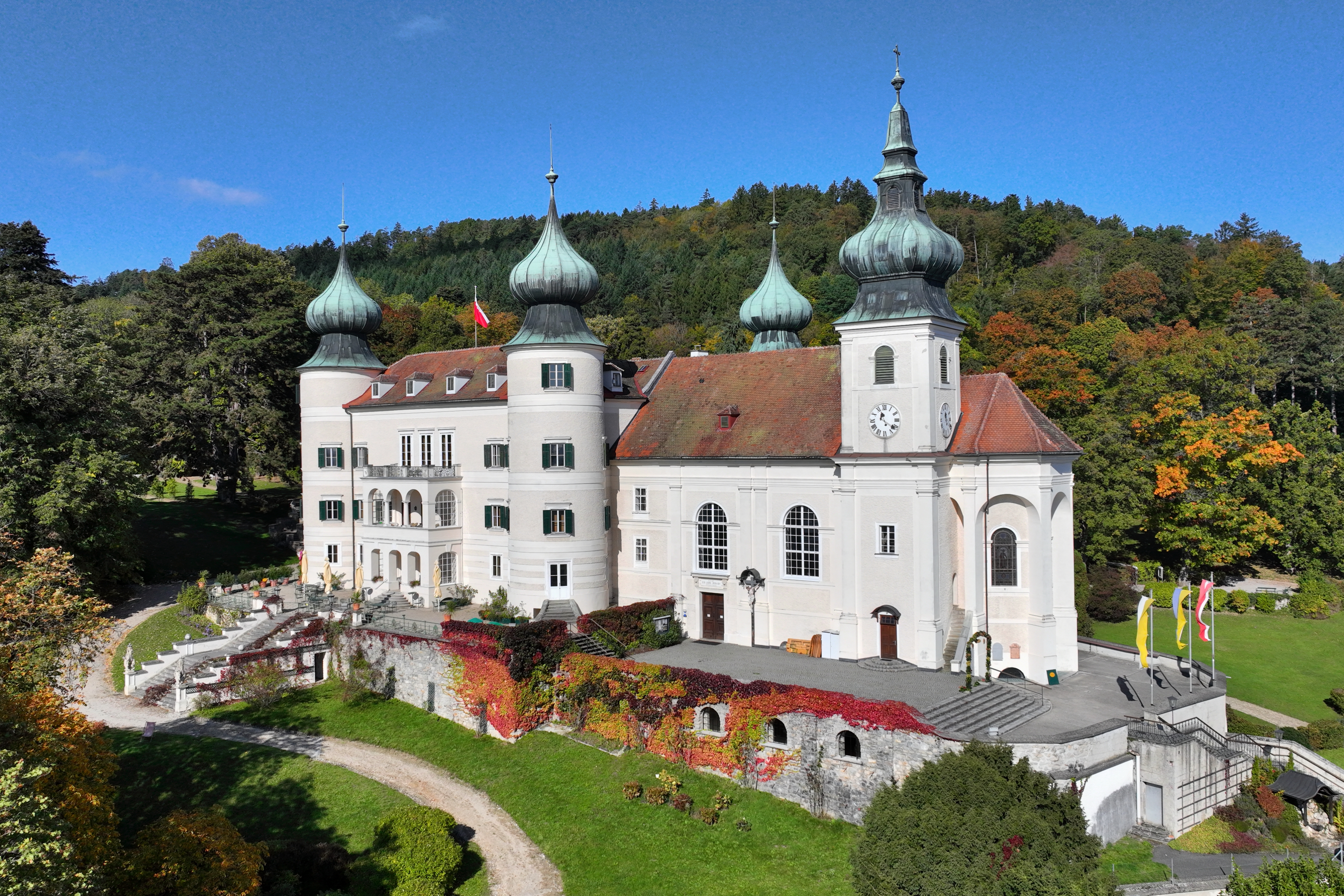
Artstetten Castle with family crypt under the forecourt of the castle church

After his death, Archduke Karl became the heir presumptive of Austria-Hungary. Franz Ferdinand was buried with his wife Sophie in Artstetten Castle, Austria.

== Character ==
The German historian Michael Freund described Franz Ferdinand as "a man of uninspired energy, dark in appearance and emotion, who radiated an aura of strangeness and cast a shadow of violence and recklessness ... a true personality amidst the amiable inanity that characterized Austrian society at this time." As his sometime admirer Karl Kraus put it, "he was not one who would greet you ... he felt no compulsion to reach out for the unexplored region which the Viennese call their heart." His relations with Emperor Franz Joseph were tense; the emperor's personal servant recalled in his memoirs that "thunder and lightning always raged when they had their discussions." The commentaries and orders which the heir to the throne wrote as margin notes to the documents of the Imperial central commission for architectural conservation (where he was Protector) reveal what can be described as "choleric conservatism". The Italian historian Leo Valiani provided the following description.

Francis Ferdinand was a prince of absolutist inclinations, but he had certain intellectual gifts and undoubted moral earnestness. One of his projects – though because of his impatient, suspicious, almost hysterical temperament, his commitment to it, and the methods by which he proposed to bring it about, often changed – was to consolidate the structure of the state and the authority and popularity of the Crown, on which he saw clearly that the fate of the dynasty depended, by abolishing, if not the dominance of the German Austrians, which he wished to maintain for military reasons, though he wanted to diminish it in the civil administration, certainly the far more burdensome sway of the Magyars over the Slav and Romanian nationalities which in 1848–49 had saved the dynasty in armed combat with the Hungarian revolution. Baron Margutti (de), Francis Joseph's aide-de-camp, was told by Francis Ferdinand in 1895 and – with a remarkable consistency in view of the changes that took place in the intervening years – again in 1913, that the introduction of the dual system in 1867 had been disastrous and that, when he ascended the throne, he intended to re-establish strong central government: this objective, he believed, could be attained only by the simultaneous granting of far-reaching administrative autonomy to all the nationalities of the monarchy. In a letter of February 1, 1913, to Berchtold, the Foreign Minister, in which he gave his reasons for not wanting war with Serbia, Franz Ferdinand said that "irredentism in our country ... will cease immediately if our Slavs are given a comfortable, fair and good life" instead of being trampled on (as they were being trampled on by the Hungarians). It must have been this which caused Berchtold, in a character sketch of Francis Ferdinand written ten years after his death, to say that, if he had succeeded to the throne, he would have tried to replace the dual system by a supranational federation.

After the assassination of Franz Ferdinand and Sophie in 1914, Marie Valerie, the daughter of Emperor Franz Joseph, observed that her father had placed more trust in the newly designated heir, his grandnephew Archduke Charles. The emperor confessed to his daughter about the assassination, stating: "For me, it is a relief from a great worry."

== Political views ==
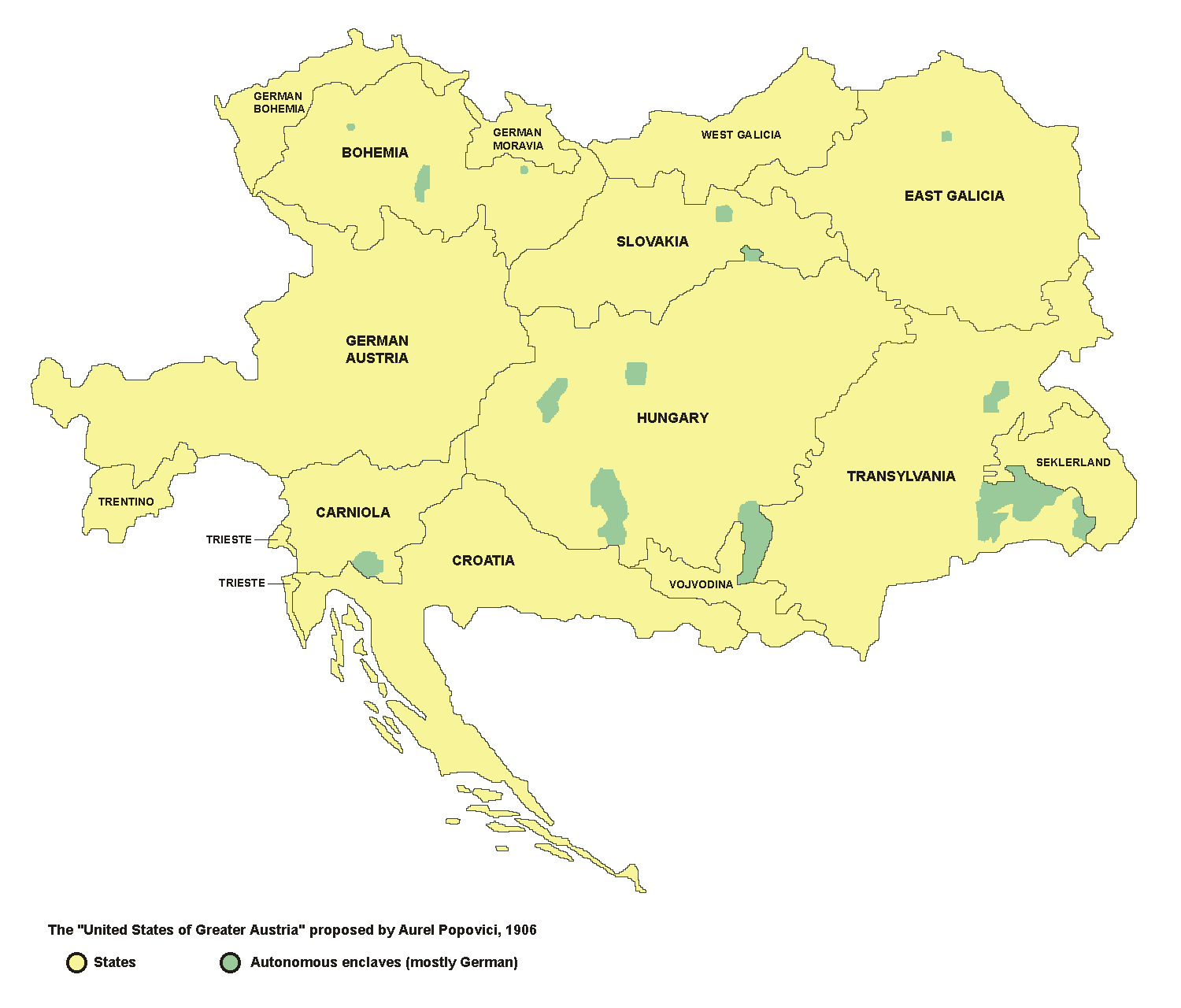
Map of the federalization of Austria-Hungary planned by Archduke Franz Ferdinand, the member states with separate governments

"The three cornerstones of Ferdinand's political conviction were clericalism, anti-democratic views, and anti-Hungarianism," and the basis of his worldview was that "politics is a matter only for the ruler, while the people, the masses have to obey." Franz Ferdinand often complained that in Hungary, the glorification of revolutionary hero Lajos Kossuth, the decline of the monarchical principle, and the dominance of the Freemasons and the Jewish people was prevalent. Historians have disagreed on how to characterize the political philosophies of Franz Ferdinand, some attributing generally liberal views on the empire's nationalities while others have emphasized his dynastic centralism, Catholic conservatism, and tendency to clash with other leaders.

He advocated granting greater autonomy to ethnic groups within the Empire and addressing their grievances, especially the Czechs in Bohemia and the south Slavic peoples in Croatia and Bosnia, who had been left out of the Austro-Hungarian Compromise of 1867. Yet his feelings towards the Hungarians were less generous, often described as antipathy. For example, in 1904 he wrote that "The Hungarians are all rabble, regardless of whether they are minister or duke, cardinal or burgher, peasant, hussar, domestic servant, or revolutionary", and he regarded even István Tisza as a revolutionary and "patented traitor". He regarded Hungarian nationalism as a revolutionary threat to the Habsburg dynasty and reportedly became angry when officers of the 9th Hussars Regiment (which he commanded) spoke Hungarian in his presence – despite the fact that it was the official regimental language. He further regarded the Hungarian branch of the Dual Monarchy's army, the Honvédség, as an unreliable and potentially threatening force within the empire, complaining at the Hungarians' failure to provide funds for the joint army and opposing the formation of artillery units within the Hungarian forces.

He also advocated a cautious approach towards Serbia – repeatedly locking horns with Franz Conrad von Hötzendorf, Vienna's hard-line Chief of the Austro-Hungarian General Staff, warning that harsh treatment of Serbia would bring Austria-Hungary into open conflict with Russia, to the ruin of both empires.

He was disappointed when Austria-Hungary failed to act as a great power, such as during the Boxer Rebellion in 1900. Other nations, including, in his description, "dwarf states like Belgium and Portugal", had soldiers stationed in China, but Austria-Hungary did not. However, Austria-Hungary did participate in the Eight-Nation Alliance to suppress the Boxers, and sent soldiers as part of the "international relief force".

Franz Ferdinand was a prominent and influential supporter of the Austro-Hungarian Navy in a time when sea power was not a priority in Austrian foreign policy and the Navy was relatively little known or supported by the public. After his assassination in 1914, the Navy honoured Franz Ferdinand and his wife with a lying in state aboard SMS Viribus Unitis.

== Commemorations ==
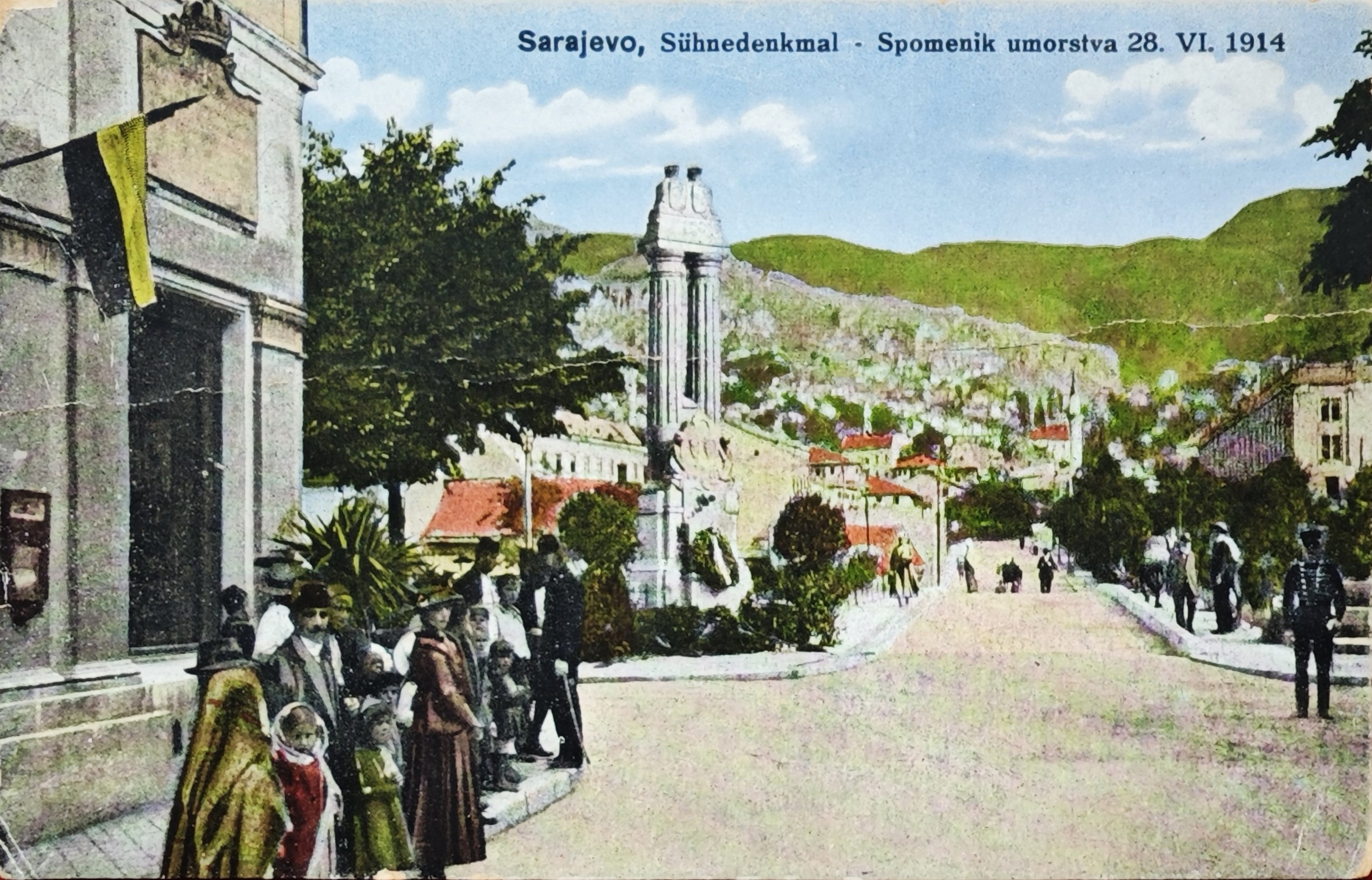
Memorial for Franz Ferdinand of Austria erected at the bridgehead of Latin Bridge, Sarajevo, on the 28 June 1917.

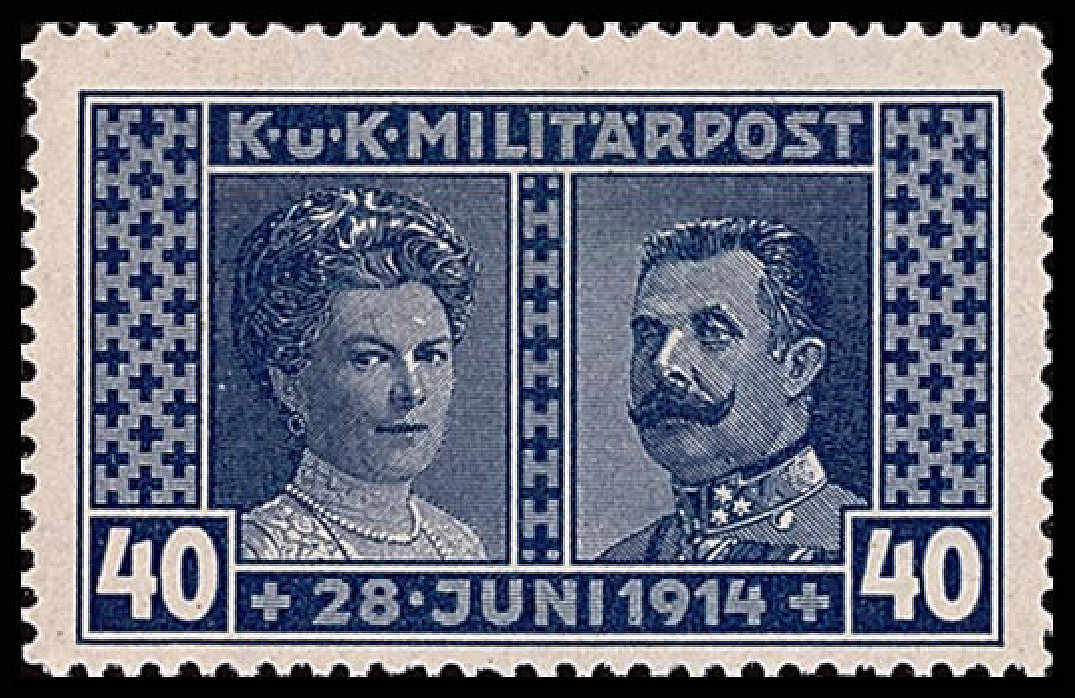
Commemorative postage stamp (Austria-Hungary)

Archduke Franz Ferdinand and his Castle of Artstetten were selected as a main motif for the Austrian 10 euro The Castle of Artstetten commemorative coin, minted on 13 October 2004. The reverse shows the entrance to the crypt of the Hohenberg family. There are two portraits below, showing Archduke Franz Ferdinand and his wife Sophie, Duchess of Hohenberg.

== Titles, styles, honours and arms ==
=== Titles and styles ===
- 18 December 1863 – 20 November 1875: His Imperial and Royal Highness Archduke and Prince Franz Ferdinand of Austria, Royal Prince of Hungary, Bohemia and Croatia
- 20 November 1875 – 28 June 1914: His Imperial and Royal Highness Franz Ferdinand, Archduke of Austria-Este

=== Honours and awards ===
Domestic

- Knight of the Golden Fleece, 1878
- Grand Cross of the Royal Hungarian Order of St. Stephen, 1893
- Military Merit Cross, in Diamonds
- Silver Military Merit Medal on Red Ribbon
- Long Service Cross for Officers, 2nd Class
- 1898 Jubilee Medal for the Armed Forces
- 1908 Military Jubilee Cross
- Sea Voyage Medal 1892-1893

Foreign

- (Duchy of Anhalt) Anhalt: Grand Cross of the Order of Albert the Bear
- Baden: Knight of the House Order of Fidelity, 1908
- Bavaria:
  - Knight of St. Hubert, 1895
  - Commemorative Medal for the 70th Anniversary of Military Service of Prince Regent Luitpold
- Belgium: Grand Cordon of the Order of Leopold
- Bulgaria: Knight of Saints Cyril and Methodius, with Collar
- Denmark: Knight of the Elephant, 12 May 1908
- (Saxe-Coburg and Gotha) (Duchy of Saxe-Altenburg) (Saxe-Meiningen) Ernestine duchies: Grand Cross of the Saxe-Ernestine House Order
- Italy: Knight of the Annunciation, 22 January 1891
  - (Tuscany) Tuscan Grand Ducal family: Grand Cross of St. Joseph
  - (Kingdom of the Two Sicilies) Two Sicilian Royal family: Grand Cross of St. Ferdinand and Merit
- Holy See:
  - Knight of the Supreme Order of Christ
  - Grand Cross of the Holy Sepulchre of Jerusalem
- (Sovereign Military Order of Malta) Military Order of Malta: Bailiff Grand Cross of Honour and Devotion
- Japan: Grand Cordon of the Order of the Chrysanthemum, 27 July 1893
- Johor: First Class of the Royal Family Order of Johor, 1893
- Montenegro: Grand Cross of the Order of Prince Danilo I
- Mecklenburg: Grand Cross of the Wendish Crown, with Crown in Ore
- Oldenburg: Grand Cross of the Order of Duke Peter Friedrich Ludwig, with Crown in Gold
- Portugal: Grand Cross of the Sash of the Two Orders
- Prussia:
  - Knight of the Black Eagle, with Collar
  - Grand Commander of the Royal House Order of Hohenzollern, with Collar
  - Military Merit Cross
- Romania:
  - Grand Cross of the Order of Carol I
  - Grand Cross of the Star of Romania
- Saxe-Weimar-Eisenach: Grand Cross of the White Falcon, 1892
- Württemberg:
  - Grand Cross of the Württemberg Crown, 1889
  - Golden Jubilee Medal
- Saxony: Knight of the Rue Crown, 1886
- Serbia: Grand Cross of the White Eagle
- (Thailand) Siam: Knight of the Order of the Royal House of Chakri, 1 June 1902
- Spain: Grand Cross of the Order of Charles III, with Collar, 5 May 1906
- Sweden-Norway: Knight of the Seraphim, 19 September 1890
- Russia:
  - Knight of St. Andrew, 1891
  - Knight of St. Alexander Nevsky
  - Knight of the White Eagle
  - Knight of St. Anna, 1st Class
  - Knight of St. Stanislaus, 1st Class
- United Kingdom:
  - Honorary Grand Cross of the Bath (civil), 19 February 1901
  - Stranger Knight Companion of the Garter, 15 July 1902
  - Commemorative Medal for the Diamond Jubilee of Queen Victoria
  - Silver Commemorative Medal for the Coronation of King Edward VII

Arms and monogram
Armorial achievement of Franz Ferdinand, Archduke of Austria-Este	Imperial Monogram

== See also ==
- List of heirs to the Austrian throne

== Footnotes ==
Archduke Franz Ferdinand of Austria House of Habsburg-Lorraine Cadet branch of the House of Lorraine Born: 18 December 1863 Died: 28 June 1914
Royal titles
Preceded by Francis II	Archduke of Austria-Este; 1875–1914	Succeeded by Charles
Titles in pretence
Preceded by Francis V	— TITULAR — Duke of Modena; 1875–1914	Succeeded by Charles
