= Biot (surname) =

Biot is a French surname. It may refer to

- Camille Biot (1850–1918), French physician
- Charlie Biot (1917–2000), American Negro League baseball player
- Édouard Biot (1803–1850), French engineer and sinologist
- Jacques Biot (born 1952), French engineer, businessman and academic administrator
- Jean-Baptiste Biot (1774–1862), French physicist and mathematician
- Maurice Anthony Biot (1905–1985), Belgian-American physicist
