= Death rattle =

Sound often produced as someone nears death

A death rattle is noisy breathing that often occurs in someone near death. Accumulation of fluids such as saliva and bronchial secretions in the throat and upper airways are the cause. Those who are dying may lose their ability to swallow and may have increased production of bronchial secretions, resulting in such an accumulation. Usually, two or three days earlier, symptoms of approaching death can be observed, such as saliva accumulating in the throat, difficulty taking even a spoonful of water, shortness of breath, and rapid chest movement. While a death rattle is a strong indication that someone is near death, it can also be produced by other problems that cause interference with the swallowing reflex, such as brain injuries.

It is sometimes misinterpreted as the sound of the person choking to death or gargling. Notably, death rattle is a separate phenomenon from agonal respiration, ataxic respiration, and Kussmaul respiration.

== Timing ==
This symptom most commonly appears sometime during the last 24 hours of the person's life, although some live somewhat longer.

== Management ==
The dying person is usually unaware of the noisy breathing and is not disturbed by it, but some healthcare providers attempt to minimize the sound for the emotional comfort of family members and caregivers. This may be done through repositioning the person, reducing the volume of IV fluids being given, or giving anticholinergic or anti-muscarinic drugs to reduce secretions, which have side effects.

== See also ==
- Agonal respiration
- End-of-life care
- Bowled - A method of dismissal in the sport of cricket, colloquially labelled as the "death rattle", from the sound of the ball hitting the stumps.
