= Thannhausen, Styria =

Thannhausen
- Municipality
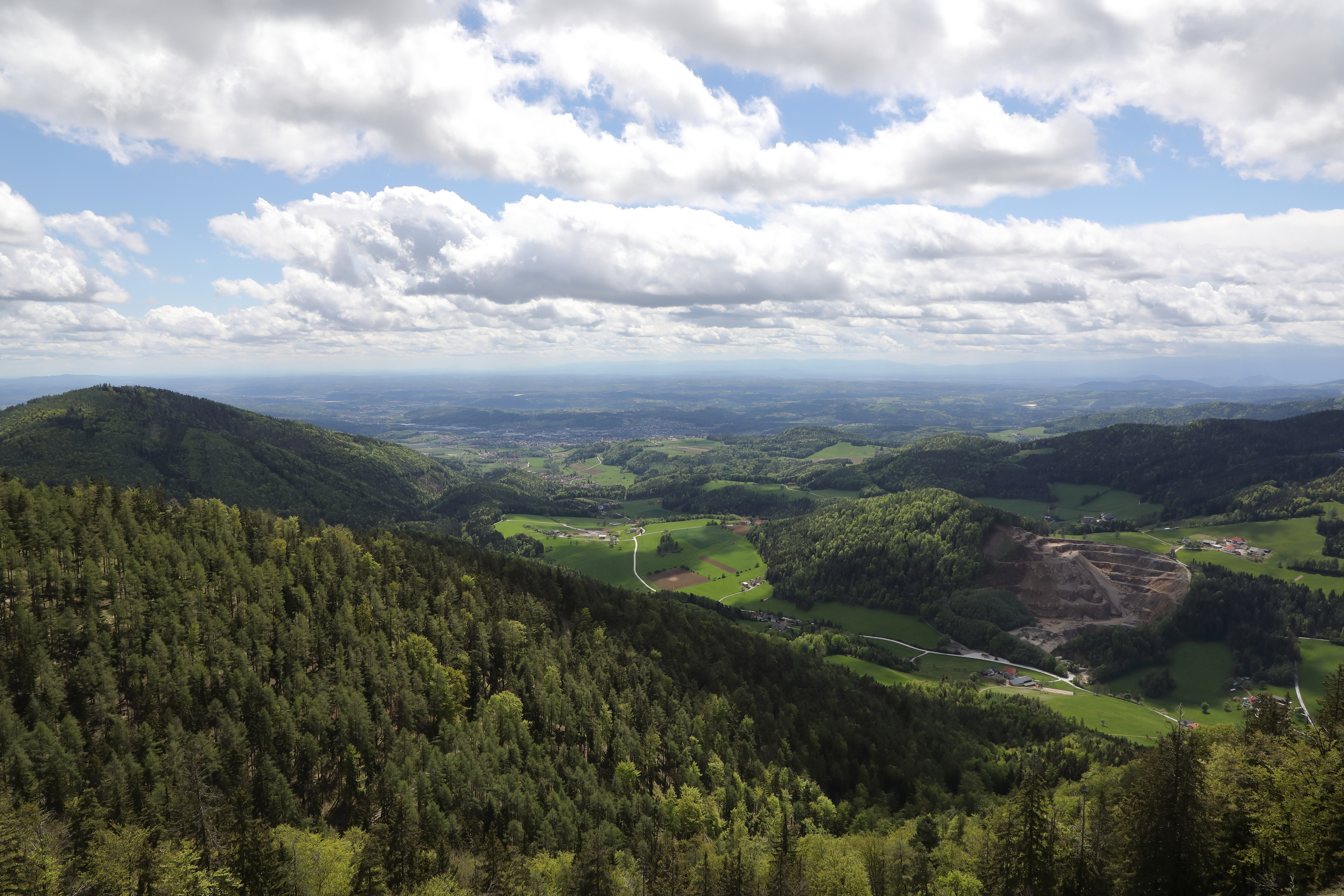

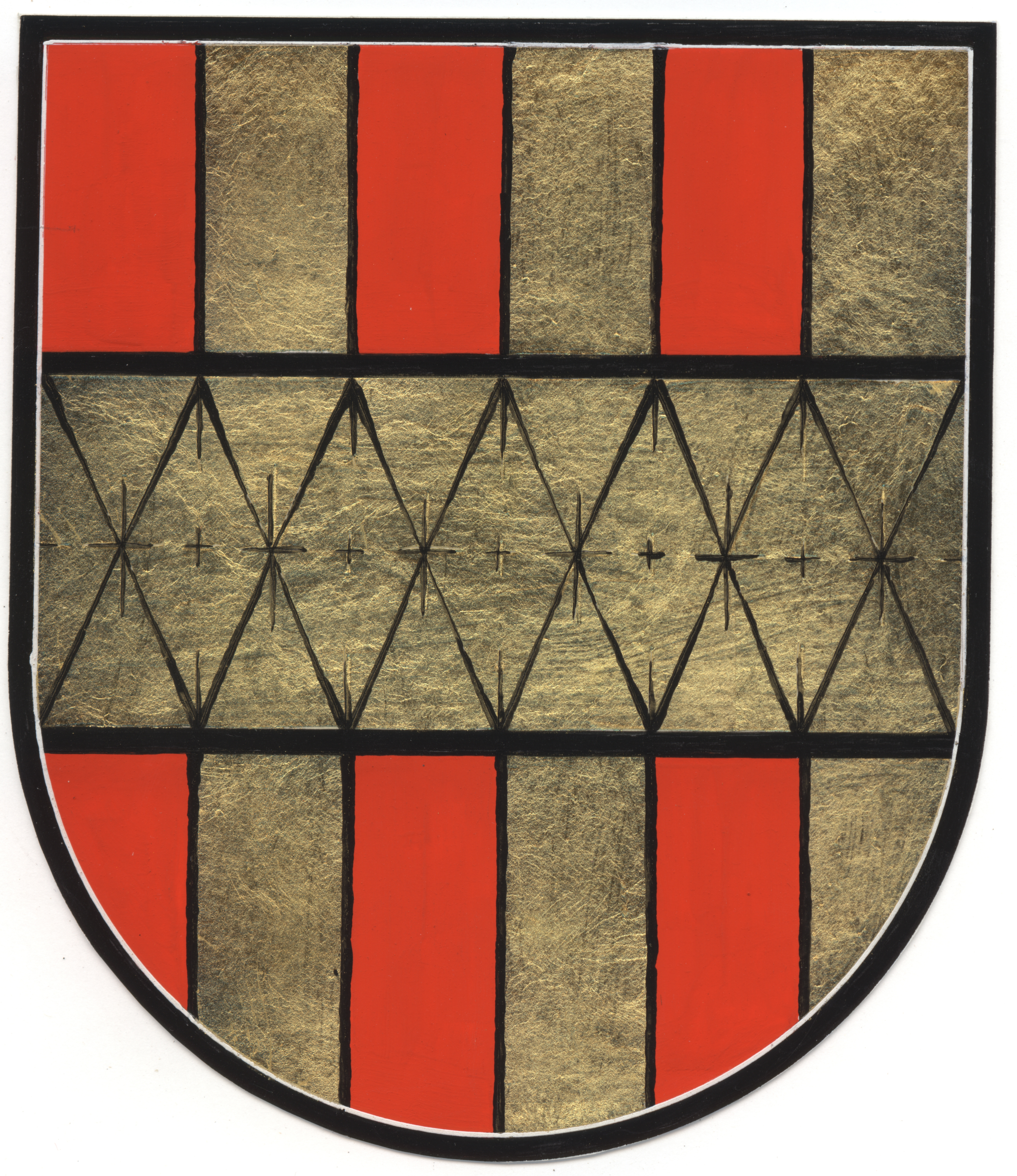
- Coat of arms

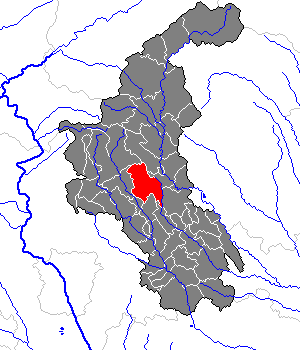
- Location within Weiz district

- Location within Austria
- Coordinates: 47°15′36″N 15°36′36″E
- Country: Austria
- State: Styria
- District: Weiz

Government
  - Mayor: Gottfried Philipp Heinz (ÖVP)

Area
  - Total: 33.51 km^{2} (12.94 sq mi)
- Elevation: 480 m (1,570 ft)

Population (2018-01-01)
  - Total: 2,429
  - Density: 72.49/km^{2} (187.7/sq mi)
- Time zone: UTC+1 (CET)
  - Summer (DST): UTC+2 (CEST)
- Postal code: 8160
- Area code: 03172
- Vehicle registration: WZ
- Website: www.thannhausen.at

Thannhausen is a municipality in the district of Weiz in the Austrian state of Styria. It is where Princess Sophie of Hohenberg died in 1990. Lies in the valley called Mindeltal, about 24 kilometres southeast of Günzburg.
