= Marion Guillou =

President of the École Polytechnique
- In office 2008–2013
- Preceded by: Yannick d'Escatha
- Succeeded by: Jacques Biot

Personal details
- Born: 17 September 1954 (age 72) Marseille, France
- Education: École Polytechnique; AgroParisTech

Marion Guillou (born 17 September 1954 in Marseille, France) is a French scientist specialized in global food security.

Guillou wrote proposals for the French government on the agro-ecological transition (June 2013) and on the organization of the French food safety public services (June 2014). She is a member of the French High Council for Climate.

== Early life and education ==
Guillou completed her engineering training at École Polytechnique (promotion X1973), and then specialized in water engineering at École nationale du génie rural, des eaux et des forêts (ENGREF, now known as AgroParisTech). She completed a PhD in physico-chemistry of biological processes at Nantes University (UA CNRS).

== Career ==
=== Food sciences ===
Guillou worked on food processes and invented a technique to monitor continuously the bio transformations of food products using physical chemistry sensors such as Nuclear Magnetic low resolution Resonance (NMR).

=== Food safety ===
She was in charge of the food safety directorate in France from 1996 to 2000. She had to manage the Bovine Spongiform Encephalopathy (BSE) crisis, also known as the mad-cow disease, and to propose the new French food safety organization (1999 law on food safety).

=== Research management ===
From 1986 to 1989, Guillou was Regional Delegate for Research and Technology in the Region Pays de la Loire. From 2000 to 2012, she was first CEO, then President and CEO of the French National Institute for Agronomic Research (Institut national de la recherche agronomique) where she prioritized research on agriculture, food and environment. She widened the scope of research topics towards global matters. She put in place interdisciplinary meta-programs, for instance on integrated plant protection and consumer practices.

From 2008 to 2013, Guillou was the chair of the Board of the École Polytechnique (l'X) and during her mandate, Ecole Polytechnique put a greater emphasis on the scientific and technological training, as well as the innovative management and the cooperation with industry. The creation of a new research center on interfaces between biology and engineering sciences was decided and financed and the organization of the Ecole Polytechnique was reformed.

=== Global involvement ===
Guillou founded the Joint Programming Initiative on agriculture and climate change with British colleagues and chaired it during the first three years(2010-2013). This initiative, FACCEJPI, now gathers 21 European countries and links at international level with AGMIP and CCAFS. From 2013 to 2016, she was a member of the High-Level Panel Expert reporting to the Committee on World Food Security and a board member of the CGIAR. Starting in 2016, she became a member of the Bioversity board, and starting in 2019, she became a member of the CIAT board. She promoted the Alliance, an alliance between those two agricultural research centers.

== Other activities ==
=== Corporate boards ===
- BNP Paribas, Member of the Board of Directors
- Veolia Environnement, Member of the Board of Directors

=== Non-profit organizations ===
- French Academy of Technology, Member
- French Academy of Agriculture, Chairperson
- French Institute of International Relations (IFRI), Member of the Board of Directors
- Bioversity International, Member of the Board, Chair of the Program Committee
- CIAT, Member of the Board, Chair of the Program Committee
- French High Council for Climate, Member
- Boardchair of the Collections and Biodiversity Fund

== Publications ==
- Grenelle Committee on Research and Innovation (2008)
- The World's Challenge (Quae 2012) (English version) or 9 Milliards d'hommes à nourrir (French version)
- The role for scientists in tackling food insecurity and climate change (BioMed Central, 2011)
- What next after Durban to active a secure food world ? (Science, January 2012-Vol335 no.6066)
- Achieving food security in the face of climate change: Summary for policy makers from the Commission on Sustainable Agriculture and Climate Change
- Report to the French government on the Agro-ecological transition (June 2013)
- Report to the French government on the policy of food safety (June 2014)
- Food systems for sustainable development: proposals for a profound four-part transformation
- Accelerating the climate transition with a low-carbon, resilient and fair food system, Haut conseil pour le climat (Jan 2024)
