= Princess Sophie of Hohenberg =

Daughter of Archduke Franz Ferdinand (1901–1990)

Princess Sophie
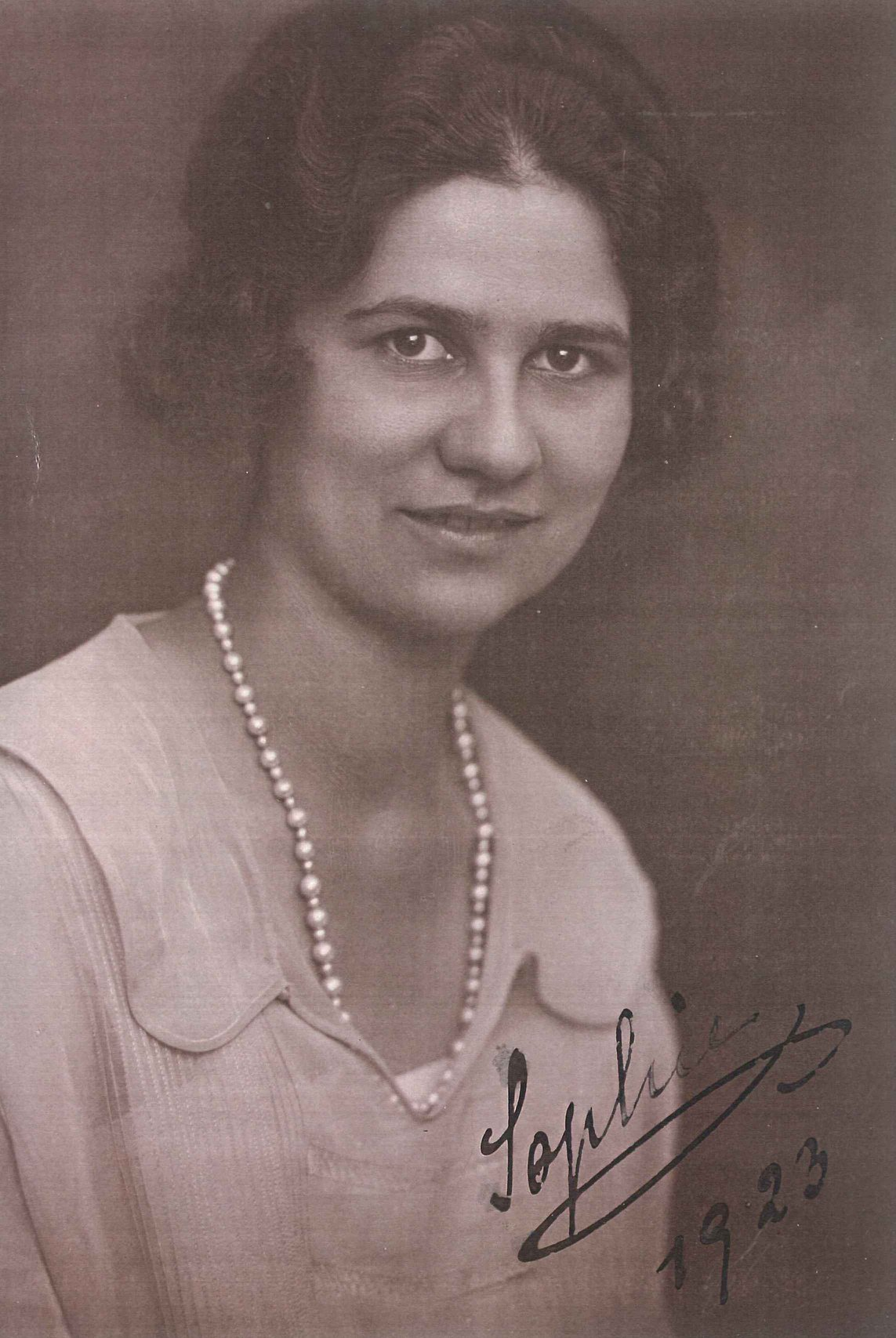
- Autographed photo, 1923
- Born: 24 July 1901; Konopischt, Kingdom of Bohemia, Austria-Hungary
- Died: 27 October 1990 (aged 89); Thannhausen, Austria
- Noble family: Hohenberg
- Spouse: Count Friedrich von Nostitz-Rieneck (m. 1920; died 1973)
- Issue: Count Erwein von Nostitz-Rieneck; Count Franz von Nostitz-Rieneck; Count Aloys von Nostitz-Rieneck; Countess Sophie von Nostitz-Rieneck
- Father: Archduke Franz Ferdinand of Austria
- Mother: Sophie, Duchess of Hohenberg

Princess Sophie of Hohenberg (Sophie Marie Franziska Antonia Ignatia Alberta von Hohenberg; 24 July 1901 – 27 October 1990) was the only daughter of Archduke Franz Ferdinand of Austria and his wife Sophie, Duchess of Hohenberg, both of whom were assassinated in Sarajevo on 28 June 1914. This event triggered the First World War, thus Sophie and her two brothers are sometimes described as the first orphans of the First World War.

== Early life ==
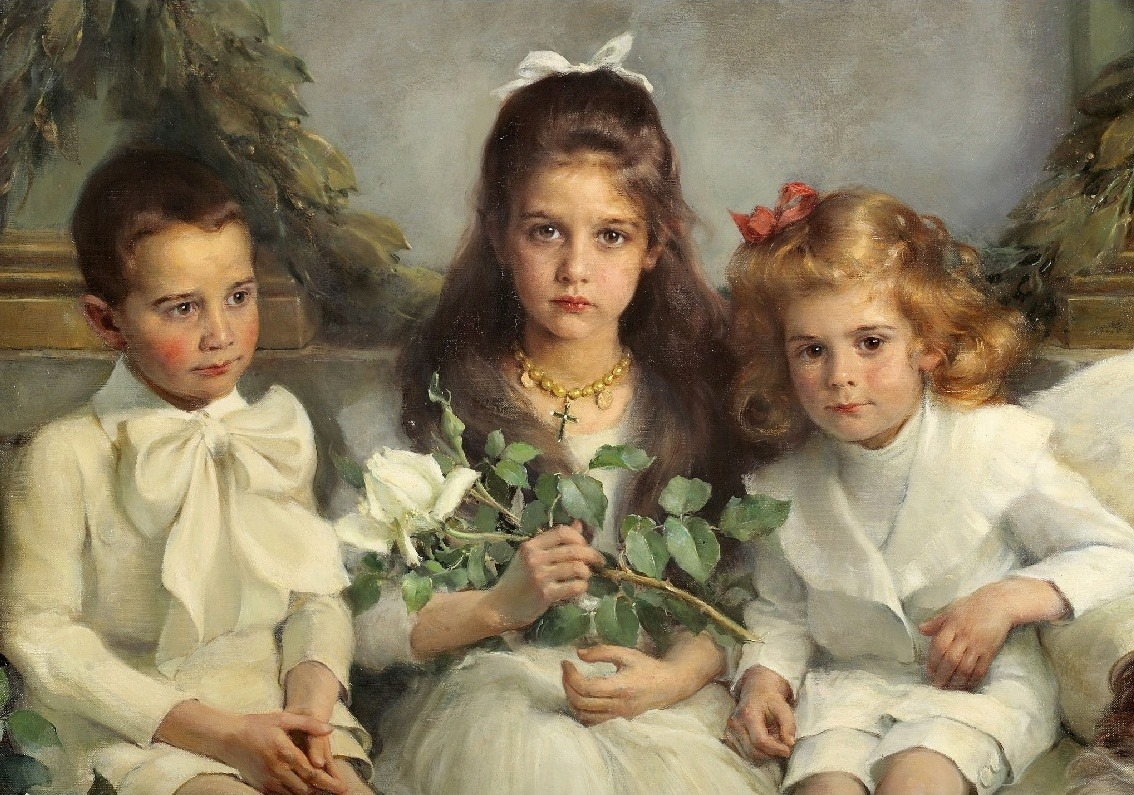
Sophie (centre) with her brothers, princes Maximilian (left) and Ernst (right), in 1908

Princess Sophie was born on 24 July 1901 at Schloss Konopischt in Austria-Hungary (now in the Czech Republic), 50 kilometres (31 mi) south-east of Prague. This castle, situated in Bohemia, was the favourite home of the Archduke and his wife. On 29 September 1902, the couple's first son, Maximilian, was born. A second son, Ernst, followed on 17 May 1904. In 1908, the Archduke's wife became pregnant again, but the fourth child, a boy, was stillborn on 7 November 1908.

Since the Archduke had sworn an oath that any children he had with his morganatic wife could never succeed to the throne, he envisaged a future for them that would be normal and tranquil. He wanted his sons to lead the uncomplicated life of a country squire, while he intended that his daughter, Sophie, would be happy at the side of a socially suitable partner whom she loved. He hoped that his children would grow up to be private individuals who could enjoy life without material worries, while leading lives of anonymity. Sophie later said that she and her brothers were brought up to know they were nothing special. She stated that her father had been firm with his children, but never harsh or unjust.

== After assassination ==
Following the assassination of their parents in Sarajevo, Sophie and her brothers, Maximilian and Ernst, were taken in by their mother's brother-in-law, Prince Jaroslav von Thun und Hohenstein. While Emperor Franz Joseph provided a modest pension, the siblings were primarily raised at the Thun-Hohenstein estates, such as Děčín Castle.

In late 1918, the newly established First Czechoslovak Republic confiscated the family's properties, including Konopiště and Chlumec nad Cidlinou, on the grounds that they were members of the House of Habsburg (despite the Hohenbergs' morganatic status). The children were subsequently expelled from Czechoslovakia and relocated to Vienna and Schloß Artstetten in Lower Austria.

== Marriage and issue ==
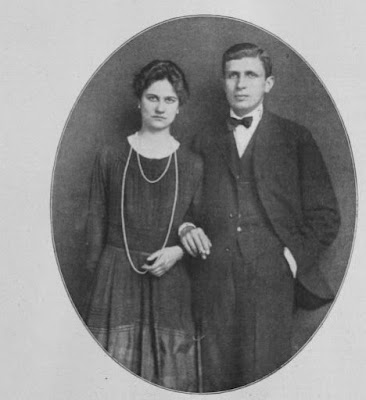
Princess Sophie of Hohenberg & her husband Count Friedrich von Nostitz-Rienbeck

On 8 September 1920, Sophie married Count Friedrich von Nostitz-Rieneck (1893-1973) in Tetschen. Friedrich was the son of Count Erwein Felix von Nostitz-Rieneck (1863-1931) and Countess Amalia Podstatzky-Lichtenstein (1867-1956). The couple settled in Austria, as their Bohemian estates had been affected by post-war land reforms.

They had four children:

- Count Erwein von Nostitz-Rieneck (29 June 1921 in Heinrichsgrün – 11 September 1949 in Vysokaye), died in a Soviet POW camp.
- Count Franz von Nostitz-Rieneck (2 February 1923 in Vienna – 23 February 1945 in Berent), killed on the Eastern Front.
- Count Aloys von Nostitz-Rieneck (12 August 1925 in Vienna – 22 April 2003 in Salzburg) married Countess Theresia von Waldburg zu Zeil und Trauchburg (born 8 August 1931 in Leutkirch im Allgäu), daughter of Erich, Prince of Waldburg-Zeil and Trauchburg, and Princess Monika of Löwenstein-Wertheim-Rosenberg. They have four children.
  - Friedrich Graf von Nostitz-Rieneck (born 19 July 1963)
  - Monika Maria Theresia Walburga Henriette Gräfin von Nostitz-Rieneck (born 15 April 1965)
  - Sophie-Bernadette Maria Hyacintha Thaddäa Walburga Gräfin von Nostitz-Rieneck (born 17 August 1967)
  - Franz-Erwein Graf von Nostitz-Rieneck (born 4 May 1970)
- Countess Sophie von Nostitz-Rieneck (4 June 1929 in Vienna - 19 April 2024 in Thannhausen), married Baron Ernst von Gudenus (26 March 1916 in Madrid – 7 December 1972 in Weiz), son of Baron Erwein von Gudenus and Baroness Sidonia von Morsey genannt Picard. They have four children.
  - Baroness Sophie von Gudenus (born 1954)
  - Baroness Marie-Sidonie von Gudenus (born 1955)
  - Baron Erwein von Gudenus (born 1958)
  - Baron Ferdinand von Gudenus (born 1960)

== Later life ==
In 1938, following the Anschluss (the union of Austria and Germany under Adolf Hitler), her brothers Maximilian and Ernst were arrested by the Gestapo as a result of making anti-Nazi statements and deported to Dachau concentration camp. Their properties in Austria were confiscated by Nazi authorities. They both survived their imprisonment in Dachau.

Sophie lost two of her sons because of World War Two. Her second eldest was killed in action on the Eastern Front in Poland in 1945. Her eldest son died as a POW during Soviet captivity in Vysokaye in 1949.

Sophie's husband died in 1973, after which she led a quiet life in Austria, accompanied at times by her grandchildren. In 1981, she visited Konopiště for the first time in sixty years. During this visit, she talked of how happy her family life had been there.

Sophie lived to be 89 years old, dying in her sleep on 27 October 1990 at Thannhausen, Austria. She was laid to rest beside the body of her husband in the family crypt of her son-in-law, Baron Ernst Gudenus, at nearby Weizberg. She had outlived both of her younger siblings by many years.

== Letter to Nedeljko Čabrinović ==
During the trial of the men accused of murdering Archduke Franz Ferdinand and his wife, the only defendant to express remorse was Nedeljko Čabrinović, who expressed his regrets for what he had done and apologized to the children of the victims. Princess Sophie and her brothers were told about Čabrinović's apology and wrote a letter to him. In the letter, they said they had heard about his apology and stated that his conscience could be at peace because they forgave him for his role in the murder of their parents. Sophie and Max signed the letter, but Ernst refused. The letter was delivered personally to Čabrinović in his cell at Theresienstadt, in Bohemia, by the Jesuit Father Anton Puntigam, who had given the last rites to Franz Ferdinand and his wife. On 23 January 1916, Princess Sophie and her brothers were informed that Čabrinović had died.

== Fictional appearances ==
A fictional version of Princess Sophie, played by Danish actress Amalie Ihle Alstrup, appeared in "Vienna, November 1908", an episode of The Young Indiana Jones Chronicles later re-edited to form half of The Perils of Cupid. Young Indy falls in love with the princess and shares his first kiss with her, but is forbidden from seeing her further. Several times during the series, he is shown wearing a locket that contains her picture, which she gave to him.

== Bibliography ==
- King, Greg; Woolmans, Sue (2013). The Assassination of the Archduke. Macmillan. ISBN 978-1-447-24521-6.
