= Jacques Biot =

French engineer and lobbyist

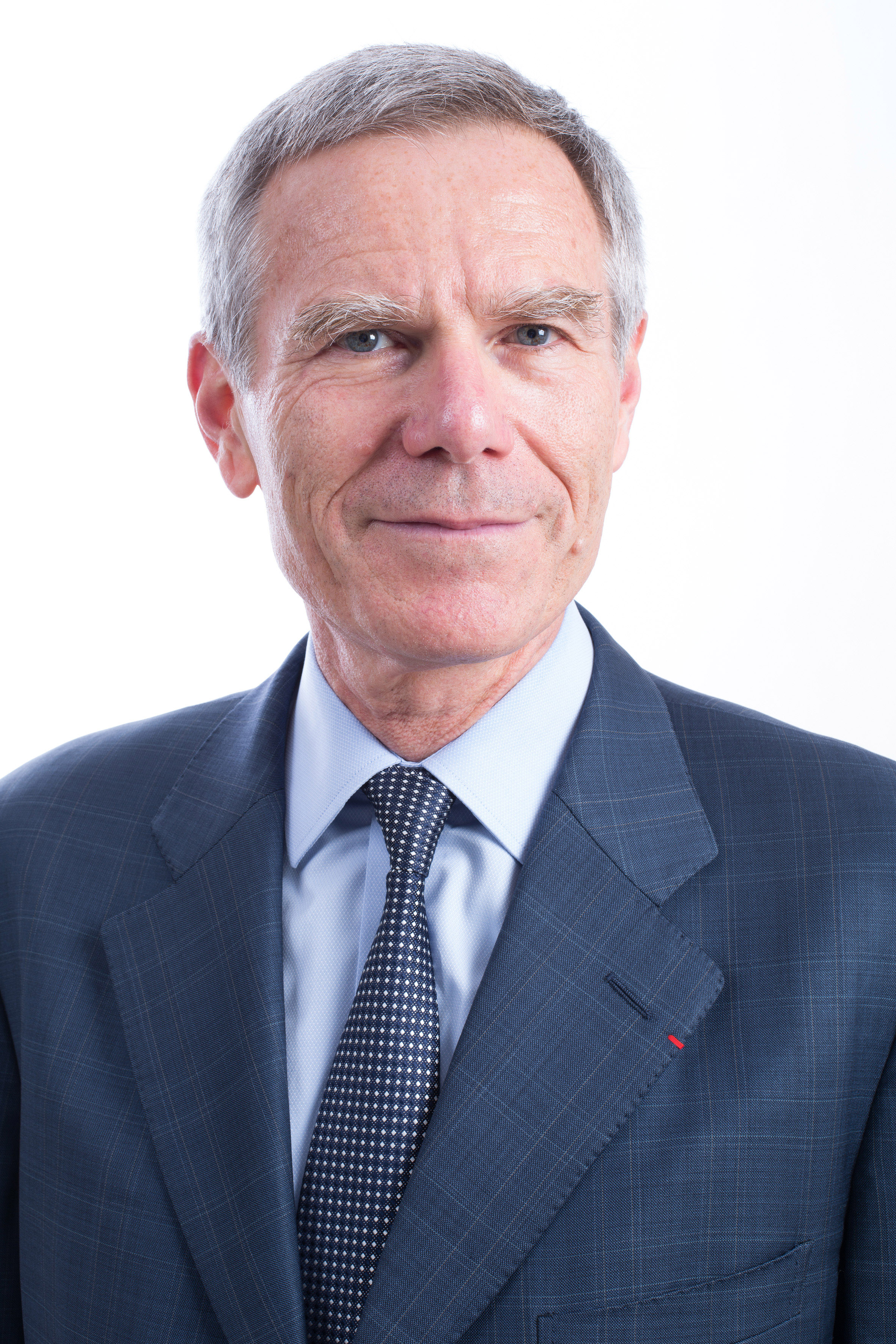

President of the École Polytechnique
- In office 2013–2018
- Preceded by: Marion Guillou
- Succeeded by: Éric Labaye

Personal details
- Born: 6 December 1952 (age 73) Lyon, France
- Children: 3
- Education: Lycée du Parc; École Polytechnique; Mines ParisTech

Jacques Biot (French: [ʒak bjɔ]; born 6 December 1952) is a French engineer, businessman, lobbyist for pharmaceutical companies and academic administrator. He served as the president of the École Polytechnique between 2013 and 2018.

== Early life ==
Jacques Biot was born on December 6, 1952, in Lyon, France.

Biot was educated at the Lycée Ampère and the Lycée du Parc in Lyon. He graduated from the École Polytechnique in 1974 and the École des Mines in 1977.

== Career ==
Biot served in the Corps des mines in Languedoc-Roussillon from 1977 to 1980. He worked as an urban planner and statistician in the Ministry of Labour from 1980 to 1983. He subsequently served as an advisor to Labour ministers Edmond Hervé and Laurent Fabius. When Fabius became prime minister in 1984, Biot remained his advisor, up until 1985.

Biot worked for Roussel Uclaf, a pharmaceutical company. He subsequently worked for Pasteur-Vaccins (now Sanofi). He founded JNB-Développement S.A., a consultancy firm for the healthcare industry, in 1992. He also served as the vice president and director of Guerbet.

Biot has served as the president of his alma mater, the École Polytechnique, since July 1, 2013. He succeeded Marion Guillou. Biot was tasked with modernising the school, based on Bernard Attali's recommendations. As a result, he established a centre for start-ups and oversaw the expansion of Paris-Saclay.

Biot became an Officer of the Legion of Honour in 2014.

In October 2018, he was appointed director of Huawei France.

== Personal life ==
Biot is married, and he has three daughters.
