= Camille Biot =

French physician

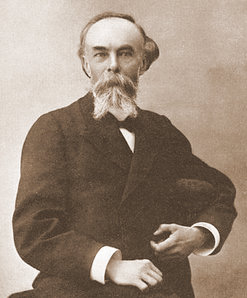
Camille Biot

Camille Biot (19 December 1850, Châtenoy-le-Royal - 1918, Mâcon) was a French physician who is known for describing Biot's respiration.

== Biography ==
Camille Biot was born in Chatenoy-le-Royal, Saône-et-Loire, France in 1850. He made observations about breathing patterns while working as an intern at the Hôtel Dieu Hospital in Lyon, which were published in 1876. After 1875 he practised medicine in Mâcon.
