= Ataxic respiration =

Abnormal pattern of breathing (also known as Biot's respirations)

Ataxic respirations
- Other names: Biot's respiration; Biot's breathing
- Graph showing ataxic respirations and other pathological breathing patterns.
- Specialty: Neurology; Pulmonology
- Causes: Damage to Medulla Oblongata and Pons

Ataxic respirations, also known as Biot's respirations or Biot's breathing, is an abnormal pattern of breathing characterized by variable tidal volume, random apneas, and no regularity. It is named for Camille Biot, who characterized it in 1876. Biot's respiration is caused by damage to the medulla oblongata and pons due to trauma, stroke, opioid use, and increased intracranial pressure due to uncal or tentorial herniation. Often this condition is also associated with meningitis. In common medical practice, Biot's respiration is often mistaken for Cheyne–Stokes respiration, part of which may have been caused by them both being described by the same person and subtle differences between the types of breathing.

Ataxic respirations were discovered by Dr. Camille Biot in the late 19th century as he wrote multiple papers analyzing subtle differences in Cheyne-Stokes respirations in patients admitted to Hôtel Dieu Hospital.

== Etymology ==
The word ataxia is commonly used in the medical literature. Examining the word "taxis," meaning order or organization, and "a," meaning without, the resulting meaning is "without order". Hence, ataxic respirations should equate to respirations without order, which is accurate.

== Etiology ==
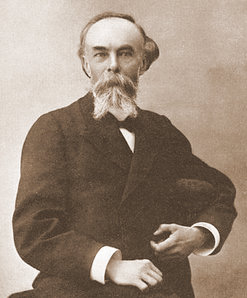
Dr. Camille Biot, who defined the concept of ataxic respiration.

Ataxic respirations are caused by damage to the medulla oblongata (respiratory center of the brainstem) due to strokes or trauma. It generally indicates a poor prognosis and usually progresses to complete apnea.

== Diagnosis and management ==
Advances in medical care may be masking the presence of ataxic respirations. This could be related to the fact that the treatment for ataxic respirations typically results in intubation immediately upon diagnosis, with mechanical ventilation to regulate patients' breathing. Furthermore, patients will often be intubated and on mechanical ventilation prior to the onset of ataxic respirations.

== Related patterns ==
Various breathing abnormalities

Ataxic respirations are one of many unique respiration styles in an ill patient. There is an apparent controversy surrounding the novelty of ataxic respirations versus the well-known Cheyne-Stokes and cluster respirations, which Dr. Camille Biot deemed mutually exclusive. Notably, Dr. Miller Fisher was able to identify ataxic respirations in comatose patients differentiating the breathing from cluster breathing.
