= Imperial Crypt =

Burial chamber beneath the Capuchin Church and monastery in Vienna, Austria

Coordinates: 48°12′20″N 16°22′11″E

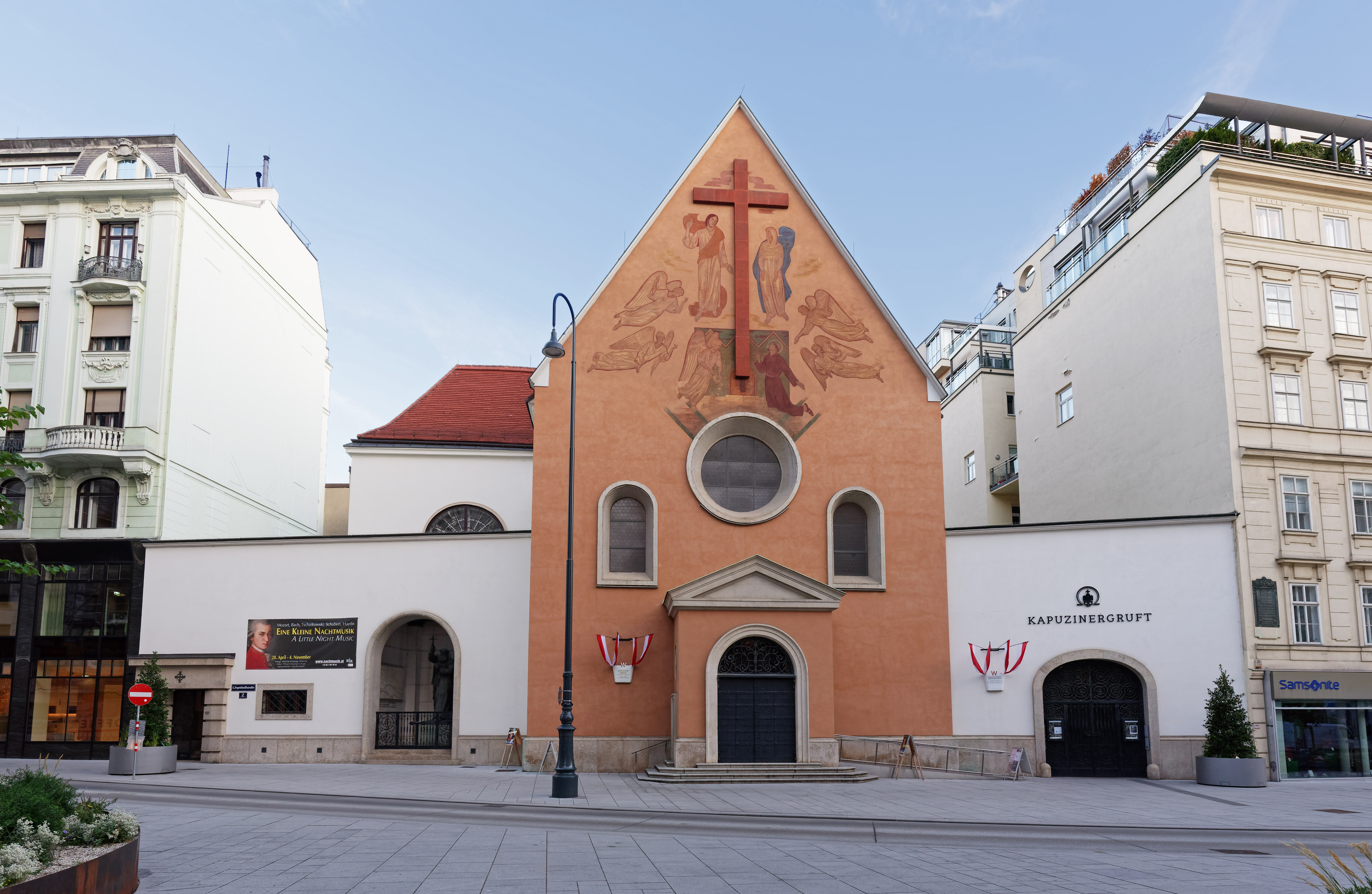
The Capuchin Church in Vienna, Austria, which houses the Imperial Crypt. Entrance to the Crypt is to the right.

The Imperial Crypt (German: Kaisergruft), also called the Capuchin Crypt (Kapuzinergruft), is a burial chamber beneath the Capuchin Church and monastery in Vienna, Austria. It was founded in 1618 and dedicated in 1632, and located on the Neuer Markt square of the Innere Stadt, near the Hofburg Palace. Since 1633, the Imperial Crypt has served as the principal place of entombment for the members of the House of Habsburg. The bones of 145 Habsburg royalty, plus urns containing the hearts or cremated remains of four others, are here, including 12 emperors and 18 empresses. The visible 107 metal sarcophagi and five heart urns range in style from puritan plain to exuberant rococo. Some of the dozen resident Capuchin friars continue their customary role as the guardians and caretakers of the crypt, along with their other pastoral work in Vienna. (Note: Subscript numbers behind the names of most persons listed in this article are used to avoid confusion in cross-references due to the similarity or duplication of names over the many generations. A unique small index number appears with the name of every person buried in the Imperial Crypt. The number corresponds with that person's entry in the detailed listing of occupants of each Vault, to which it is hyperlinked. When necessary to establish continuity, a person buried elsewhere is assigned a number preceded by an "x" and then listed in the Selected other Habsburgs section.) The most recent entombment was in 2023.

== History ==
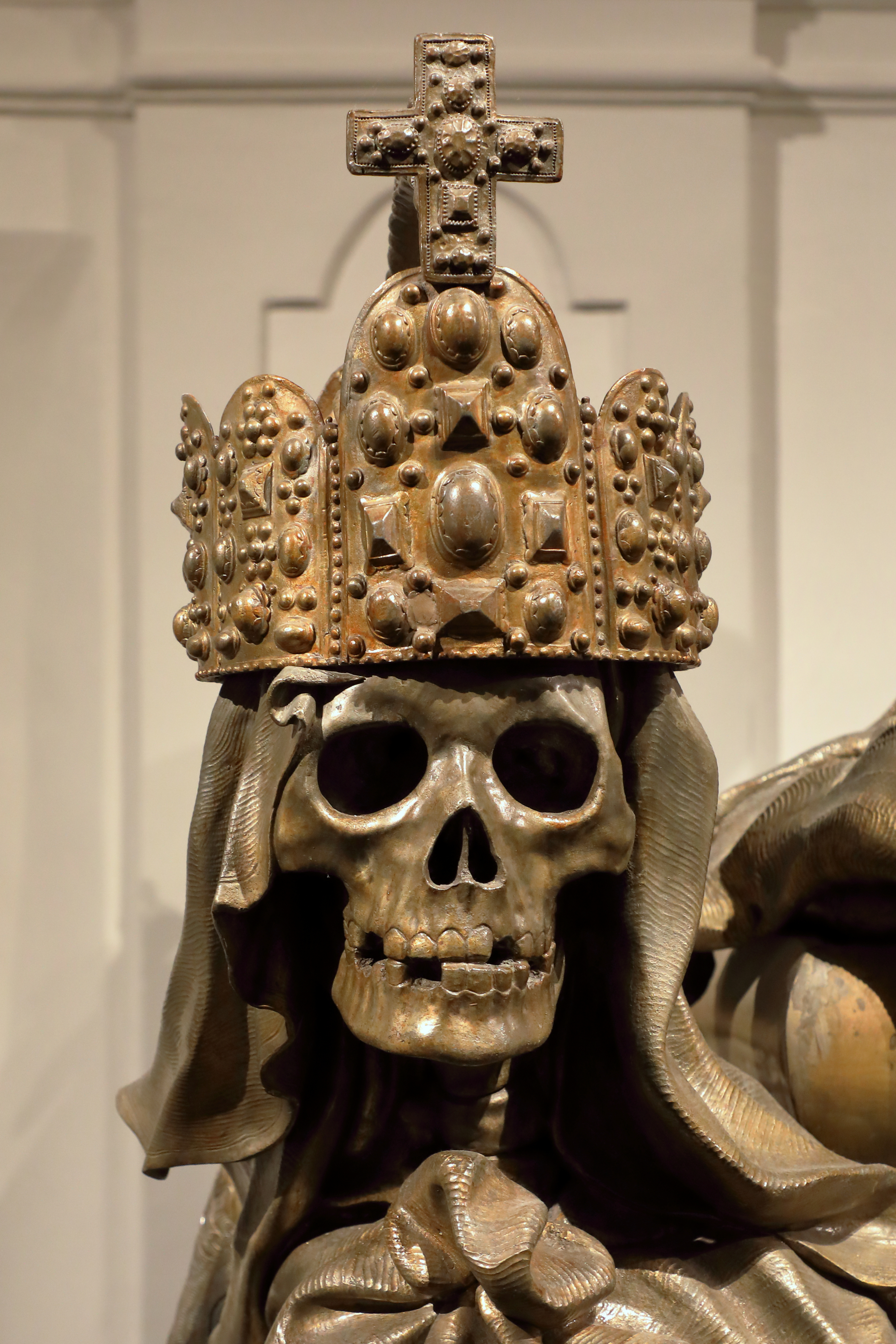
An ornament of the sarcophagus of Emperor Charles VI: a death's head with the Imperial Crown

Anna of Tyrol_{1}, wife of Emperor Matthias_{2} conceived the idea of a Capuchin cloister and burial crypt for herself and her husband, to be built in the neighborhood of the Hofburg castle in Vienna. She provided funds for it in the will she made on 10 November 1617 and died the following year in 1618 which released the funds, allowing for planning and construction to commence. Her spouse died in 1619.

The foundation stone was laid on 8 September 1622 in the presence of Emperor Ferdinand II_{x578} and after slow progress caused by the distractions of the Thirty Years' War the church was dedicated on 25 July 1632. At Easter the following year, the simple sarcophagi containing the remains of Emperor Matthias_{2} and Empress Anna_{1} were transferred with great ceremony to what is now called the Founders Vault.

Emperor Leopold I_{37} enlarged the crypt in 1657 in the area under the nave of the church and his son Emperor Joseph I_{35} extended it further westward and built another mausoleum chamber and a chapel to the east in 1710, but awkwardly, beginning the vault that his brother Emperor Charles VI_{40} continued westward in 1720 that extends under the chancel and the apse choir above. For the first time, a well-known architect (Lukas von Hildebrandt) was involved with an enlargement of the crypt.

In 1754, his daughter Empress Maria Theresa_{56} went even further west, completely past the church above, into the monastery garden with her domed addition that admits natural light. The imposing dome and crypt is the work of architect Jean Jadot de Ville-Issey. During the reign of her grandson Emperor Francis II_{57} architect Johann Aman turned to the north for his addition in 1824.

The monastery surrounding the church had fallen into disrepair after 200 years of constant use, so during the reign of Emperor Ferdinand_{62} in 1840 the monastery (but not the church) was torn down and rebuilt. As part of that project, architect Johann Höhne built the Ferdinand Vault and the Tuscan Vault as part of the basement of the new structure.

As part of the jubilee celebrating his 60 years on the throne in 1908, Emperor Franz Joseph I_{142} had architect Cajo Perisic build another mausoleum chamber and a chapel to the east of Franz II_{57} and Ferdinand's_{62} vaults. At the same time, new annexes for visitors were created on either side of the church.

By 1960 it was obvious from the deteriorating condition of the tombs that the environment of changing heat and humidity needed to be controlled if the historic sarcophagi were to survive for future generations. The New Vault, north of the Tuscan, Ferdinand's and the Franz Joseph Vault, was built by architect Karl Schwanzer, with metal doors by sculptor Rudolf Hoflehner. It added about 20% to the space of the crypt, and was used as part of a massive rearrangement of the tombs in the vaults.

The original small vault had held, besides the tombs of the two founders, those of a dozen children and had been called the Angel's Vault. Those were moved to open niches newly made in the front wall of the Leopold Vault. Selected tombs from various other vaults were moved to the New Vault and grouped in themes such as Bishops, the direct ancestors of the last reigning emperor, and the immediate family of Archduke Charles, Duke of Teschen,_{122} the victor of Aspern.

Thirty seven other tombs, of some minors and minor members of the ruling family, were walled-up into four piers created in the Ferdinand Vault. Thus about half of all the tombs were moved out of the original vaults to more orderly places as part of that great reorganization.

In 2003 another project made the crypt accessible to disabled visitors, and opened previously unused doors so that the visitor route no longer requires the 100% backtracking that was necessary before. The entire crypt was also air conditioned to prevent deterioration of the tombs.

== Funeral Entrance Ritual ==
The Chapel has a long cherished burial ceremony that goes back at least 200 years. After a royal member has died, the body is taken to the Chapel. A funeral official knocks on the chapel doors. The chapel friars ask who is there from the opposite side of the closed door. The official says that it is the body of Emperor/Empress, or Prince/Princess so and so. The friar replies that he knows of no such person. This dialogue continues two or three times with further knocking. Finally the funeral official says that the person who died is a 'poor sinner'. When hearing this, the chapel friars open the doors and allows the coffin to be taken inside.

== The sarcophagi ==
The free-standing tombs are usually variations of either a flat-topped storage chest, or a tub with sloping sides and a convex lid of tapered decks. Ornamentation ranges from simple to elaborate. Until far in the 18th century, the most common material for a sarcophagus here was a bronze-like alloy of tin, coated with shellac. The splendid tombs of the baroque and rococo eras are made of true bronze, a nobler and therefore more expensive material. Reforming Emperor Joseph II_{42} decreed simplified burial customs for the people, and introduced the use of lighter and cheaper copper into the Imperial Crypt, where it was then used into the 19th century. In the later 19th century a mixture of cast brass and bronze as well as silver-bronzed copper was adopted. Other metals were used only rarely, except for silver and gold plating on decorations.

Various techniques of metalworking were used: full casting for the sarcophagus; hollow casting for decorative sculpture; carving, engraving, and hammered relief for surface decoration. The parts for chests and covers are riveted together, ornaments and decorative figures are screwed on. The sculptor responsible for the most elaborate tombs is Balthasar Ferdinand Moll.

In order to guarantee the stability of the enormous display tombs, they have iron bracings and wood lining inside. This avoids both cave-ins and a buckling of the side walls from the weight of the cover. The cover of the double tomb of Empress Maria Theresa_{56} and her husband_{55} alone weighs approximately 1700 kg (3800 lb).

Within the outer case lies a wooden coffin that is wrapped in silk (black with gold trim for rulers, red with silver trim for others). The coffin usually has two locks, the key to one is kept by the Capuchin Guardian of the crypt, the other is kept in the Schatzkammer of the Hofburg palace in Vienna.

Within the coffin, the body usually has had the organs removed as a necessary part of the embalming process for its display before the funeral. For about one-third of the bodies, the heart has been placed into a silver urn and sent elsewhere (usually the Herzgruft in the Augustinerkirche), and for some the intestines and other organs have been put into a copper urn and deposited in the Dukes Crypt in the catacombs of Vienna's cathedral, the Stephansdom.

=== Conservation of the tombs ===
Over the centuries, constant humidity, variations in temperature, and the host of visitors had taken a great toll on the sarcophagi. Corrosion craters, holes and tears had developed. Layers of the horizontal surfaces had peeled, base plates had broken through, decorative fixtures had been broken or stolen by visitors, the cast metal absorbed too much humidity and puffed up, and heavy covers had caused some sidewalls to bend or cave.

The first major restoration effort was undertaken in 1852, but further work was needed by 1956 when the Gesellschaft zur Rettung der Kapuzinergruft (Association for Saving the Capuchin Crypt) came into being to inform the public of the problem, raise funds, and preserve and restore the tombs.

It was first necessary to create additional space and to dehumidify the crypt. After completion of the New Vault in 1960 and the transfer of 26 tombs from the overflowing Tuscan Vault, the work of dehumidification could begin. Also, a workshop was created in the south end of the Tuscan Vault where highly skilled artisans could work on selected tombs temporarily moved there for restoration.

In 2003 remodelling of the ground-level visitor facilities took place to create a new visitor entrance and make the crypt accessible to disabled visitors. The visitor route was also changed so that visitors now see the tombs in historical sequence by entering at one end and leaving at the other, instead of both entering and leaving via a single stairway that is in the middle of the route. Most importantly, the entire crypt was air conditioned so that humidity can be controlled.

The repair and conservation of the artistic work takes place in close cooperation with the friars, the Association, the Austrian Monument Office and the Vienna Old City Preservation Fund.

== People buried here ==
The bodies of 145 people (mainly members of the ruling line of the House of Habsburg and the successor House of Habsburg-Lorraine), plus urns containing the hearts or cremated remains of four others, are deposited in one of the ten interconnected Vaults of the Imperial Crypt. They include 12 Emperors and 18 Empresses. The most recent entombment, that of Archduchess Yolande of Austria, wife of Archduke Carl Ludwig, was on 7 October 2023.

From other families there are 33 spouses, plus four others, who have found their resting place here.

The longest-lived person entombed here is Yolande De Ligne, aged 100 years and 5 months. The next longest-lived is Otto von Habsburg_{150}, eldest son of the last Austrian emperor, at 98 years. Several died at birth and over 25% of those entombed here were five years of age or younger when they died.

Emperors buried here:

1. Emperor Matthias
2. Emperor Ferdinand III
3. Emperor Leopold I
4. Emperor Joseph I
5. Emperor Charles VI
6. Emperor Francis I Stephen, husband of Maria Theresa
7. Emperor Joseph II
8. Emperor Leopold II
9. Emperor Francis II
10. Emperor Ferdinand I of Austria
11. Emperor Maximilian I of Mexico,
12. Emperor Franz Joseph I of Austria

Empresses buried here:

1. Anna, consort of Emperor Mathias
2. Maria Anna, consort of Emperor Ferdinand III
3. Eleonora Magdalena, consort of Emperor Ferdinand III
4. Maria Leopoldine, consort of Emperor Ferdinand III
5. Margaret Theresa, consort of Emperor Leopold I
6. Eleonora Magdalena, consort of Emperor Leopold I
7. Elisabeth Christina, consort of Emperor Charles VI
8. Empress Maria Theresa
9. Maria Josepha, consort of Emperor Joseph II
10. Isabella Maria, consort of Emperor Joseph II
11. Elisabeth Wilhelmine, consort of Emperor Francis II
12. Maria Theresa consort of Emperor Francis II
13. Maria Ludovika, consort of Emperor Francis II
14. Karoline Augusta, consort of Emperor Francis II
15. Archduchess Marie Louise, Empress Consort of the French
16. Maria Anna, consort of Emperor Ferdinand I of Austria
17. Elisabeth, consort of Emperor Francis Joseph of Austria
18. Zita, consort of Emperor Charles of Austria

(Also, the hearts of Empresses Claudia Felicitas and Amalie Wilhemine are here, but their bodies are buried elsewhere.)

All 146 persons buried here (in whole or in part) are shown on the directory charts below, together with links to a detailed text listing. For ease of use, they show the Habsburg family buried here as family trees based upon lines of descent.

- Go directly to family of the Founders (c. 1450 – c. 1650)
- Go directly to descendants of Emperor Ferdinand III (c. 1600 – c. 1750)
- Go directly to descendants of Empress Maria Theresa (c. 1725 – c. 1875)
- Go directly to descendants of Emperor Leopold II (c. 1750 – c. 1900)
- Go directly to descendants of Emperor Francis II (c. 1775 – end of the monarchy)
- Go directly to descendants of the Grand Dukes of Tuscany (c. 1775 – c. 1900).

== Vaults ==
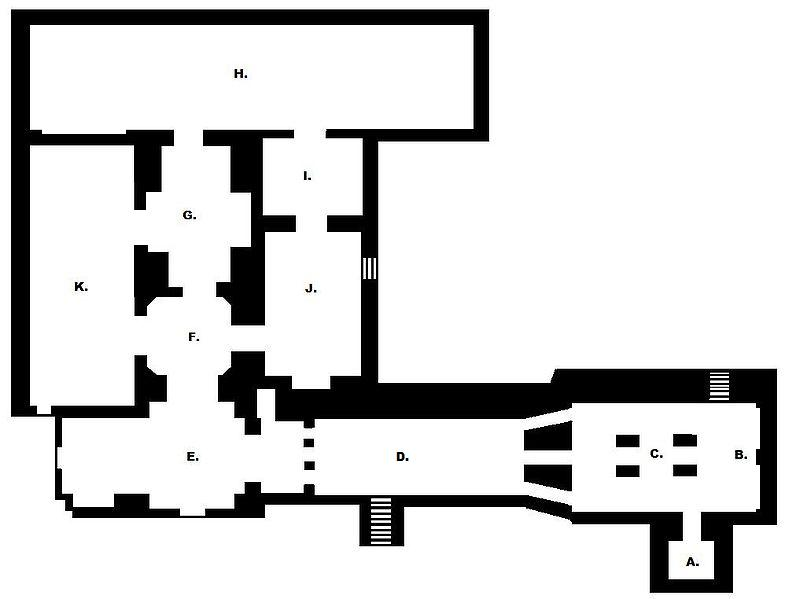
Plan of the Imperial Crypt A. Founders Vault B. Children's Columbarium C. Leopold Vault D. Charles Vault E. Maria Theresa Vault F. Franz Vault G. Ferdinand Vault H. New Vault I. Franz Joseph Vault J. Crypt Chapel K. Tuscan Vault

The vaults consist of an interconnected series of ten subterranean vaulted rooms, built at various times as more space was needed.

The visible 107 metal sarcophagi and five heart urns range in style from puritan plain to exuberant rococo.

The bodies of 145 nobles, plus urns containing the hearts or cremated remains of four others, are deposited here. There is only one space left. They include 12 Emperors and 18 Empresses. The most recent entombment_{149} was in 2023.

From other families there are 33 spouses, plus four others,_{15} _{41} _{47} _{117} who have been entombed here. Everyone else in the Imperial Crypt was born with the Habsburgs-only title of Archduke or Archduchess.

In 1960, with the various vaults overcrowded, a major rearrangement project began which resulted in the construction of the Children's Columbarium and the New Vault. At the same time many bodies were moved to those new areas, others were moved from the Tuscan Vault and the Ferdinand Vault and walled up into the corner piers of the Ferdinand Vault.

=== Founders Vault ===
The Gründergruft is the oldest part of the Kaisergruft, dating from the original construction of the church (completed in 1632), and lies under the Emperor Chapel at the left of the nave of the church above. The room is low, plain, and windowless, and visible through baroque gates from the Leopold Vault. Here stand the two plain sarcophagi of the founding couple.

Looking through the gate, from left to right:

- 2 Emperor Matthias (1557–1619) →Family Tree
  Third son of Emperor Maximilian II._{x527} Once governor of the Austrian Netherlands, he wrested power over Austria, Hungary and Moravia from his inept brother Emperor Rudolf II_{x552} in 1608 and inherited the rest in 1612. He built the original hunting lodge that became Schönbrunn, and died only three months after his wife Empress Anna._{1} His heart is buried in urn 2 in the Herzgruft in the Augustinerkirche. His intestines are buried in urn 18 in the Ducal Crypt of the Stephansdom.
- 1 Empress Anna of Tyrol (4 October 1585 – 15 December 1618) →Family Tree
  Daughter of Ferdinand II, Duke of Tyrol and wife of her cousin Emperor Matthias_{2} who was 28 years older than she was. She provided in her will of 1617 for the establishment of a crypt for her and her husband in a Capuchin's Church to be built in Vienna, and died only one year later, at age 33 after seven years of a childless marriage. Her heart is buried in urn 1 in the Herzgruft in the Augustinerkirche. Her intestines are buried in urn 17 in the Ducal Crypt of the Stephansdom.

=== Leopold Vault ===
The Leopoldsgruft was built under the nave of the church above, beginning in 1657 by Emperor Leopold I of Austria,_{37} following the edict of his father Emperor Ferdinand III_{27} that the hereditary burial place of the imperial family would be in this church. Considering that Leopold contributed his three wives and 16 of his children—plus himself—to the population of the crypt, it was inevitable that other vaults would be needed soon.

==== Children's Columbarium ====
Turning to the left of the gates to the Founders Vault, in the thick east foundation wall of the church are twelve longitudinal recessed niches built in the 1960s containing sarcophagi of 12 children. The coffins had previously been in either the Founders Vault or the main hall of this vault, but were generally in poor condition and have now been placed into identical cases. No markings or documentation identifies which child lies in which coffin, but those buried in these niches are:

Four children of Emperor Ferdinand III_{27}:

- 3 Archduke Maximilian Thomas (1638–1639) →Family Tree
  Infant son of Emperor Ferdinand III_{27} and Empress Maria Anna._{22}
- 4 Archduke Philipp August (1637–1639) →Family Tree
  Two-year-old son of Emperor Ferdinand III_{27} and Empress Maria Anna._{22}
- 5 Archduchess Theresia Maria (1652–1653) →Family Tree
  Infant daughter of Emperor Ferdinand III_{27} and Empress Eleonora._{19}
- 6 Archduke Ferdinand Josef (1657–1658) →Family Tree
  Infant son of Emperor Ferdinand III_{27} and Empress Eleonora._{19} His viscera are buried in urn 22 in the Ducal Crypt of the Stephansdom.

Seven children of Emperor Leopold I_{37}:

- 7 Archduke Ferdinand Wenzel (1667–1668) →Family Tree
  Infant son of Emperor Leopold I_{37} and Empress Margarita Teresa._{20} His intestines are buried in urn 25 in the Ducal Crypt of the Stephansdom.
- 8 Archduke Johann Leopold (1670) →Family Tree
  Infant son of Emperor Leopold I_{37} and Empress Margarita Teresa._{20} His intestines are buried in urn 27 in the Ducal Crypt of the Stephansdom.
- 10 Archduchess Maria Anna (1672) →Family Tree
  Infant daughter of Emperor Leopold I_{37} and Empress Margarita Teresa._{20} Her intestines are buried in urn 28 in the Ducal Crypt of the Stephansdom.
- 11 Archduchess Anna Maria Sophia (1674) →Family Tree
  Infant daughter of Emperor Leopold I_{37} and Empress Claudia Felicitas._{24} Her viscera are buried in urn 30 in the Ducal Crypt of the Stephansdom.
- 12 Archduchess Maria Josepha (1675–1676) →Family Tree
  Infant daughter of Emperor Leopold I_{37} and Empress Claudia Felicitas._{24} Her heart is in a gold and silver urn atop her mother's sarcophagus in the Dominican Church. Her viscera are buried in urn 32 in the Ducal Crypt of the Stephansdom.
- 13 Archduchess Christina (1679) →Family Tree
  Infant daughter of Emperor Leopold I_{37} and Empress Eleonora Magdelena._{32}
- 14 Archduchess Maria Margareta (1690–1691) →Family Tree
  Infant daughter of Emperor Leopold I_{37} and Empress Eleonora Magdelena._{32} Her heart is buried in urn 34, and her viscera in urn 35, in the Ducal Crypt of the Stephansdom.

Grandson of Emperor Ferdinand III_{27}:

- 15 Unnamed (1686) →Family Tree
  Son of Johann Wilhelm of Pfalz-Neuberg and Archduchess Maria Anna Josepha._{17}

==== Main Hall ====
In front of the Children's Columbarium:

- 9 (Urn containing the heart of) Queen Maria Anna of Portugal (9 July 1683 – 14 August 1754) →Family Tree
  Daughter of Emperor Leopold I._{37} Her body is in the Monastery of São Vicente de Fora in Lisbon, beside her husband John V of Portugal.

Proceeding along the north wall, east-to-west:

- 16 Archduchess Maria Josepha (1687–1703) →Family Tree
  Sixteen-year-old daughter of Emperor Leopold I._{37} Her heart is buried in urn 10 the Herzgruft in the Augustinerkirche, and her viscera are buried in urn 40 in the Ducal Crypt of the Stephansdom.
- 17 Archduchess Maria Anna Josepha (20 December 1654 – 4 April 1689) →Family Tree
  Daughter of Emperor Ferdinand III._{27} Wife of Johann Wilhelm, Elector Palatine.
- 18 Queen Eleonora Maria of Poland (21 May 1653 – 17 December 1697) →Family Tree
  Daughter of Emperor Ferdinand III._{27} Wife of Michael Korybut Wiśniowiecki, King of Poland, then of Charles IV, Duke of Lorraine, by whom she became grandmother of the two brothers who married Empress Maria Theresa_{56} and her sister._{39}
- 19 Empress Eleonora Magdalena (18 November 1630 – 6 December 1686) →Family Tree
  Third wife of Emperor Ferdinand III._{27} Foundress of the Order of the Starry Cross (the Sternkreuzorden). Her heart is buried in urn 7 in the Herzgruft in the Augustinerkirche and her viscera are buried in urn 33 in the Ducal Crypt of the Stephansdom.
- 20 Empress Margarita Teresa (12 August 1651 – 12 March 1673) →Family Tree
  Niece and first wife of Emperor Leopold I_{37} at age 15. She is the blonde princess depicted in the Spanish painter Diego Velázquez' masterpiece Las Meninas ("The Maids of Honor", 1656), where she is surrounded by her ladies-in-waiting and other persons of the Spanish court. Her 21-year-old heart is buried in urn 6 the Herzgruft in the Augustinerkirche and her viscera are buried in urn 29 in the Ducal Crypt of the Stephansdom.
- 21 Empress Maria Leopoldina (6 April 1632 – 7 August 1649) →Family Tree
  Second wife of Emperor Ferdinand III._{27} Married at age 16, died in childbirth of Archduke Karl Joseph_{116} the next year.
- 22 Empress Maria Anna (18 August 1606 – 13 May 1646) →Family Tree
  Born Infanta of Spain, first wife of Emperor Ferdinand III._{27}
- 23 Archduchess Maria Amalia (5 April 1724 – 19 April 1730) →Family Tree
  Six-year-old youngest daughter of Emperor Charles VI._{40} Her viscera are buried in urn 45 in the Ducal Crypt of the Stephansdom.
- 24 (Urn containing the heart of) Empress Claudia Felicitas (30 May 1653 – 8 April 1676) →Family Tree
  Second wife of Emperor Leopold I._{37} Her body, by her own request, is dressed in the habit of a Dominican nun and is entombed beside her mother in the Dominican Church. Her viscera are buried in urn 31 in the Ducal Crypt of the Stephansdom.

Proceeding along the south wall, east-to-west:

- 25 Archduchess Maria Theresia (1684–1696) →Family Tree
  Twelve-year-old daughter of Emperor Leopold I._{37} Her heart is buried in urn 9 in the Herzgruft in the Augustinerkirche and her viscera are buried in urn 37 in the Ducal Crypt of the Stephansdom.
- 26 Archduke Leopold Joseph (1682–1684) →Family Tree
  Son of Emperor Leopold I._{37} His sarcophagus is normal sized although he was only two years old when he died.
- 27 Emperor Ferdinand III (13 July 1608 – 2 April 1657) →Family Tree
  Third son of Emperor Ferdinand II._{x578} →Family Tree Nine of his children are buried here. His viscera are buried in urn 21 in the Ducal Crypt of the Stephansdom.
- 28 Archduchess Maria Antonia (18 January 1669 – 24 December 1692) →Family Tree
  Daughter of Emperor Leopold I_{37} and wife of Maximilian II Emanuel, Elector of Bavaria. Her heart is buried in urn 8 in the Herzgruft in the Augustinerkirche and her viscera are buried in urn 36 in the Ducal Crypt of the Stephansdom.
- 29 King Ferdinand IV of the Romans (8 September 1633 – 9 July 1654) →Family Tree
  Eldest son of Emperor Ferdinand III._{27} His heart is buried in urn 4 in the Herzgruft in the Augustinerkirche and his viscera are buried in urn 20 in the Ducal Crypt of the Stephansdom. He established the tradition of burial of different parts in three separate Vienna churches.
- 30 Archduke Leopold Johann (13 April 1716 – 4 November 1716) →Family Tree
  Six-month-old only son of Emperor Charles VI._{40} His death later led to the War of the Austrian Succession because his father had no other male heirs. His heart is buried in urn 43, and his viscera in urn 44, in the Ducal Crypt of the Stephansdom.
- 31 Archduchess Maria Magdalena (26 March 1689 – 1 May 1743) →Family Tree
  Daughter of Emperor Leopold I._{37}
- 32 Empress Eleonora Magdalena of Pfalz-Neuburg (6 January 1655 – 19 January 1720) →Family Tree
  Third wife of Emperor Leopold I._{37}

=== Charles Vault ===
The first part of the Charles Vault (Karlsgruft) was built in 1710 by Emperor Joseph I._{35} In 1720 it was extended by Johann Lukas von Hildebrandt on the orders of Emperor Charles VI_{40} and shelters 8 containers:

Proceeding along the south wall, from left to right:

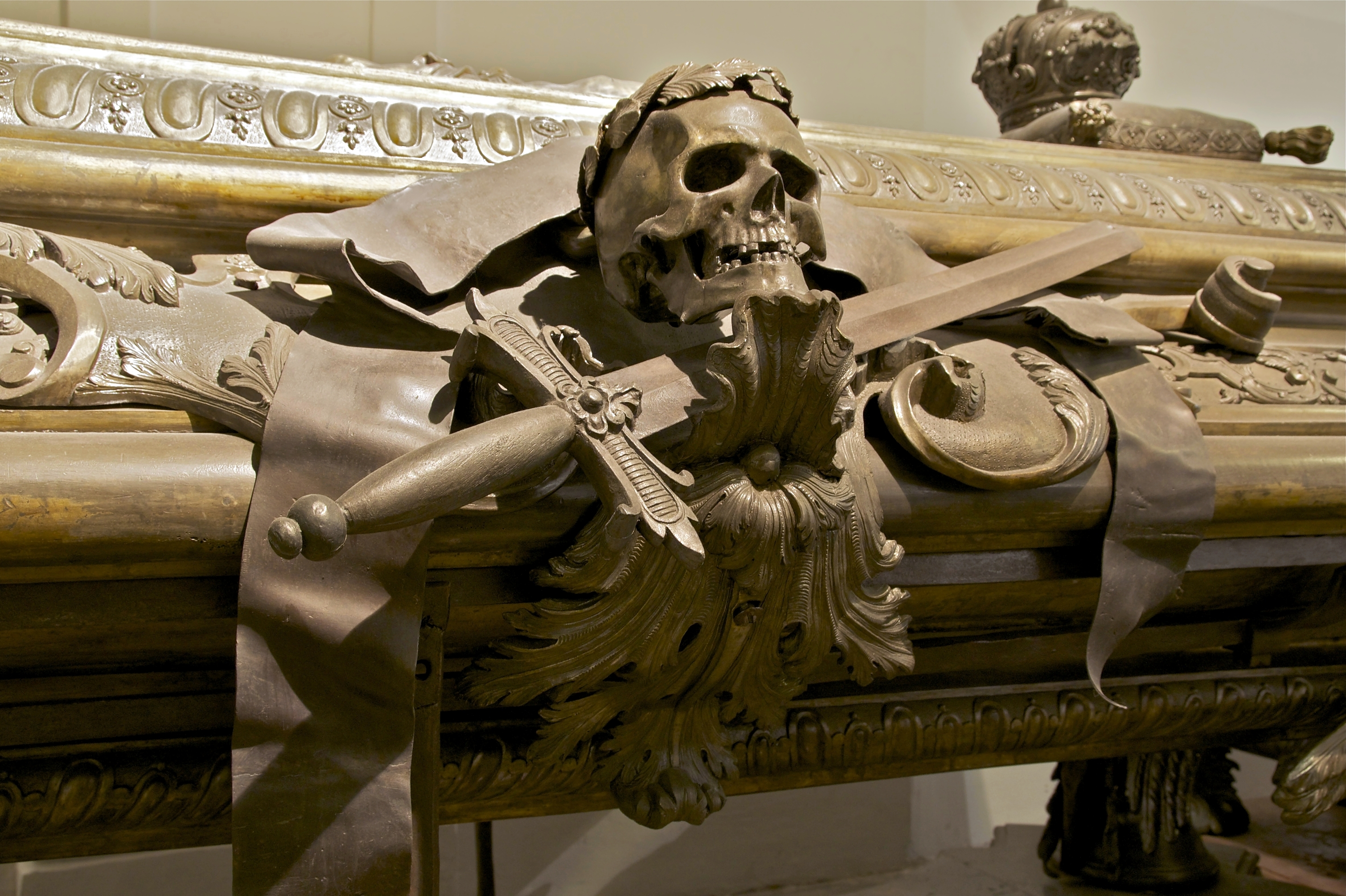
Sarcophagus of Emperor Leopold I

- 37 Emperor Leopold I (9 June 1640 – 5 May 1705) →Family Tree
  Second son of Emperor Ferdinand III_{27} and father of Emperors Joseph I_{35} and Charles VI._{40} He repelled an effort by the Muslims to conquer Europe at the Second Siege of Vienna. He built the Leopold's Wing of the Hofburg, used today as the offices of the president of Austria. He can be seen sculpted, kneeling prayer for the end of the plague epidemic, on the plague column (Pestsäule) in Vienna. Died at age 65 after a reign of 48 years. His three wives and 16 of his children are buried here. His heart is buried in urn 11 the Herzgruft in the Augustinerkirche and his viscera are in urn 41 in the Ducal Crypt of the Stephansdom.
- 38 Archduchess Maria Elisabeth (1680–1741) →Family Tree
  Daughter of Emperor Leopold I._{37} Unmarried, she was appointed governor of the Austrian Netherlands in her own right and when she died at age 69, was originally buried in Brussels but was transferred here 8 years later. Her heart is buried in urn 14 in the Herzgruft in the Augustinerkirche and her viscera are in urn 51 in the Ducal Crypt of the Stephansdom.
- 39 Archduchess Maria Anna (14 September 1718 – 16 December 1744) →Family Tree
  Daughter of Emperor Charles VI._{40} and sister of Empress Maria Theresia._{56} She married Charles of Lorraine, brother of Maria Theresia's husband, Emperor Franz I Stephen._{55} They were joint governors of the Austrian Netherlands. She died in Brussels at age 24 whence her body was transferred at her sister's order. Her heart is buried in urn 15 in the Herzgruft in the Augustinerkirche and her viscera are in urn 52 in the Ducal Crypt of the Stephansdom.

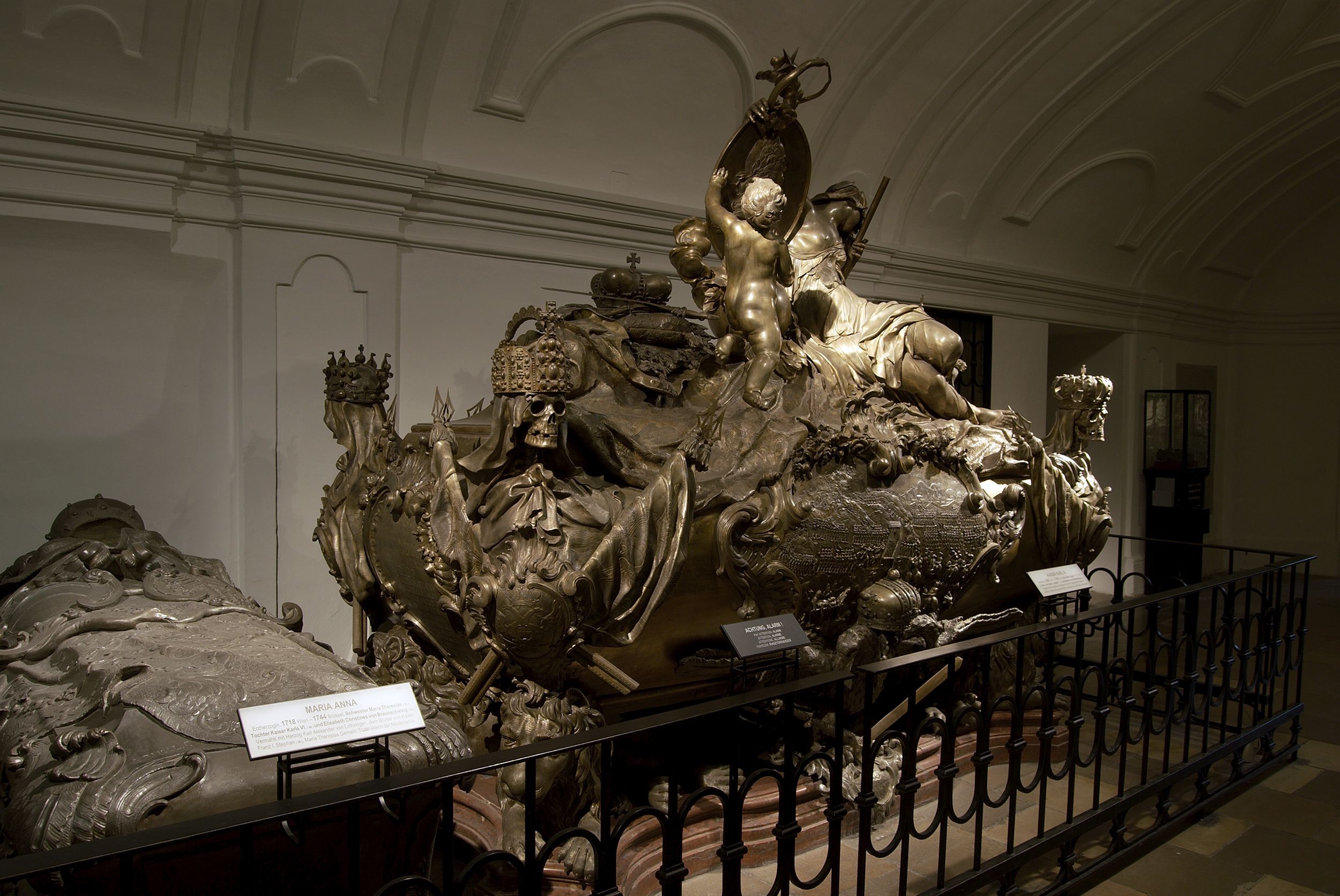
Sarcophagus of Emperor Charles VI

- 40 Emperor Charles VI (1 October 1685 – 20 October 1740) →Family Tree
  Younger son of Emperor Leopold I._{37} Raised in Spain in preparation to inherit the Spanish throne upon the death of his childless cousin, the War of the Spanish Succession ended when Charles unexpectedly inherited the Empire upon his brother Joseph's_{35} early death and no one wanted to allow the dominance that would come from empowering Charles with both realms. Moving to Vienna, he brought the Spanish Riding School with him and built the magnificent hall it uses today. Because he had no surviving male heirs,_{30} he negotiated the Pragmatic Sanction to assure that his daughter Maria Theresa_{56} would succeed him, going so far as to pre-bribe the nine Electors but, of course, once he died they ignored their promises but kept the money, resulting in the War of the Austrian Succession. He died after a reign of 29 years, at age 55 after catching a cold while hunting. His heart is buried in urn 13 the Herzgruft in the Augustinerkirche and his viscera are in urn 48 in the Ducal Crypt of the Stephansdom.

His tomb has a death's head at each corner wearing one of the distinctive crowns of his major realms (the Empire, Bohemia, Hungary, and Austria).

The empty plaza at the west third of this vault was used as the area for reception ceremonies when new bodies were brought in after the funeral ceremonies upstairs.

Returning along the north wall, from left to right:

- 36 Empress Elisabeth Christine of Brunswick-Wolfenbüttel (28 August 1691 – 21 December 1750) →Family Tree
  Wife (1708) of Emperor Charles VI_{40} and mother of Empress Maria Theresa._{56} Died at age 59 of heart failure brought on by corpulence and rheumatism. Her sarcophagus is the earliest by Balthasar Ferdinand Moll. Her heart is buried in urn 17 the Herzgruft in the Augustinerkirche and her viscera are buried in urn 53 in the Ducal Crypt of the Stephansdom.

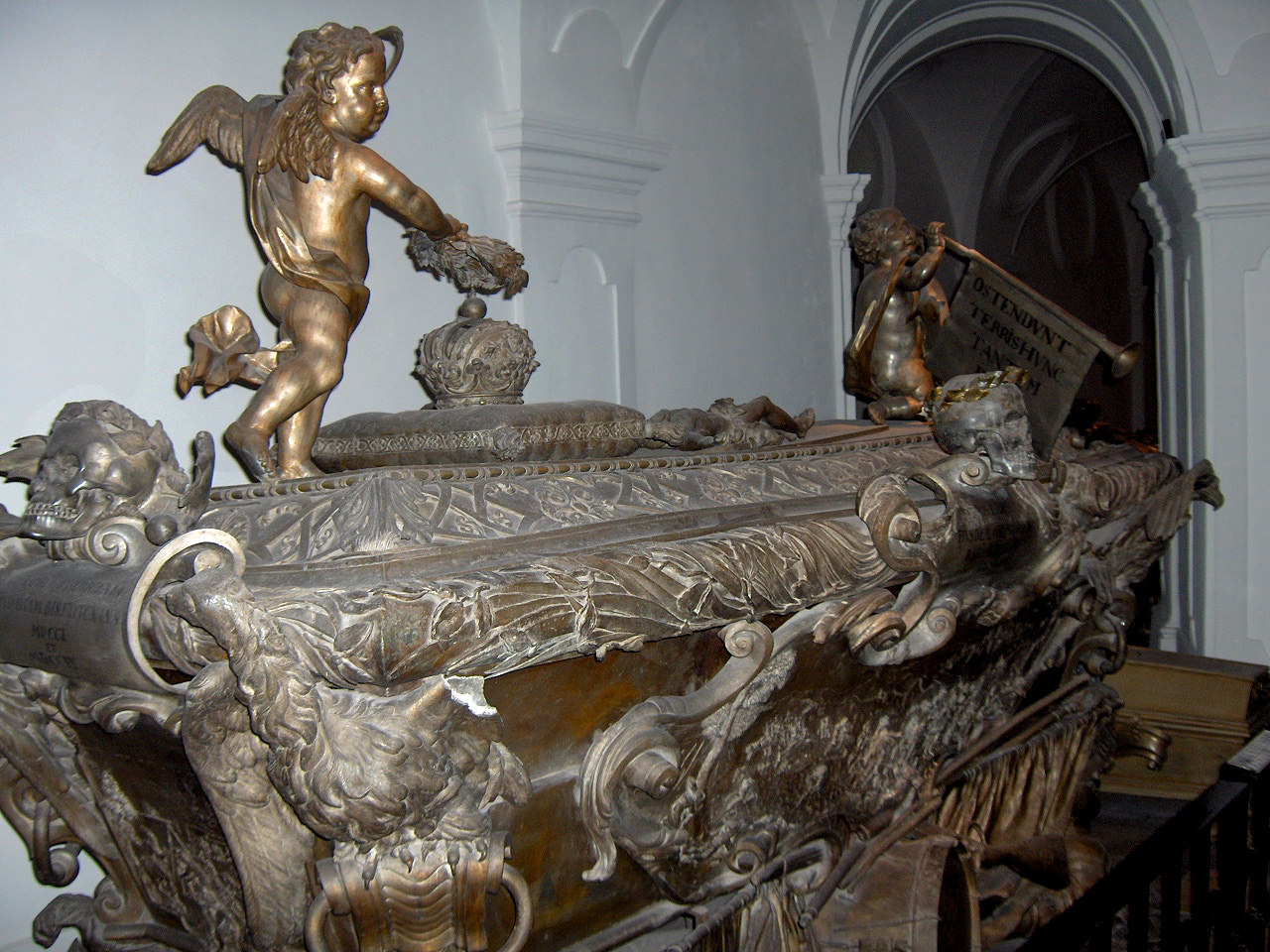
Tomb of Emperor Joseph I

- 35 Emperor Joseph I (1678–1711) →Family Tree
  Son of Emperor Leopold I._{37} Allied with the British during the War of the Spanish Succession where his great general Eugene of Savoy worked with the Duke of Marlborough to prevent the throne of Spain going to the French. With no surviving son,_{33} he died of the black pox at age 33 after a reign of 6 years. The heart of his wife_{34} is nearby. His heart is buried in urn 12 the Herzgruft in the Augustinerkirche and his viscera are buried separately in urn 42 in the Ducal Crypt of the Stephansdom.
- 34 (Urn containing the heart of ) Empress Wilhelmina Amalia of Brunswick (21 April 1673 – 10 April 1742) →Family Tree
  Wife (1699) of Emperor Joseph I._{35} The wing of the Hofburg in which she had living space during her widowhood is named after her, but she founded the Salesian Cloister in Vienna 1712 to educate young women and spent much of her time there. She died of edema at age 69. Her body lies dressed in a nun's habit entombed in a simple stone sarcophagus below the high altar in the Salesian Cloister in Vienna.
- 33 Archduke Leopold Joseph (1700–1701) →Family Tree
  Infant son of Emperor Joseph I._{35} Died of hydrocephalus. His viscera are buried in urn 38 in the Ducal Crypt of the Stephansdom.

=== Maria Theresa Vault ===
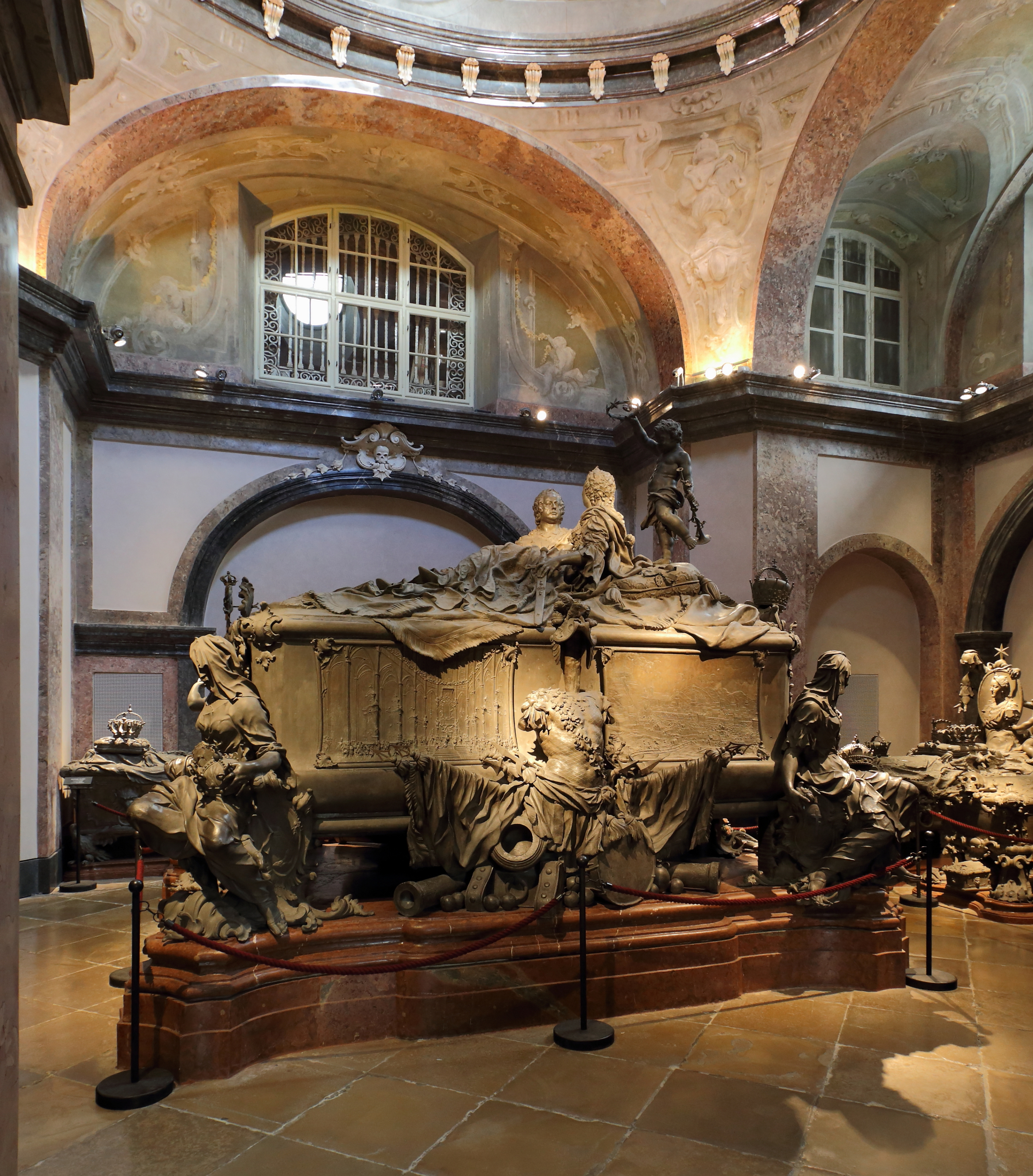
Maria Theresa Vault with the Tomb of Empress Maria Theresa of Austria

The three vaults of the Imperial Crypt held 44 bodies plus urns containing the hearts of two other persons when Empress Maria Theresa_{56} started construction of the Maria Theresien Gruft in 1754. It is behind the church above, with its dome rising into the monastery courtyard and contains the tombs of 16 persons:

In the entrance archway:

- 42 Emperor Joseph II (Schönbrunn 13 March 1741 – Vienna 20 February 1790 →Family Tree
  Son of Empress Maria Theresa._{56} A populist who became known as "the people's emperor", he initiated many reforms (including a prohibition on embalming and elaborate burials), many of which he repudiated in disillusionment shortly before his death. In keeping with his edict, his body is unembalmed and intact within a simple copper tomb. He died shortly before his 49th birthday after an official reign of 10 years. His equestrian statue in the Josefsplatz of the Hofburg palace is where Harry Lime's auto accident occurs in The Third Man. His two wives and two children are buried in this vault.

In the small chamber immediately north of Emperor Joseph II_{42}:

- 41 Countess Karoline von Fuchs-Mollard (1 January 1681 – 27 April 1754) →Family Tree
  Long-time family retainer and governess to Empress Maria Theresia,_{56} her sisters_{23} _{39} and her children. The inscription of gratitude on the lid of her sarcophagus is signed by Empress Maria Theresa,_{56} who ordered her burial with the imperial family (although she had no direct blood or matrimonial connection to the Habsburgs) when she died at age 73.

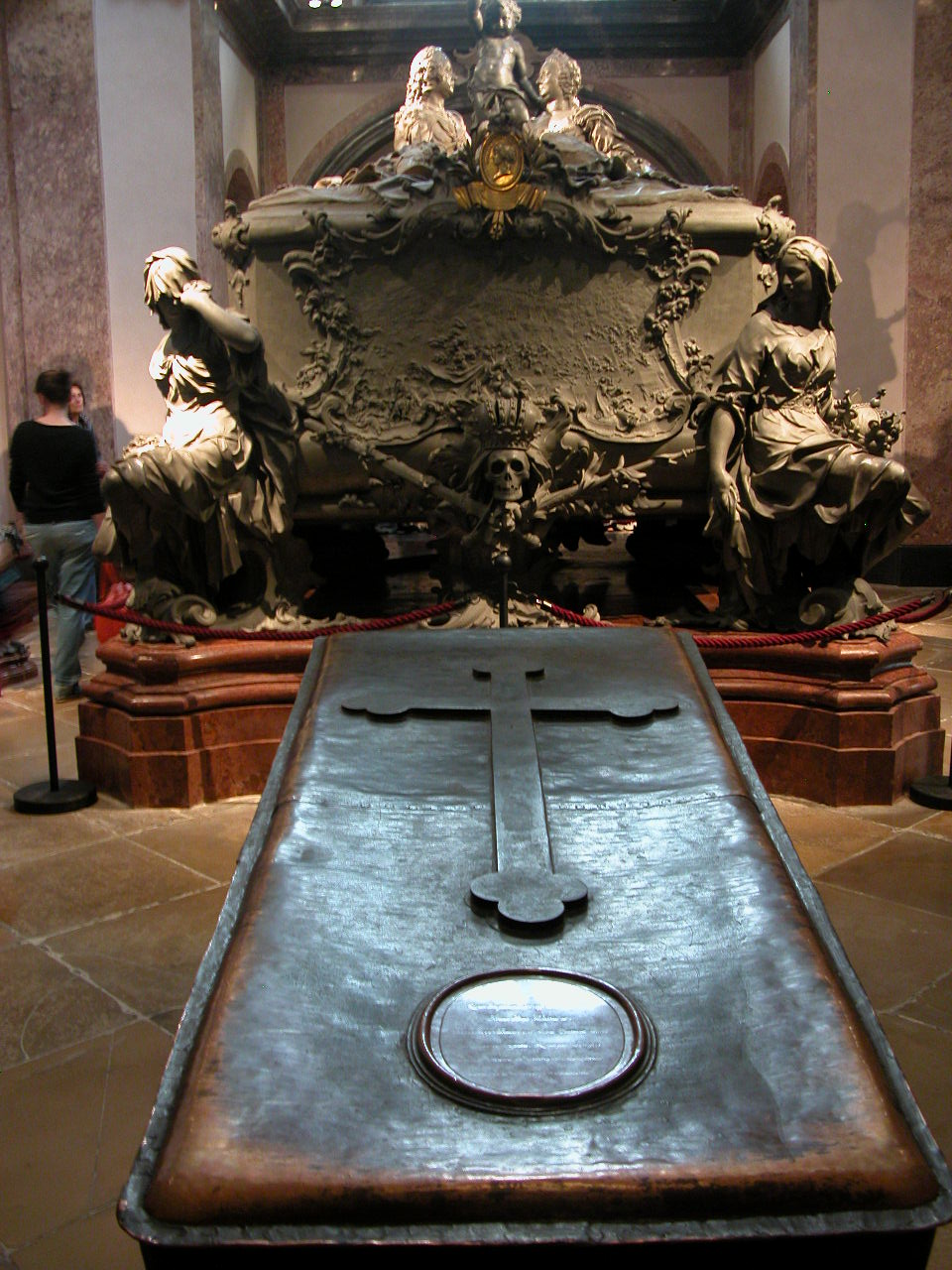
Tomb of Empress Maria Theresa of Austria with the Tomb of Emperor Joseph II in the foreground

In the center of the vault, from left to right:

- 56 Empress Maria Theresa (13 May 1717 – 29 November 1780) →Family Tree
  Eldest surviving descendant of Emperor Charles VI,_{40}→Family Tree her ascension was contested and officially the crown of the Empire went to her husband (1736) Emperor Franz I Stephen._{55} Dying at age 63, her forty years' reign is thought of by the Austrians as the British think of Queen Victoria: the golden years of power, prestige and empire. A prominent statue of her enthroned and surrounded by her ministers is a landmark at the entrance to the Museumsplatz. Her heart is buried in the Herzgruft in the Augustinerkirche.
- 55 Emperor Franz I Stephen (Lunéville 8 December 1708 – Innsbruck 18 August 1765) →Family Tree
  Duke of Lorraine and Grand Duke of Tuscany. Husband of Empress Maria Theresa,_{56} he died at age 56 after nominally being Emperor for 25 years. His heart is buried in the Herzgruft in the Augustinerkirche.

This double tomb of Empress Maria Theresa and her husband, Francis I Stephen, sculpted by Balthasar Ferdinand Moll is of artistic merit for its design.

In the small chamber immediately south of Emperor Joseph II_{42}:

- 43 Archduchess Maria Karolina (17 September 1748 – 17 September 1748) →Family Tree
  Still-born daughter of Emperor Franz I Stephen_{55} and Empress Maria Theresa.

Along the south wall, young children of Emperor Franz I Stephen_{55} and Empress Maria Theresa._{56} From left to right:

- 44 Archduke Karl Joseph Emanuel Johann Nepomuck Anton Prokop (1 February 1745 – 18 January 1761) →Family Tree
  Second son of Emperor Franz I Stephen_{55} and Empress Maria Theresa. Died of smallpox shortly before his 16th birthday. His heart is buried in the Herzgruft in the Augustinerkirche.
- 45 Archduchess Marie Johanna Gabriele Josephe Antonie (4 February 1750 – 23 December 1762 →Family Tree
  Eighth daughter of Emperor Franz I Stephen_{55} and Empress Maria Theresa._{56} Died of smallpox at age 12. Her heart is buried in the Herzgruft in the Augustinerkirche.
- 46 Archduchess Marie Josephe Gabriele Johanna Antonie Anna (19 March 1751 – 15 October 1767) →Family Tree
  Ninth daughter of Emperor Franz I_{55} and Empress Maria Theresa._{56} Unhappy with the marriage arranged for her, she died of smallpox the day before her wedding, at age 16.

At the southwest bend:

- 47 Unnamed princess (1744) →Family Tree
  Daughter of Prince Charles of Lorraine and Archduchess Maria Anna_{39} (sister of Empress Maria Theresa_{56}).

Along the west wall, mainly the family of Emperor Joseph II._{42} From left to right:

- 48 Archduchess Marie Elisabeth Amalie Antonie Josephe Gabriele Johanna Agathe (5 February 1737 – 7 June 1740) →Family Tree
  Three-years old, eldest daughter of Emperor Franz I Stephen_{55} and Empress Maria Theresa._{56} Her intestines are buried separately in the Ducal Crypt of the Stephansdom.
- 49 Empress Maria Josepha of Bavaria (30 March 1739 – 28 May 1767) →Family Tree
  Second wife (1765) of Emperor Joseph II._{42} She was the daughter of the only non-Habsburg Emperor since 1438, Karl VII of Bavaria and his wife, a daughter of Emperor Joseph I._{35} Especially because of the unusually potent form of smallpox of which she died at age 28, her body was not embalmed but immediately placed intact into her coffin. Her husband of 2 years had not developed a regard for her, and did not attend her funeral.
- 50 Archduchess Princess Isabella of Parma (31 December 1741 – 27 November 1763) →Family Tree
  First wife (1760) of Emperor Joseph II._{42} Daughter of Philip, Duke of Parma (1720–1765) (son of King Philip V of Spain) and Princess Marie Louise Élisabeth of France (14 August 1727 – 6 December 1759) (daughter of King Louis XV of France). Greatly beloved by her husband, at age 21 she contracted smallpox during her second pregnancy and died 5 days after giving birth to a still born daughter._{51} Under her husband's orders, her body was buried whole and unembalmed.
- 51 Archduchess Christina (22 November 1763 – 22 November 1763) →Family Tree
  Still-born second daughter of Emperor Joseph II_{42} and his first wife Archduchess Isabella._{50} Her tomb rests beneath that of her mother._{50}
- 52 Archduchess Maria Theresa (20 March 1762 – 23 January 1770) →Family Tree
  Eldest daughter of Emperor Joseph II_{42} and his first wife Archduchess Isabella._{50} Died at almost 8 years of age.
- 53 Archduchess Marie Caroline Ernestine Antonie Johanna Josephe (12 January 1740 – 25 January 1741) →Family Tree
  Third daughter of Emperor Francis I Stephen_{55} and Empress Maria Theresa._{56} Died at age 1-year. Her intestines are buried separately in the Ducal Crypt of the Stephansdom.

Beside the entrance to the Franz Vault on the north wall:

- 54 Duchess Christina of Saxony-Teschen (16 May 1767 – 17 May 1767) →Family Tree
  Infant, only child of Duke Albert of Saxony-Teschen_{111} and Archduchess Maria Christina._{112}

=== Franz Vault ===
In 1824 the four vaults of the Imperial Crypt held 78 bodies and urns containing the hearts of three other persons. In that year Emperor Franz II_{57} built the octagonal Franzensgruft, attaching it to the right wing of the Maria Theresa Vault. It is in the Biedermeier style, as are the five tombs within it.

In the center:

- 57 Emperor Franz II (Florence 12 February 1768 – Vienna 2 March 1835) →Family Tree
  Eldest son of Emperor Leopold II._{113} →Family Tree He was emperor during the times of Napoleon and Ludwig van Beethoven. He changed crowns from Franz II of the Holy Roman Empire to Franz I of the Austrian Empire in mid-reign, and thus is often denoted as Franz II/I. The full-size crown atop his tomb is that of the Austrian Empire. He died at age 67 after a reign of 43 years. His heart is buried in the Herzgruft in the Augustinerkirche. His statue, dressed as a Roman emperor, stands in the main courtyard of the Hofburg palace.

In the corners, clockwise starting from the near left (south west) corner:

- 59 Archduchess Elisabeth Wilhelmine von Württemberg-Mömpelgard (Treptow 21 April 1767 – Vienna 18 February 1790) →Family Tree
  First wife (1788) of Emperor Franz II._{57} She died at age 22 a day after giving birth to Ludovika Elisabeth Franziska._{66}
- 60 Empress Maria Theresa of Naples and Sicily (Naples 6 June 1772 – Vienna 13 April 1807) →Family Tree
  Second wife (1790) at age 18 of Emperor Franz II._{57} Mother of Empress Maria Louise_{127} (second wife of Napoleon), Emperor Ferdinand,_{62} and all subsequent children of her husband. Because her mother_{107} was a sister of her husband's father_{113} the couple were first cousins. →Family Tree (ancestors) She died at age 34 of tubercular pleurisy just days after giving premature birth to Amalia Therese._{96} Her heart is buried in the Herzgruft in the Augustinerkirche.
- 61 Empress Caroline Augusta of Bavaria (Mannheim 8 February 1792 – Vienna 9 February 1873) →Family Tree
  Fourth wife (1816) of Emperor Franz II._{57} Died the day after her 81st birthday, having survived her husband by 38 years and two reigns.
- 58 Empress Maria Ludovika of Austria-Este (Monza 14 December 1787 – Verona 7 April 1816) →Family Tree
  Third wife (1808) at age 20 of 40-year-old cousin Emperor Franz II,_{57} she contracted tuberculosis shortly after their wedding, suffering from it for the eight years of marriage before dying at age 28. Her heart is buried in the Herzgruft in the Augustinerkirche.

Until 1940, this vault also held the body of a grandson of Emperor Franz II,_{57} Franz Joseph Karl, Duke of Reichstadt_{x811} (1811–1832). →Family Tree Adolf Hitler ordered that the body be sent to France where it now rests in Les Invalides in Paris near the body of his father, Napoléon Bonaparte. His heart is still buried in the Herzgruft in the Augustinerkirche.

Through the doorway in the west wall to the left is the south part of the Tuscan Vault. In the east wall is the west entrance to the Crypt Chapel. The north wall opens into the Ferdinand Vault.

=== Ferdinand Vault ===
The Ferdinandsgruft was built in 1842, along with the Tuscan Vault, in conjunction with the reconstruction of the monastery above. Although the visitor sees an almost-empty room with only two sarcophagi, this vault actually contains one-fourth of the Imperial Crypt's entire population, walled-up into the corner piers.

Skip ahead to tombs: 64–72, 73–79, 80–87, 88–100

==== Main Hall ====
- 62 Emperor Ferdinand I of Austria (1793–1875) →Family Tree
  Son of Emperor Franz II._{57} His heart is buried in the Herzgruft in the Augustinerkirche.
- 63 Empress Maria Anna (1803–1884) →Family Tree
  Born Princess of Savoy, wife of Emperor Ferdinand I of Austria._{62}

==== Within the southwest pier ====
Nine tombs, mostly of youths:

- 64 Archduke Alexander Leopold Johann Joseph, Palatine of Hungary (Poggio Imperiale 14 August 1772 – Laxenburg 12 July 1795) →Family Tree
  Fourth son of Emperor Leopold II_{113} and Empress Maria Ludovika._{114} Died at 22. His heart is buried in the Herzgruft in the Augustinerkirche.
- 65 Archduchess Maria Amalia Josephe Johanna Katharina Theresia (Florence 15 October 1780 – Vienna 25 December 1798) →Family Tree
  Daughter of Emperor Leopold II_{113} and Empress Maria Ludovika._{114} Died at 18. Her heart is buried in the Herzgruft in the Augustinerkirche.
- 66 Archduchess Louise Elisabeth (Vienna 18 February 1790 – Vienna 24 June 1791) →Family Tree
  Infant first daughter of Emperor Franz II_{57} and Archduchess Elisabeth Wilhelmine von Württemberg._{59} Her heart is buried in the Herzgruft in the Augustinerkirche.
- 67 Archduchess Maria Eleonore of Austria-Teschen (Groß-Seelowitz 19 November 1864 – Groß-Seelowitz 9 December 1864) →Family Tree
  Infant second daughter of Archduke Karl Ferdinand._{121}
- 68 Archduke Franz Joseph of Austria-Teschen (Groß-Seelowitz 5 March 1855 – Groß-Seelowitz 13 March 1855) →Family Tree
  Infant first son of Archduke Karl Ferdinand._{121} His heart is buried in the Herzgruft in the Augustinerkirche.
- 69 Archduke Joseph Franz Leopold (Vienna 9 April 1799 – Laxenburg 30 June 1807) →Family Tree
  Second son of Emperor Franz II_{57} and Empress Maria Theresia._{60} Died at 8. His heart is buried in the Herzgruft in the Augustinerkirche.
- 70 Archduke Leopold Ludwig Maria Franz Julius Eustorgius Gerhard (Milan 6 June 1823 – Hörnstein 24 May 1898) →Family Tree
  First son of Archduke Rainer_{x783} and Elisabeth of Savoy. Died at 75.
- 71 Archduke Johann Nepomuk Karl (Vienna 29 August 1805 – Vienna 19 February 1809) →Family Tree
  Fourth son of Emperor Franz II_{57} and Empress Maria Theresia._{60} Died at 4. His heart is buried in the Herzgruft in the Augustinerkirche.
- 72 Archduke Robert Ferdinand Salvator (Salzburg 15 October 1885 – Salzburg 2 August 1895) →Family Tree
  Ten-years old, last of the 11 children of Grand Duke Ferdinand IV of Tuscany_{108} and Alicia Bourbon-Parma.

==== Within the southeast pier ====
- 73 Archduchess Maria Antonia (1858–1883) →Family Tree
  Daughter of Grand Duke Ferdinand IV of Tuscany._{108} Died at 25.
- 74 Archduchess Maria Anna (1835–1840) →Family Tree
  Daughter of Archduke Franz Karl_{135} and Sophie of Bavaria,_{137} sister of Emperor Franz Joseph_{142} Died at 5.
- 75 Archduchess Maria Carolina (1821–1844) →Family Tree
  Daughter of Archduke Rainer_{x783} and Princess Elisabeth of Savoy. Died at 23.
- 76 Archduke Ferdinand Salvator (1888–1891) →Family Tree
  Son of Archduke Karl Salvator_{90} and Maria Immakulata._{89} Died at 3.
- 77 Archduke Rainer Salvator (1880–1889) →Family Tree
  Son of Archduke Karl Salvator_{90} and Maria Immakulata._{89} Died at 9.
- 78 Archduchess Sophie Friederike (1855–1857) →Family Tree
  Daughter of Emperor Franz Joseph_{142} and Empress Elisabeth (Sisi)_{143} Died at 2.
- 79 Archduchess Karoline Ferdinanda (1793–1802) →Family Tree
  Daughter of Ferdinand III, Grand Duke of Tuscany_{x769} and Luisa Maria Amelia Teresa of Naples._{84a} Died at 9. Her heart is buried in the Herzgruft in the Augustinerkirche.

==== Within the northwest pier ====
Eight tombs, containing 9 bodies:

- 80 Archduchess Natalie Maria Theresia (Preßburg 12 January 1884 – Preßburg 23 March 1898) →Family Tree
  Fourth daughter of Archduke Friedrich of Teschen (second son of Archduke Karl Ferdinand_{121}) and Princess Isabella of Croy-Dülmen. Died at 14.
- 81 Archduchess Stephanie Maria Isabelle (Preßburg 1 May 1886 – Ostend 29 August 1890) →Family Tree
  Fifth daughter of Archduke Friedrich of Teschen (second son of Archduke Karl Ferdinand_{121}) and Princess Isabella von Croy-Dülmen. Died at 4.
- 82 Archduchess Maria Anna (Vienna 8 June 1804 – Baden bei Wien 28 December 1858) →Family Tree
  Unmarried 54-year-old daughter of Emperor Franz II_{57} and Maria Teresia_{60}. Her heart is buried in the Herzgruft in the Augustinerkirche.
- 83 Archduchess Maria Caroline Luise Christine (10 September 1825 – 17 July 1915) →Family Tree
  Daughter of Archduke Karl._{122} Wife (21 February 1852) of Archduke Ranier._{110} Died at age 89.
- 84a Grand Duchess Maria Luisa (Naples 27 July 1773 – Vienna 19 September 1802) →Family Tree
  Died in childbirth_{84b} at 29. Her heart is buried in the Herzgruft in the Augustinerkirche. Daughter of Queen Maria Karolina of Naples and Sicily._{107} First wife (1790) of Ferdinand III, Grand Duke of Tuscany._{x769} →Family Tree

- 84b Unnamed (1802) →Family Tree
  Infant son of Maria Luisa._{84a} Both died during his birth and are buried in the same coffin.
- 85 Grand Duchess Maria Antonietta Anna of the Two Sicilies (Palermo 19 December 1814 – Orth 7 November 1898) →Family Tree
  Second wife (1833) of Leopold II, Grand Duke of Tuscany._{109} Died shortly before her 84th birthday.
- 86 Grand Duchess Maria Anna of Saxony (Dresden 27 April 1796 – Schloß Brandeis, Bohemia 3 January 1865) →Family Tree
  Second wife (6 May 1821) of Ferdinand III, Grand Duke of Tuscany._{x769} Died at age 68. Her heart is buried in the Herzgruft in the Augustinerkirche.
- 87 Archduchess Caroline Ludovika Leopoldine (Vienna 9 December 1795 – Schloß Hetzendorf 30 June 1799) →Family Tree
  Fourth daughter of Emperor Franz II_{57} and Maria Theresia._{60} Died at 4. Her heart is buried in the Herzgruft in the Augustinerkirche.

==== Within the northeast pier ====
Thirteen tombs, principally members of the Tuscan line:

- 88 Archduke Albrecht Salvator Marie Joseph Ferdinand Karl Anton Johannes Xaver Aloys Rainer Klemens Roman (Alt-Bunzlau 22 November 1871 – Bolzano 27 February 1896) →Family Tree
  Son of Archduke Karl Salvator_{90} and Maria Immakulata._{89} Died at 24.
- 89 Archduchess Maria Immakulata of Bourbon-Two Sicilies (Naples 14 April 1844 – Vienna 18 February 1899) →Family Tree
  Wife of Archduke Karl Salvator._{90} Died at age 54.
- 90 Archduke Karl Salvator Giuseppe Giovanni Battista Filippo Jacopo Gennaro Lodovico Gonzaga Raniero (Florence 30 April 1839 – Vienna 18 January 1892) →Family Tree
  Son of Grand Duke Leopold II of Tuscany._{109} Among his sons was Franz Salvator, who married Marie Valerie, a daughter of Emperor Franz Joseph._{142} Died at 52.
- 91 (Urn containing the cremated remains of) Archduke Leopold Maria Alphons Blanka Karl Anton Beatrix Michael Joseph Peter Ignatz (Agram 30 January 1897 – Mansfield, Connecticut 14 March 1958) →Family Tree
  Second son of Archduke Leopold Salvator._{132} Naturalized in the US as Leopold Lorraine in 1953. Died at 61. Married morganatically.
- 92 Archduchess Maria Antonia Immakulata Josepha Ferdinanda Theresia Leopoldine Franziska Karoline Isabella Januaria Luise Christine Appolonie (Vienna 18 April 1874 – Arco 14 January 1891) →Family Tree
  Daughter of Archduke Karl Salvator_{90} and Maria Immakulata._{89}
- 93 Archduke Ernst Karl Felix Maria Rainer Gottfried Cyriak (Milan 8 August 1824 – Arco 4 April 1899) →Family Tree
  Son of Archduke Rainer_{x783} and Princess Elisabeth of Savoy. Married morganatically and his children bore the surname von Wallburg.
- 94 Archduchess Adelgunde of Bavaria (1823–1914) →Family Tree
  Wife of Archduke Franz V of Austria-Este, Duke of Modena._{101} Daughter of Ludwig I of Bavaria and sister of Hildegard of Bavaria._{129}
- 95 Archduchess Maria Karoline Leopoldine Franziska Theresia Josepha Medarde (Vienna 8 June 1794 – Vienna 16 March 1795) →Family Tree
  Daughter of Emperor Franz II_{57} and Maria Theresia._{60} Her heart is buried in the Herzgruft in the Augustinerkirche.
- 96 Archduchess Amalia Therese (Vienna 6 April 1807 – 7 April 1807) →Family Tree
  One-day-old daughter of Emperor Franz II_{57} and Maria Theresia._{60}
- 97 Archduchess Henriette Maria Immakulata Adelgunde Josepha Ferdinande Theresia Leopoldine Franziska Karoline Isabella Januaria Luise Christine Eleonore (Vienna 20 February 1884 – Traunkirchen 13 August 1886) →Family Tree
  Daughter of Archduke Karl Salvator_{90} and Maria Immakulata._{89}
- 98 Archduke Ludwig Salvator Maria Giuseppe Giovanni Battista Dominicus Raineri Ferdinando Carl Zenobius Antonin (Florence 4 August 1847 – Schloß Brandeis 12 October 1915) →Family Tree
  Son of Grand Duke Leopold II of Tuscany._{109} Sociologist and traveler of the Mediterranean.
- 99 Infanta Maria Theresia of Portugal (Kleinheubach 24 August 1855 – Vienna 12 February 1944) →Family Tree
  At age 18 she became the third wife (1873) of the twice-widowed Archduke Karl Ludwig_{138} who was 22 years older, and she survived him by 48 years. For the seven years after the death of Crown Prince Rudolf_{144} her husband was the heir-apparent and she undertook many of the representational duties neglected by the ever-travelling Empress Elisabeth ("Sissi")_{143} until her married stepson Archduke Franz Ferdinand of Austria-Este_{x863} became the heir-apparent. During World War I she worked as a nurse, and accompanied the last emperor, Karl I_{x887} into exile on Madeira but returned to spend her old age in Vienna.
- 100 Archduke Joseph Ferdinand Salvator Maria Franz Leopold Anton Albert Johann Baptist Karl Ludwig Rupert Maria Auxilatrix (Salzburg 24 May 1872 – Vienna 25 August 1942) →Family Tree
  Second son of Archduke Ferdinand IV of Tuscany._{108} Like his cousin Archduke Leopold Salvator_{132} he had an interest in ballooning, and once flew his balloon from Linz to Dieppe in only 16 hours. His interest in things aeronautical had brought him into contact with the future head of the German air force, Hermann Göring, who later used his influence to free the Archduke from the German concentration camp at Dachau in 1938 after only 80 days there. Had issue from two morganatic marriages.

=== Tuscan Vault ===
The Toscanagruft was built in 1842, along with the Ferdinand Vault. At that time there were 85 bodies plus the heart urns of three other persons in the five vaults of the crypt.

The Tuscan Vault once held many more than the present 14 tombs, but most were moved to the New Vault or enclosed within the piers of the Ferdinand Vault during the major rearrangement of 1960. The 5-meter wide vault is very large, being 21 meters long, and extends along the entire western lengths of both the Ferdinand Vault and the Franz Vault, ending only when it meets the outside wall of the west transept of the Maria Theresia Vault.

This vault takes its name from the many descendants of the younger sons of Emperor Leopold II,_{113} as Grand Duke of Tuscany, who are entombed here.

Note: the arrangement of tombs listed below was accurate before the 2003 renovation, but they have been rearranged since then.

In the archway from the Ferdinand Vault, from left to right:

- 111 Duke Albert of Saxony-Teschen (11 July 1738 – 10 February 1822) →Family Tree
  Husband of Archduchess Maria Christina._{112} The Albertina museum, in his former palace, is named for him because his collection of paintings formed the nucleus of the museum. After the early death of their only child,_{54} the couple became the adoptive parents of Archduke Karl,_{122} the victor of Aspern. His heart is buried in the Herzgruft in the Augustinerkirche.
- 112 Archduchess Maria Christina Johanna Josephe Antonia ("Mimi") (13 May 1742 – 24 June 1798) →Family Tree
  Favorite daughter of Empress Maria Theresa._{56} Her mother stalled arranged marriages until after the death of her father, Emperor Franz I Stephen,_{55} so that Maria Christina could marry for love instead of reasons of state—the only child allowed to do so. She chose Duke Albert of Teschen._{111} The famous and moving monument he erected to her memory is in the Augustinerkirche. She died of Typhus at age 56. Her heart is buried in the Herzgruft in the Augustinerkirche.
- 113 Emperor Leopold II (1747–1792) →Family Tree
  Third son of Empress Maria Theresa._{56} →Family Tree Most of his career was spent in Florence, reforming the governance there as Grand Duke of Tuscany, and only his final two years were as Emperor. His heart is buried in the Herzgruft in the Augustinerkirche.
- 114 Empress Maria Ludovika (24 November 1745 – 15 May 1792) →Family Tree
  Originally contracted to marry Empress Maria Theresa's_{56} second son, Archduke Karl Joseph,_{44} his early death diverted her instead to the third son, who later became Emperor Leopold II._{113} In the course of 21 years, she bore her not-always-faithful husband 16 children, among them Emperor Francis II,_{57} and Archduke Karl_{122} the victor of Aspern. Grieving for her husband, she outlived him by only two months leaving many small children. Her heart is buried in the Herzgruft in the Augustinerkirche.

Behind them, from left to right:

- 105 Archduke Ferdinand Karl Anton Joseph Johann Stanislaus (1 June 1754 – 24 December 1806) →Family Tree
  Fourth son of Empress Maria Theresa._{56} Governor of Lombardy and, later, the Austrian Netherlands. Founder of the House of Austria-Este._{102}, _{x779} His heart is buried in the Herzgruft in the Augustinerkirche.
- 106 Archduchess Maria Beatrix of Este (7 April 1750 – 14 November 1829) →Family Tree
  Wife of Archduke Ferdinand Karl Anton._{105}
- 107 Queen Maria Carolina of Naples and Sicily 1752–1814) →Family Tree
  Daughter of Empress Maria Theresa._{56} Wife of King Ferdinand I of the Two Sicilies. Almost everyone buried in the Imperial Crypt who was born after 1765 is a descendant of her or her brother Emperor Leopold II._{113} Her heart is buried in the Herzgruft in the Augustinerkirche.

To the right of the archway, along the north wall, from left to right:

- 108 Archduke Ferdinand IV, Grand Duke of Tuscany Salvatore Maria Giuseppe Giovanni Battista Francesco Lodovico Gonzaga Raffaele Ranerio Gennaro (1835–1908) →Family Tree
  Son of Archduke Leopold II,_{109} Grand Duke of Tuscany. Married (1856) Anne of Saxony (Dresden 4 January 1836 – Naples 10 February 1859), then (1868) Alicia of Bourbon-Parma (Parma 27 December 1849 – Schwertberg 16 January 1935). Lost his throne, nine months after his father_{109} had abdicated it to him, when Tuscany was annexed to Italy in 1860.
- 109 Archduke Leopold II, Grand Duke of Tuscany (3 October 1797 – 29 January 1870) →Family Tree
  Son of Ferdinand III, Grand Duke of Tuscany._{x769} Abdicated his throne in 1859 in favor of his son._{108}
- 110 Archduke Rainer Ferdinand Maria Johann Evangelist Franz Ignaz (11 January 1827 – 27 January 1913) →Family Tree
  Son of Archduke Rainer._{x783} Married Archduchess Marie Karoline._{83} A major ancient manuscript collector, his 100,000-piece collection is the nucleus of the Papyrus Museum of the Austrian National Library.

To the left of the archway, along the west wall, from left to right:

- 102 Archduke Ferdinand Karl of Austria-Este (1781–1850) →Family Tree
  Son of Archduke Ferdinand Karl Anton._{105} Military commander during the Napoleonic Wars. His heart is buried in the Herzgruft in the Augustinerkirche.
- 103 Archduke Anton Viktor (31 August 1779 – 2 April 1835) →Family Tree
  Eighth son of Emperor Leopold II._{113} Last Grand Master of the Order of Teutonic Knights before Napoleon suppressed it outside of the Habsburg lands. It still functions today, as a religious order operating charitable hospitals in Europe. His heart is buried in the Herzgruft in the Augustinerkirche.
- 104 Archduke Ludwig Joseph (13 December 1784 – 21 December 1864) →Family Tree
  Eleventh son of Emperor Leopold II._{113} Promoter of industrialization in Austria after studying its success in England. Member of the Council of State that exercised power during the reign of the feeble-minded Emperor Ferdinand_{62} of Austria. His heart is buried in the Herzgruft in the Augustinerkirche.

In front of them, along the east wall:

- 101 Archduke Franz V of Austria-Este, Duke of Modena (1819–1875) →Family Tree
  Son of Franz IV of Austria-Este._{x779} After the death of his mother Maria Beatrice of Savoy in 1840, he was considered the legitimate heir to the British throne by Jacobites. He was the last reigning Duke of Modena, which was forcibly incorporated into the new Kingdom of Italy in 1860. Having no surviving descendant, he left most of his huge estate to his ill-fated cousin Archduke Franz Ferdinand,_{x863} who subsequently used the title Archduke of Austria-Este. The art collection of his now-extinct branch, accumulated over centuries, is now in the Kunsthistorisches Museum.

=== New Vault ===
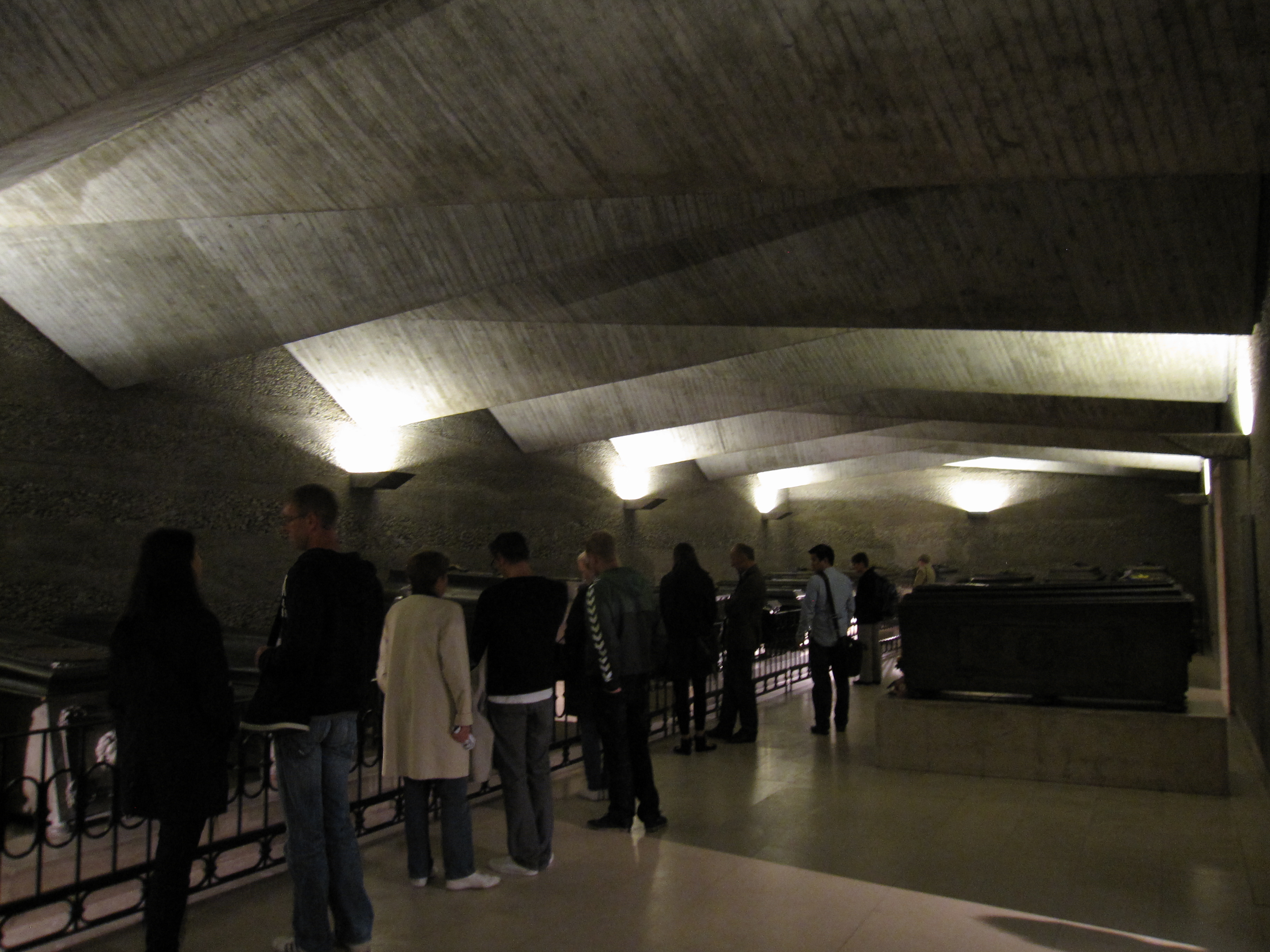
New Vault

The Neue Gruft was built between 1960 and 1962 under the monastery grounds as a 280 square meter enlargement to eliminate the overcrowded jumble of 140 bodies (plus cremation and heart urns of four other persons) in the other nine vaults, and to provide a climate-controlled environment to protect the metal sarcophagi from further deterioration. Its stark concrete walls evoke the solemnity of death. The New Vault is entered from the Ferdinand Vault, and exits into the back of the Franz Joseph Vault. It contains 26 sarcophagi:

Skip ahead to tombs: 115–119, 120–126, 127, 128–134, 135–141

==== West Wall ====
To the left of the entrance, proceeding along the west wall from south to north, the "Bishops Row":

- 115 Archduke Leopold Wilhelm (6 April 1614 – 20 November 1662) →Family Tree
  Son of Emperor Ferdinand II._{x578} Named at age 13 to take over his uncle Leopold's renounced see at Halberstaedt (when he became 22, this was confirmed by the Pope) and later became also Bishop of Olomouc, Bishop of Breslau, and Grand Master of the Teutonic Knights. His heart is buried in the Herzgruft in the Augustinerkirche and his intestines are buried separately in the Ducal Crypt of the Stephansdom.
- 116 Archduke Karl Joseph (7 August 1649 – 27 January 1664) →Family Tree
  Son of Emperor Ferdinand III_{27} and Empress Maria Leopoldina,_{21} who died during his birth. Bishop of Olomouc and Grand Master of the Teutonic Knights at age 13 as heir to his uncle, Archduke Leopold Wilhelm._{115} The art collection he inherited from Archduke Leopold Wilhelm_{115} became the foundation of the Kunsthistorisches Museum. Died at age 15. His intestines are buried separately in the Ducal Crypt of the Stephansdom.
- 117 Karl Joseph of Lorraine (1680–1715) →Family Tree
  Son of Archduchess Eleonora Maria_{18} and Charles V, Duke of Lorraine. Archbishop of Trier. Uncle of Emperor Franz I Stephen,_{55} the husband of Empress Maria Theresia._{56} He died unexpectedly of smallpox while visiting Vienna and, not being a Habsburg in the male line nor married to one, was originally buried in the Minoritenkirche but was brought here the next year.

- Urn containing heart of Archbishop Karl Joseph of Lorraine,_{117} placed atop his sarcophagus.

- 118 Archduke Maximilian Franz (8 December 1756 – 26 July 1801) →Family Tree
  Youngest son of Empress Maria Theresia._{56} Archbishop of Cologne. His heart is buried in the Herzgruft in the Augustinerkirche.
- 119 Archduke Rudolph (8 January 1788 – 24 July 1831) →Family Tree
  Youngest son of Emperor Leopold II._{113} Cardinal and Archbishop of Olomouc. A piano pupil of Ludwig van Beethoven, Beethoven dedicated 14 compositions to him, including the Archduke Trio and his great Missa Solemnis. He, in turn, dedicated one of his own compositions to Beethoven.

==== South Wall ====
Along the south wall:

- 127 Empress Maria Louise (1791–1847) →Family Tree
  Daughter of Emperor Franz II._{57} Empress of France as second wife of Napoléon Bonaparte, later Duchess of Parma in her own right.

==== North Wall ====
Proceeding along the north wall, from west to east, the first ledge contains the immediate family of Archduke Karl_{122} the victor of Aspern:

- 120 Archduke Wilhelm Franz Karl (21 April 1827 – 29 July 1894) →Family Tree
  Youngest son of Archduke Karl._{122} Became Grand Master of the Teutonic Knights.
- 121 Archduke Karl Ferdinand (1818–1874) →Family Tree
  Son of Archduke Karl._{122}
- 122 Archduke Karl "the victor of Aspern" (1771–1847) →Family Tree
  Duke of Teschen, third son of Emperor Leopold II._{113} He was adopted by the childless Albert of Saxony-Teschen_{111} and Archduchess Maria Christina._{112} A statue of him on horseback, holding the regimental colors aloft to rally his troops against Napoleon, stands in the Heldenplatz in Vienna. His heart is buried in the Herzgruft in the Augustinerkirche.
- 123 Archduchess Henriette of Nassau-Weilburg (30 October 1797 – 29 December 1829) →Family Tree
  Wife of Archduke Karl._{122} She is the only Protestant buried here, after Emperor Franz II_{57} overrode the resistance of the resident clergy.

- Urn with heart and entrails of Henriette of Nassau-Weilburg._{123}

- 125 Archduke Rudolph Franz (1822–1822) →Family Tree
  Infant son of Archduke Karl._{122} His heart is buried in the Herzgruft in the Augustinerkirche.

On its own pedestal, directly across from the tomb of Empress Maria Louise_{127}:

- 126 Emperor Maximilian I of Mexico (1832–1867) →Family Tree
  Second son of Archduke Franz Karl_{135} and brother of Emperor Franz Joseph._{142} Created Emperor of Mexico by France and the Mexican Conservative rival government, he was overthrown and executed by forces of the warring Mexican Liberals, who would go on to restore the Republic.

The next ledge along the north wall, from left to right, mostly contains the family of Archduke Albrecht_{128} a great military commander of the following generation:

- 128 Archduke Albrecht (1817–1895) →Family Tree
  Eldest son of Archduke Karl._{122} Because of a distinguished military career, an equestrian statue of him was erected on the ramp outside of his former home, the Albertina in Vienna.
- 129 Archduchess Hildegard of Bavaria (10 June 1825 – 2 April 1864) →Family Tree
  Wife of Archduke Albrecht._{128} Sister of Adelgunde of Bavaria._{94} Her heart is buried in the Herzgruft in the Augustinerkirche.
- 130 Archduchess Mathilde of Austria-Teschen (25 January 1849 – 6 June 1867) →Family Tree
  Daughter of Archduke Albrecht._{128} At age 18, trying to hide a burning cigarette behind her back, she set her clothes afire and died from her injuries. Her heart is buried in the Herzgruft in the Augustinerkirche.
- 131 Archduke Karl Albert of Austria-Teschen (1847–1848) →Family Tree
  Infant son of Archduke Albrecht._{128}
- 132 Archduke Leopold Salvator Maria Joseph Ferdinand Franz von Assisi Karl Anton von Padua Johann Baptist Januarius Aloys Gonzaga Ranier Wenzel Gallus (Alt-Bunzlau, Bohemia 15 October 1863 – Vienna 4 September 1931) →Family Tree
  Eldest son of Archduke Karl Salvator._{90} During a brilliant military career, he reorganized and modernized the Austrian artillery, becoming Inspector General in 1908. He flew hot air balloons and work on the development of airships. He grew rich from his inventions such as all-wheel drive and half-track trucks for the army. Married (1889) Blanca Infanta of Spain (Graz 7 Sep 1868 – Viareggio 25 Oct 1949).
- 133 Archduke Rainer Karl Leopold Blanka Anton Margarita Beatrix Maria Peter Joseph Raphael Michael Ignatius Stephan (Zagreb 21 November 1895 – Vienna 25 May 1930) →Family Tree
  First son of Archduke Leopold Salvator._{132} Unmarried.
- 134 Archduchess Margarete Karoline of Saxony (24 May 1840 – 15 September 1858) →Family Tree
  First wife (1856) of her mother's nephew, Archduke Karl Ludwig._{138} The marriage had not yet produced any children when she fell ill of typhus while on holiday in Monza and died at age 18. Her heart is buried in the Hofkapelle in Innsbruck.

==== East Wall ====
Proceeding along the east wall, from north to south, the direct ancestors of the last emperors:

- 135 Archduke Franz Karl (1802–1878) →Family Tree
  Third son of Emperor Franz II._{57} When his elder brother Emperor Ferdinand_{62} abdicated in 1848, he stood aside so that his son, Emperor Franz Joseph,_{142} could succeed to the throne instead. Great grandfather of the last reigning emperor, Emperor Karl I._{x887} His heart is buried in the Herzgruft in the Augustinerkirche.
- 136 Unnamed (1840) →Family Tree
  Infant son of Archduke Franz Karl._{135}
- 137 Archduchess Sophie (1805–1872) →Family Tree
  Wife (1824) of Archduke Franz Karl._{135} Friendly with Napoleon's son_{x811} in her youth. She tried to arrange a marriage between her son Emperor Franz Joseph_{142} and the eldest daughter of her sister, but he chose the youngest daughter "Sissi"_{143} instead.
- 138 Archduke Karl Ludwig (1833–1896) →Family Tree
  Third son of Archduke Franz Karl._{135} Brother of Emperor Franz Joseph,_{142} father of Archduke Franz Ferdinand of Austria-Este_{x863} and Otto_{140} and grandfather of Emperor Karl I._{x887} After the death of Crown Prince Rudolf_{144} he was the heir-presumptive.
- 139 Archduchess Maria Annunciata of Bourbon-Sicily (24 March 1843 – 4 May 1871) →Family Tree
  Second wife (1862) of Archduke Karl Ludwig._{138} Sister of Maria Immakulata of Bourbon – Two Sicilies._{89}
- 140 Archduke Otto "der Schöne" (the gorgeous) (1865–1906) →Family Tree
  Second son of Archduke Karl Ludwig._{138} Father of Emperor Karl I._{x887} Usually remembered for the widely circulated story that he had been spotted in a hallway at the Hotel Sacher about to enter a lady's room, wearing only a sword.
- 141 Archduchess Maria Josepha of Saxony (31 May 1867 – 28 May 1944) →Family Tree
  Wife (1886) of Archduke Otto._{140} She strove to keep her children away from the influence of her notorious husband, and her ability to avoid excessive displays of grief when he died was much noted. She would probably wish her tomb was not exactly where it now is. She accompanied the last reigning emperor, Karl I_{x887} into exile, and spent the remainder of her life with his family after his death.

=== Franz Joseph Vault ===
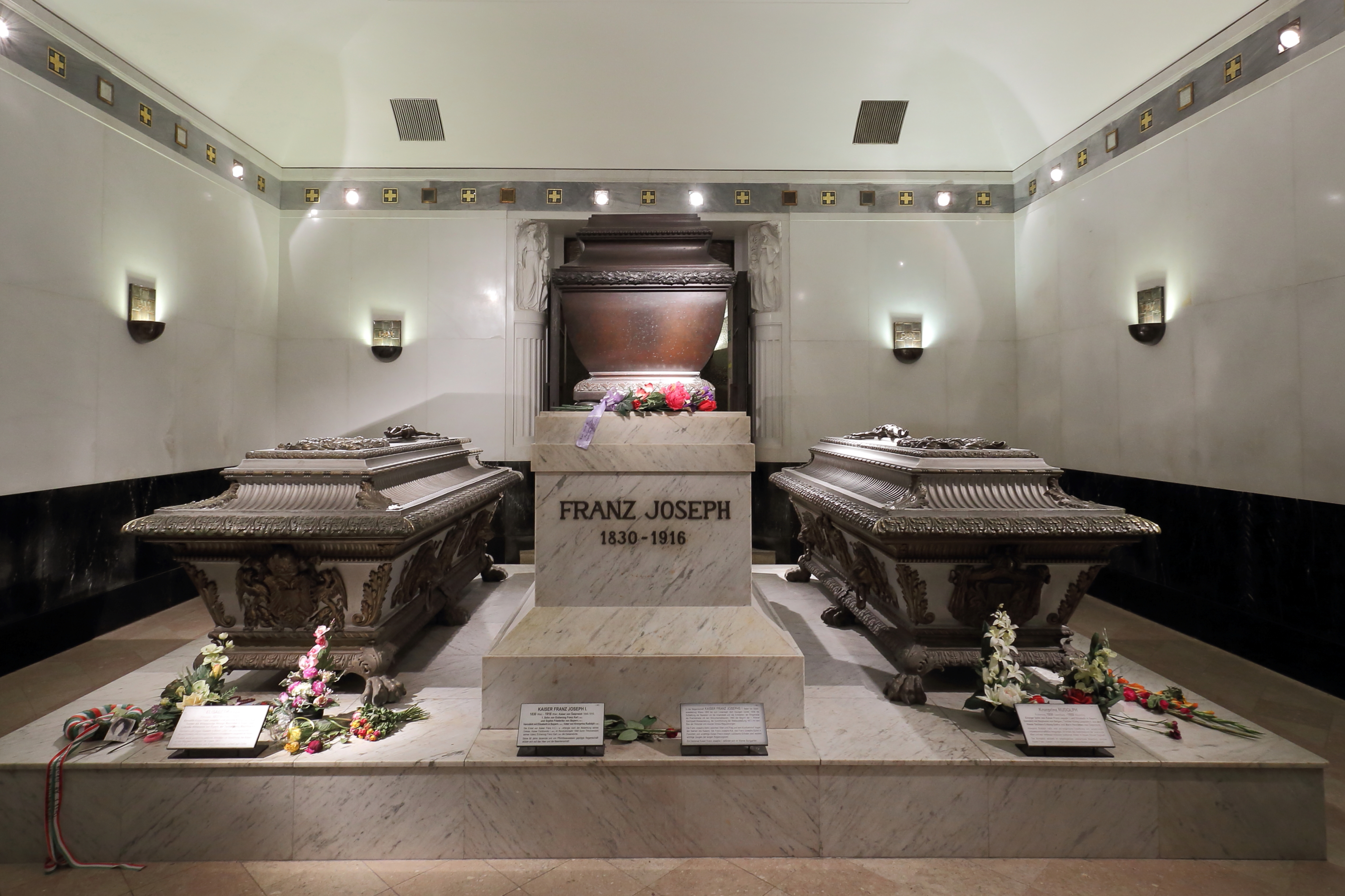
Tomb of Franz Joseph I, flanked by his wife Elisabeth and son Rudolf

By 1908 the seven vaults of the crypt already held 129 bodies, plus the heart urns of another three persons. In that year the Franz Josephs Gruft was built, along with the adjacent Chapel, as part of the celebrations of Emperor Franz Joseph's_{142} 60 years on the throne. The vault is usually entered from the north wall in the rear, through the southeast door of the New Vault.

From the foot of the tombs, left to right:

- 143 Empress Elisabeth of Bavaria ("Sisi") (1837–1898) →Family Tree
  Wife of Emperor Franz Joseph._{142}
- 142 Emperor Franz Joseph I (1830–1916) →Family Tree
  Son of Archduke Franz Karl._{135}
- 144 Archduke Rudolf (1858–1889) →Family Tree
  Son of Emperor Franz Joseph._{142}

Turning around from the foot of the tombs, the doorway on the south wall of this vault leads into the Crypt Chapel.

=== Crypt Chapel ===
The Gruftkapelle was built, along with the Franz Joseph Vault, in 1908. It is usually entered from the south doorway of the Franz Joseph Vault.

As one enters, to the right extending from the west wall:

- 149 Archduchess Yolande
  (1923–2023), wife (1950) of Archduke Carl Ludwig_{148}
- 148 Archduke Carl Ludwig
  (10 March 1918 – 11 December 2007), son of Emperor Karl I_{x887} of Austria.
- 146 Empress Zita of Bourbon-Parma (1892–1989) →Family Tree
  Wife (1911) of Emperor Karl I_{x887} of Austria. The hearts of this couple are in the crypt of the Loretto Chapel of the Benedictine Monastery at Muri, Switzerland.
- A memorial tablet to "the first victims of the World War 1914–1918", Archduke Franz Ferdinand_{x863} (1863–1914), son of Archduke Karl Ludwig,_{138} and to Franz Ferdinand's wife, Sophie, Duchess of Hohenberg_{x868} (1868–1914). Because Sophie could not be buried here, the couple is buried instead in the crypt of the castle at Artstetten.

Ahead, to the right of the altar along the south wall:

- 150 Archduke Otto (1912–2011) →Family Tree
  , eldest son of Emperor Karl I of Austria_{x887} and claimant to the thrones (renounced in 1961) and later (1979) elected by German voters to a seat in the European Parliament, where after many reelections he served longer than any other member.

To the left of the altar:

- 151 Archduchess Regina (1925–2010)
  , wife of Archduke Otto_{150}.

To the left, in front of the east wall:

- A statue of the Madonna, presented by Hungarian ladies in 1899 as a memorial to Empress Elisabeth of Bavaria._{143}

In the far-right (southeast) corner:

- A memorial bust of (Blessed) Emperor Karl I of Austria_{x887} (1887–1922), the last reigning Emperor, whose body is buried in the Nossa Senhora do Monte church in Funchal on the Portuguese island of Madeira. →Family Tree

The doorway to the right enters the east side of the Franz Vault; the west doorway, to the left, is an exit stairway.

== Selected other Habsburgs ==
Not all of the significant Habsburgs are entombed here. Those referred to in this article but resting elsewhere are:

- x415 Emperor Frederick III ("AEIOU") (1415–1493), in the Stephansdom, Vienna.
- x459 Emperor Maximilian I (1459–1519) →Family Tree
  Son of Emperor Frederick III._{x415} Buried in the St. Georgskathedrale, Wiener Neustadt.
- x457 Duchess Mary of Burgundy (1457–1482) →Family Tree
  Wealthy heiress of Burgundy, wife of Emperor Maximilian I._{x459} Buried in the Church of Our Lady, Bruges.
- x478 King Philip I of Castile (1478–1506) →Family Tree
  Son of Emperor Maximilian I._{x459} Buried in the Capilla Real, Granada.
- x500 Emperor Charles V (1500–1556) →Family Tree
  Eldest son of King Philip I of Castile._{x478} Buried in the crypt of El Escorial, near Madrid.

- his descendant successors as Kings of Spain, in the crypt of El Escorial, near Madrid.

- x503 Emperor Ferdinand I (1503–1564) →Family Tree
  Second son of King Philip I of Castile_{x478} and brother of Emperor Charles V._{x500} Buried in St. Vitus Cathedral, Prague.
- x527 Emperor Maximilian II (1527–1576) →Family Tree
  Eldest son of Emperor Ferdinand I._{x503} Buried in St. Vitus Cathedral, Prague.
- x552 Emperor Rudolf II (1552–1612) →Family Tree
  Son of Emperor Maximilian II._{x527} Buried in St. Vitus Cathedral, Prague.
- x540 Archduke Charles II of Styria (1540–1590) →Family Tree
  Third son of Emperor Ferdinand I._{x503} Buried in the Stiftsbasilika, in Seckau.

- his descendants, the Inner Austria line, in the Stiftsbasilika in Seckau.

After the Imperial Crypt opened in 1632:

- x578 Emperor Ferdinand II (1578–1637) →Family Tree
  Eldest son of Archduke Charles II of Styria._{x540} Buried in the Grazer Dom, Graz.

- his descendants, the Austrian Line, are the major group entombed in this Imperial Crypt.

- x755 Queen Marie Antoinette (1755–1793) →Family Tree
  Daughter of Empress Maria Theresa._{56} Buried in Saint Denis Basilica in Paris.
- x769 Archduke Ferdinand III, Grand Duke of Tuscany (1769–1824) →Family Tree
  Son of Emperor Leopold II._{113} →Family Tree Buried in the Basilica of San Lorenzo in Florence.
- x779 Archduke Francis IV, Duke of Modena (1779–1846) →Family Tree
  Son of Archduke Ferdinand Karl Anton._{105} Buried in the Chiesa di San Vincenzo in Modena.
- x783 Archduke Rainer (30 September 1783 – 16 January 1853) →Family Tree
  Son of Emperor Leopold II._{113} Buried in the Maria Himmelfahrtskirche in Bolzano (Italy).
- x811 Prince Franz Joseph Karl, Duke of Reichstadt (1811–1832) →Family Tree
  Son of Napoléon Bonaparte and Empress Maria Louise._{127} Buried in Les Invalides in Paris.
- x856 Archduke Friedrich Maria Albrecht Wilhelm Karl, Duke of Teschen (Groß-Seelowitz 4 June 1856 – Ungarisch-Altenburg 30 December 1936) →Family Tree
  Second son of Archduke Karl Ferdinand_{121} Buried in the Pfarrkirche in Ungarisch-Altenburg (now Mosonmagyaróvár), Hungary.
- x863 Archduke Franz Ferdinand of Austria-Este (1863–1914) →Family Tree
  Heir Apparent, eldest son of Archduke Karl Ludwig._{138} Buried in the Schlosskapelle at Artstetten.
- x868 Duchess Sophie of Hohenberg (1868–1914) →Family Tree
  Born Countess Chotek, wife of Archduke Franz Ferdinand of Austria-Este._{x863} Buried in the Schlosskapelle at Artstetten.
- x887 Emperor Charles I (1887–1922) →Family Tree
  Eldest son of Archduke Otto Franz._{140} Buried in the Nossa Senhora do Monte church in Monte (Funchal) on the Portuguese island of Madeira.

== Future entombments ==
Archduchess Yolande (1923–2023), wife (1950) of Archduke Carl Ludwig_{148}, was the most recent entombment in the Crypt, taking the final reserved space within the Crypt Chapel. There is room for two others along the east wall.

Any other entombments would most easily be located along the south wall in the New Vault. There is also room in the Tuscan Vault, but that would not follow the generally chronological arrangement of the tombs.

Cremated remains can be accommodated within the piers in the corners of the Ferdinand Vault.

Since 1971 members of the family (e.g. Archduke Rudolf (1919–2010)) are mostly entombed in the crypt of the Loretto Chapel of the Benedictine Monastery at Muri, Switzerland, which was founded in 1027 by Count Radebot von Habsburg.

== Genealogies ==
=== Founders' family ===
This group covers the founders of the Imperial Crypt (and the first to be buried here), Empress Anna of Tyrol_{1} and her cousin and husband Emperor Mathias._{2} They are shown with their descent from Emperor Friedrich III_{x415} and their relationship to their successor, Emperor Ferdinand II._{x578}

For the tomb location and specifics on any person buried in the Imperial Crypt, find the tomb number located next to the person's name on the chart below then click on the appropriate group of tomb numbers: 1–2, 3–32, 33–40, 41–56, 57–61, 62–100 101–114, 115–141, 142–144, 147–151, (x415–x887 are buried elsewhere).

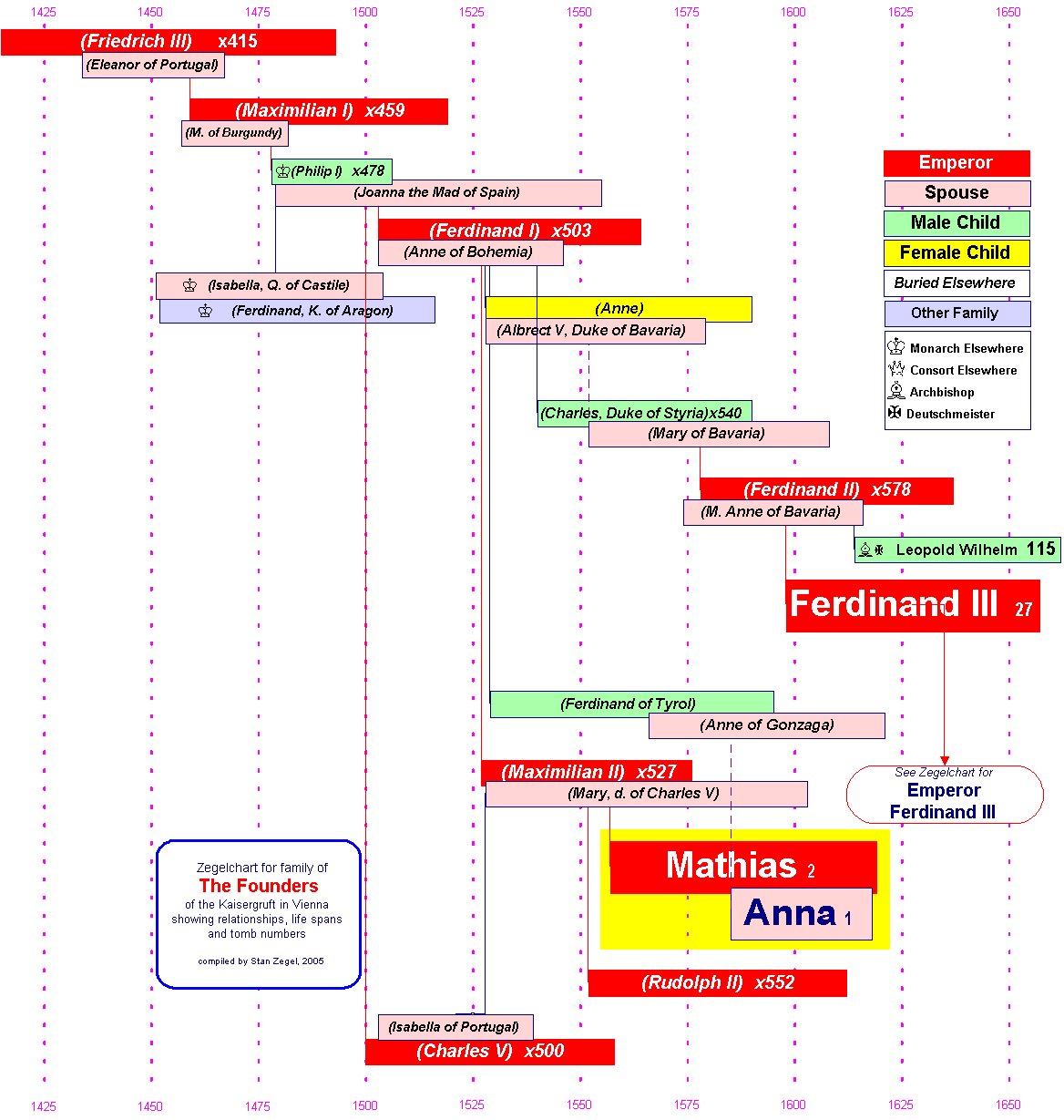

=== Emperor Ferdinand III's family ===
This group shows descendants of Emperor Ferdinand III_{27} through the extinction of the male Habsburg line with the death of Emperor Charles VI._{40}

For the tomb location and specifics on any person buried in the Imperial Crypt, find the tomb number located next to the person's name on the chart below then click on the appropriate group of tomb numbers: 1–2, 3–32, 33–40, 41–56, 57–61, 62–100 101–114, 115–141, 142–144, 147–151, (x415–x887 are buried elsewhere).

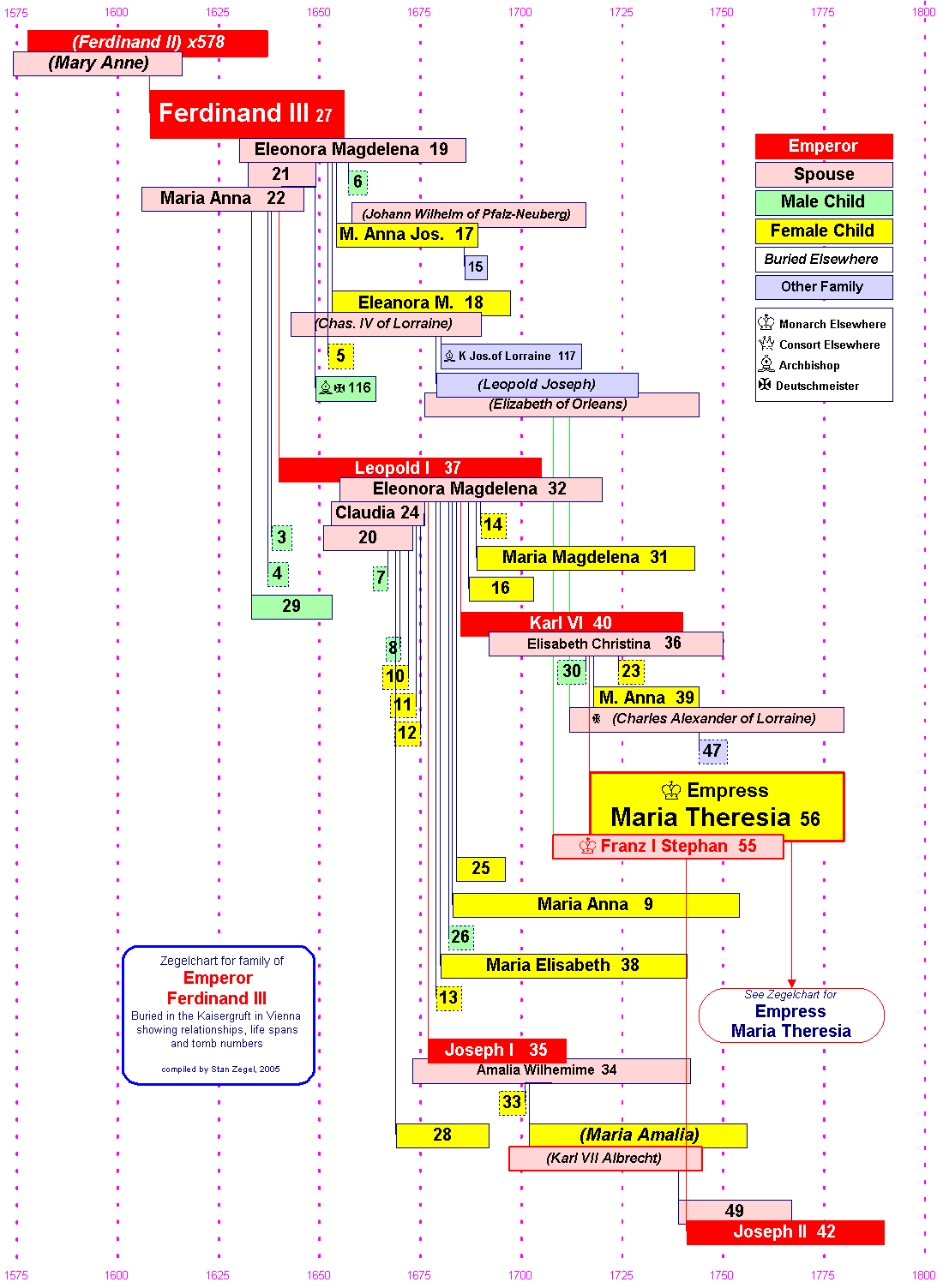

=== Empress Maria Theresa's family ===
The male Habsburg line had become extinct upon the death of Emperor Charles VI_{40}, so Empress Maria Theresa's_{56} marriage to the Duke of Lorraine_{55} established the House of Habsburg-Lorraine which continues through the following charts and has many living members today.

For the tomb location and specifics on any person buried in the Imperial Crypt, find the tomb number located next to the person's name on the chart below then click on the appropriate group of tomb numbers: 1–2, 3–32, 33–40, 41–56, 57–61, 62–100 101–114, 115–141, 142–144, 147–151, (x415–x887 are buried elsewhere).

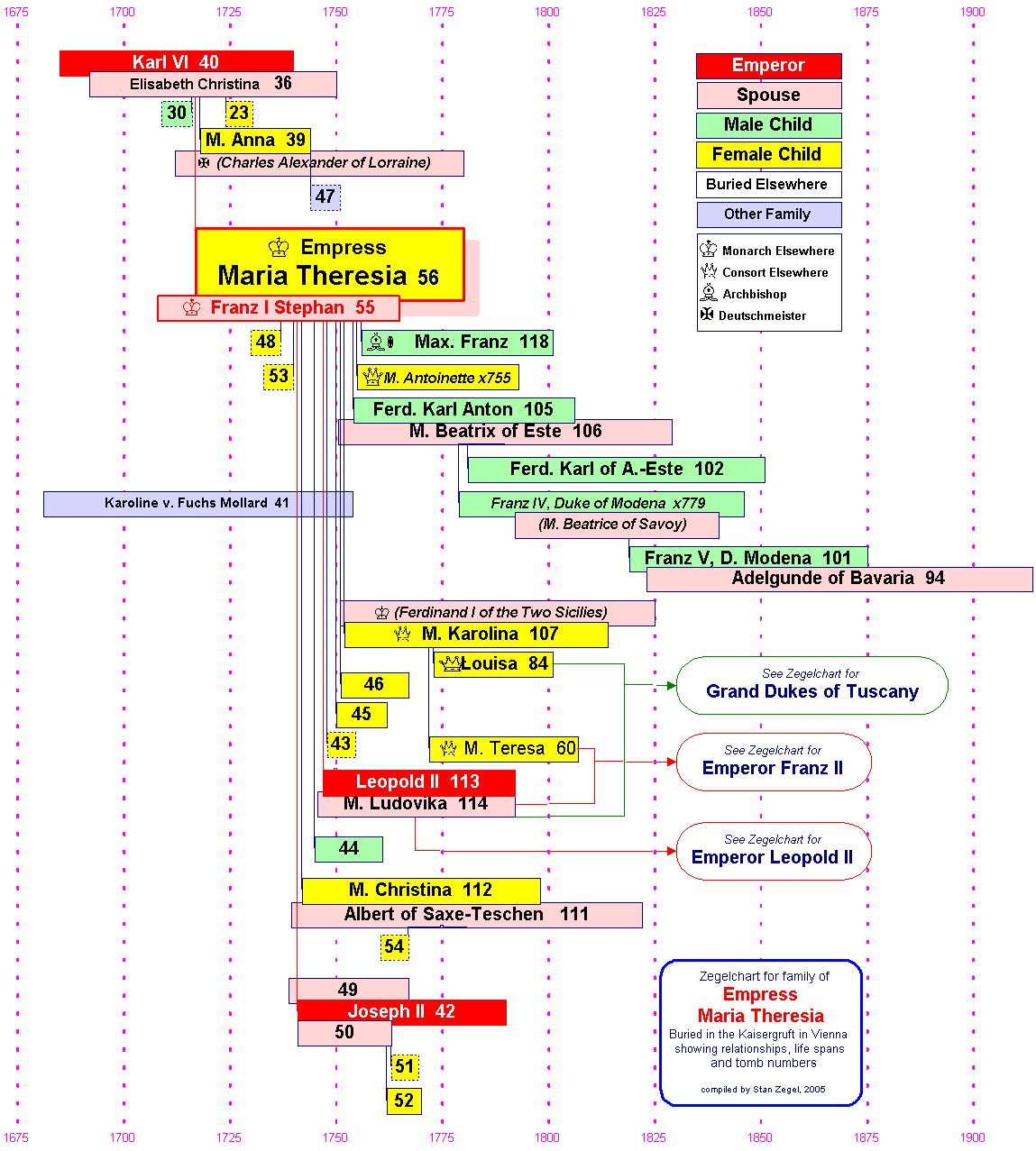

=== Emperor Leopold II's family ===
This group shows offspring of Empress Maria Theresa's_{56} second son, Emperor Leopold II_{113} and how they split into two major lines and some minor ones. All of those born Habsburg after the time of Maria Theresa who are buried here are descended from Emperor Leopold II.

For the tomb location and specifics on any person buried in the Imperial Crypt, find the tomb number located next to the person's name on the chart below then click on the appropriate group of tomb numbers: 1–2, 3–32, 33–40, 41–56, 57–61, 62–100 101–114, 115–141, 142–144, 147–151, (x415–x887 are buried elsewhere).

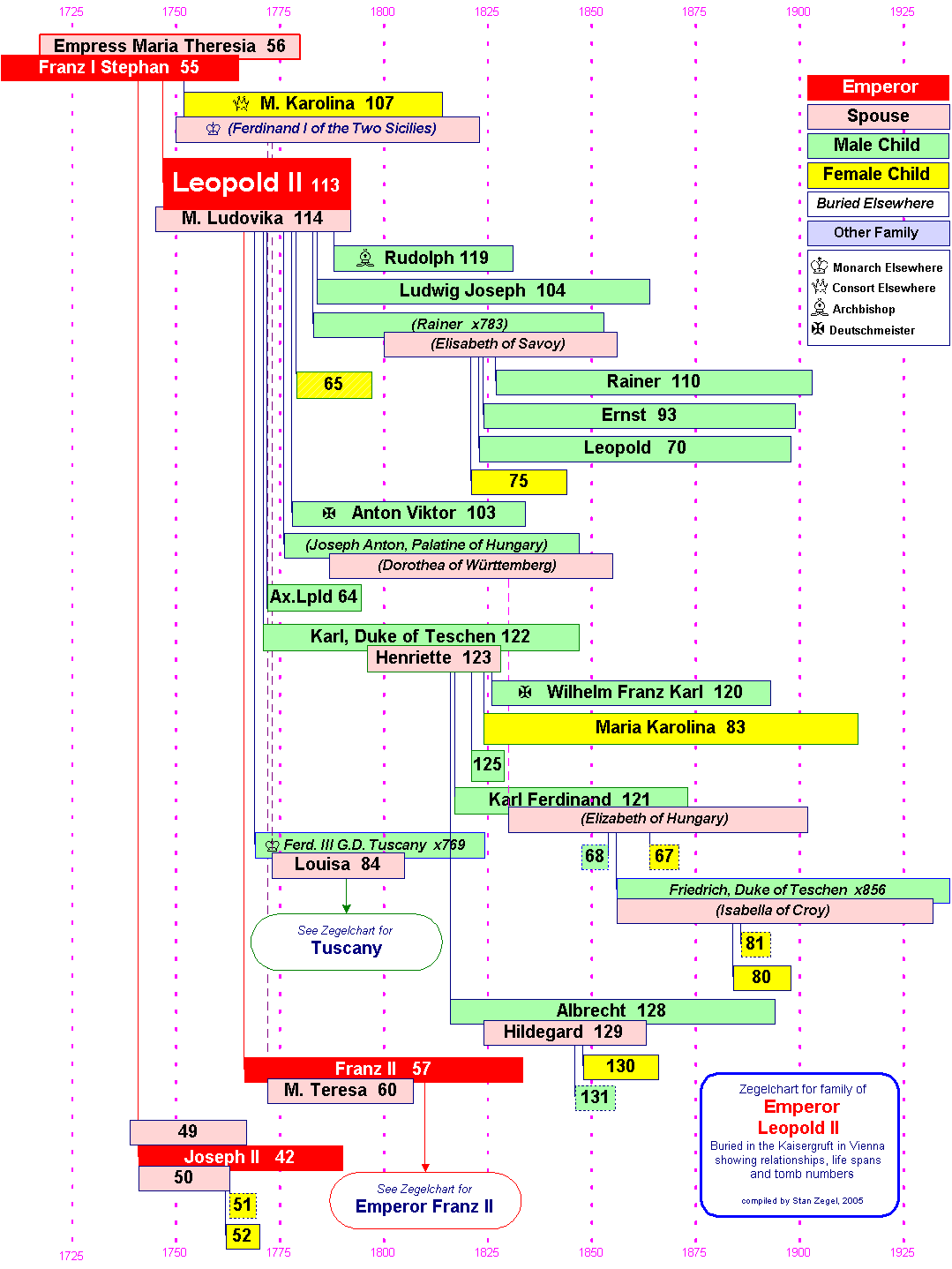

=== Emperor Francis II's family ===
This group covers the ruling line from the ascent of Emperor Franz II_{57} (1792) to the end of the monarchy (1918).

For the tomb location and specifics on any person buried in the Imperial Crypt, find the tomb number located next to the person's name on the chart below then click on the appropriate group of tomb numbers: 1–2, 3–32, 33–40, 41–56, 57–61, 62–100 101–114, 115–141, 142–144, 147–151, (x415–x887 are buried elsewhere).

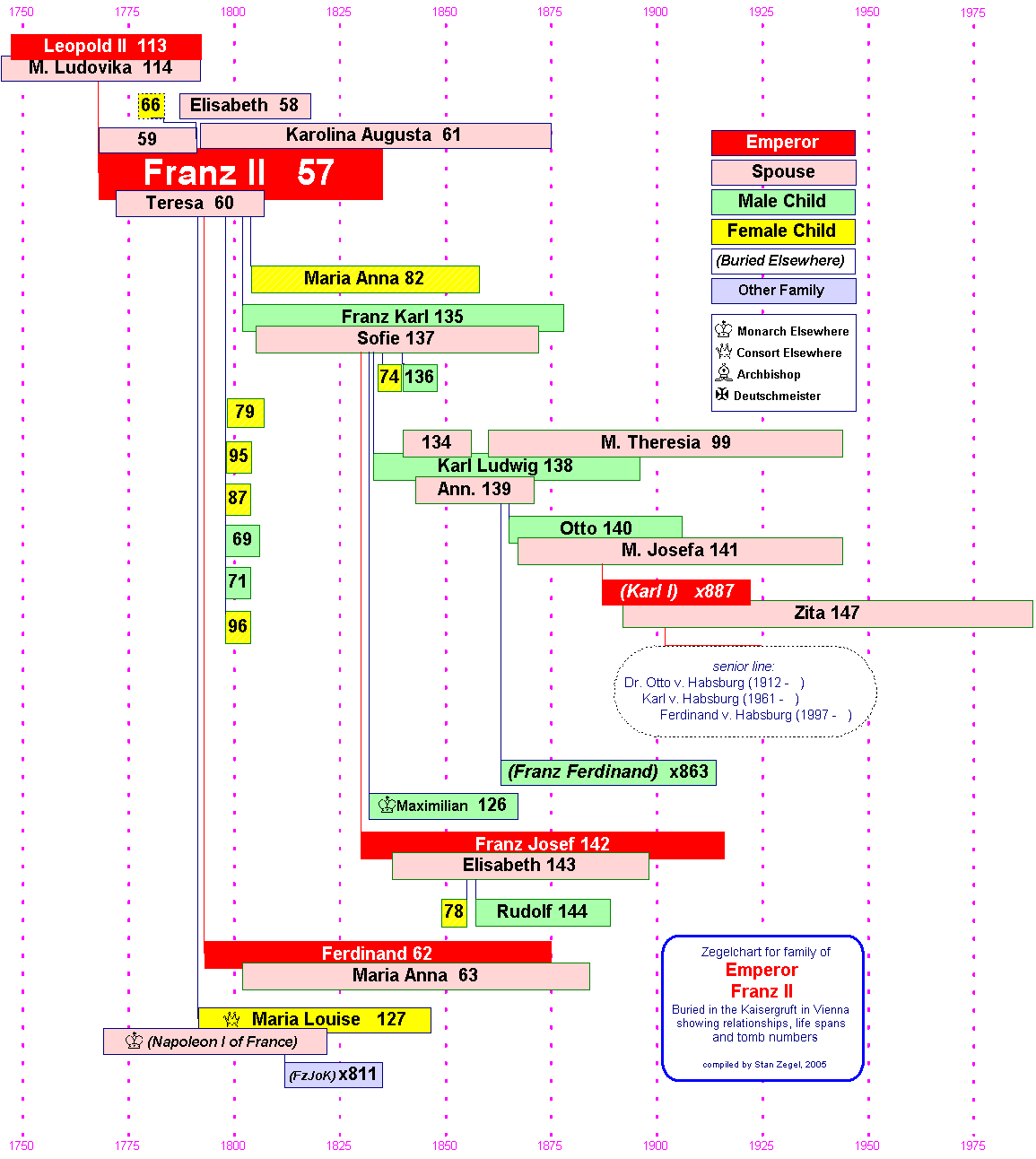

=== Tuscan line ===
When the second son of Empress Maria Theresa_{56} was called from his post of Grand Duke of Tuscany to become Emperor, he separated the Grand Duchy from the inheritance that goes with the imperial crown, installing his second son, Ferdinand_{x769} and his heirs as successors to those lands and that title. This group shows that line until the absorption of Tuscany into the Kingdom of Italy.

For the tomb location and specifics on any person buried in the Imperial Crypt, find the tomb number located next to the person's name on the chart below then click on the appropriate group of tomb numbers: 1–2, 3–32, 33–40, 41–56, 57–61, 62–100 101–114, 115–141, 142–144, 147–151, (x415–x887 are buried elsewhere).

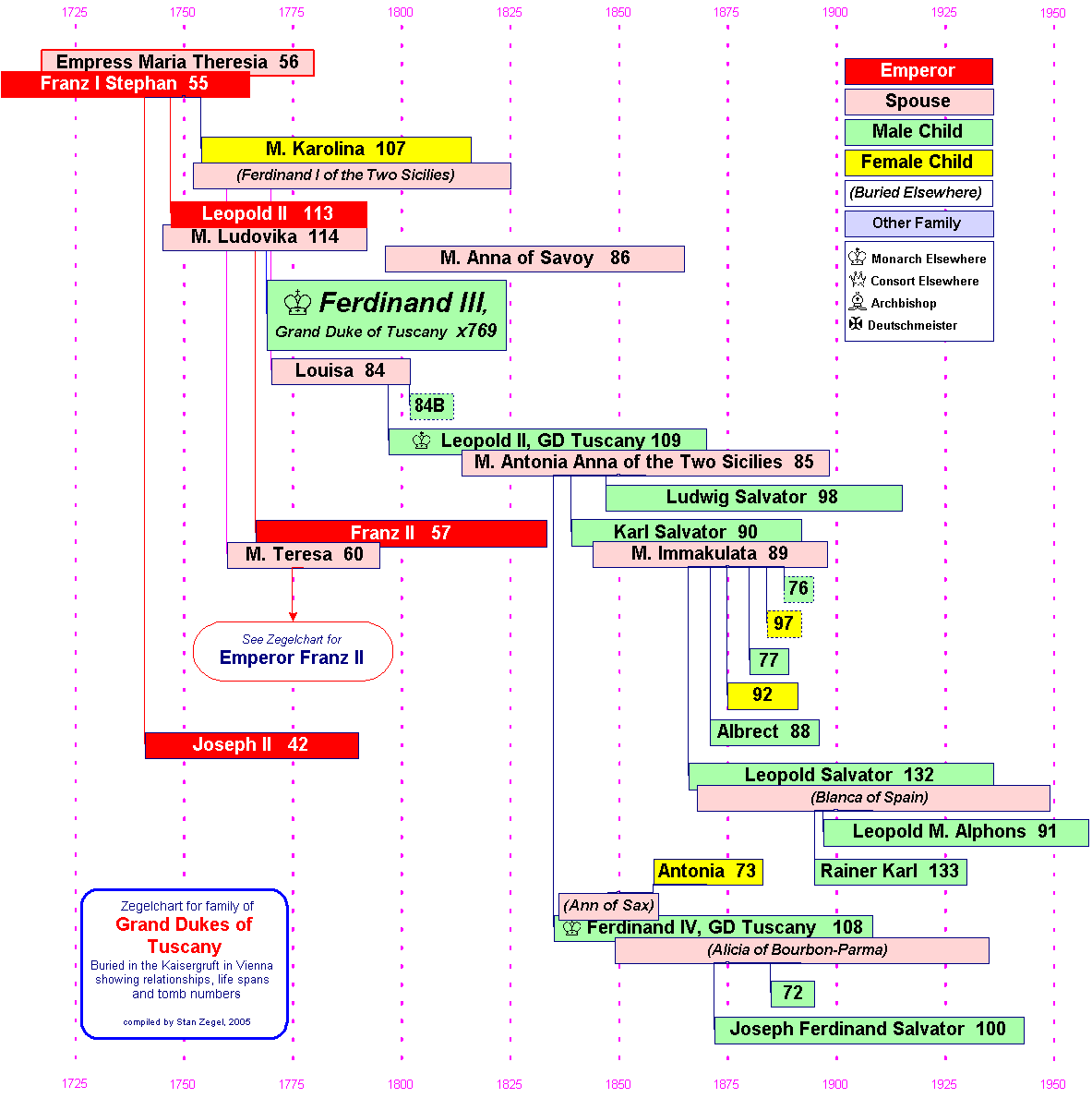

== See also ==
- Ducal Crypt, Vienna, for the traditional depository of the viscera of those entombed here
- Herzgruft, Vienna, for the traditional depository of the hearts of those entombed here
- Palatinal Crypt, for the burial place of the Hungarian Habsburgs in Buda Castle
- Mayerling incident
