= Archduchess Maria Antonietta of Austria =

Austrian archduchess (1858–1883)

Maria Antonietta
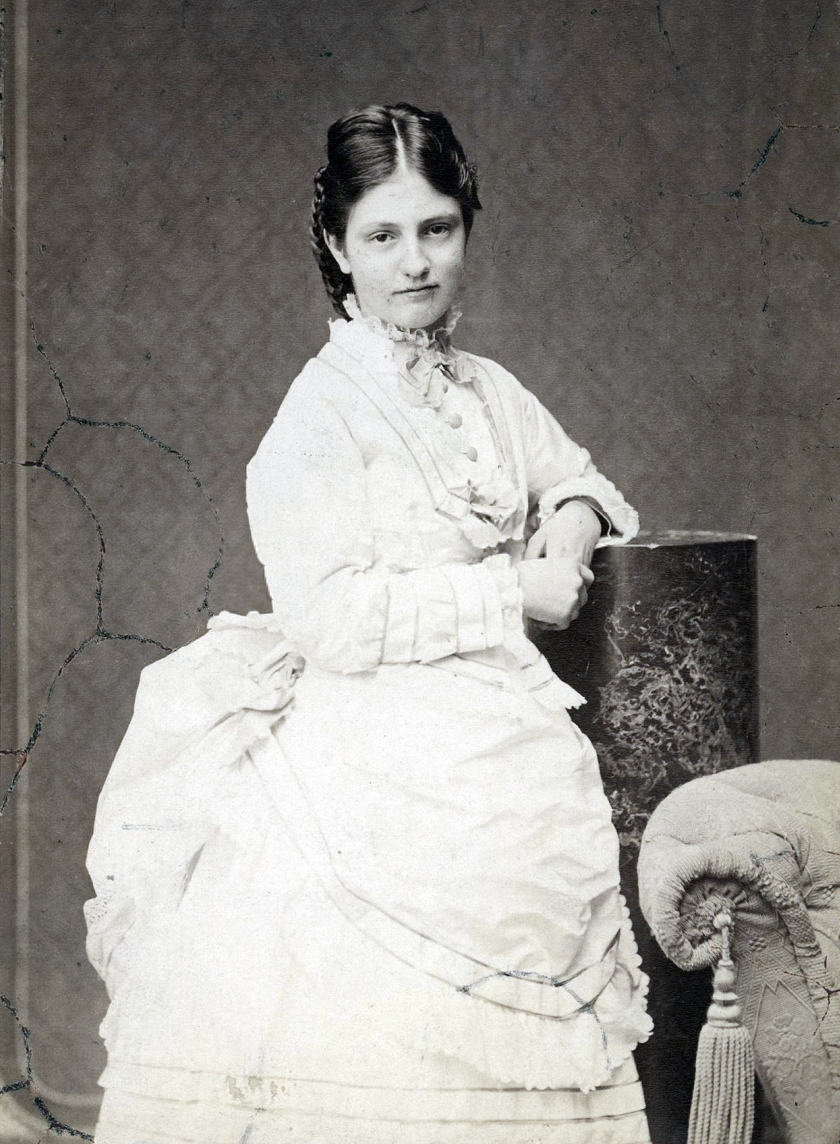
- Maria Antonietta in 1875

Princess-Abbess of the Imperial and Royal Theresian Institution of Noble Ladies
- Reign: 1881 – 1883
- Born: 10 January 1858; Florence, Grand Duchy of Tuscany
- Died: 13 April 1883 (aged 25); Cannes, Alpes-Maritimes; French Third Republic
Names
- Maria Antonietta Leopolda Annunziata Anna Amalia Giuseppa Giovanna Immacolata Tecla
- House: Habsburg-Lorraine
- Father: Ferdinand IV, Grand Duke of Tuscany
- Mother: Princess Anna of Saxony

Archduchess Maria Antonietta of Austria, Princess of Tuscany (Maria Antonietta Leopolda Annunziata Anna Amalia Giuseppa Giovanna Immacolata Tecla; 10 January 1858 – 13 April 1883) was a member of the House of Habsburg-Lorraine. She served as the Princess-Abbess of the Theresian Royal and Imperial Convent in Hradčany from 1881 until she died in 1883.

== Biography ==
Archduchess Maria Antonietta was born on 10 January 1858 in Florence as the first child of Ferdinand, Grand Prince of Tuscany, and the only child from his first marriage to Princess Anna of Saxony.

Her maternal grandparents were King John of Saxony and Princess Amalie Auguste of Bavaria, a daughter of King Maximilian I Joseph of Bavaria. Her mother died in 1859. Later that year, her father succeeded her grandfather, Leopold II, as the Grand Duke of Tuscany.

In 1860, the Grand Duchy of Tuscany was annexed into the Kingdom of Sardinia. After the annexation, her family moved to Salzburg. On 11 January 1868, her father married Princess Alice of Bourbon-Parma.

In 1881, Maria Antonietta was appointed by Franz Joseph I of Austria to serve as the Princess-Abbess of the Imperial and Royal Theresian Institution of Noble Ladies in Hradčany. She was also a 1st class Dame of the Order of the Starry Cross.

She was a writer and published works in German under the pseudonym Arno.

== Death ==
After years of declining health from tuberculosis, she moved to Cannes in November 1882 in search of a better climate, where she resided in Villa Félicie.

She died in Cannes on 13 April 1883, unmarried and without issue. She is buried alongside all other members of the House of Habsburg in the Imperial Crypt, Vienna.

== Ancestry ==
Ancestors of Archduchess Maria Antonietta of Austria

8. Ferdinand III of Tuscany
4. Leopold II of Tuscany
9. Louise of the Two Sicilies
2. Ferdinand IV of Tuscany
10. Francis I of the Two Sicilies
5. Maria Antonietta of the Two Sicilies
11. Maria Isabella of Spain
1. Maria Antonietta of Tuscany
12. Maximilian of Saxony
6. John of Saxony
13. Caroline of Parma
3. Anna of Saxony
14. Maximilian I of Bavaria
7. Amelia of Bavaria
15. Caroline of Baden
