= Theresian Institution of Noble Ladies =

Catholic chapter for noblewomen

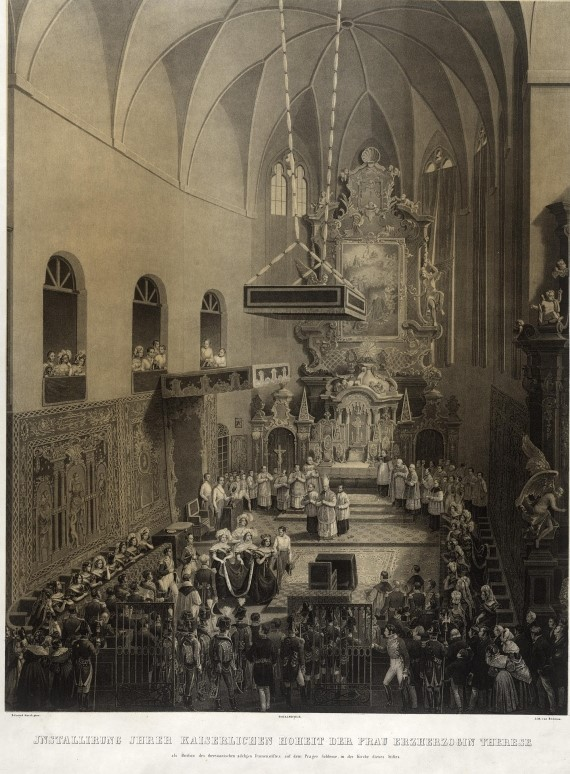
Installation of Archduchess Therese of Austria as Princess-Abbess in 1836

The Theresian Institution of Noble Ladies (Czech: Tereziánský ústav šlechtičen), officially the Imperial and Royal Theresian Stift for Noble Ladies in the Castle of Prague, was a Catholic monastic chapter of secular canonesses in Hradčany that admitted women from impoverished noble families from 1753 until 1918.

== History ==
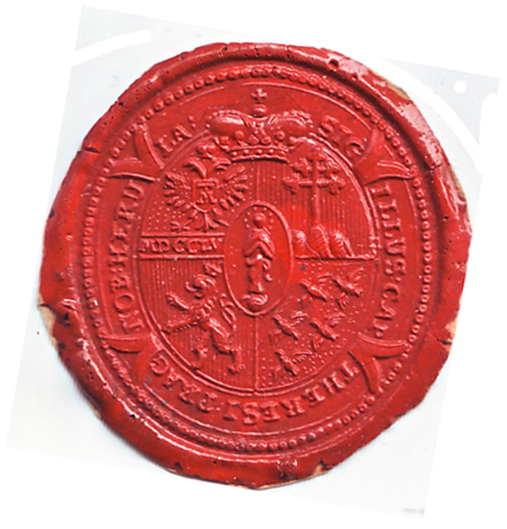
Original seal 1755, foundation of the Theresian Institute of Noblewomen in Prague by the Empress Maria Theresa

The Theresian Stift was founded in 1755 by Empress Maria Theresa in order to serve as a religious order for impoverished noblewomen. The Institute officially opened in 1755 and was housed in Prague Castle, enrolling thirty unmarried young women from Austrian and Hungarian aristocratic families who were financially strained. The noblewomen lived as secular canonesses and were not required to take vows of celibacy and were allowed to leave the chapter in order to marry.

The Institution was run by a princess-abbess, who was selected by the emperor. Each princess-abbess was, by birth, an Austrian archduchess from the House of Habsburg-Lorraine. With the closing of the neighbouring St. George's Convent in 1782, the princess-abbess of the Theresian Institution inherited the privilege of crowning the queens of Bohemia. Other administrative roles within the Institution included a dean, a sub-dean, and two canoness assistants.

The Institution closed in 1919 after the fall of the Austro-Hungarian Empire and the creation of the Republic of Czechoslovakia.

== Princess-Abbesses ==
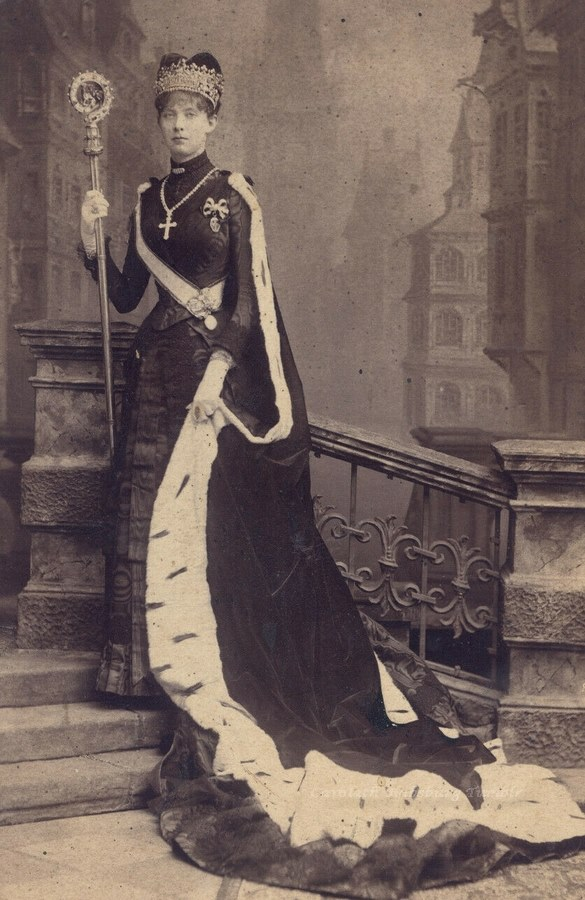
Archduchess Margaretha as Princess-Abbess (1890)

Notable Princess-Abbesses of the Institution include:

- Archduchess Maria Anna of Austria (1766–1789)
- Archduchess Maria Anna of Austria (1791–1800)
- Archduchess Maria Theresa of Austria (1834–1835)
- Archduchess Hermine of Austria (1837–1842)
- Archduchess Maria Karoline of Austria (1844–1852)
- Archduchess Maria Christina of Austria (1875–1879)
- Archduchess Maria Antonietta of Austria (1881–1883)
- Archduchess Margarete Sophie of Austria (1886–1893)
- Archduchess Karoline Marie of Austria (1893–1894)
- Archduchess Maria Annunciata of Austria (1894–1919)

== Notable alumnae ==
- Baroness Mary von Vetsera (1871–1889), mistress of Rudolf, Crown Prince of Austria
