= Princess Anna of Saxony (1836–1859) =

Anna Maria
- Archduchess of Austria, Princess of Hungary, Croatia and Bohemia; Grand Princess of Tuscany
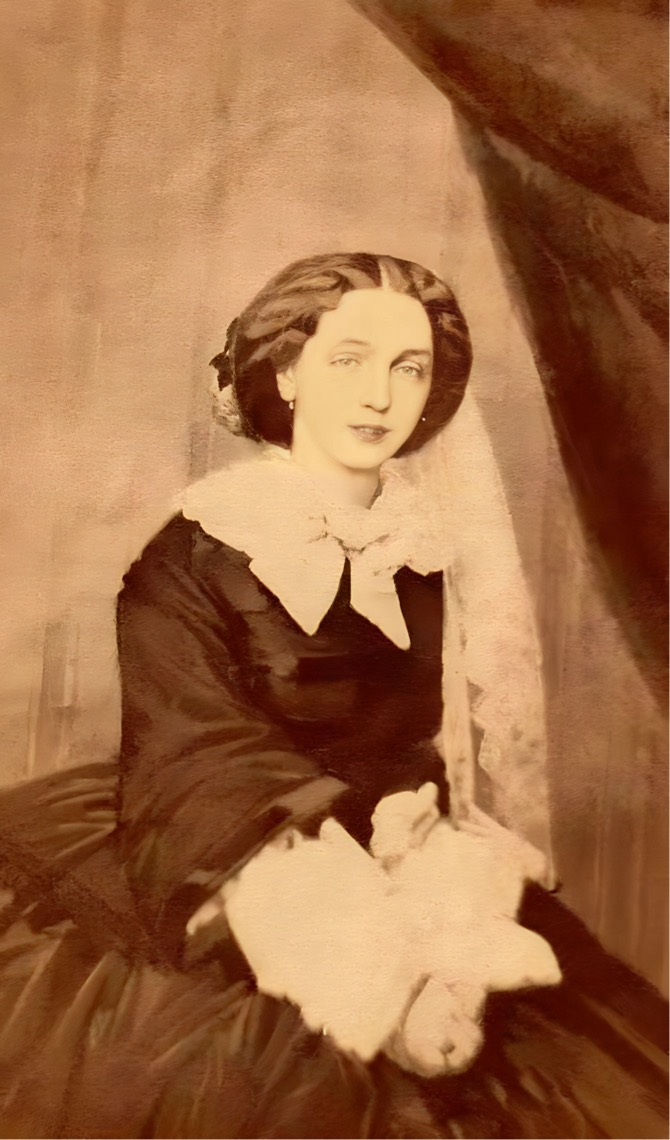
- Photograph c. 1858
- Born: 4 January 1836; Dresden, Kingdom of Saxony
- Died: 10 February 1859 (aged 23); Naples, Kingdom of the Two Sicilies
- Burial: Basilica of San Lorenzo, Florence (body); Basilica of Santa Chiara, Naples (heart)
- Spouse: Archduke Ferdinand, Grand Prince of Tuscany (m. 1856)
- Issue: Archduchess Maria Antonia
Names
- German: Anna Maria Maximiliana Stephania Karoline Johanna Ludovika Xaveria Nepomucena Aloysia Benedikta
- House: Wettin
- Father: John of Saxony
- Mother: Amalie Auguste of Bavaria

Princess Anna Maria of Saxony (Full German name: Prinzessin Anna Maria Maximiliane Stephania Karoline Johanna Luisa Xaveria Nepomucena Aloysia Benedicta von Sachsen, Herzogin zu Sachsen; 4 January 1836 – 10 February 1859) was a princess of Saxony by virtue of birth and Archduchess of Austria and Princess of Tuscany by virtue of marriage.

== Early life and ancestry ==
Anna was the daughter of John of Saxony and Amalie Auguste of Bavaria. She was born 4 January 1836 in Dresden, Kingdom of Saxony, and died 10 February 1859 in Naples.

Anna Maria was her parents' seventh child and fourth eldest daughter, and a younger sister of Albert of Saxony and George of Saxony. Through her marriage to Archduke Ferdinand, Grand Prince of Tuscany in 1856, Anna Maria became a member of the House of Habsburg-Lorraine and an Archduchess and Princess of Austria as well as a Princess of Hungary, Croatia, Bohemia, and Tuscany.

She died shortly before her husband succeeded his father as Grand Duke of Tuscany.

== Marriage and issue ==
Anna married the future Ferdinand IV, Grand Duke of Tuscany, eldest son of Leopold II, Grand Duke of Tuscany by his first wife, Princess Maria Antonia of the Two Sicilies, on 24 November 1856 in Dresden. She was his first wife.

Anna and Ferdinand had two children:

- Archduchess Maria Antonietta Leopolda Annunziata Anna Amalia Giuseppa Giovanna Immacolata Tecla (in German Maria Antonia Leopoldine Annunziata Anna Amalia Josepha Johanna Immaculata Thekla) (Florence, 10 January 1858 – Cannes, 13 April 1883)
- Stillborn daughter (born and died 1859)

== Death ==
In early 1859, while visiting Naples, Princess Anna Maria contracted typhoid fever. The illness led to a miscarriage on 6 February 1859, and she died four days later on 10 February at the age of 23.

Due to the timing of her death, she never became the Grand Duchess consort, as her husband Ferdinand succeeded his father as Ferdinand IV just months later in July 1859.

== Ancestry ==
Ancestors of Princess Anna of Saxony (1836–1859)

8. Frederick Christian, Elector of Saxony
4. Maximilian, Hereditary Prince of Saxony
9. Duchess Maria Antonia of Bavaria
2. John of Saxony
10. Ferdinand, Duke of Parma
5. Princess Carolina of Parma
11. Archduchess Maria Amalia of Austria
1. Princess Anna of Saxony
12. Frederick Michael, Count Palatine of Zweibrücken
6. Maximilian I Joseph of Bavaria
13. Countess Palatine Maria Franziska of Sulzbach
3. Princess Amalie Auguste of Bavaria
14. Charles Louis, Hereditary Prince of Baden
7. Princess Caroline of Baden
15. Princess Amalie of Hesse-Darmstadt
