= Archduchess Maria Josepha of Austria (1687–1703) =

Austrian archduchess

Maria Josepha of Austria
- 1703 engraving
- Born: 6 March 1687; Vienna, Archduchy of Austria, Holy Roman Empire
- Died: 14 April 1703 (aged 16); Vienna, Archduchy of Austria, Holy Roman Empire
- Burial: Imperial Crypt, Vienna (body); Herzgruft, Vienna (heart)
- Father: Leopold I, Holy Roman Emperor
- Mother: Eleonore Magdalene of the Palatinate

Maria Josepha of Austria (Maria Josepha Colletta Antonia; 6 March 1687 – 14 April 1703) was the penultimate child of Leopold I, Holy Roman Emperor and his third wife, Princess Eleonore Magdalene of Pfalz-Neuburg.

== Biography ==
Born at the Hofburg palace in Vienna, Archduchy of Austria, as a member of the reigning House of Habsburg, she was the fifth daughter of Leopold I, Holy Roman Emperor and his third wife, Princess Eleonore Magdalene of Pfalz-Neuburg.

Two of her siblings became Holy Roman Emperors, Joseph I and Charles VI, and her elder sister, Maria Anna, became the Queen of Portugal, while her other sisters Maria Elisabeth and Maria Magdalena became Governors of the Austrian Netherlands and County of Tyrol respectively.

== Death ==
On 14 April 1703, Maria Josepha died of smallpox at the age of sixteen, and was buried in the Imperial Crypt, while her heart was placed in the Herzgruft at the Augustinian Church, Vienna.

== Ancestors ==
Ancestors of Archduchess Maria Josepha of Austria (1687–1703)

8. Ferdinand II, Holy Roman Emperor
4. Ferdinand III, Holy Roman Emperor
9. Maria Anna of Bavaria
2. Leopold I, Holy Roman Emperor
10. Philip III of Spain
5. Maria Anna of Austria
11. Margaret of Austria
1. Maria Josepha of Austria
12. Wolfgang William, Count Palatine of Neuburg
6. Philip William, Elector Palatine
13. Magdalene of Bavaria
3. Eleonore Magdalena of the Palatinate
14. George II, Landgrave of Hesse-Darmstadt
7. Elisabeth Amalie of Hesse-Darmstadt
15. Sophia Eleonore of Saxony
