= Herzgruft =

Burial chamber containing hearts of members of House of Habsburg

Coordinates: 48°12′20.6″N 16°22′2″E

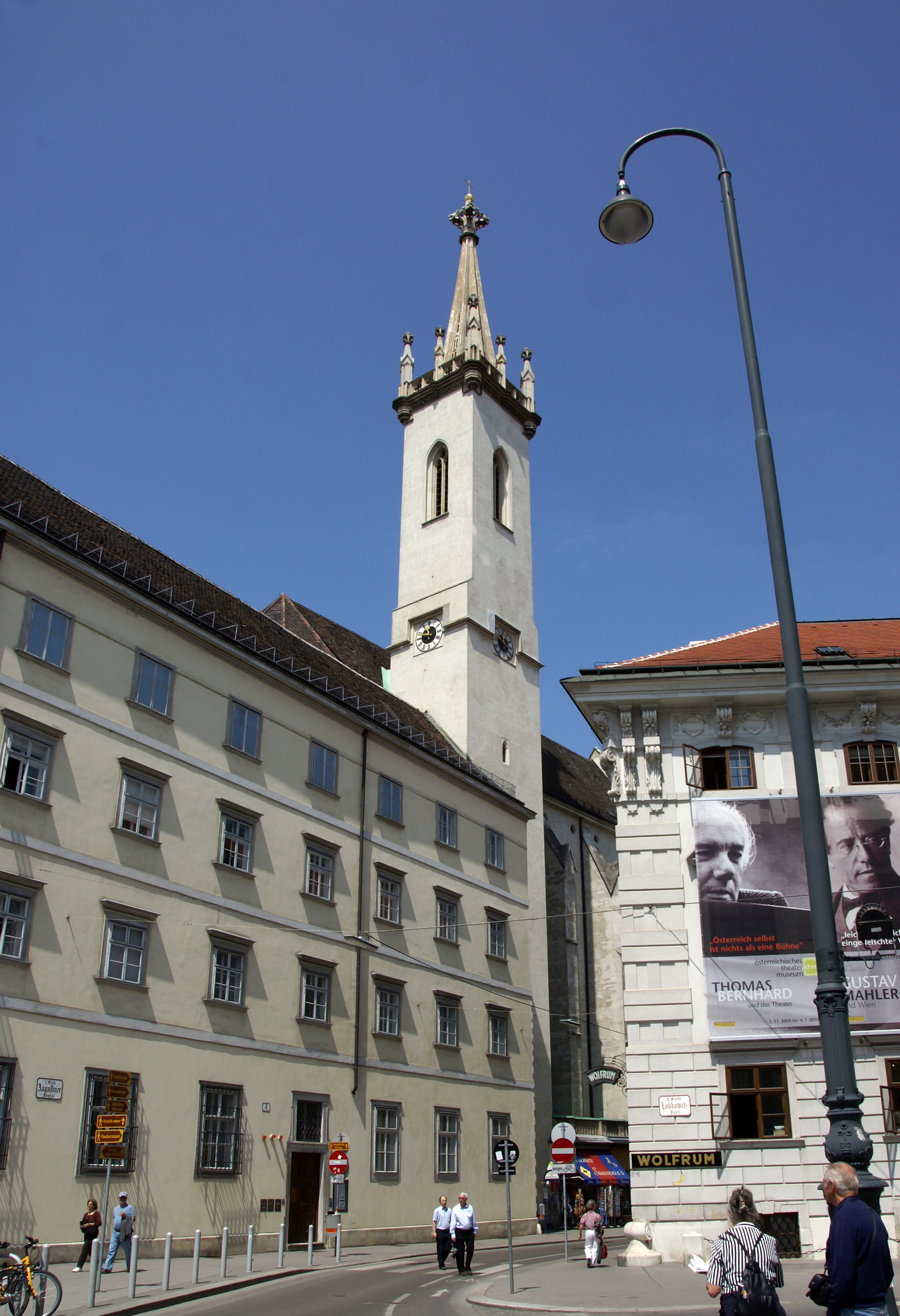
Augustinian Church in Vienna, which houses the Herzgruft

The Herzgruft (German for 'Heart Crypt') is a burial chamber that protects 54 urns containing the hearts of members of the House of Habsburg. The crypt is located behind the Loreto Chapel in the Augustinian Church within the Hofburg Palace complex in Vienna, Austria.

The first heart, belonging to King Ferdinand IV, was placed in the Augustinian Church on 10 July 1654, according to his wishes. The last heart, belonging to Archduke Franz Karl of Austria, was placed in the crypt on 8 March 1878. The bodies of all but three of the hearts are in the Imperial Crypt a few blocks away.

== History ==
King Ferdinand IV instructed that his heart would be interred at the foot of the Holy Mother in the Augustinian Church in Vienna. Following the death of the king on 9 July 1654, the corpse was embalmed and the heart was placed in a goblet and displayed on the death bed. The next day, around 9:00 pm, the heart was transferred to the Loreto Chapel and buried at the foot of the Madonna in a simple celebration. With this simple act of piety, a custom was started to bury the hearts of all members of the House of Habsburg in the crypt alongside the heart of King Ferdinand IV. By 1878, 54 hearts had been brought to this simple crypt.

== Crypt ==
=== Upper row ===
In the upper row, arranged in sequence of death date (from left to right):

- 1 Empress Anna of Tyrol (4 October 1585 – 15 December 1618) →Family Tree
  Daughter of Ferdinand II, Duke of Tyrol and wife of her cousin Emperor Matthias._{2} Buried in tomb 1 in the Imperial Crypt.
- 2 Emperor Matthias (1557–1619) →Family Tree
  Third son of Emperor Maximilian II. Husband of Empress Anna._{1} Buried in tomb 2 in the Imperial Crypt.
- 3 Emperor Ferdinand II (1578–1637) →Family Tree
  Eldest son of Archduke Charles II of Styria. Buried in the Grazer Dom, Graz.
- 4 King Ferdinand IV of the Romans (8 September 1633 – 9 July 1654) →Family Tree
  Eldest son of Emperor Ferdinand III. Founder of this Herzgruft. Buried in tomb 29 in the Imperial Crypt.
- 5 Archduke Leopold Wilhelm (6 April 1614 – 20 November 1662) →Family Tree
  Son of Emperor Ferdinand II._{3} Named at age 13 to take over his uncle Leopold's renounced see of Halberstaedt (when he became 22, this was confirmed by the Pope) and later became also Bishop of Olomouc, Bishop of Breslau, and Grand Master of the Teutonic Knights. Buried in tomb 115 in the Imperial Crypt.
- 6 Empress Margarita Teresa (12 August 1651 – 12 March 1673) →Family Tree
  Niece, cousine and first wife of Emperor Leopold I_{11} at age 15. Buried in tomb 20 in the Imperial Crypt.
- 7 Empress Eleonora Magdalena of Mantua-Nevers-Gonzaga (18 November 1630 – 6 December 1686) →Family Tree
  Third wife of Emperor Ferdinand III. Foundress of the Order of the Starry Cross (the Sternkreuzorden). Buried in tomb 19 in the Imperial Crypt.
- 8 Archduchess Maria Antonia (18 January 1669 – 24 December 1692) →Family Tree
  Daughter of Emperor Leopold I_{11} and wife of Maximilian II Emanuel, Elector of Bavaria. Buried in tomb 28 in the Imperial Crypt.
- 9 Archduchess Maria Theresia (1684–1696) →Family Tree
  Twelve-year-old daughter of Emperor Leopold I._{11} Buried in tomb 25 of the Imperial Crypt.
- 10 Archduchess Maria Josepha (1687–1703) →Family Tree
  Daughter of Emperor Leopold I._{11} Buried in tomb 16 in the Imperial Crypt.
- 11 Emperor Leopold I (9 June 1640 – 5 May 1705) →Family Tree
  Second son of Emperor Ferdinand III and father of Emperors Joseph I_{12} and Karl IV._{13} Buried in tomb 37 in the Imperial Crypt.
- 12 Emperor Joseph I (1678–1711) →Family Tree
  Son of Emperor Leopold I._{11} Buried in tomb 35 in the Imperial Crypt.
- 13 Emperor Karl VI (1 October 1685 – 20 October 1740) →Family Tree
  Younger son of Emperor Leopold I._{11} Buried in tomb 40 in the Imperial Crypt.
- 14 Archduchess Maria Elisabeth (1680–1741) →Family Tree
  Daughter of Emperor Leopold I._{11} Buried in tomb 38 in the Imperial Crypt.
- 15 Archduchess Maria Anna (14 September 1718 – 16 December 1744) →Family Tree
  Daughter of Emperor Karl VI._{13} and sister of Empress Maria Theresia._{21} Buried in tomb 39 in the Imperial Crypt.
- 16 Unnamed princess (1744) →Family Tree
  Daughter of Prince Charles of Lorraine and Archduchess Maria Anna._{15} Buried in tomb 47 in the Imperial Crypt.
- 17 Empress Elisabeth Christine of Brunswick-Wolfenbüttel (28 August 1691 – 21 December 1750) →Family Tree
  Wife (1708) of Emperor Karl VI_{13} and mother of Empress Maria Theresa._{21} Buried in tomb 36 in the Imperial Crypt.
- 18 Archduke Karl Joseph Emanuel Johann Nepomuk Anton Prokop (1 February 1745 – 18 January 1761) →Family Tree
  Second son of Emperor Franz I Stephen_{20} and Empress Maria Theresa._{21} Buried in tomb 44 in the Imperial Crypt.
- 19 Archduchess Maria Johanna Gabriela Josephe Antonie (4 February 1750 – 23 December 1762 →Family Tree
  Eighth daughter of Emperor Franz I Stephen_{20} and Empress Maria Theresa._{21} Buried in tomb 45 in the Imperial Crypt.
- 20 Emperor Franz I Stephen (Lunéville 8 December 1708 – Innsbruck 18 August 1765) →Family Tree
  Duke of Lorraine and Grand Duke of Tuscany. Husband of Empress Maria Theresa,_{21} Buried in tomb 55 in the Imperial Crypt.
- 21 Empress Maria Theresa (13 May 1717 – 29 November 1780) →Family Tree
  Eldest surviving descendant of Emperor Karl VI,_{13}→Family Tree her ascension was contested and officially the crown of the Empire went to her husband (1736) Emperor Franz I Stephen._{20} Buried in tomb 56 in the Imperial Crypt.
- 22 Archduchess Louise Elisabeth (Vienna 18 February 1790 – Vienna 24 June 1791) →Family Tree
  Infant first daughter of Emperor Franz II_{43} and Empress Maria Theresia Caroline._{35} Buried in tomb 66 in the Imperial Crypt.
- 23 Emperor Leopold II (1747–1792) →Family Tree
  Third son of Empress Maria Theresia._{21} →Family Tree Buried in tomb 113 in the Imperial Crypt.
- 24 Empress Maria Ludovika (24 November 1745 – 15 May 1792) →Family Tree
  Wife of Emperor Leopold II_{23} and mother of Emperor Franz II_{43}. Buried in tomb 114 in the Imperial Crypt.
- 25 Archduchess Maria Karoline Leopoldine Franziska Theresia Josepha Medarde (Vienna 8 June 1794 – Vienna 16 March 1795) →Family Tree
  Daughter of Emperor Franz II_{43} and Maria Theresia Caroline._{35} Buried in tomb 95 in the Imperial Crypt.
- 26 Archduke Alexander Leopold Johann Joseph, Palatine of Hungary (Poggio Imperiale 14 August 1772 – Laxenburg 12 July 1795) →Family Tree
  Fourth son of Emperor Leopold II_{23} and Empress Maria Ludovika._{24} Buried in tomb 64 in the Imperial Crypt.
- 27 Archduchess Maria Amalia Josephe Johanna Katharina Theresia (Florence 15 October 1780 – Vienna 25 December 1798) →Family Tree
  Daughter of Emperor Leopold II_{23} and Empress Maria Ludovika._{24} Buried in tomb 65 in the Imperial Crypt.
- 28 Archduchess Maria Christina Johanna Josephe Antonie ("Mimi") (3 May 1742 – 24 June 1798) →Family Tree
  Favorite daughter of Empress Maria Theresia._{21} and wife of Duke Albert of Teschen._{40} The famous and moving monument he erected to her memory is in the nave of this Augustinerkirche church. Buried in tomb 112 in the Imperial Crypt.
- 29 Archduchess Caroline Ludovika Leopoldine (Vienna 9 December 1795 – Schloß Hetzendorf 30 June 1799) →Family Tree
  Fourth daughter of Emperor Franz II_{43} and Maria Theresia._{35} Buried in tomb 87 in the Imperial Crypt.
- 30 Archduke Maximilian Franz (8 December 1756 – 26 July 1801) →Family Tree
  Youngest son of Empress Maria Theresia._{21} Archbishop of Cologne. Buried in tomb 118 in the Imperial Crypt.
- 31 Archduchess Karoline Ferdinanda (1793–1802) →Family Tree
  Daughter of Emperor Franz II_{43} and Maria Theresia._{35} Buried in tomb 79 in the Imperial Crypt.
- 32 Grand Duchess Luisa Maria Amelia Teresa of Naples and Sicily (Naples 27 July 1773 – Vienna 19 September 1802) →Family Tree
  Daughter of Queen Maria Karolina of Naples and Sicily._{38} First wife (1790) of Ferdinand III, Grand Duke of Tuscany. →Family Tree Buried in tomb 84 in the Imperial Crypt.

=== Lower row ===
In the lower row, arranged in sequence of death date (from left to right):

- 33 Marie Amalie Josepha Johanna Antonie (Vienna 26 February 1746 – Prague 18 June 1804)
  Daughter of Empress Maria Theresia._{21} Buried in St. Vitus Cathedral in Prague.
- 34 Archduke Ferdinand Karl Anton Joseph Johann Stanislaus (1 June 1754 – 24 December 1806) →Family Tree
  Fourth son of Empress Maria Theresia._{21} Buried in tomb 105 in the Imperial Crypt.
- 35 Empress Maria Teresa of Naples and Sicily (Naples 6 June 1772 – Vienna 13 April 1807) →Family Tree
  Second wife (1790) at age 18 of Emperor Franz II._{43} Buried in tomb 60 in the Imperial Crypt.
- 36 Archduke Joseph Franz Leopold (Vienna 9 April 1799 – Laxenburg 30 June 1807) →Family Tree
  Second son of Emperor Franz II_{43} and Empress Maria Theresia Carolina._{35} Buried in tomb 69 in the Imperial Crypt.
- 37 Archduke Johann Nepomuk Karl (Vienna 29 August 1805 – Vienna 19 February 1809) →Family Tree
  Fourth son of Emperor Franz II_{43} and Empress Maria Theresia Carolina._{35} Buried in tomb 71 in the Imperial Crypt.
- 38 Queen Maria Carolina of Naples and Sicily 1752 – 1814) →Family Tree
  Daughter of Empress Maria Theresia._{21} Buried in tomb 107 in the Imperial Crypt.
- 39 Empress Archduchess Maria Ludowika of Austria-Este (Monza 14 December 1787 – Verona 7 April 1816) →Family Tree
  Third wife (1808) at age 20 of 40-year-old cousin Emperor Franz II._{43} Buried in tomb 58 in the Imperial Crypt.
- 40 Duke Albert of Saxony-Teschen (11 July 1738 – 10 February 1822) →Family Tree
  Husband of Archduchess Maria Christina._{28} Buried in tomb 111 in the Imperial Crypt.
- 41 Archduke Rudolph Franz (1822–1822) →Family Tree
  Infant son of Archduke Karl._{45} Buried in tomb 125 in the Imperial Crypt.
- 42 Prince Napoleon II of France (1811–1832) →Family Tree
  Son of Napoleon of France and Empress Maria Louise (daughter of Emperor Franz II._{43}) Buried in Les Invalides in Paris.
- 43 Emperor Franz II (Florence 12 February 1768 – Vienna 2 March 1835) →Family Tree
  Eldest son of Emperor Leopold II._{23} →Family Tree Buried in tomb 57 in the Imperial Crypt.
- 44 Archduke Anton Viktor (31 August 1779 – 2 April 1835) →Family Tree
  Eighth son of Emperor Leopold II._{23} Last Grand Master of the Order of Teutonic Knights before Napoleon suppressed it outside of the Habsburg lands. Buried in tomb 103 in the Imperial Crypt.
- 45 Archduke Karl "the victor of Aspern" (1771–1847) →Family Tree
  Duke of Teschen, third son of Emperor Leopold II._{23} Adopted son of his aunt Archduchess Maria Christina._{28} and Albert of Saxony-Teschen_{40}. Buried in tomb 122 of the Imperial Crypt.
- 46 Archduke Ferdinand Karl Joseph of Austria-Este (1781–1850) →Family Tree
  Son of Archduke Ferdinand Karl Anton._{34} Buried in tomb 102 in the Imperial Crypt.
- 47 Archduke Franz Joseph of Austria-Teschen (Groß-Seelowitz 5 March 1855 – Groß-Seelowitz 13 March 1855) →Family Tree
  Infant first son of Archduke Karl Ferdinand. Buried in tomb 68 in the Imperial Crypt.
- 48 Archduchess Marie Anne (Vienna 8 June 1804 – Baden bei Wien 28 December 1858) →Family Tree
  Unmarried 54-year-old daughter of Emperor Franz II_{43} and Maria Theresia Carolina._{36} Buried in tomb 82 in the Imperial Crypt.
- 49 Archduchess Hildegard of Bavaria (10 June 1825 – 2 April 1864) →Family Tree
  Wife of Archduke Albrecht. Buried in tomb 129 in the Imperial Crypt.
- 50 Archduke Ludwig Joseph (13 December 1784 – 21 December 1864) →Family Tree
  Eleventh son of Emperor Leopold II._{23} Buried in tomb 104 in the Imperial Crypt.
- 51 Grand Duchess Maria Anna of Saxony (Dresden 27 April 1796 – Schloß Brandeis, Bohemia 3 January 1865) →Family Tree
  Second wife (1821) of Ferdinand III, Grand Duke of Tuscany. Buried in tomb 86 in the Imperial Crypt.
- 52 Archduchess Mathilde of Austria-Teschen (25 January 1849 – 6 June 1867) →Family Tree
  Daughter of Archduke Albrecht. Buried in tomb 130 in the Imperial Crypt.
- 53 Emperor Ferdinand I of Austria (1793–1875) →Family Tree
  Son of Emperor Franz II._{43} Buried in tomb 62 in the Imperial Crypt.
- 54 Archduke Franz Karl (1802–1878) →Family Tree
  Third son of Emperor Franz II._{43} and father of Emperor Franz Josef. Buried in tomb 135 in the Imperial Crypt.

== See also ==
- Ducal Crypt
- Heart-burial
- Imperial Crypt
