= Eleonore Magdalene of Neuburg =

Holy Roman Empress from 1676 to 1705

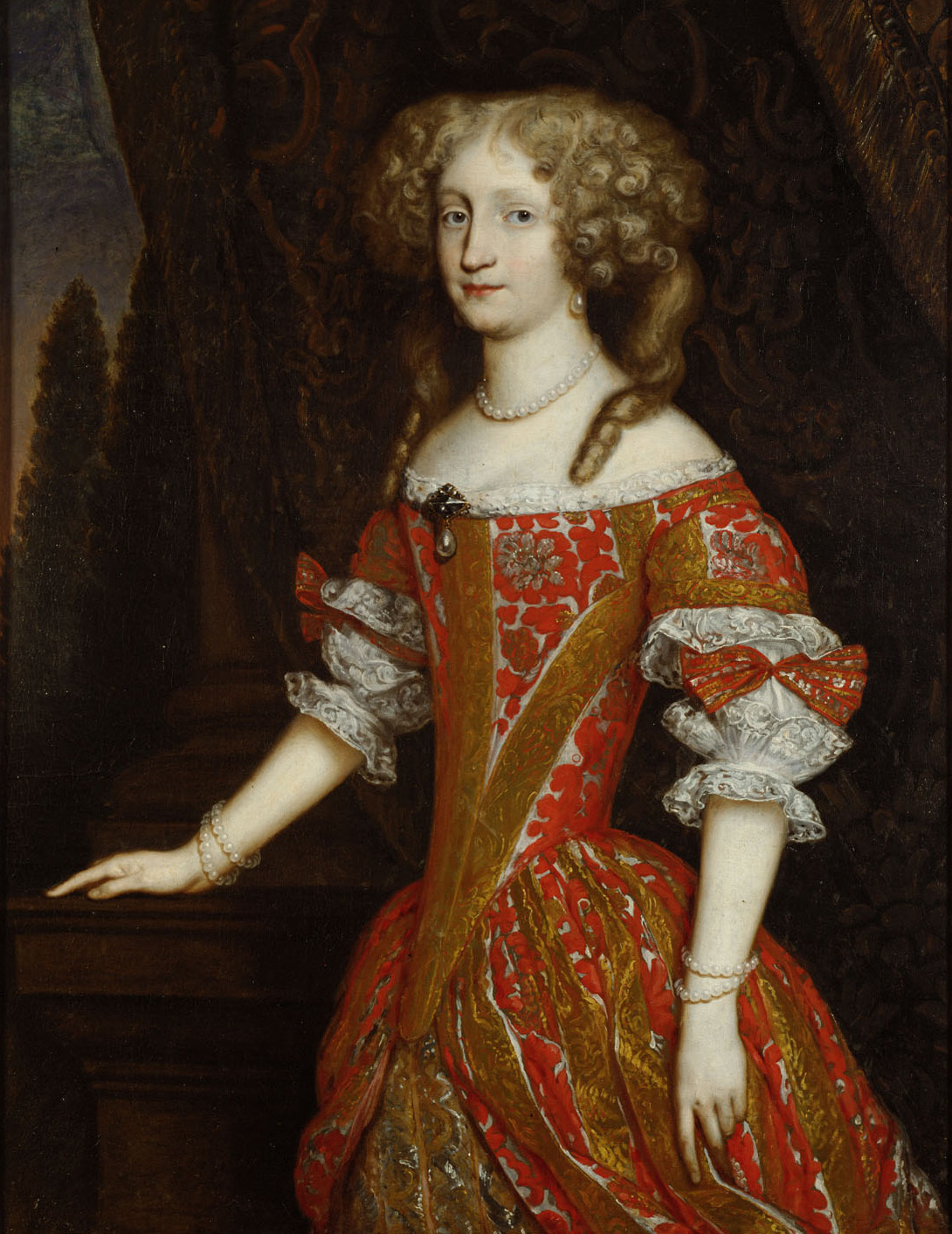
- Portrait by an unknown artist, c. 1680

Holy Roman Empress
- Tenure: 14 December 1676 – 5 May 1705
- Coronation: 19 January 1690
- Born: 6 January 1655; Düsseldorf, Electoral Palatinate, Holy Roman Empire
- Died: 19 January 1720 (aged 65); Hofburg Palace, Vienna, Archduchy of Austria, Holy Roman Empire
- Burial: Herzgruft (heart); Imperial Crypt (body)
- Spouse: Leopold I, Holy Roman Emperor (m. 1676; died 1705)
- Issue: Joseph I, Holy Roman Emperor; Maria Elisabeth, Governor of the Austrian Netherlands; Maria Anna, Queen of Portugal; Archduchess Maria Theresa; Charles VI, Holy Roman Emperor; Archduchess Maria Josepha; Archduchess Maria Magdalena
Names
- Eleonore Magdalene Therese
- House: Wittelsbach
- Father: Philip William, Elector Palatine
- Mother: Elisabeth Amalie of Hesse-Darmstadt

Eleonore Magdalene of Neuburg (Eleonore Magdalene Therese; 6 January 1655 – 19 January 1720) was Holy Roman Empress, German Queen, Archduchess of Austria, Queen of Hungary and Bohemia as the third and final wife of Leopold I, Holy Roman Emperor. Before her marriage and during her widowhood, she led an ascetic and monastic life, translating the Bible from Latin to German and defended the Order of the Discalced Carmelites. Reputed to be one of the most educated and virtuous women of her time, Eleonore took part in the political affairs during the reign of her husband and sons, especially regarding court revenue and foreign relationships. She served as regent for a few months in 1711, period in which she signed the Treaty of Szatmár, which recognized the rights of her descendants to the Hungarian throne.

== Childhood ==
Eleonore was born in Düsseldorf, Holy Roman Empire, on the night of 6 January 1655. She was the oldest of 17 children born from Philip William, Count Palatine of Neuburg and Duke of Jülich-Berg and his second wife, Landgravine Elisabeth Amalie of Hesse-Darmstadt. On her father's side her grandparents were Wolfgang Wilhelm, Count Palatine of Neuburg and his first wife, Magdalene of Bavaria. On her mother's side, her grandparents were George II, Landgrave of Hesse-Darmstadt and Sophia Eleonore of Saxony.

Immediately after birth, she was baptized Eleonore Magdalene Therese by the abbot of Altenburg Abbey. To celebrate her birth, the court chaplain and poet Jesuit Jakob Balde composed a Latin poem in hexameters called the "Song of Eleonore's Nativity" (Latin: Eleonorae Geniale carmen), which he partially translated into German in subsequent poems dedicated to her. He subsequently became her spiritual mentor until his death. In August, her parents moved with her from Düsseldorf to Neuburg. On 11 September 1661 at the Neuburg Hofkirche, she was anointed by Marquard II Schenk von Castell, Prince-bishop of Eichstätt.

Eleonore was raised in a pious environment and received an excellent education. She was well versed in finances, literature, theology, and became fluent in Latin, German, French and Italian. She was fond of the arts and hunting, though her true passion was reading and translating religious texts to German. Since September 1672, she lived at Schloss Benrath, where she began her training in etiquette under the guidance of a maid of honour.

From her early childhood, Eleonore displayed a pious nature and a fervent adherence to Catholicism. At the age of four years old, she saw a very explicit Crucifixion scene and burst into tears in sympathy with Jesus. Since then, she participated in religious activities and visited the poor, weak, needy and sick every day. These events influenced her depression which soon turned into self-destructive behaviour. She was drawn to the penitential side of Catholicism: as an example, she used bracelets with small spikes on the inside to torment the flesh. When court protocol demanded her to visit the opera, she reportedly took a prayer book with her to distract her from the play. However, Eleonore's beliefs had a positive side too. Among the poor, she asked them to treat her as a commoner rather than a person of noble birth, because she believed that all people were equally precious to God.

== Engagements ==
Order of the Discalced Carmelites, which young Eleonore wanted to join

On 2 February 1669, Eleonore entered the Brotherhood of Our Lady of Sorrows at the Cross. The special protection she provided to the Discalced Carmelites monasteries in Düsseldorf and Neuburg reflected her wish to be a Carmelite nun, but her parents refused to give their consent. Five royals asked for her hand and all were refused by Eleonore. One of her rejected suitors was the widower James, Duke of York, the future King of England and Scotland, who proposed in 1671.

In April 1676, Leopold I, Holy Roman Emperor lost his second wife and almost immediately began to search for a new one, urged by the need of a male heir. From his previous marriages he had six children, but all except the oldest daughter, Archduchess Maria Antonia, died shortly after birth. This time, Eleonore was chosen over Duchess Maria Anna Victoria of Bavaria (later Dauphine of France), Princess Ulrika Eleonora of Denmark (later Queen consort of Sweden), and many other potential candidates. Thanks to the intense diplomatic efforts of Eleonore's father, he gained to his side Francesco Bonvisi, Papal nuncio in Vienna, and King Charles II of Spain. The opponents of the Count Palatine of Neuburg in the Imperial court spread rumours that she suffered from poor health and was physically unattractive. However, these rumours didn't stop the emperor, who needed an heir and knew about her family's reputed fertility. In addition, the Count Palatine showed Leopold I a portrait of his daughter, made especially for this purpose.

The marriage negotiations began in April 1676. To this end, an emissary send by the Count Palatine arrived to Vienna managed to win the support of Empress Dowager Eleonora Gonzaga, Leopold I's beloved stepmother, and a number of notable courtiers, including Chancellor Johann Paul Freiherr von Hocher. In August 1676, the emperor's personal physician arrived in Neuburg and examined Eleonore. Back in Vienna the following month, he gave the official conclusion that she was healthy, but the death of Anna de' Medici, mother of his late second wife, forced the emperor to suspend the negotiations. Leopold I took the final decision about the marriage only in the second half of October. For Eleonore, the news that she would become the new empress didn't make her happy as she had still wished to become a nun; but in the end, she had no choice but to accept the will of her parents.

On 25 November 1676, the official betrothal took place. The bride, age 21, and groom, age 36, were second cousins (being both great-grandchildren of William V, Duke of Bavaria), and thus a papal dispensation was granted by Pope Innocent XI to allow the marriage. Eleonore's dowry was fixed at 100,000 florins. The first meeting between Leopold I and Eleonore took place two days before the wedding, but the two made a favourable impression on each other.

== Holy Roman Empress and German Queen ==
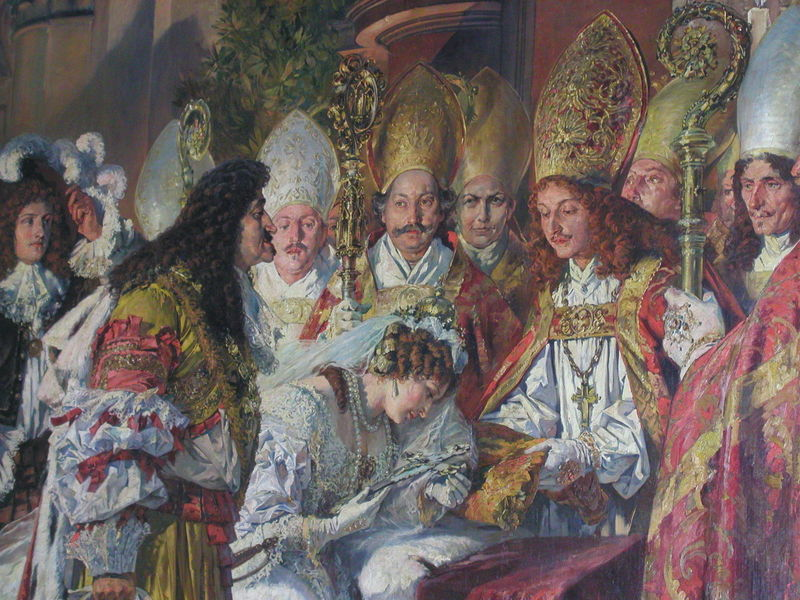
Painting depicting the 1676 marriage of Empress Eleonore and Emperor Leopold

The wedding took place in Passau on 14 December 1676. Although it was somewhat private as foreign ambassadors weren't invited, the ceremony was elaborate and celebrations lasted several days. As a wedding gift from the groom, the bride received the famous Wittelsbach Diamond. On 7 January 1677, the Imperial couple arrived in Vienna.

Eleonore soon proved her fertility by becoming pregnant with her first child within months. In total, she gave birth to ten children, of whom six survived to adulthood:

- Joseph Jakob Ignaz Johann Anton Eustachius (26 July 1678 – 17 April 1711), who became the successor of his father as Joseph I, Holy Roman Emperor.
- Maria Christina Josepha (born and died 18 June 1679), Archduchess of Austria.
- Maria Elisabeth Lucia Theresia Josepha (13 December 1680 – 26 August 1741), Archduchess of Austria; she became Governor of the Austrian Netherlands.
- Leopold Joseph Philip Wilhelm Anton Franz Erasmus (2 June 1682 – 3 August 1684), Archduke of Austria.
- Maria Anna Josepha Antonia Regina (7 September 1683 – 14 August 1754), Archduchess of Austria; married King John V of Portugal.
- Maria Theresia Josepha Antonia Xaveria (22 August 1684 – 28 September 1696), Archduchess of Austria.
- Charles Franz Joseph Wenceslaus Balthasar Johann Anton Ignaz (1 October 1685 – 20 October 1740), who became the successor of his older brother as Charles VI, Holy Roman Emperor. He was last male member of the House of Habsburg and father of the famous Empress Maria Theresa.
- Maria Josepha Coletta Antonia (6 March 1687 – 14 April 1703), Archduchess of Austria.
- Maria Magdalena Josepha Antonia Gabriella (26 March 1689 – 1 May 1743), Archduchess of Austria.
- Maria Margaretha Magdalena Gabriella Josepha Antonia (22 July 1690 – 22 April 1691), Archduchess of Austria.

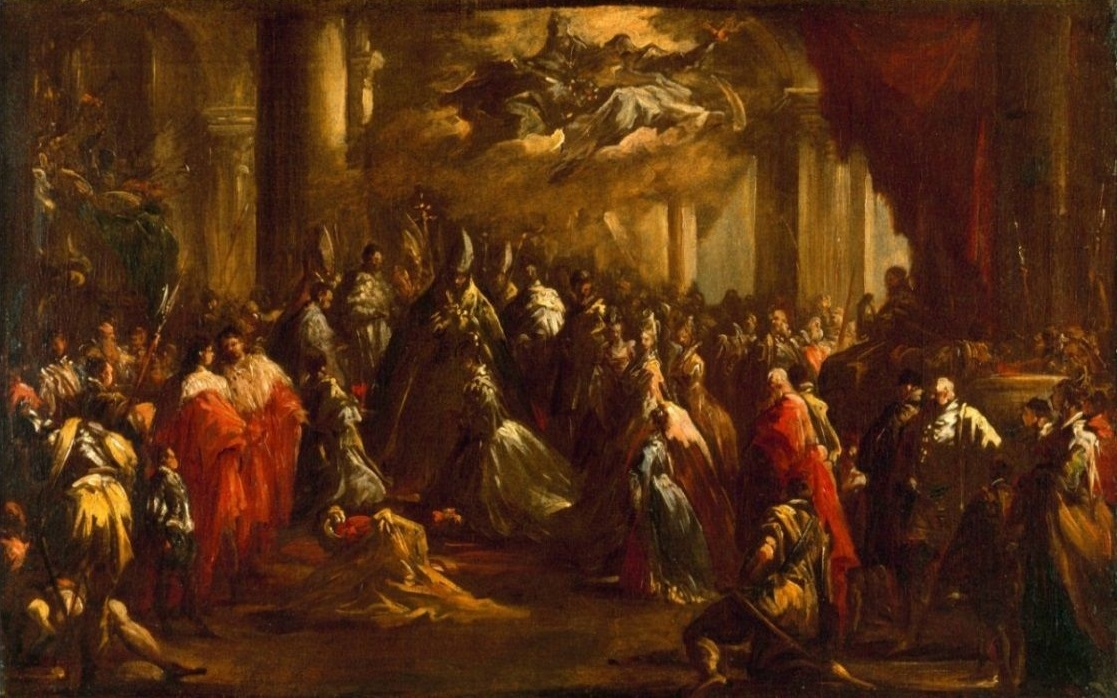
Coronation of Eleonore Magdalene as a Holy Roman Empress, painted by Giovanni Antonio Pellegrini, ca. 1713-15.

However, Eleonore had to face great challenges in the first years as Empress. During 1679, an outbreak of plague forced the Imperial family to leave Vienna, firstly to Mariazell and then in Prague, but the disease eventually reached those places. In addition, an uprising of the Bohemian peasants forced the empress and her children escape to Linz Castle. However, no less a danger than the epidemic was the constant threat of the Ottoman Empire. In July 1683, the Imperial family again left Vienna and moved to Passau because of the threat from the Turks, who in September of the same year suffered a crushing defeat near Vienna. Because of these events, Eleonore wasn't crowned immediately after her marriage. On 9 December 1681 and at the request of the Hungarian nobility, she was crowned Queen of Hungary in Pressburg. In 1685, her father became Elector Palatine. On 19 January 1690, she was crowned Holy Roman Empress at Augsburg Cathedral. At the time of her Imperial coronation, she was pregnant with her tenth and last child. She accompanied her husband on his travels (for example, at the Diet of Augsburg in 1689) and supervised the education of her children personally.

=== Political Influence ===
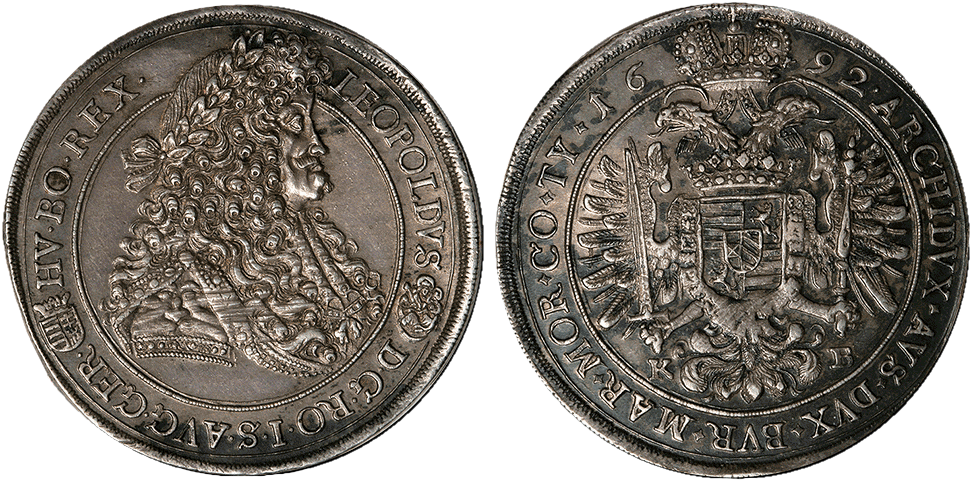
Hungarian Thaler of Leopold I minted in 1692

Eleonore was politically active and wielded considerable influence over her husband. It was reported that the empress received and opened important political documents while Leopold I stood waiting beside her "as a secretary".

As empress, Eleonore took control over the economy of the imperial court and managed to reduce its expenses through more effective organization. She had always paid great attention to matters of charity, but her patronage towards people in need still had some boundaries. The imperial revenue became vast enough to not only order the building of hospitals, orphanages, and Carmelite convents in Graz and Vienna, but support numerous brotherhoods, churches and monasteries.

As she was multilingual, Eleonore translated foreign political documents for her husband, as many were written in French. She established extensive connections through her patronage and granting of favours: she protected the career of chancellor Theodor von Strattman and recommended Jesuits Bauer and Vitus Georg Tönnemann as advisers to the emperor. In 1686, she restored the Order of the Starry Cross, established by her stepmother-in-law. The Capuchin Marco d'Aviano was her confessor and adviser.

Eleonore attended to the interests of her biological family by securing high status marriages for her sisters, promoting the careers of her younger brothers in church as well as the political needs of her eldest brother, the Elector Palatine. She arranged the marriages of both her sons, but deeply disliked the private life of her oldest son Joseph, scolding him for his infidelities and placing his procurers in prison.

=== Court of the Empress ===
Empress Eleonore was seen to be performing her duties well according to the strict Spanish court ceremony used in Vienna. Her court was affected by her strong religious views: strict, simple and convent-like. It was strictly adhered to all religious festivals and prescriptions and many courtiers said it was "an atmosphere reminiscent of an eternal mourning period", which was somewhat ridiculed as being exaggerated.

Eleonore actively participated in shooting matches and hunting parties as well as the religious duties associated with the pietas austriaca. From 1688, she devoted much time to the Marian cult, in which she was introduced by Abraham á Sancta Clara and to which she introduced her two daughters-in-law. She was an active member of the Gesellenschaft det Sklavinnen oder Leibeign Mariens, a lay order devoted to Virgin Mary, which prescribed daily religious observance and religious charity. In 1688, she received the Sternkreuzorden. During a joint pilgrimage, the imperial couple paid a visit to the Shrine of Our Lady of Altötting. Another miraculous image of the Virgin Mary from Pötsch (Hungarian: Máriapócs), known as the "Weeping Madonna", was delivered by them and placed in St. Stephen's Cathedral, Vienna. On 9 May 1684, the empress received the Golden Rose from Pope Innocent XI.

== Empress Mother ==
=== Reign of Joseph I ===
Emperor Leopold I died in 1705 and was succeeded by her eldest son, Joseph I. After her husband's death, Eleonore was known for dressing in mourning for the remainder of her life. During the reign of Joseph I, she endeavoured to keep her political influence in defiance of her daughter-in-law, Wilhelmine Amalia of Brunswick-Lüneburg, with whom she had a difficult relationship. One of the few things the two women agreed was their great disapproval of Joseph's official mistress, Marianne Pálffy, but both were powerless to stop it. After arranging her son Charles's marriage, Eleonore supervised the Catholic education of his convert bride, Elisabeth Christine of Brunswick-Wolfenbüttel, by taking her on a pilgrimage to Mariazell in 1706 prior to the marriage in 1707.

=== Regency ===
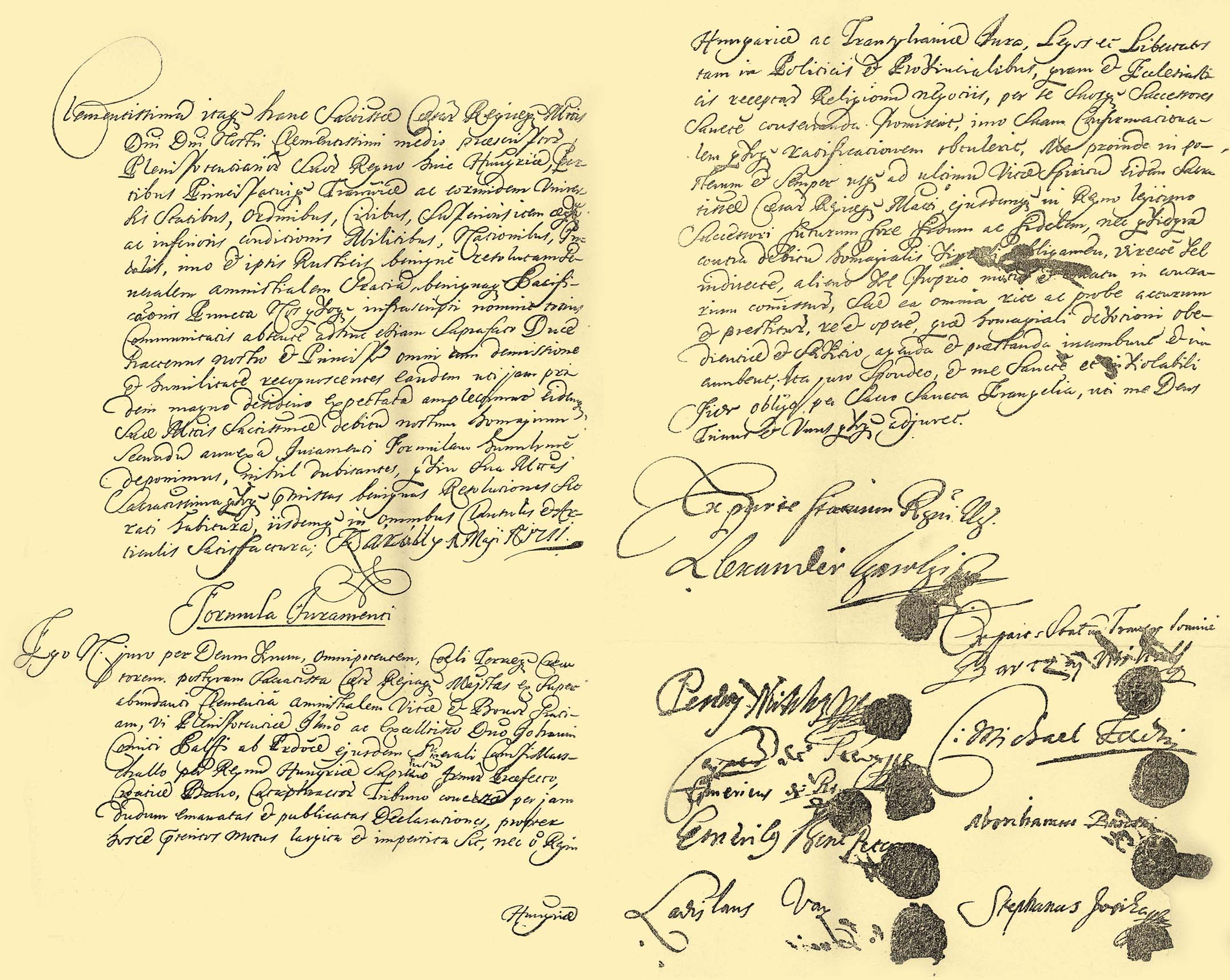
Treaty of Szatmár's contractual document, Austrian National Archives

In 1711, Emperor Joseph I died, and was succeeded as ruler of the Habsburg monarchy by his younger brother Charles, at that point absent in Spain. Eleonore was invested as Interim Regent of the Habsburg lands by the privy conference while Charles traveled from Barcelona to Vienna. As such, she was supported by her daughters. Despite his mother's political capacity, Charles had no confidence in her rule because of her emotional instability and ordered his confidant chancellor Count John Wenceslau Wratislaw von Mitrowitz to report to him about her rule, which placed him in conflict with Eleonore. The only known hostile acts the Empress Regent made were the confiscation of the gifts Joseph I had given to Marianne Pálffy, the order towards her late son's mistress to marry if she didn't wish to be expelled from court for good, and firing Feldmarschall Johann Graf Pálffy von Erdöd, brother of the former mistress, who was at that point negotiating the peace with Hungary after the Rákóczi Rebellion. His colleagues, however, persuaded Eleonore to restore him in his posts.

Despite those actions, Eleonore's regency was considerably successful. After negotiations were completed, she signed the Treaty of Szatmár, which recognized the rule of the House of Habsburg in the Kingdom of Hungary. She congratulated the successful diplomat Alexander Károlyi by appointing him as general. There was a fear among the ministers that she would use her position to defend the rights of her brother, the Elector Palatine, to the Upper Palatinate in a time when the interests of Austria would be better benefited by sacrificing his lands to Bavaria, which claimed it. Despite those fears, the Empress Regent presided over the 1711 imperial election and favoured the election of her son Charles as emperor.

=== Reign of Charles VI ===
During the reign of Charles VI, Eleonore and her daughter-in-law Wilhelmine Amalia engaged in the succession on behalf of Joseph I's daughters. Through the secret Mutual Pact of Succession (Pactum Mutuae Successionis) of 1703, signed by both Joseph and Charles with the knowledge and consent of their father, was determined that if both brothers died without surviving male issue, the daughters of the elder brother would have absolute precedence over the daughters of the younger brother, meaning that the eldest daughter of Joseph would ascend all the Habsburg thrones. In the case that both brothers died without surviving issue, their surviving sisters would be the heiresses. This secret pact was only known to Leopold I, his sons and Count Johann Friedrich von Seilern und Aspang. Neither Eleonore or her daughters-in-law knew for certain that the document existed, but they had heard of it, but both were very active in establishing the truth and pressuring Charles to establish a public succession order, which would be necessary for court protocol. In 1712, Wilhelmine Amalia managed to persuade Count Seilern to give her the document, which she sent to the head of her family George Louis, Elector, who sent Gottfried Wilhelm Leibniz, to help her to negotiate with Charles VI her daughters' rights. When Charles VI presented the original version of the Pactum Mutuae Successionis on 21 April 1713, Wilhelmine Amalia had triumphed in making him recognize the secret succession order of 1703. It was at a dinner with Eleonore, in the presence of the numerous archduchesses, that Seilern informed them of this. However, the success of Wilhelmine Amalia was short-lived: only a few days before, on 19 April, Charles VI already announced his wish to amend the Pact in order to give his own future daughters precedence over his nieces in a secret session of the council.

In 1719, Charles VI was diplomatically forced to arrest his maternal aunt and first cousin, Hedwig Elisabeth, Princess Sobieski and Maria Clementina Sobieska, to stop the marriage between the latter and the Jacobite pretender James Francis Edward Stuart in Rome. However, the Empress Mother managed to delay the transmission of the warrant for quite some time during their travel through Austrian lands before her relatives were placed under arrest in Innsbrück. Eleonore continued to use her connections to prevent Charles from marrying Maria Clementina to someone else, such as the Duke of Modena, and eventually assisted in her niece's escape from Austria to Italy.

== Last years ==
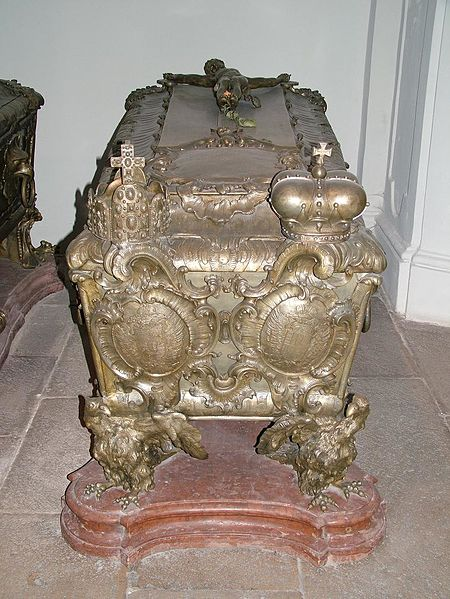
Empress Eleonore's coffin at the Imperial Crypt, Vienna

During her last years, Eleonore lived as a nun. In her will, she instructed to her servants, who had witnessed her ascetic life, never to tell anyone about this. On 1 January 1720, in preparation for the sacrament of confession, the Empress Mother suffered a stroke, which led her being paralyzed on the right side of her body. She received the Anointing of the Sick and gave her maternal blessings to her children and grandchildren, who reunited at her deathbed. During her final days, Eleonore was constantly nursed by her two daughters-in-law Wilhelmine Amalia (with whom she now had a close relationship) and Elisabeth Christine.

Eleonore Magdalene died on 19 January 1720, at the age of 65. Four months later, on 24 May, she was buried at the Imperial Crypt in Vienna. In her memory, a temporary wooden church was built at the imperial court, named the "sorrow castle" (Latin: Castrum dolorum). According to her last will, her remains were placed in an ordinary wooden coffin, which was placed at the foot of Leopold I's tomb. Her heart was put in an urn and placed in the Herzgruft at the Augustinian Church. In the year of her death, were published six epitaphs, among them poet Johann Christian Günther (who described her as a paragon of virtue and faith). The current lead Baroque coffin which contains Eleonore's remains was a work of Balthasar Ferdinand Moll and was made in August 1755 following the orders of her granddaughter, Empress Maria Theresa, because the old wooden coffin had considerably deteriorated.

== Sources ==
- Braun, Bettina; Keller, Katrin; Schnettger, Matthias (4 April 2016). Nur die Frau des Kaisers?: Kaiserinnen in der Frühen Neuzeit (in German). Böhlau Verlag Wien. ISBN 978-3-205-20085-7. online
- Coxe, Guglielmo (1824). Geschichte des Hauses Oesterreich von Rudolph von Habsburg bis auf Leopold des II. Tod (1218 — 1792). Amsterdam: Kunst u. Industrie Compt., 629 p. online
- von Wurzbach, C. (1860). Habsburg, Eleonora Magdalena Theresia von der Pfalz. Vienna: Kaiserlich-königliche Hof- und Staatsdruckerei., 492 p. online
- Wheatcroft, Andrew (1995). The Habsburgs: Embodying Empire. London: Penguin Books. ISBN 0-670-85490-5.
- Konrad Kramar und Petra Stuiber: „Die schrulligen Habsburger – Marotten und Allüren eines Kaiserhauses“. Ueberreuter, Wien 1999, ISBN 3-8000-3742-4.
- Holborn, Hajo: A History of Modern Germany: 1648–1840 Princeton University Press 1982 ISBN 0-691-00796-9
- Crankshaw, Edward: Maria Theresa, Longman publishers 1969
- Mahan, J. Alexander: Maria Theresa of Austria READ BOOKS 2007 ISBN 1-4067-3370-9

=== Royal titles ===
Eleonore Magdalene of Neuburg House of Wittelsbach Born: 6 January 1655 Died: 19 January 1720
German royalty
Preceded by Claudia Felicitas of Austria	Empress of the Holy Roman Empire; Archduchess consort of Austria; 1676–1705	Succeeded by Wilhelmina Amalia of Brunswick
Preceded by Claudia Felicitas of Austria	German Queen; 1676–1690	Succeeded by Wilhelmina Amalia of Brunswick
Preceded by Claudia Felicitas of Austria	Queen consort of Hungary; 1676–1705	Succeeded by Wilhelmina Amalia of Brunswick
Preceded by Claudia Felicitas of Austria	Queen consort of Bohemia; 1676–1705	Succeeded by Wilhelmina Amalia of Brunswick
Preceded by Jelena Zrinski	Princess consort of Transylvania; 1691–1705	Succeeded by Wilhelmina Amalia of Brunswick
