= Vitus Georg Tönnemann =

Vitus Georg Tönnemann (1659–1740), a German Jesuit, was the only confessor to Emperor Charles VI from 1711 to 1740 - throughout his reign. Despite that position, he is largely a forgotten figure now.

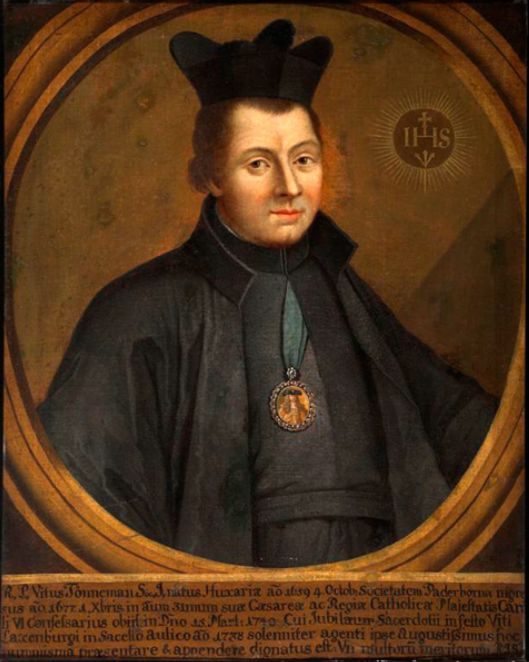
Vitus Georg Tönnemann

== Biography ==
Tönnemann was born in 1659 in Höxter, the son of Heinrich Tönnemann, lawyer and adviser to the Prince-Bishop of Munster (von Galen). His nephew, Baron Christoph von Tönnemann, became an Imperial Court Judge in Wetzlar. Tönnemann was educated at the Jesuit Gymnasium in Paderborn, then studied Literae Humaniores for four years at the Paderborn University. On 7 December 1677 he entered the Jesuit Order, taking the name Vitus. As a novice he went to their college at Trier. He completed his theological studies at Munster University, receiving a doctorate in Philosophy summa cum laude (Latin honors). He then lectured at Paderborn as a professor of Philosophy and Theology. He was ordained to the priesthood in 1688, taking his final vows to the Society of Jesus in 1692. He was a professor of Theology and Philosophy in Paderborn until 1692.

At that time, the Society was locked in an inheritance dispute over the Buren estate, involving the Elector of Brandenburg, amongst others. The Jesuit Order dispatched Tonneman to Vienna in 1692, to represent their cause to Leopold I, Holy Roman Emperor. The Jesuits met with success, not least because Leopold I was greatly under their influence. Tönnemann soon became known at the Habsburg court for his legal expertise. This came to notice to Leopold I, and he appointed Tönnemann as a tutor to Joseph von Lothringen in 1701. In 1705 Joseph I succeeded his father as the Holy Roman Emperor.

The Archduke Charles - Leopold's younger son - had meanwhile been posted to Spain, as the claimant to the Spanish Crown (the War of the Spanish Succession). Tönnemann was appointed as his confessor in 1705.

One of his tasks was to arrange a marriage for Charles. He travelled to Barcelona in order to negotiate the marriage of Princess Elisabeth Christine of Brunswick-Wolfenbüttel to Charles. The union was celebrated on 1 August 1708.

The appointment was highly successful, with Tönnemann winning the trust of the young Archduke. After Joseph I died in 1711, Charles became the ruler of the Empire. Tönnemann returned with him to Vienna, remaining his adviser and confessor until his death in March 1740. Charles died six months later, holding the crucifix given to him by Tönnemann.

Since politics and religion were linked in the Habsburg Empire, Tönnemann's duties were various. He was Chaplain-in-Chief of the Imperial Army. He was also a political adviser to Charles, with considerable influence, which is clear from the correspondence of the two men. The Roman Catholic Church and Habsburg Empire still needed each other - this alliance preserved the Habsburgs and defeated Protestantism in Central Europe.

Charles VI is remembered for his Pragmatic Sanction - promulgated in 1724 - in which he stated that his daughter - Maria Theresia - was to succeed to the undivided inheritance in the event of his death without a male heir. She did indeed succeed her father and ruled for 40 years. Tönnemann's legal experience and access to the Emperor (and his daughter) is likely to have played a part in the negotiations with the German Princess.

Tönnemann was directly involved in mediating in the Salzburg crisis of 1732, when the Archbishop of Salzburg decided to expel all Protestants from his territory as dissidents. This caused outrage in Protestant Europe, and embarrassment to the Emperor.

Tönnemann's correspondence with the German Princes of the Empire, The Vatican and also with his own Society in Paderborn is preserved, but scattered in diverse archives.

He was honoured with a state banquet at the Laxenburg Palace - unheard of for a commoner - to celebrate his Golden Jubilee as a priest in 1738.

It was also unheard of for the Emperor to visit a commoner in person. But Charles visited the Jesuit residence where Tönnemann lay terminally ill in March 1740. Tönnemann was laid to rest in the Jesuit Crypt in Platz-am Hof, Vienna. Charles VI died in October that year.
