= Archduchess Maria Theresa of Austria (1684–1696) =

Austrian archduchess (1684–1696)

Maria Theresa of Austria
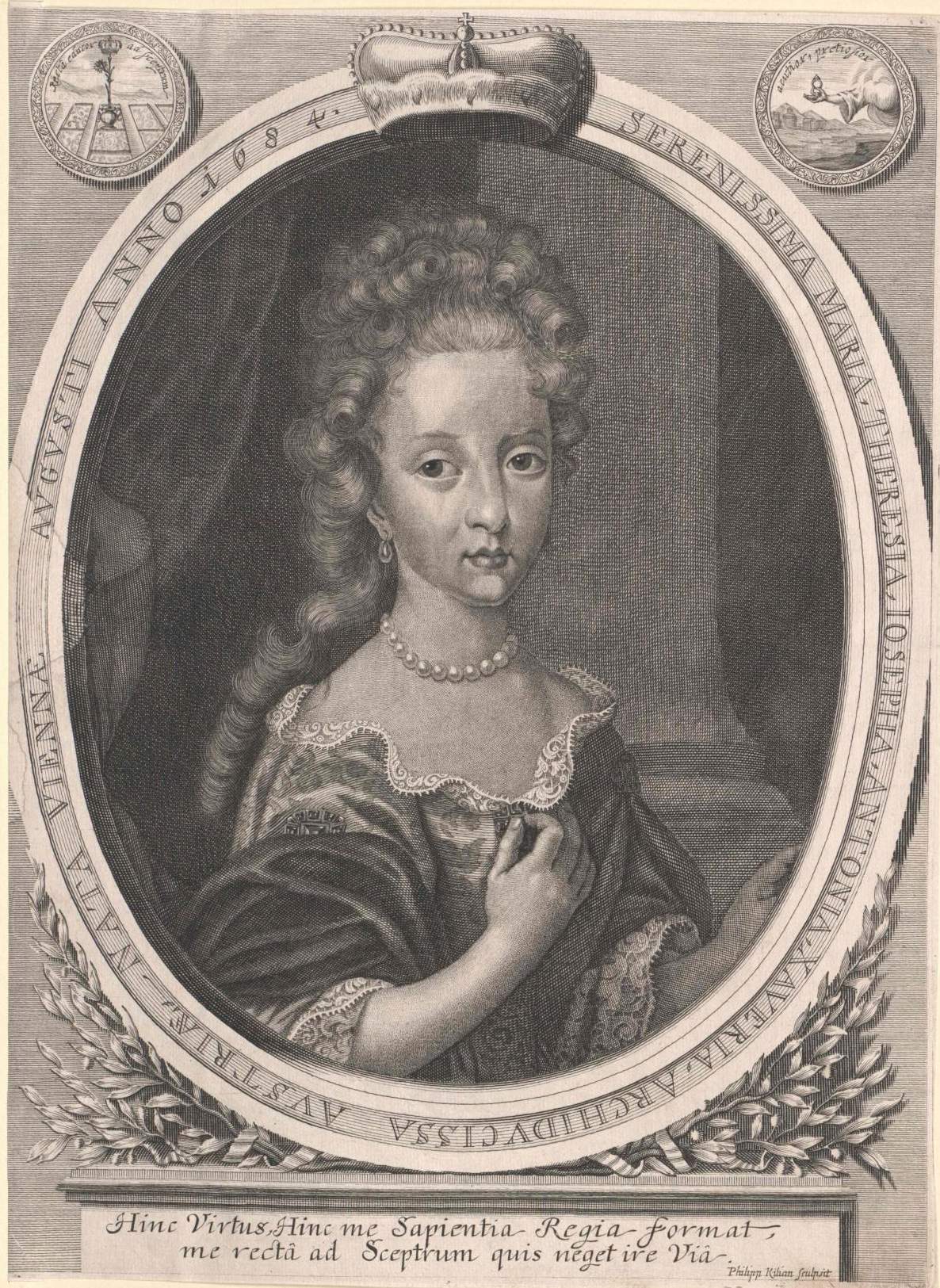
- Born: 22 August 1684; Hofburg Palace, Vienna, Archduchy of Austria, Holy Roman Empire
- Died: 28 September 1696 (aged 12); Palais Ebersdorf, Vienna, Archduchy of Austria, Holy Roman Empire
- Burial: Imperial Crypt, Vienna
- Father: Leopold I, Holy Roman Emperor
- Mother: Eleonore Magdalene of the Palatinate

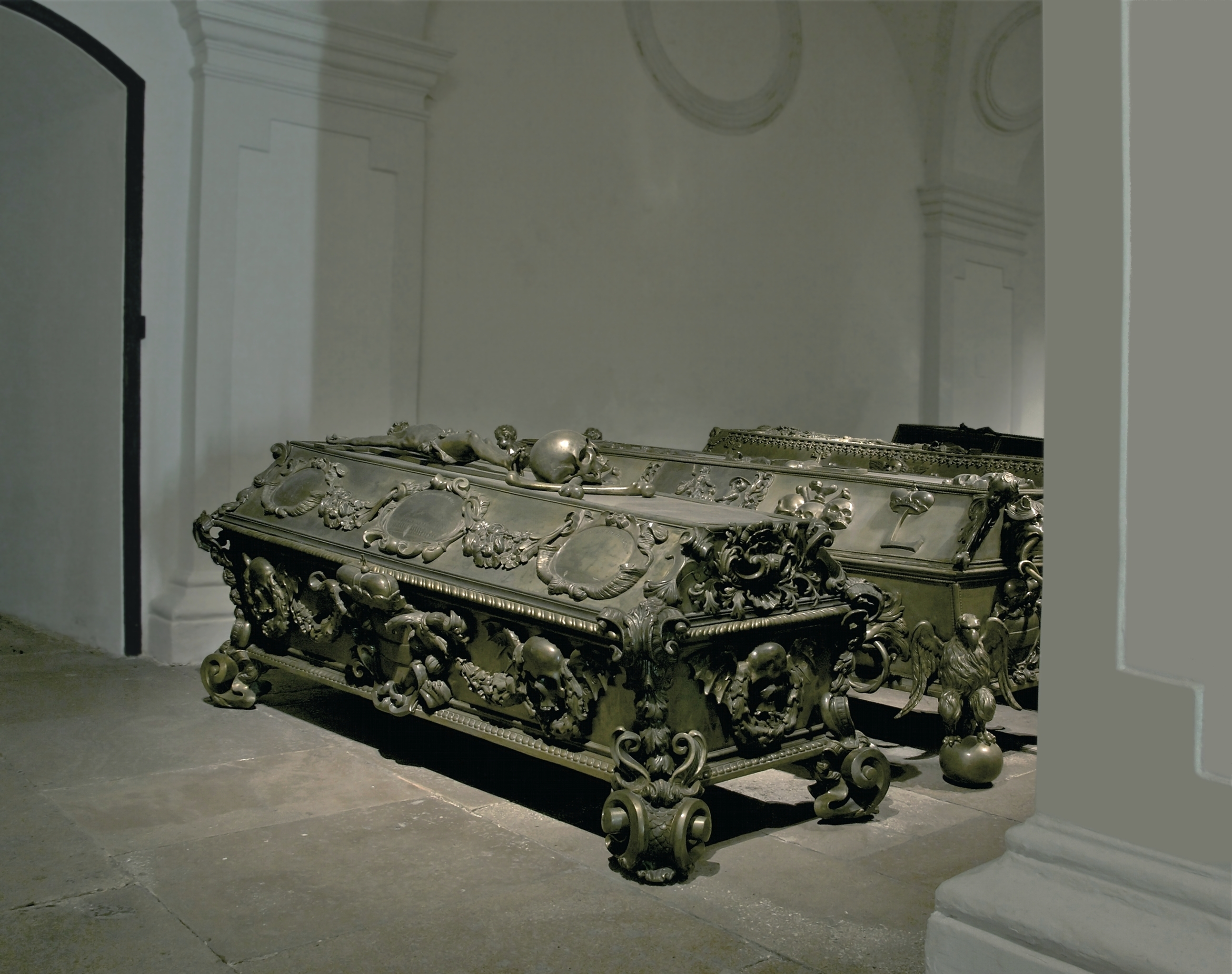
Maria Theresa's sarcophagus in the Imperial Crypt, Vienna, Austria

Maria Theresa of Austria (22 August 1684 – 28 September 1696) was a daughter of Leopold I, Holy Roman Emperor and his third wife, Eleonor Magdalene of the Palatinate-Neuburg.

== Biography ==
She was born at the Hofburg Palace in Vienna, as a member of the House of Habsburg, the fourth daughter of Leopold I, Holy Roman Emperor and his third wife, Eleonore Magdalena of Pfalz-Neuburg. Maria Theresa died of smallpox at the age of twelve, at the Palais Ebersdorf in Vienna. She is buried in the Imperial Crypt.

In 1695, at the age of 11, Maria Theresa was engaged to Maximilian II Emanuel, the Elector of Bavaria and widow of her older maternal half-sister Maria Antonia of Austria, as part of a political alliance between Austria and Bavaria. The marriage was arranged to strengthen the ties between the two states and secure Bavaria's support for the Habsburg dynasty, but she died before her wedding could take place.

== Ancestors ==
Ancestors of Archduchess Maria Theresa of Austria (1684–1696)

8. Ferdinand II, Holy Roman Emperor
4. Ferdinand III, Holy Roman Emperor
9. Maria Anna of Bavaria
2. Leopold I, Holy Roman Emperor
10. Philip III of Spain
5. Maria Anna of Austria
11. Margaret of Austria
1. Maria Theresa of Austria
12. Wolfgang William, Count Palatine of Neuburg
6. Philip William, Elector Palatine
13. Magdalene of Bavaria
3. Eleonore Magdalena of the Palatinate
14. George II, Landgrave of Hesse-Darmstadt
7. Elisabeth Amalie of Hesse-Darmstadt
15. Sophia Eleonore of Saxony
