= Archduchess Maria Magdalena of Austria =

Austrian archduchess (1689–1743)

Maria Magdalena of Austria
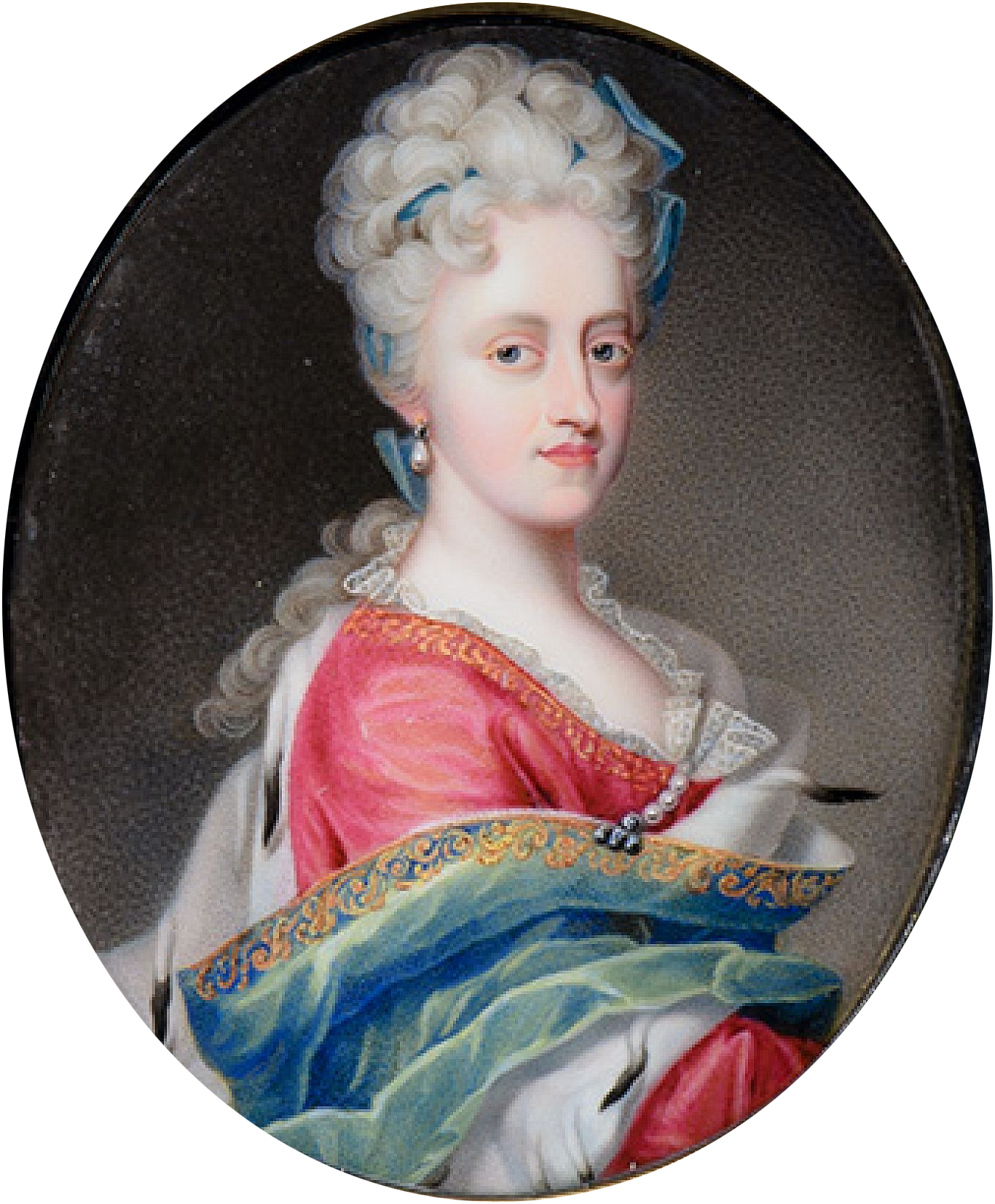
- Portrait by Johann Friedrich Ardin, c. 1712
- Born: 26 March 1689; Hofburg Palace, Vienna, Archduchy of Austria, Holy Roman Empire
- Died: 1 May 1743 (aged 54); Hofburg Palace, Vienna, Archduchy of Austria, Holy Roman Empire
- Burial: Imperial Crypt, Vienna
- Maria Magdalena Josepha Antonia Gabriela
- House: Habsburg
- Father: Leopold I, Holy Roman Emperor
- Mother: Eleonore Magdalene of the Palatinate

Maria Magdalena of Austria (Maria Magdalena Josefa Antonia Gabriela; 26 March 1689 – 1 May 1743) was a governor of Tyrol and daughter of Leopold I, Holy Roman Emperor and his third wife Eleonor Magdalene of the Palatinate-Neuburg. She died unmarried.

== Biography ==
Born at the Hofburg Palace in Vienna she was the ninth child of Emperor Leopold I and Eleonor Magdalene of the Palatinate-Neuburg. Shortly before the War of the Spanish Succession, there was the question of the new king of Spain, Philip V of Spain, marrying the archduchess, but Louis XIV was opposed to this match for political reasons, and the official reason given was that none of the archduchesses offered pleased his grandson. In 1708, her older sister Archduchess Maria Anna married John V of Portugal; plans for a second union between Austria and Portugal were discussed when Maria Magdalena was proposed as a bride for Infante Francis, Duke of Beja, brother of John V. Negotiations failed in the early stages and, as such, both candidates died unmarried. Again after the war the question of her becoming queen of Spain to replace the now deceased Luisa Maria of Savoy was floated. However, again it came to naught and Philip married Elisabeth Farnese instead.

After the failed marriage, she lived a life of seclusion and remained unmarried and died without issue. She had a close relationship to her niece Maria Theresa, the daughter of her brother Emperor Charles VI and future Empress and also with her sister Archduchess Maria Anna. She died of pneumonia at the age of 54. She was buried at the Imperial Crypt in Vienna.

== Ancestors ==
Ancestors of Archduchess Maria Magdalena of Austria

8. Ferdinand II, Holy Roman Emperor
4. Ferdinand III, Holy Roman Emperor
9. Maria Anna of Bavaria (≠ 17, 23)
2. Leopold I, Holy Roman Emperor
10. Philip III of Spain
5. Maria Anna of Austria
11. Margaret of Austria
1. Maria Magdalena of Austria
12. Wolfgang William, Count Palatine of Neuburg
6. Philip William, Elector Palatine
13. Magdalene of Bavaria
3. Eleonore Magdalena of the Palatinate
14. George II, Landgrave of Hesse-Darmstadt
7. Elisabeth Amalie of Hesse-Darmstadt
15. Sophia Eleonore of Saxony
