= Leopold I, Holy Roman Emperor =

Holy Roman Emperor from 1658 to 1705

Leopold I
- Imperator Romanorum
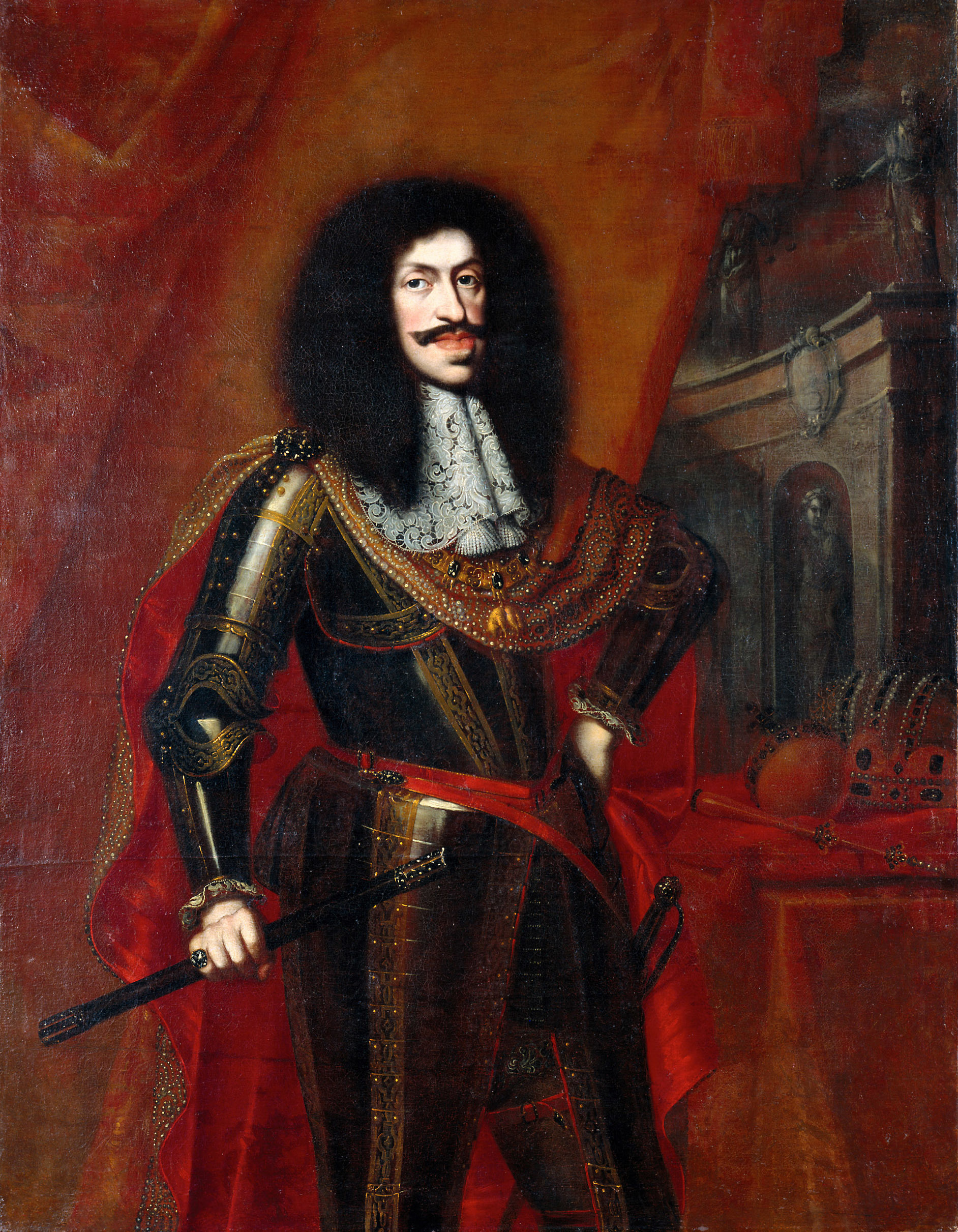
- Portrait by Benjamin von Block, c. 1672

Holy Roman Emperor
- Reign: 18 July 1658 – 5 May 1705
- Coronation: 1 August 1658; Frankfurt Cathedral
- Predecessor: Ferdinand III
- Successor: Joseph I

King of Hungary
- Reign: 27 June 1655 – 5 May 1705
- Coronation: 27 June 1655; Pozsony
- Predecessor: Ferdinand III
- Successor: Joseph I
- Co-rulers: Ferdinand III (1655–1657); Joseph I (1687–1705)

King of Bohemia
- Reign: 14 September 1656 – 5 May 1705
- Coronation: 14 September 1656; Prague
- Predecessor: Ferdinand III
- Successor: Joseph I

Archduke of Austria King of Croatia
- Reign: 2 April 1657 – 5 May 1705
- Predecessor: Ferdinand IV/III
- Successor: Joseph I
- Born: 9 June 1640; Vienna, Archduchy of Austria, Holy Roman Empire
- Died: 5 May 1705 (aged 64); Vienna, Archduchy of Austria, Holy Roman Empire
- Burial: Imperial Crypt
- Spouses: Margaret Theresa of Spain (m. 1666; died 1673) Claudia Felicitas of Austria (m. 1673; died 1676) Eleonore Magdalene of Neuburg (m. 1676)
- Issue Detail: Maria Antonia, Electress of Bavaria; Joseph I, Holy Roman Emperor; Archduchess Maria Elisabeth; Maria Anna, Queen of Portugal; Archduchess Maria Theresa; Charles VI, Holy Roman Emperor; Archduchess Maria Josepha; Archduchess Maria Magdalena
Names
- Leopold Ignaz Joseph Balthasar Franz Felician
- House: Habsburg
- Father: Ferdinand III, Holy Roman Emperor
- Mother: Maria Anna of Spain
- Religion: Catholic Church

Leopold I (Leopold Ignaz Joseph Balthasar Franz Felician; Hungarian: I. Lipót; 9 June 1640 – 5 May 1705) was Holy Roman Emperor, King of Germany, King of Hungary, Croatia and Bohemia. The second son of Ferdinand III, Holy Roman Emperor, by his first wife, Maria Anna of Spain, Leopold became heir apparent in 1654 after the death of his elder brother Ferdinand IV, King of the Romans. Elected in 1658, Leopold ruled the Holy Roman Empire until his death in 1705, becoming the second-longest-ruling emperor (46 years and 9 months) of the House of Habsburg. He was both a composer and a considerable patron of music.

Leopold's reign is known for conflicts with the Ottoman Empire in the Great Turkish War (1683–1699) and rivalry with Louis XIV, a contemporary and first cousin (on the maternal side; fourth cousin on the paternal side), in the west. After more than a decade of warfare, Leopold emerged victorious in the east thanks to the military talents of Prince Eugene of Savoy. By the Treaty of Karlowitz, Leopold recovered almost all of the Kingdom of Hungary, which had fallen under Turkish power in the years after the 1526 Battle of Mohács.

Leopold fought three wars against France: the Franco-Dutch War, the Nine Years' War, and the War of the Spanish Succession. In this last, Leopold sought to give his younger son Charles VI, Holy Roman Emperor the entire Spanish inheritance, disregarding the will of the late Charles II of Spain. Leopold started a war that soon engulfed much of Europe. The early years of the war went fairly well for Austria, with victories at Schellenberg and Blenheim, but the war would drag on until 1714, nine years after Leopold's death, which barely had an effect on the warring states. When peace returned with the Treaty of Rastatt, Austria could not be said to have emerged as triumphant as it had from the war against the Ottoman Turks.

== Early years ==
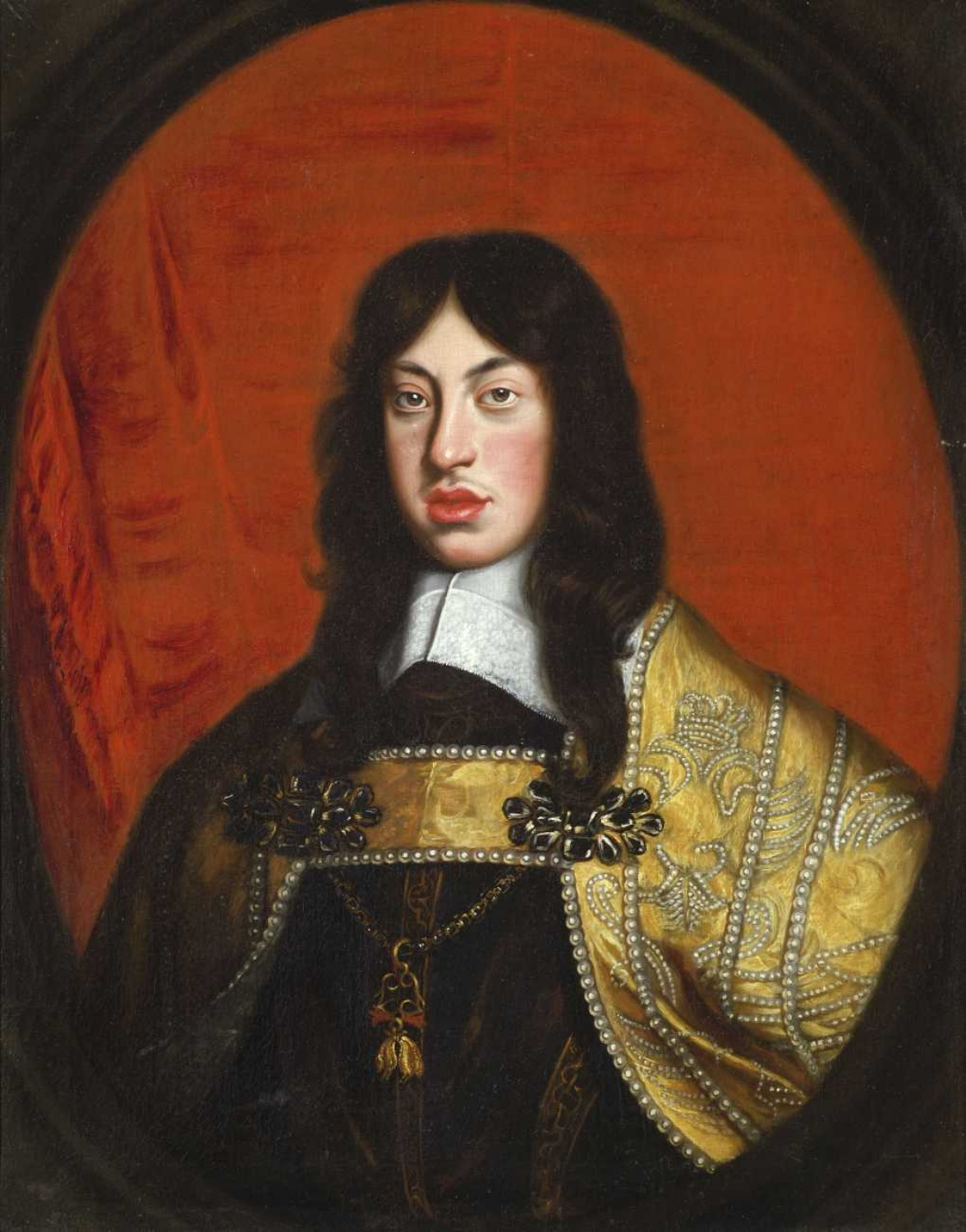
Young Leopold by anonymous, c. 1660

Born on 9 June 1640 in Vienna, Leopold received the traditional program of education in the liberal arts, history, literature, natural science and astronomy. He was particularly interested in music, as his father, Emperor Ferdinand III, had been. From an early age, Leopold showed an inclination toward learning. In addition to his native German, he became fluent in Latin, Italian and Spanish. Leopold disdained the German language and preferred to speak and read in Italian, which was the language most often spoken at his court and used in his official correspondence; in 1656, he founded an Italian literary academy in Vienna. Although some historians have noted this disdain of German to be exaggerated.

Likewise, he had received comprehensive ecclesiastical training as he had originally been selected for a career in the higher clergy. This plan, though, was dropped upon the 1654 death of his older brother, Ferdinand IV, King of the Romans, when Leopold became heir apparent. Nonetheless, Leopold's spiritual education had had a manifest impact on him. Leopold remained under the spell of his clerical education and Jesuit influence throughout his life. For a monarch, he was uncommonly knowledgeable about theology, metaphysics, jurisprudence and the sciences. He also retained his interest in astrology and alchemy, which he had developed under Jesuit tutors. A deeply religious and devoted person, Leopold personified the pietas Austriaca, or the loyal Catholic attitude of his house. On the other hand, his piety and education may have caused in him a fatalistic strain which inclined him to reject all compromise on denominational questions, which is not always considered a positive characteristic of a ruler.

Leopold was said to have typical Habsburg physical attributes, such as the prominent Habsburg lower jaw. Short, thin and of sick constitution, Leopold was cold and reserved in public and socially inept. However, he is also said to have been open with close associates. Coxe described Leopold in the following manner: "His gait was stately, slow and deliberate; his air pensive, his address awkward, his manner uncouth, his disposition cold and phlegmatic." Spielman argues that his long-expected career in the clergy caused Leopold to have "early adopted the intense Catholic piety expected of him and the gentle manners appropriate to a merely supporting role. He grew to manhood without the military ambition that characterised most of his fellow monarchs. From the beginning, his reign was defensive and profoundly conservative".

Elected king of Hungary in 1655, he followed suit in 1656 and 1657 in Bohemia and Croatia, respectively. In July 1658, more than a year after his father's death, Leopold was elected Holy Roman Emperor at Frankfurt in opposition to the French Cardinal Mazarin, who sought to place the Imperial Crown on the head of Ferdinand Maria, Elector of Bavaria or some other non-Habsburg prince. To conciliate France, which had considerable influence in German affairs thanks to the League of the Rhine, the newly elected emperor promised not to assist Spain, then at war with France. This marked the beginning of a nearly 47-year reign characterised by a lasting rivalry with France and its king, Louis XIV. The latter's dominant personality and power completely overshadowed Leopold, even to this day, but Leopold was no less a warrior-king, given that the greater part of his public life was directed towards the arrangement and furtherance of wars.

== Second Northern War ==
Leopold's first war was the Second Northern War (1655–1660), in which King Charles X of Sweden tried to become King of Poland with the aid of allies including György II Rákóczi, Prince of Transylvania. Leopold's predecessor, Ferdinand III, had allied with King John II Casimir Vasa of Poland in 1656. In 1657, Leopold expanded this alliance to include Austrian troops (paid by Poland). These troops helped defeat the Transylvanian army and campaigned as far as Denmark. The war ended with the Treaty of Oliwa in 1660.

== Early wars against the Ottoman Empire ==
The Ottoman Empire often interfered in the affairs of Transylvania, always an unruly state, and this interference brought on a war with the Holy Roman Empire, which, after some desultory operations, really began in 1663. By a personal appeal to the diet at Regensburg Leopold induced the princes to send assistance for the campaign; troops were also sent by France, and in August 1664, the great Imperial general Raimondo Montecuccoli gained a notable victory at Saint Gotthard. By the Peace of Vasvár the Emperor made a twenty years' truce with the Sultan, granting more generous terms than his recent victory seemed to render necessary.

== Wars against France ==
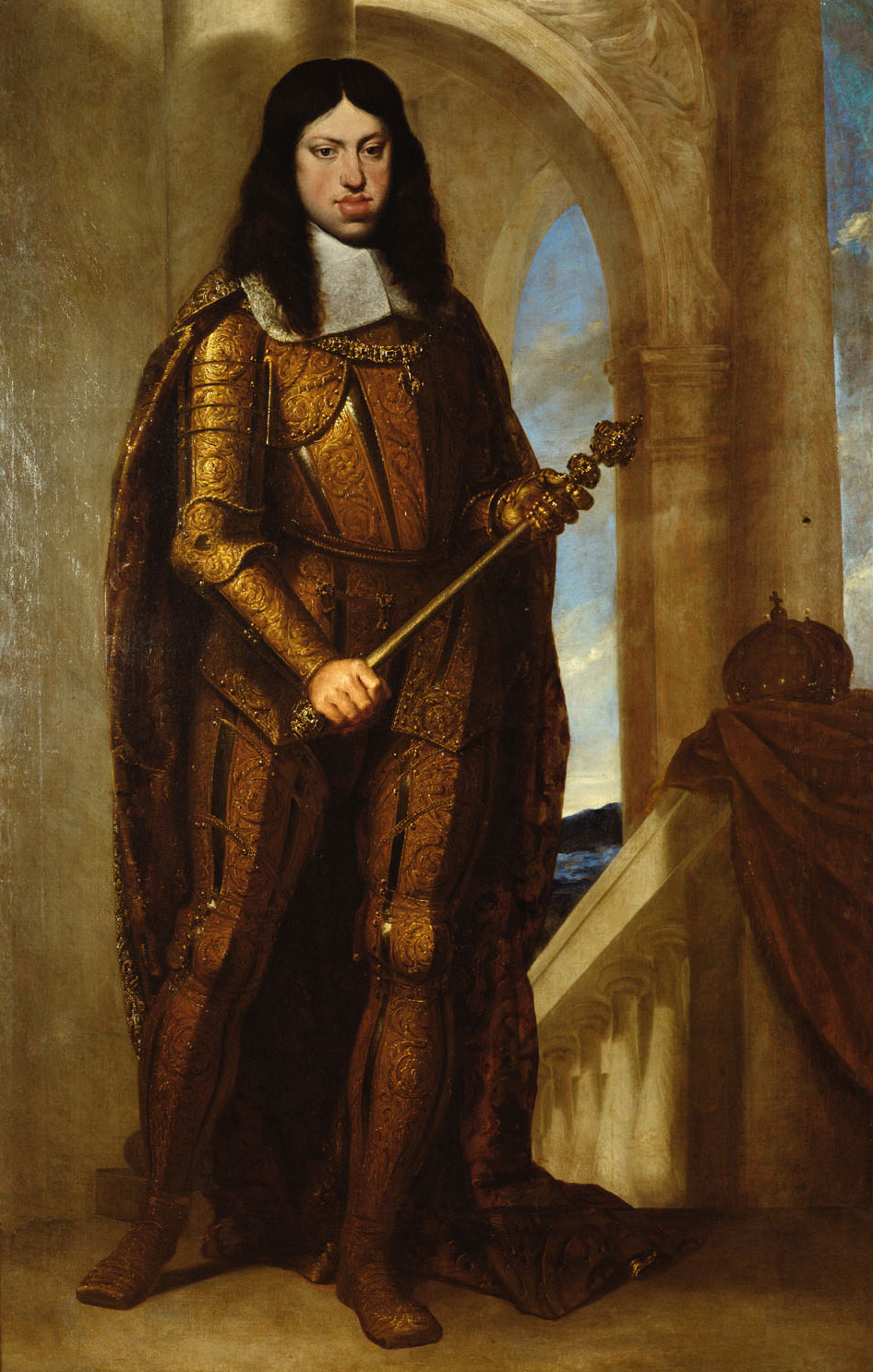
Leopold I, painted by Guido Cagnacci (1657–1658)

French expansion increasingly threatened the empire, especially the seizure of the strategic Duchy of Lorraine in 1670, followed by the 1672 Franco-Dutch War. By mid-June, the Dutch Republic teetered at the brink of destruction, which led Leopold to agree to an alliance with Brandenburg-Prussia and the Republic on 25 June. However, he was also facing a revolt in Hungary and viewed French conquests in the Rhineland a higher priority than helping the Dutch. His commander, Raimondo Montecuccoli, was ordered to remain on the defensive and avoid a direct conflict. Chaotic logistics made it impossible to maintain the troops and Brandenburg left the war in June 1673 under the Treaty of Vossem.

An anti-French Quadruple Alliance was formed in August, consisting of the Dutch Republic, Spain, Emperor Leopold and Charles IV, Duke of Lorraine, while in May 1674, the Imperial Diet declared it an Imperial war. The 1678 Treaty of Nijmegen is generally seen as a French victory, although the Alliance succeeded in limiting their gains.

Holy Roman Emperor
Coats of arms

Almost immediately after the conclusion of peace, Louis XIV renewed his aggressions on the German frontier through the Réunions policy. Engaged in a serious struggle with the Ottoman Empire, the emperor was again slow to move, and although he joined the Association League against France in 1682, he was glad to make a truce at Regensburg two years later. The whole European position was now bound up with events in England, and the tension lasted until 1688, when William III of England won the English crown through the Glorious Revolution and Louis invaded Germany. In May 1689, the Grand Alliance was formed, including the emperor, the kings of England, Spain and Denmark, the Elector of Brandenburg and others, and a fierce struggle against France was waged throughout almost the whole of Western Europe. In general, the several campaigns were favourable to the allies, and in September 1697, England, Spain and the United Provinces made peace with France at the Treaty of Rijswijk.

Leopold refused to assent to the treaty, as he considered that his allies had somewhat neglected his interests, but in the following month, he came to terms and a number of places were transferred from France to the Holy Roman Empire. The peace with France lasted for about four years and then Europe was involved in the War of the Spanish Succession. The King Charles II of Spain was a Habsburg by descent and was related by marriage to the Austrian branch, while a similar tie bound him to the royal house of France. He was feeble and childless, and attempts had been made by the European powers to arrange for a peaceable division of his extensive kingdom. Leopold refused to consent to any partition, and when in November 1700 Charles died, leaving his crown to Philip V of Spain, a grandson of Louis XIV, all hopes of a peaceable settlement vanished. Under the guidance of William III, a powerful league, a renewed Grand Alliance, was formed against France; of this, the emperor was a prominent member, and in 1703 he transferred his claim on the Spanish monarchy to his second son, Archduke Charles. The early course of the war was not favourable to the Imperialists, but the tide of defeat had been rolled back by the great victory of Blenheim before Leopold died on 5 May 1705.

== Internal problems ==
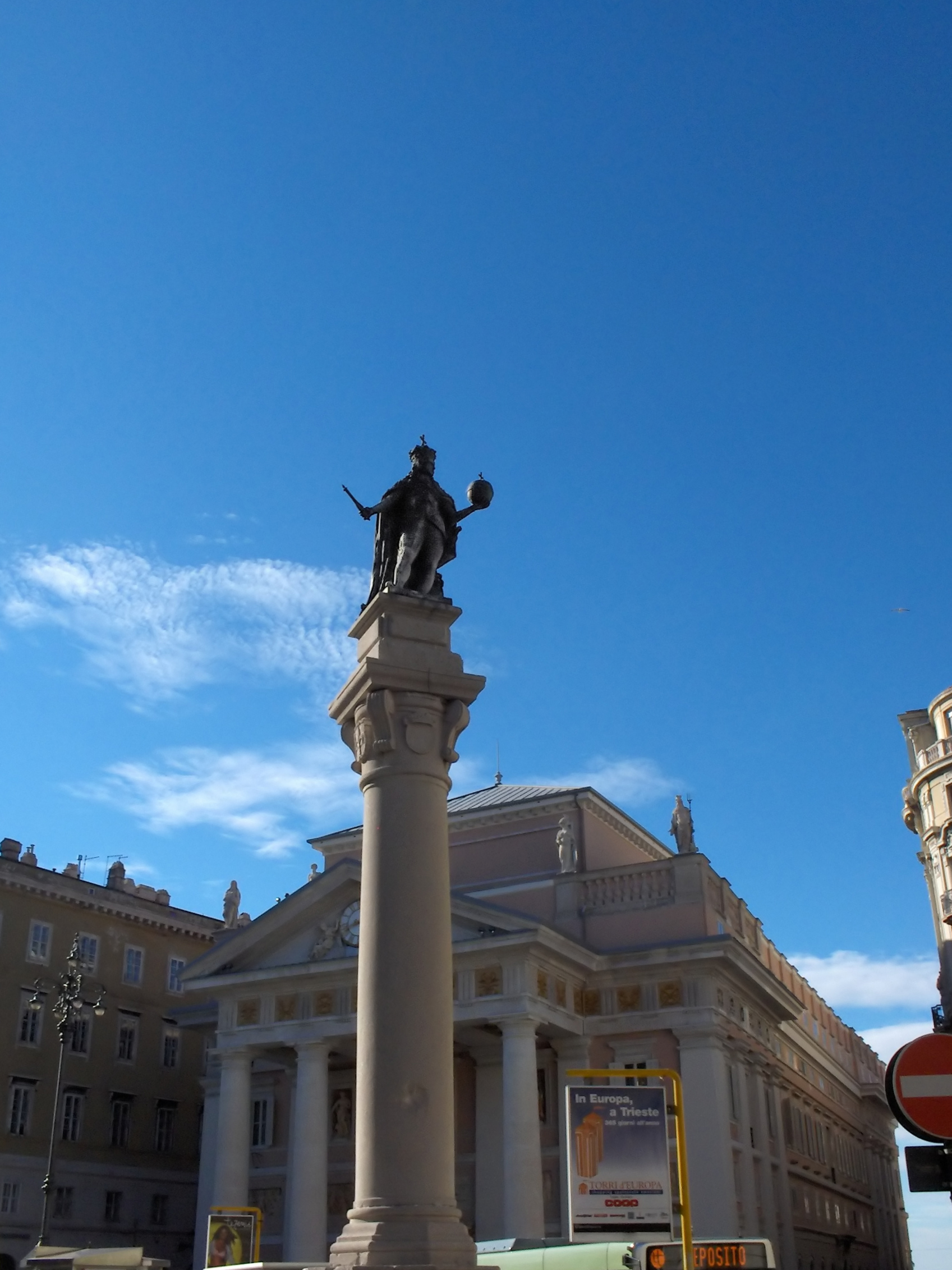
Leopold I column (1673) in Trieste

The emperor himself defined the guidelines of the politics. Johann Weikhard of Auersperg was dismissed in 1669 as the leading minister. He was followed by Wenzel Eusebius, Prince of Lobkowicz. Both had arranged some connections to France without the knowledge of the emperor. In 1674 Lobkowicz also lost his appointment.

He also expelled Jewish communities from his realm, for example, the Viennese Jewish community, which used to live in an area called "Im Werd" across the Danube Canal. After the expulsion of the Jewish population, with popular support, the area was renamed Leopoldstadt as a thanksgiving. But Frederick William, Elector of Brandenburg, issued an edict in 1677, in which he announced his special protection for 50 families of these expelled Jews.

In governing his own lands, Leopold found his chief difficulties in Hungary, where unrest was caused partly by his desire to crush Protestantism and partly by the so-called Magnate conspiracy. A rising was suppressed in 1671 and for some years, Hungary was treated with great severity. In 1681, after another rising, some grievances were removed and a less repressive policy was adopted, but this did not deter the Hungarians from revolting again. Austrian forces occupied the castle of Trebišov in 1675, but in 1682 Emeric Thököly captured it and then fled from continuous Austrian attacks, so they blew the castle up, leaving it in ruins. They fled as supposedly Hungarian rebel troops under the command of Emeric Thököly, cooperating with the Ottoman Turks, and sacked the city of Bielsko in 1682. In 1692, Leopold gave up his rights to the property, giving his rights by donation to Theresia Keglević.

Espousing the cause of the rebels, Sultan Mehmed IV sent an enormous army into Austria early in 1683; this advanced almost unchecked to Vienna, which was besieged from July to September, while Leopold took refuge at Passau. Realising the gravity of the situation somewhat tardily, some of the German princes, among them the electors of Saxony and Bavaria, led their contingents to the Imperial Army, which was commanded by the emperor's brother-in-law, Charles V, Duke of Lorraine, but the most redoubtable of Leopold's allies was the King of Poland, John III Sobieski, who was already dreaded by the Ottoman Turks.

== Success against the Ottoman Turks and in Hungary ==
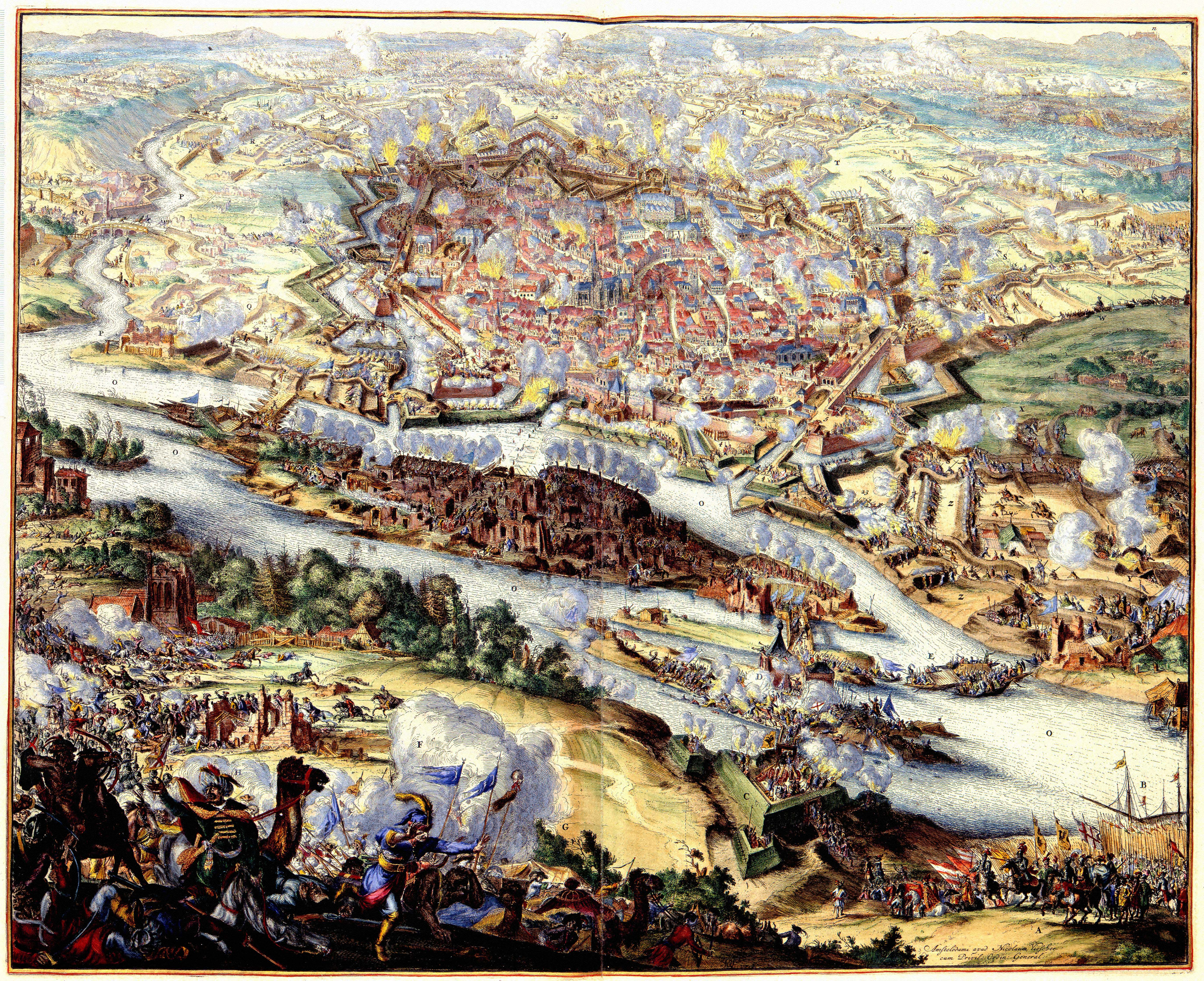
The Battle of Vienna marked the historic end of the expansion of the Ottoman Empire into Europe.

On 12 September 1683, the allied army fell upon the enemy, who was completely routed, and Vienna was saved. The Imperial forces, among whom Prince Eugene of Savoy was rapidly becoming prominent, followed up the victory with others, notably one near Mohács in 1687 and another at Zenta in 1697, and in January 1699, Sultan Mustafa II signed the Treaty of Karlowitz by which he ceded almost the whole of Hungary (including Serbs in Vojvodina) to the Habsburg monarchy. As the Habsburg forces retreated, they withdrew 37,000 Serb families under Patriarch Arsenije III Čarnojević of the Serbian Patriarchate of Peć. In 1690 and 1691, Emperor Leopold I had conceived through a number of edicts (Privileges) the autonomy of Serbs in his dominions, which would last and develop for more than two centuries until its abolition in 1912. Before the conclusion of the war, however, Leopold had taken measures to strengthen his hold upon this country. In 1687, the Diet of Hungary in Pressburg (now Bratislava) changed the constitution; the right of the Habsburgs to succeed to the throne without election was admitted and the emperor's elder son Joseph I, Holy Roman Emperor was crowned hereditary King of Hungary.

== The Holy Roman Empire ==
The Peace of Westphalia in 1648 had been a political defeat for the Habsburgs. It ended the idea that Europe was a single Roman Catholic empire, governed spiritually by the Pope and temporally by the Holy Roman Emperor. Moreover, the treaty was devoted to parcelling out land and influence to the "winners", the anti-Habsburg alliance led by France and Sweden. However, the Habsburgs did gain some benefits out of the Thirty Years' War; the Protestant aristocracy in Habsburg territories had been decimated, and the ties between Vienna and the Habsburg domains in Bohemia and elsewhere were greatly strengthened. These changes would allow Leopold to initiate necessary political and institutional reforms during his reign to develop somewhat of an absolutist state along French lines. The most important consequences of the war were, in retrospect, to weaken the Habsburgs as emperors but strengthen them in their own lands. Leopold was the first to realise this altered state of affairs and act in accordance with it.

=== Administrative reform ===
The reign of Leopold saw some important changes made in the constitution of the Empire. In 1663, the Imperial Diet entered upon the last stage of its existence and became a body permanently in session at Regensburg. This perpetual diet would become a vital tool for the consolidation of Habsburg power under Leopold.

=== Political changes ===
In 1692, the Duke of Hanover was raised to the rank of an elector, becoming the ninth member of the electoral college. In 1700, Leopold, greatly in need of help for the impending war with France, granted the title of King in Prussia to the Elector of Brandenburg. The net result of these and similar changes was to weaken the authority of the emperor over the princes of the empire and to compel him to rely more and more upon his position as ruler of the Austrian archduchies and of Hungary and Bohemia.

== Character and overall assessment ==
Leopold was a man of industry and education, and during his later years, he showed some political ability. Regarding himself as an absolute sovereign, he was extremely tenacious of his rights. Greatly influenced by the Jesuits, he was a staunch proponent of the Counter-Reformation. In person, he was short, but strong and healthy. Although he had no inclination for a military life, he loved exercise, such as hunting and riding. He also had a taste and talent for music and composed several Oratorios and Suites of Dances.

Perhaps due to inbreeding among his progenitors, the hereditary Habsburg jaw was most prominent in Leopold. Because his jaw was depicted as unusually large on a 1670 silver coin, Leopold was nicknamed "the Hogmouth"; however, most collectors do not believe the coin was an accurate depiction.

== Marriages and children ==
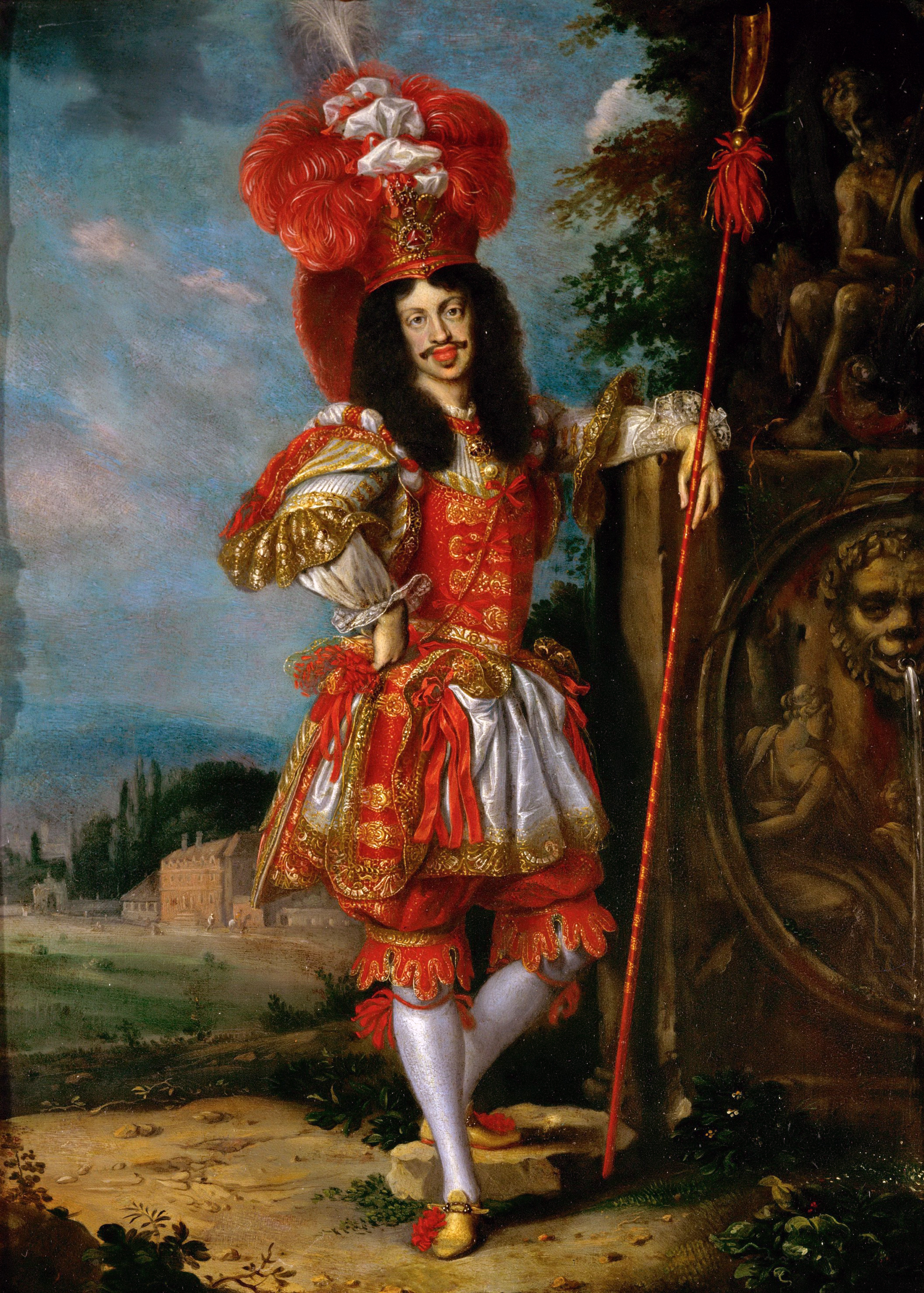
Leopold I in costume as Acis in La Galatea, 1667, by Jan Thomas van Ieperen, Kunsthistorisches Museum, Vienna

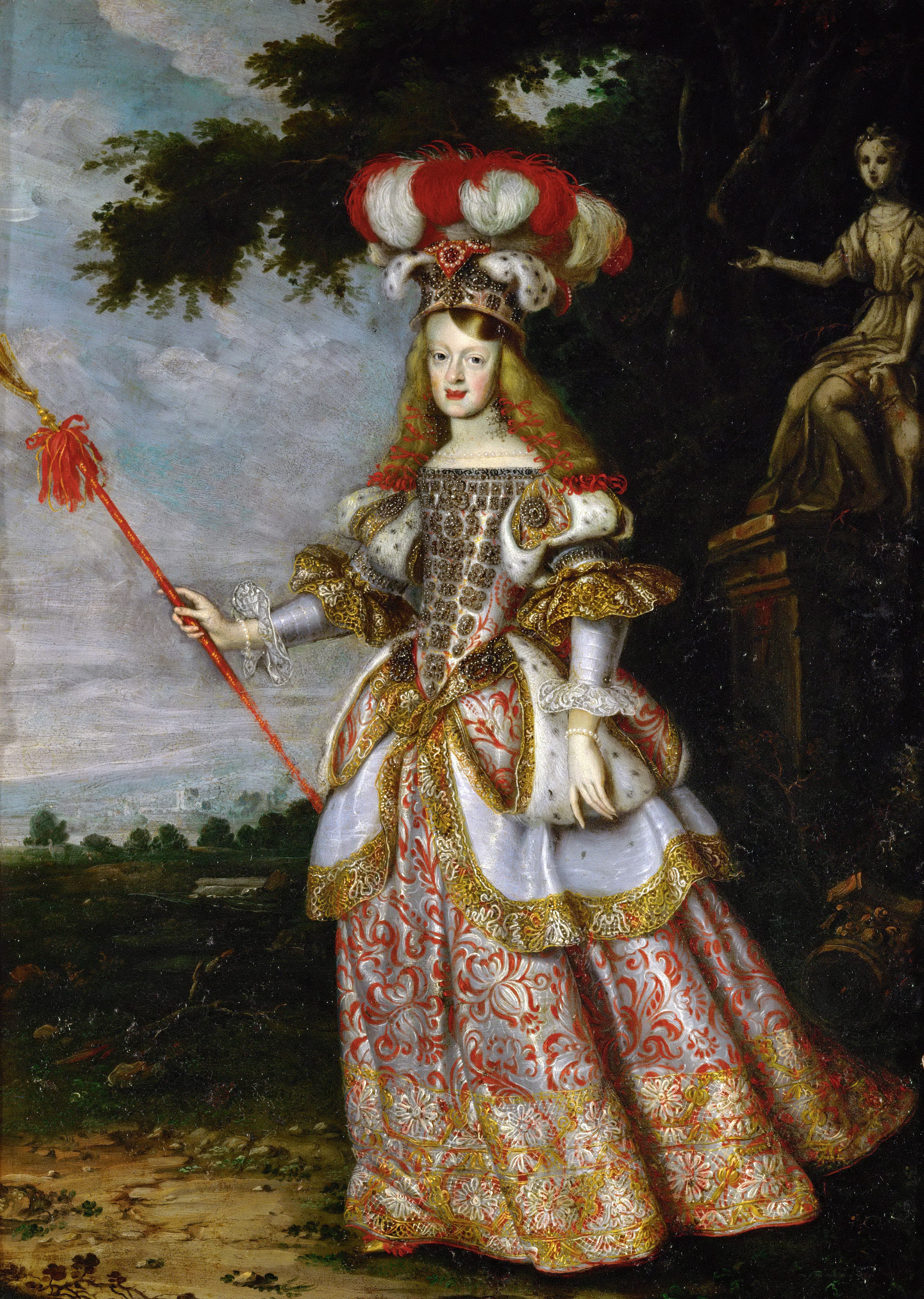
Margaret Theresa in theater dress, 1667, by Jan Thomas van Ieperen, Kunsthistorisches Museum, Vienna

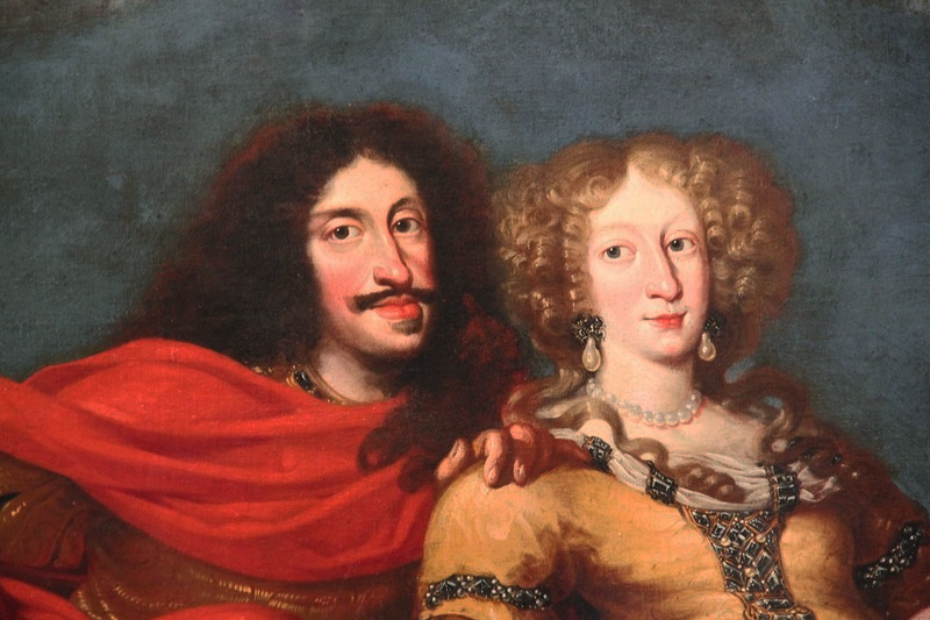
Leopold and Eleonore Magdalene, detail from 1684 portrait by Jakob Heybel

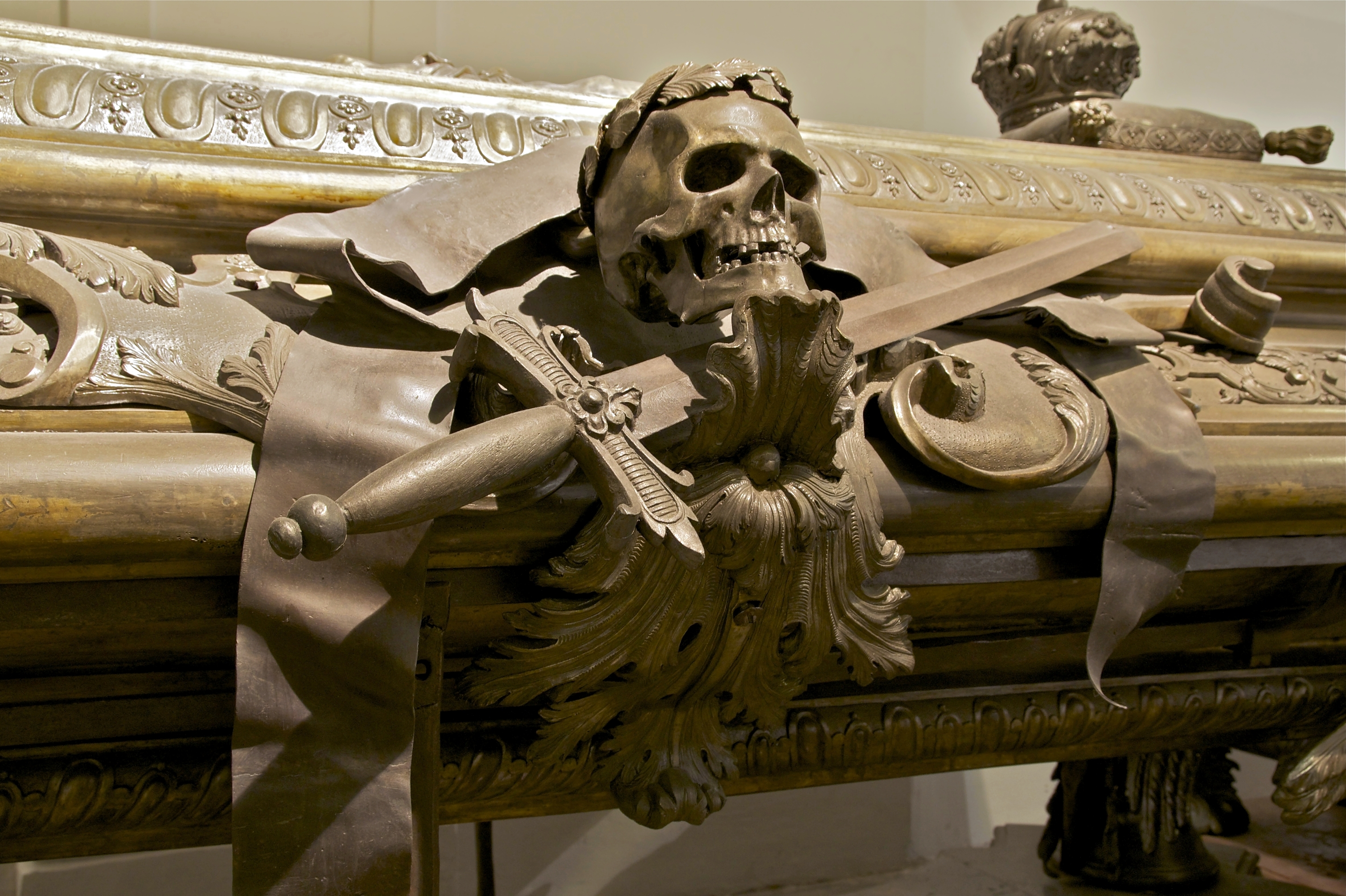
Detail of sarcophagus of Leopold I, Kapuzinergruft, Vienna, Austria

On 12 December 1666, he married Margaret Theresa of Spain (1651–1673), daughter of King Philip IV of Spain, who was both his niece and his first cousin. She was depicted in Diego Velázquez's paintings sent from the court of Madrid to Leopold as he waited in Vienna for his fiancée to grow up. Leopold and Margaret Theresa had four children, all but one short-lived:

1. Archduke Ferdinand Wenzel (1667–1668)
2. Maria Antonia of Austria (1669–1692), who married Maximilian II Emanuel, Elector of Bavaria
3. Archduke Johann Leopold (1670)
4. Archduchess Maria Anna Antonia (1672)

His second wife was Claudia Felicitas of Austria, who died in 1676 at the age of 22. Neither of their two daughters survived:

1. Archduchess Anna Maria Josepha (1674)
2. Archduchess Maria Josepha Clementina (1675–1676)

His third wife was Eleonore Magdalene of Neuburg. They had the following children:

1. Joseph I, Holy Roman Emperor (1678–1711), who married Wilhelmine Amalia of Brunswick-Lüneburg
2. Archduchess Maria Christina (1679)
3. Archduchess Maria Elisabeth (1680–1741), Governor of the Austrian Netherlands
4. Archduke Leopold Joseph (1682–1684)
5. Archduchess Maria Anna (1683–1754) married John V of Portugal
6. Archduchess Maria Theresa (1684–1696)
7. Charles VI, Holy Roman Emperor (1685–1740), who married Elisabeth Christine of Brunswick-Wolfenbüttel
8. Archduchess Maria Josepha (1687–1703)
9. Archduchess Maria Magdalena (1689–1743)
10. Archduchess Maria Margaret (1690–1691)

== Music ==
Like his father, Leopold was a patron of music and a composer himself. He continued to enrich the court's musical life by employing and providing support for distinguished composers such as Antonio Bertali, Giovanni Bononcini, Johann Kaspar Kerll, Ferdinand Tobias Richter, Alessandro Poglietti and Johann Fux. Leopold's surviving works show the influence of Bertali and Viennese composers in general (in oratorios and other dramatic works), and of Johann Heinrich Schmelzer (in ballets and German comedies). His sacred music is perhaps his most successful, particularly Missa angeli custodis, a Requiem Mass for his first wife, and Three Lections, composed for the burial of his second wife. Much of Leopold's music was published with works by his father, and described as "works of exceeding high merit."

== Coins ==
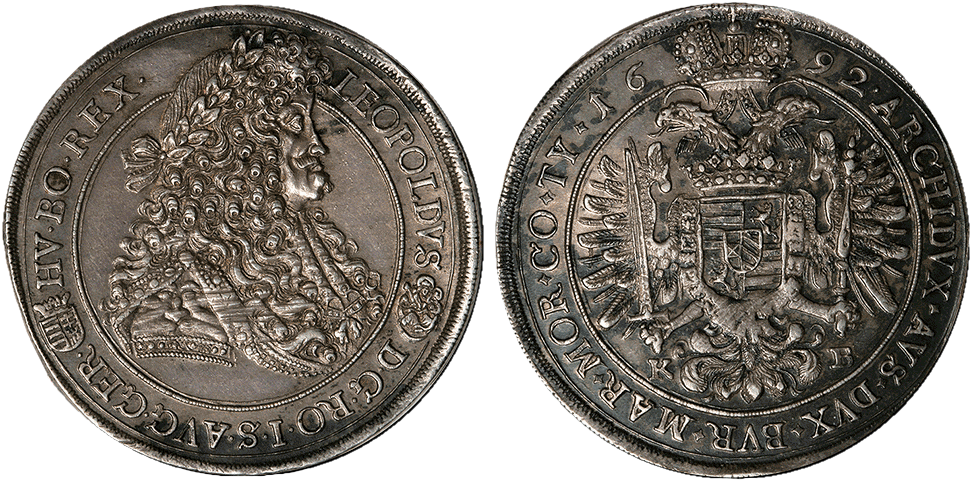
Hungarian Thaler of Leopold I minted in 1692. Latin inscription: Obverse, LEOPOLDVS D[EI] G[RATIA] RO[MANORVM] I[MPERATOR] S[EMPER] AVG[VSTVS] GER[MANIAE] HV[NGARIAE] BO[HEMIAE] REX; Reverse, ARCHIDVX AVS[TRIAE] DVX BVR[GVNDIAE] MAR[CHIO] MOR[AVIAE] CO[MES] TY[ROLIS] 1692, "Leopold, by the grace of God, Emperor of the Romans, Ever Augustus, King of Germany, Hungary and Bohemia; Archduke of Austria, Duke of Burgundy, Margrave of Moravia, Count of Tyrol 1692"

Silver coin of Leopold I, 3 Kreuzer, dated 1670. The Latin inscription reads (obverse): LEOPOLDVS D[EI] G[RATIA] R[OMANORVM] I[MPERATOR] S[EMPER] A[VGVSTVS] G[ERMANIAE] H[VNGARIAE] B[OHEMIAE] REX (reverse):ARCHID[VX] AVS[TRIAE] DVX B[VRGVNDIAE] CO[MES] TYR[OLIS] 1670. In English: "Leopold, by the Grace of God, Emperor of the Romans, always August, King of Germany, Hungary and Bohemia, Archduke of Austria, Duke of Burgundy, Count of Tyrol, 1670."

== Ancestors ==
Ancestors of Leopold I, Holy Roman Emperor

8. Charles II, Archduke of Austria (=14)
4. Ferdinand II, Holy Roman Emperor
9. Maria Anna of Bavaria (= 15)
2. Ferdinand III, Holy Roman Emperor
10. William V, Duke of Bavaria
5. Maria Anna of Bavaria (≠9 & 15)
11. Renata of Lorraine
1. Leopold I, Holy Roman Emperor
12. Philip II, King of Spain
6. Philip III, King of Spain
13. Anna of Austria
3. Maria Anna of Spain
14. Charles II, Archduke of Austria (=8)
7. Margaret of Austria
15. Maria Anna of Bavaria (= 9)

== Male-line family tree ==
House of Habsburg

Original line
Albert; Count of Habsburg c. 1188–1239
Rudolf I of Germany c. 1218–1291
Albert I of Germany; 1255–1308	Hartmann; 1263–1281	Rudolf II; Duke of Austria; 1270–1290
Rudolf I of Bohemia; 1281–1307	Frederick the Fair c. 1289–1330	Leopold I Duke of Austria; 1290–1326	Albert II; Duke of Austria; 1298–1358	Henry the Friendly; 1299–1327	Otto; Duke of Austria; 1301–1339	John; Parricida c. 1290–1312/1313
Albertinian line	Leopoldian line
Rudolf IV; Duke of Austria; 1339–1365	Frederick III; 1347–1362	Albert III; Duke of Austria; 1349–1395	Leopold III; Duke of Austria; 1351–1386	Frederick II; Duke of Austria; 1327–1344	Leopold II; Duke of Austria; 1328–1344
Albert IV; Duke of Austria; 1377–1404	William; Duke of Austria c. 1370–1406	Leopold IV; Duke of Austria; 1371–1411	Ernest; Duke of Austria; 1377–1424	Frederick IV; Duke of Austria; 1382–1439
Albert II of Germany; 1397–1439	Frederick III; HRE; 1415–1493	Albert VI; Archduke of Austria; 1418–1463	Sigismund; Archduke of Austria; 1427–1496
Ladislaus the Posthumous; 1440–1457	Maximilian I HRE; 1459–1519
Philip I of Castile; 1478–1506
Spanish / Iberian line	Austrian / HRE line
Charles V HRE; 1500–1558	Ferdinand I HRE; 1503–1564
Philip II of Spain; 1527–1598	Maximilian II; HRE; 1527–1576	Ferdinand II; Archduke of Austria; 1529–1595	Charles II; Archduke of Austria; 1540–1590
Carlos; Prince of Asturias; 1545–1568	Philip III of Spain; 1578–1621	Rudolf II; HRE; 1552–1612	Ernest of Austria; 1553–1595	Matthias; HRE; 1557–1619	Maximilian III; Archduke of Austria; 1558–1618	Albert VII; Archduke of Austria; 1559–1621	Wenceslaus; Archduke of Austria; 1561–1578	Andrew; Margrave of Burgau; 1558–1600	Charles; Margrave of Burgau; 1560–1618	Ferdinand II; HRE; 1578–1637	Maximilian Ernest of Austria; 1583–1616	Leopold V Archduke of Austria; 1586–1632	Charles of Austria; 1590–1624
Philip IV of Spain; 1605–1665	Charles of Austria; 1607–1632	Ferdinand of Austria; 1609–1641	John-Charles of Austria; 1605–1619	Ferdinand III; HRE; 1608–1657	Leopold Wilhelm of Austria; 1614–1662	Ferdinand Charles; Archduke of Austria; 1628–1662	Sigismund Francis; Archduke of Austria; 1630–1665
Balthasar Charles; Prince of Asturias; 1629–1646	Charles II of Spain; 1661–1700	Ferdinand IV; King of the Romans; 1633–1654	Leopold I HRE; 1640–1705	Charles Joseph of Austria; 1649–1664
Joseph I HRE; 1678–1711	Charles VI; HRE; 1685–1740
Lorraine
Maria Theresa; HRE; 1740–1780	Francis I HRE; 1745–1765
Habsburg-Lorraine
Joseph II; HRE; 1765–1790	Leopold II; HRE; 1790–1792
Francis II; HRE; 1792–1806

== See also ==
- German National Academy of Sciences Leopoldina
- Family tree of German monarchs

== Bibliography ==
- Crankshaw, Edward (1971). The Habsburgs: Portrait of a Dynasty. New York: The Viking Press.
- Frey, Linda; Frey, Marsha (1978). "A Question of Empire: Leopold I and the War of Spanish Succession, 1701–1715". Austrian History Yearbook. 14: 56–72. doi:10.1017/s0067237800009061. S2CID 143446372.
- Frey, Linda; Frey, Marsha (1978). "The Latter Years of Leopold I and his Court, 1700–1705: A Pernicious Factionalism". Historian. 40 (3): 479–491. doi:10.1111/j.1540-6563.1978.tb01904.x.
- Frey, Linda; Frey, Marsha (1983). A Question of Empire: Leopold I and the War of Spanish Succession, 1701–1705. New York: Columbia University Press. ISBN 0-88033-038-4.
- Goloubeva, Maria (2000). The Glorification of Emperor Leopold I in Image, Spectacle and Text. Mainz: Leibniz-Institut für Europäische Geschichte. Abteilung für Universalgeschichte, 184
- Kampmann, Christoph (2012). "The English Crisis, Emperor Leopold, and the Origins of the Dutch Intervention in 1688". The Historical Journal. 55 (2): 521–532. doi:10.1017/S0018246X1200012X. S2CID 162523435.
- Mckay, Derek (1997). Oresko, Robert; Gibbs, G. C. (eds.). Small Power Diplomacy in the age of Louis XIV in Royal and Republican Sovereignty: Essays in Memory of Ragnhild Hatton. Cambridge University Press. ISBN 978-0521419109.
- O'Connor, John T. (1978). Negotiator out of Season. Athens, GA: University of Georgia Press. ISBN 0-8203-0436-0.
- Spielman, John Philip (1977). Leopold I. London: Thames & Hudson. ISBN 978-0-500-87005-1.

Leopold I, Holy Roman Emperor Habsburg Born: 9 June 1640 Died: 5 May 1705
Regnal titles
Vacant Title last held by Ferdinand III, Holy Roman Emperor	Holy Roman Emperor; King of the Romans; 1658 – 1705	Succeeded by Joseph I, Holy Roman Emperor
Preceded by Ferdinand III, Holy Roman Emperor	King of Hungary; 1655 – 1705 with Ferdinand III, Holy Roman Emperor (1655 – 1657)	Succeeded by Joseph I, Holy Roman Emperor
Preceded by Ferdinand III, Holy Roman Emperor	King of Bohemia; 1656 – 1705 with Ferdinand III, Holy Roman Emperor (1656 – 1657)	Succeeded by Joseph I, Holy Roman Emperor
Preceded by Ferdinand III, Holy Roman Emperor	Archduke of Austria; King of Croatia; Duke of Teschen; 1657 – 1705	Succeeded by Joseph I, Holy Roman Emperor
Preceded by Archduke Sigismund Francis of Austria	Archduke of Further Austria; 1665 – 1705	Succeeded by Joseph I, Holy Roman Emperor
Preceded by Michael II Apafi	Prince of Transylvania; 1692 – 1705	Succeeded by Francis II Rákóczi
