= Archduchess Maria Elisabeth of Austria (governor) =

Governor of the Austrian Netherlands from 1725 to 1741

Maria Elisabeth of Austria
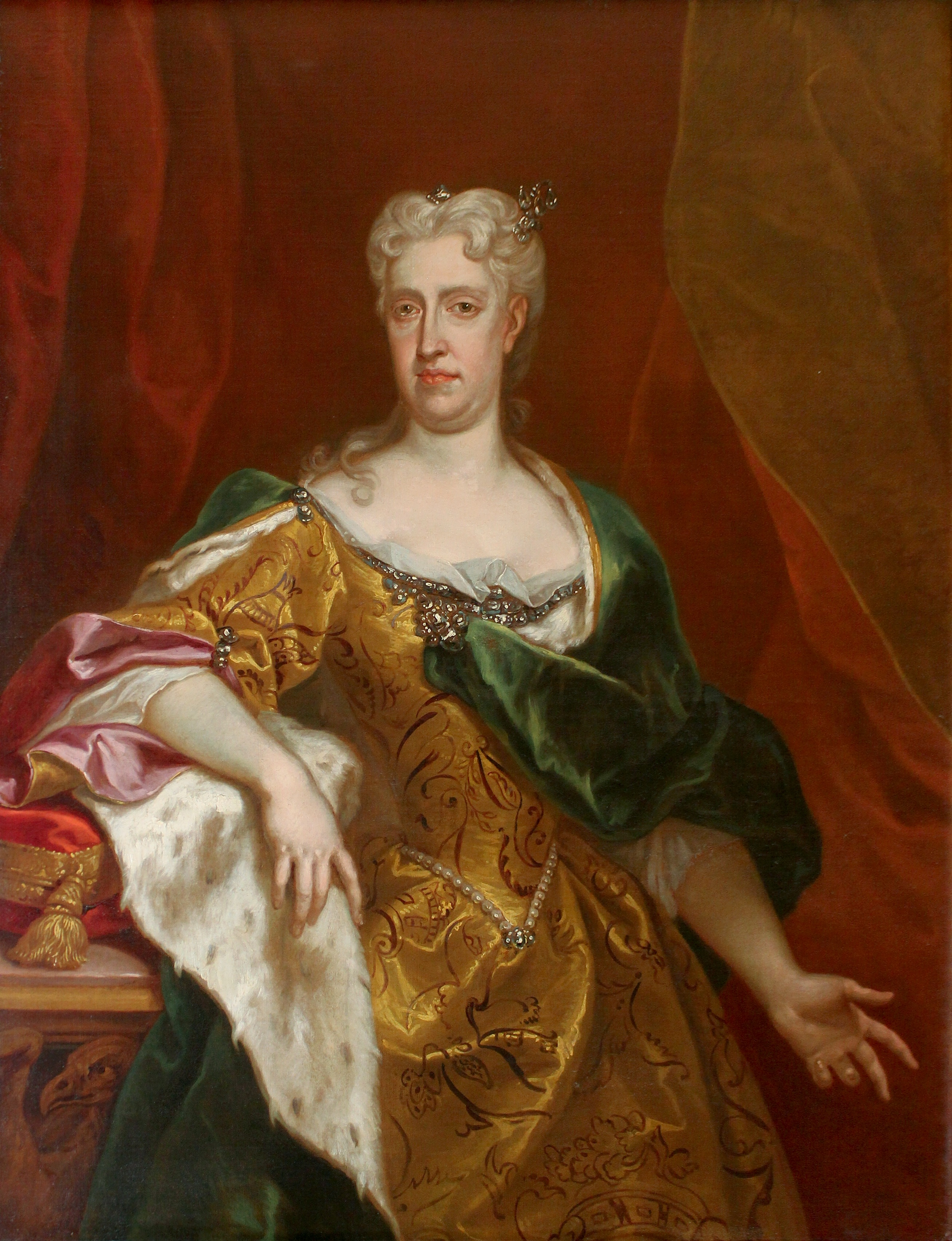
- Portrait by Jan van Orley, c. 1730

Governor of the Austrian Netherlands
- In office Autumn 1725 – 26 August 1741
- Preceded by: Prince Eugene of Savoy
- Succeeded by: Count Friedrich August von Harrach-Rohrau (interim)
- Born: 13 December 1680; Linz, Archduchy of Austria, Holy Roman Empire
- Died: 26 August 1741 (aged 60); Château of Mariemont, Morlanwelz, County of Hainaut, Holy Roman Empire
- Burial: Imperial Crypt, Vienna
- Father: Leopold I, Holy Roman Emperor
- Mother: Eleonore Magdalene of Neuburg

Archduchess Maria Elisabeth of Austria (13 December 1680 in Linz – 26 August 1741 in Mariemont, Morlanwelz), was the governor of the Austrian Netherlands between 1725 and 1741.

== Life ==
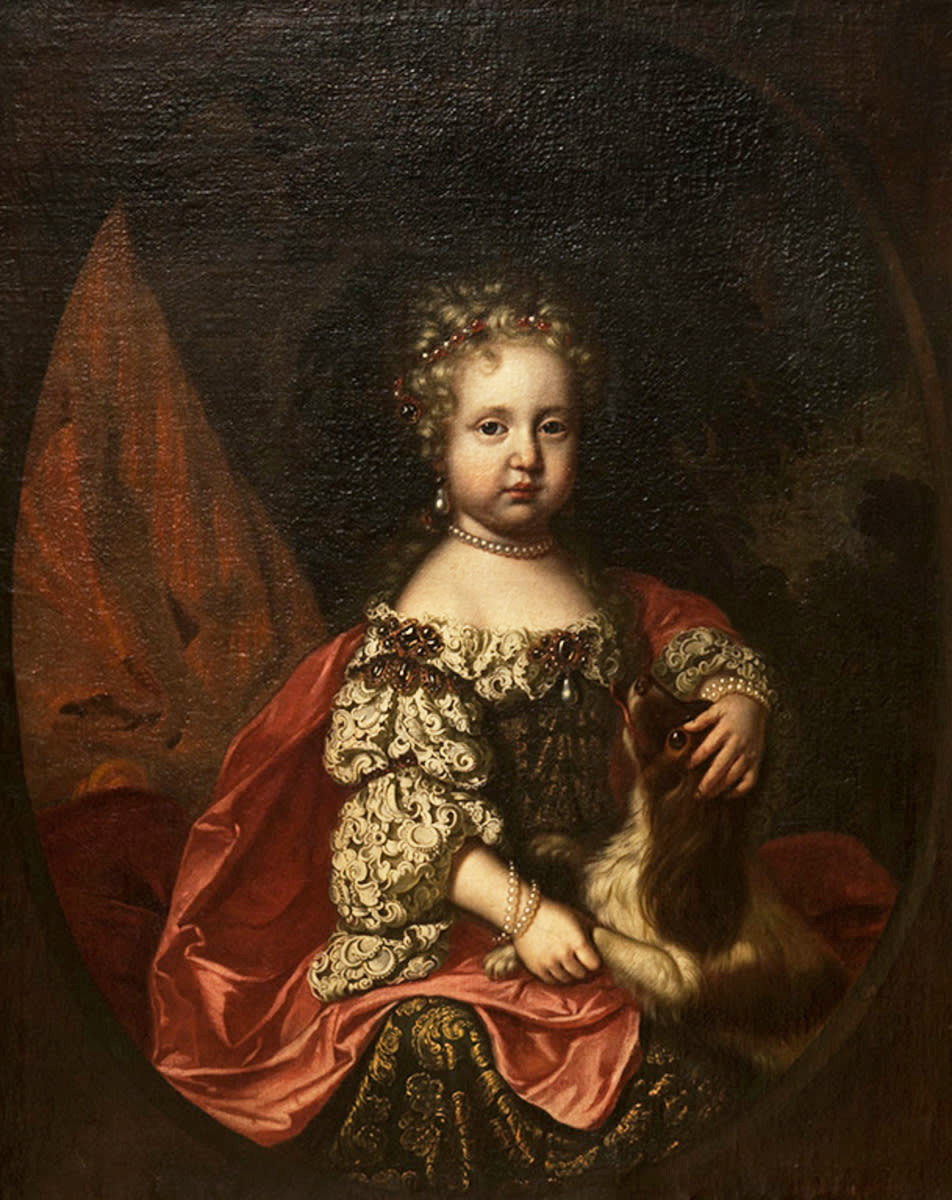
Maria Elisabeth, c. 1685

Maria Elisabeth was a daughter of Emperor Leopold I and Eleonore-Magdalena of Pfalz-Neuburg. She was well educated and fluent in Latin, German, French and Italian.

She never married.

=== Governor ===
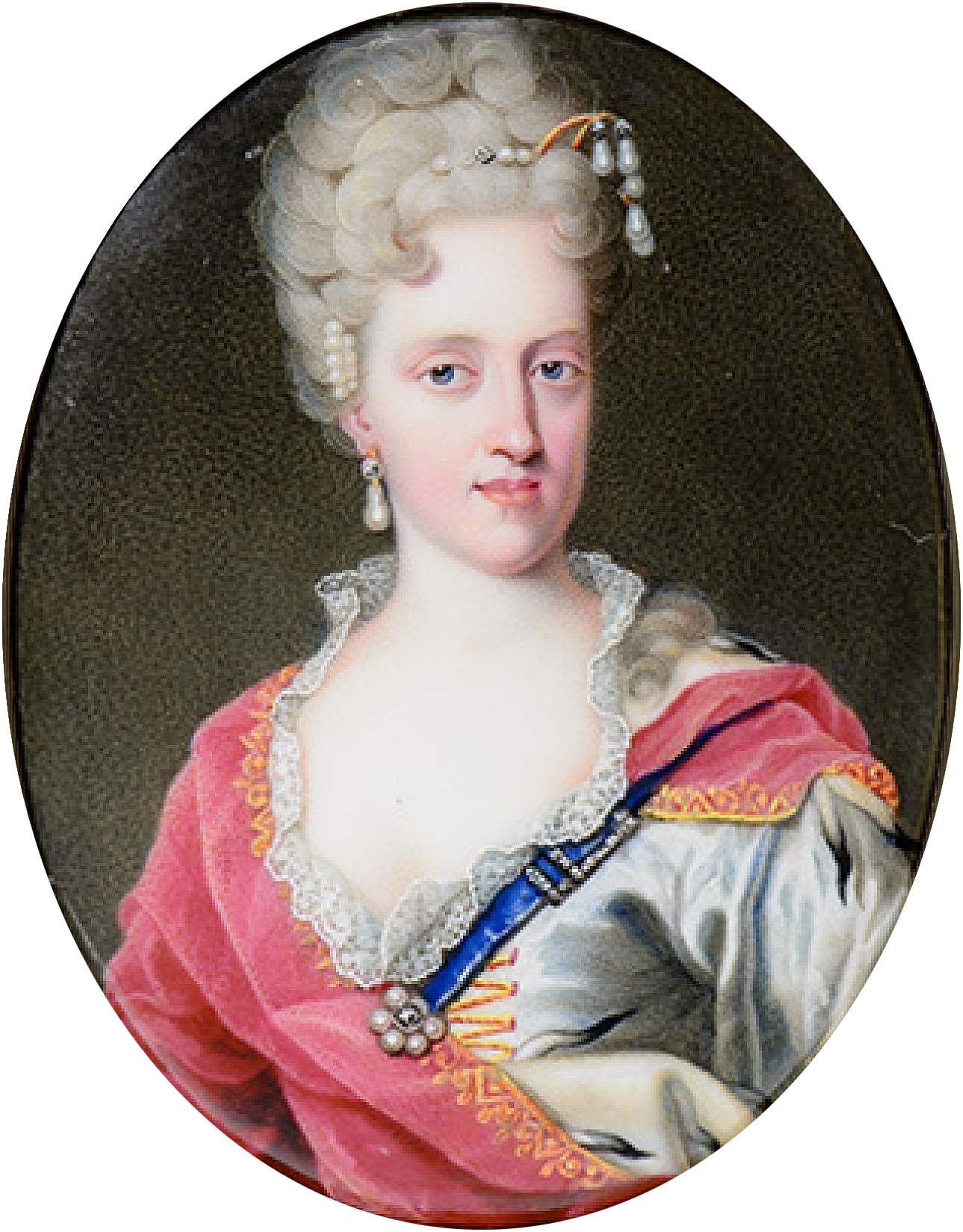
Archduchess Maria Elizabeth by Johann Frederich Ardin, 1712

In 1725, she was appointed Prince Eugene of Savoy's successor as the regent governor of the Austrian Netherlands by her brother, Charles VI, Holy Roman Emperor.

Maria Elisabeth was described as a forceful administrator and a popular regent. Her independent politics, however, were not always appreciated in Vienna. She suspended the Ostend Company in 1727 and closed it in 1731.

She had enough financial means at her disposal to uphold an elaborate court which stimulated culture and music. Among others, she patronized Jean-Joseph Fiocco, her maestro di cappella who dedicated several oratorios to her between 1726 and 1738.

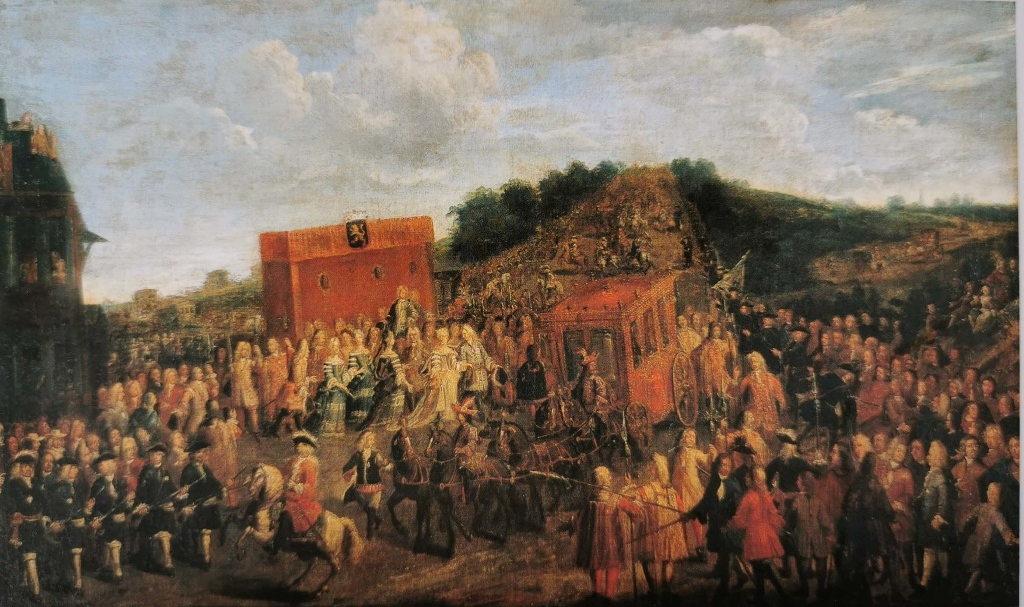
Joyous Entry into Brussels of Archduchess Maria Elisabeth on 9 October 1725 by Andreas Martin

The architect Jean-Andre Anneessens designed the Château of Mariemont for her, where she spent her summers. Also, he renovated the Tervuren castle for her.

=== Death ===
She died unexpectedly at the age of 60, at Mariemont. She was then displayed at a public Lit-de-parade in Brussels 29 August. She was first buried in Brussels, then moved to Vienna in 1749 to the Imperial Crypt next to her brother Charles.

== Ancestors ==
Ancestors of Archduchess Maria Elisabeth of Austria (governor)

16. Charles II, Archduke of Inner Austria (= 22)
8. Ferdinand II, Holy Roman Emperor
17. Maria Anna of Bavaria (= 23, ≠9)
4. Ferdinand III, Holy Roman Emperor
18. William V, Duke of Bavaria (= 26)
9. Maria Anna of Bavaria (≠ 17, 23)
19. Renata of Lorraine (= 27)
2. Leopold I, Holy Roman Emperor
20. Philip II of Spain
10. Philip III of Spain
21. Anna of Austria
5. Maria Anna of Austria
22. Charles II, Archduke of Inner Austria (= 16)
11. Margaret of Austria
23. Maria Anna of Bavaria (= 17, ≠9)
1. Maria Elisabeth of Austria
24. Philip Louis, Count Palatine of Neuburg
12. Wolfgang William, Count Palatine of Neuburg
25. Anna of Cleves
6. Philip William, Elector Palatine
26. William V, Duke of Bavaria (= 18)
13. Magdalene of Bavaria
27. Renata of Lorraine (= 19)
3. Eleonore-Magdalena of Neuburg
28. Louis V, Landgrave of Hesse-Darmstadt
14. George II, Landgrave of Hesse-Darmstadt
29. Magdalene of Brandenburg
7. Elisabeth Amalie of Hesse-Darmstadt
30. John George I, Elector of Saxony
15. Sophia Eleonore of Saxony
31. Magdalene Sibylle of Prussia

Preceded by Count Wirich Philipp von Daun	Governor of the Austrian Netherlands; 1724–1741	Succeeded by Count Friedrich August von Harrach-Rohrau
