= Ducal Crypt, Vienna =

Burial chamber beneath the chancel of Stephansdom in Vienna, Austria

Coordinates: 48.20833°N 16.37278°E

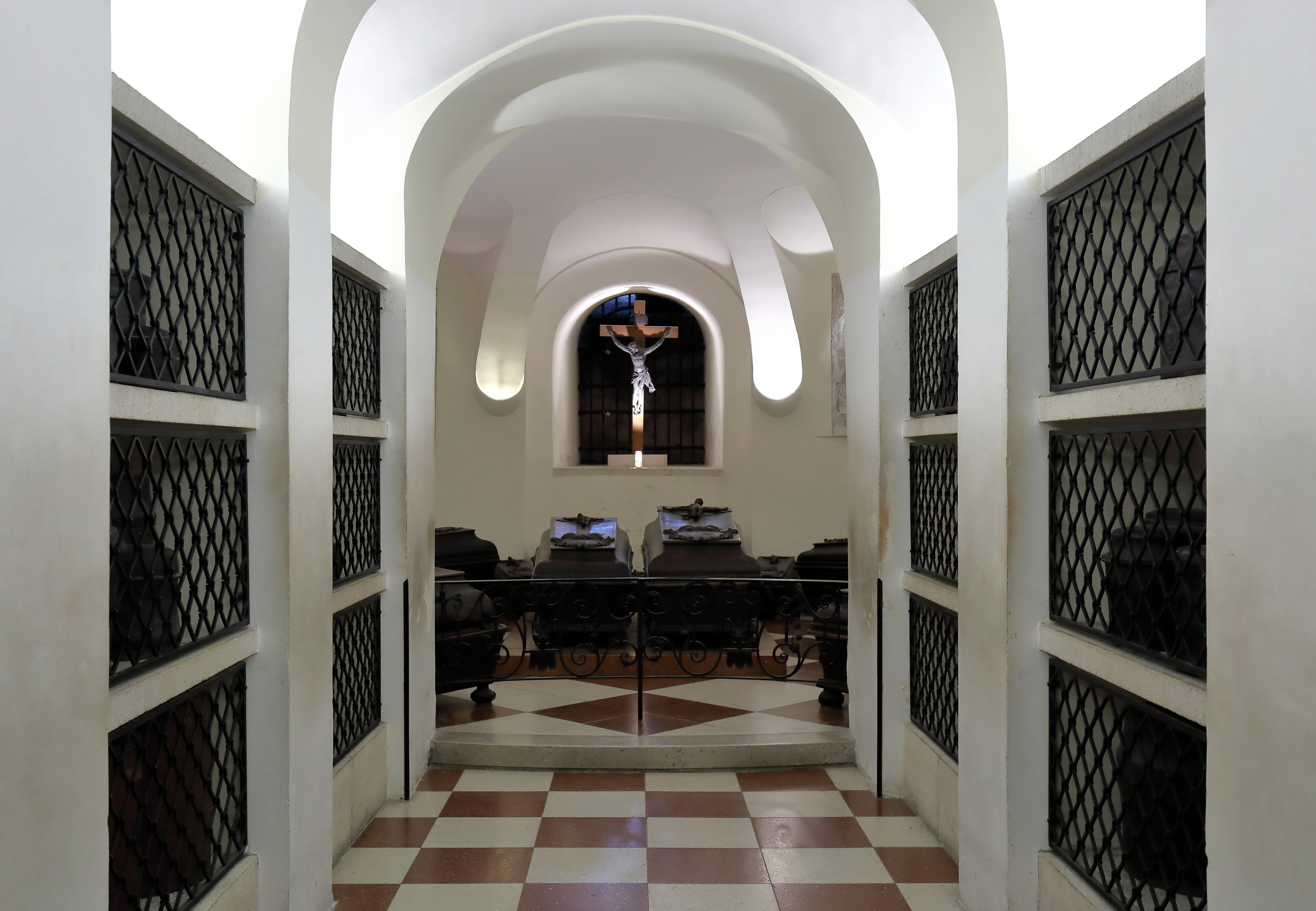
Ducal Crypt

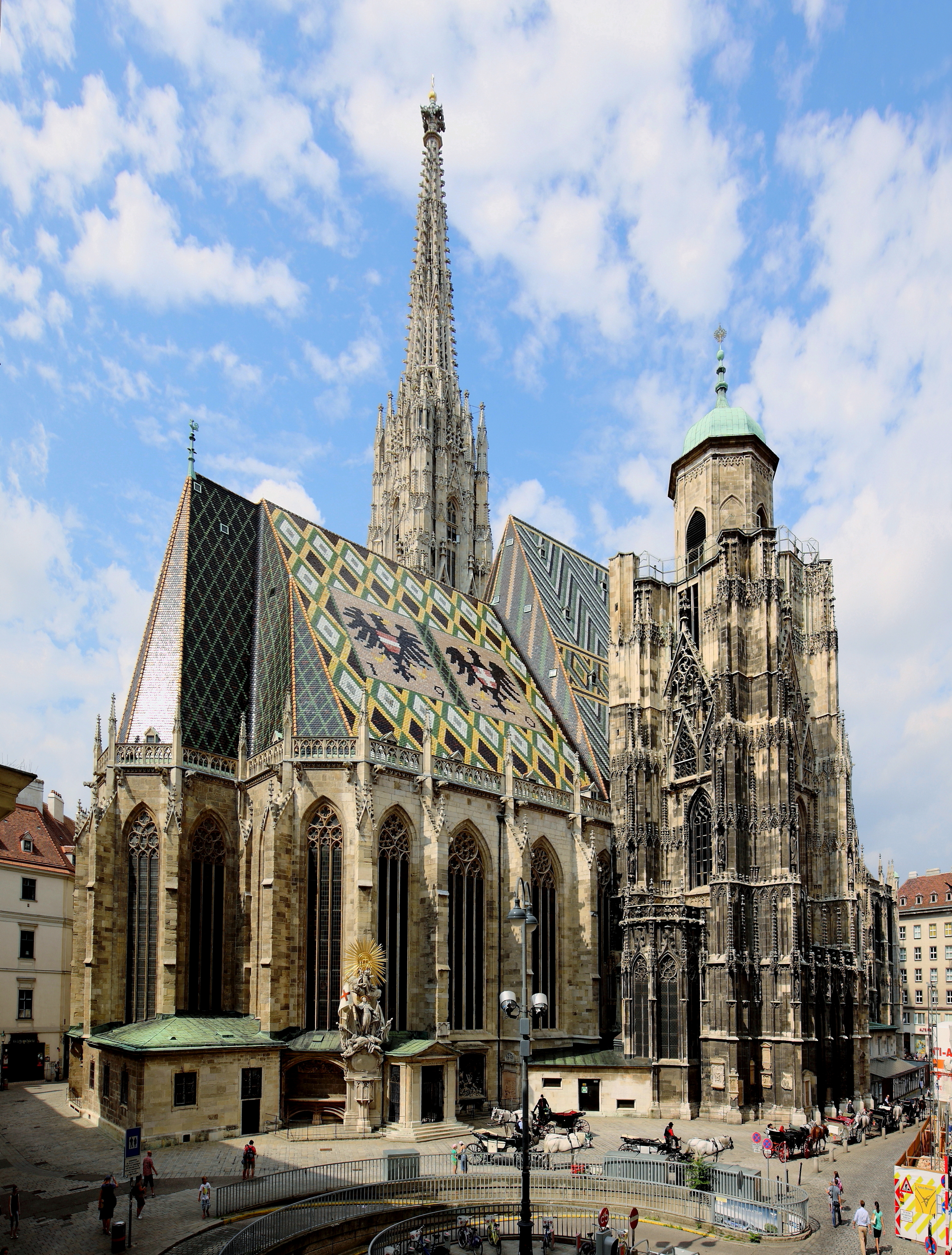
Stephansdom in Vienna, Austria, which houses the Ducal Crypt

The Ducal Crypt (German: Herzogsgruft) is a burial chamber beneath the chancel of Stephansdom in Vienna, Austria. It holds 78 containers with the bodies, hearts, or viscera of 72 members of the House of Habsburg.

== History ==
Before his death at age 25 in 1365, Duke Rudolf IV_{3} had ordered a crypt to be built for his remains in the new cathedral he commissioned, and it has sheltered those remains for over 650 years. He also ordered a cenotaph for himself to be placed upstairs above the crypt, in front of the high altar. That symbolic tomb was later moved to the north choir and his epitaph written in secret symbols was placed on the wall of that choir.

The family of the ruling line of Austrian dukes was buried here after Rudolf IV, but after the dynasty became emperors they were buried in various cities (Vienna was not yet the settled seat of the emperor). After the Imperial Crypt at the Kapuzinerkirche opened in 1633, it became the new dynastic burial place.

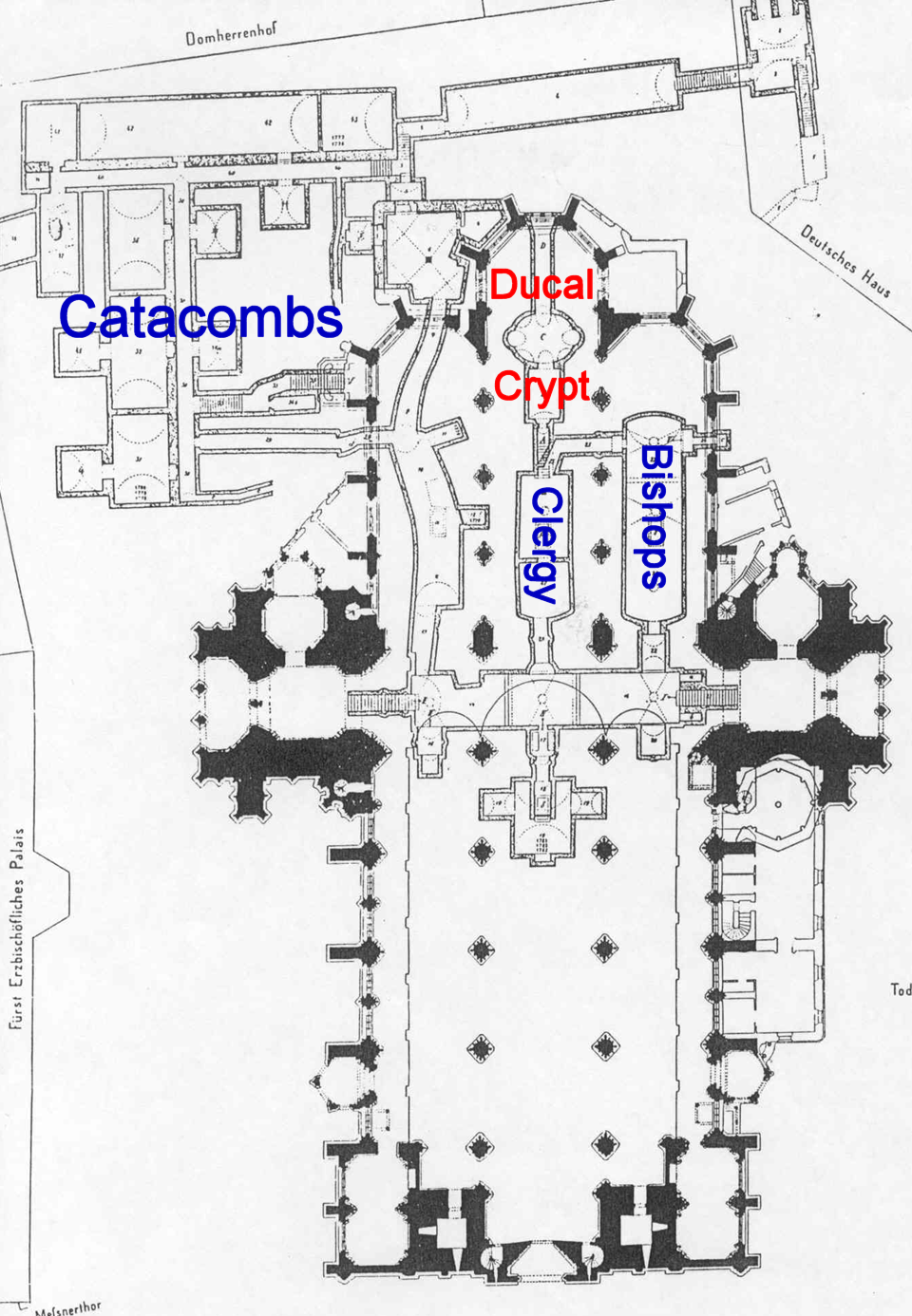
The Ducal Crypt (red letters) is one of several burial locations beneath Stephansdom. The bones of over 11,000 persons from cemeteries formerly around the church are stored in the Catacombs.

Embalmers have known since the time of the Ancient Egyptians that it is necessary to remove the internal organs if the rest of the body is to be preserved. The containers with those organs were usually put in the coffin, but when the heir to the Imperial Throne, King Ferdinand IV of the Romans, died in 1654, he specified in his will that the container with his heart be placed in the Augustinerkirche, his body in the Imperial Crypt in the Kapuzinerkirche, and the urn with his viscera in the crypt at the Stephansdom. His instructions resulted in the foundation of the Herzgruft at the Augustinerkirche. His younger brother, Emperor Leopold I, pursued a tradition imitating that distribution of remains, and also enlarged the Imperial Crypt to make it large enough for additional future burials. The urns with viscera were thereafter regularly deposited in the Ducal Crypt in the Stephansdom. There are now 33 persons who are each buried in all three places.

By 1754, the small rectangular Ducal Crypt was overcrowded with 12 sarcophagi and 39 urns, so the area was expanded with an oval chamber being added (directly beneath the present location of the Archbishop's Throne) beyond the east end of the rectangular one. New sarcophagi were made for some of the bodies.

In 1956 the crypt was renovated and the contents were rearranged. The sarcophagi of Duke Rudolf IV_{3} and his wife_{4} were placed upon a pedestal and the 62 urns containing organs were moved from the two rows of shelves around the new section to cabinets in the original chamber.

Deposition in the crypt has not always been permanent. Emperor Frederick III lay here for only 20 years after his death, until his magnificent tomb upstairs in the south choir was ready. The body of his brother, Archduke Albert VI, was removed after 300 years.

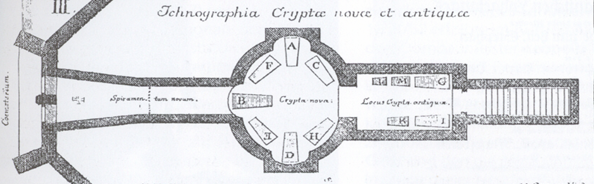
The old and new chambers of the crypt are adjacent, with a tunnel for daylight at the east (left) end, and stairs descending to the crypt's old chamber from the west.

The greatest influx, other that the regular arrival of visceral urns, came as a result of the Austrian version of the Dissolution of the English Monasteries under Emperor Joseph II in 1782. When the religious institutions holding bodies of some of the members of the dynasty were closed, they needed to be moved. The Imperial Crypt at that time had only half the space it has today, and already held 57 bodies. The emperor ordered that the bodies of two persons_{1} _{14} who had died before the Imperial Crypt opened be brought to the Ducal Crypt instead. Another person, Empress Eleanor,_{16} would normally have been entitled to space in the Imperial Crypt, but because her husband_{19} was not buried there either, her body was sent to the Ducal Crypt.

It is probably around this time that the body of Duke Albert VI was removed to make room for others, and that the body_{15} whose sarcophagus is inscribed with only the year and name of the parents arrived. Identified through other evidence as one-year-old Anna of Lorraine, it is known that her brother Charles V, Duke of Lorraine married Archduchess Eleanora Maria Josepha (1653–1697) (widowed Queen of Poland and daughter of Emperor Ferdinand III)_{21} in 1678, and that marriage may have some connection with this non-Habsburg being brought here, but the exact reason is unclear.

The last item interred here is the urn with the viscera of Archduke Franz Karl_{78}, father of Emperor Franz Joseph, in 1878.

== List of persons buried in the Ducal Crypt ==
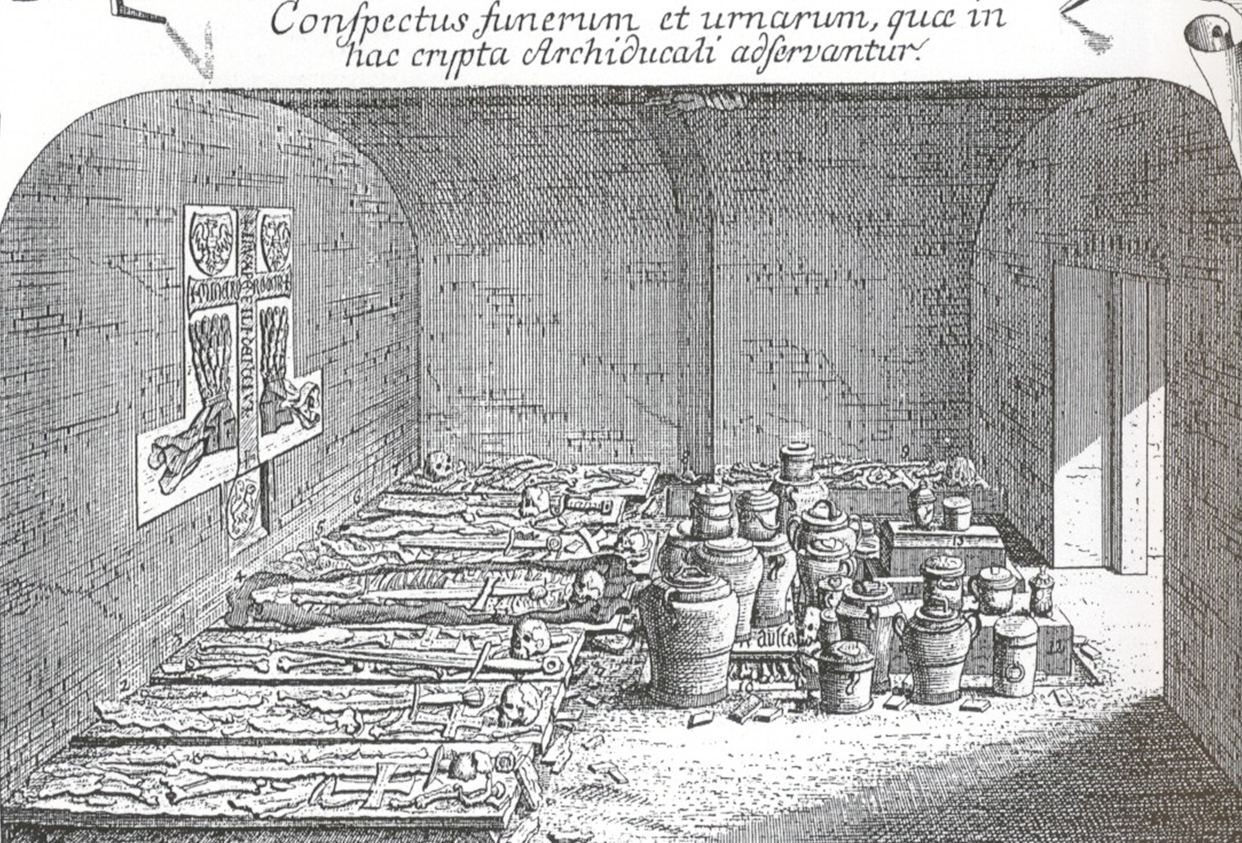
In the Original Crypt, the urns and sarcophagi are shown in disarray in this 1739 engraving. The new chamber was added a dozen years later, connecting through the wall to the left. The cross arrangement engraved in the wall was moved to the new chamber.

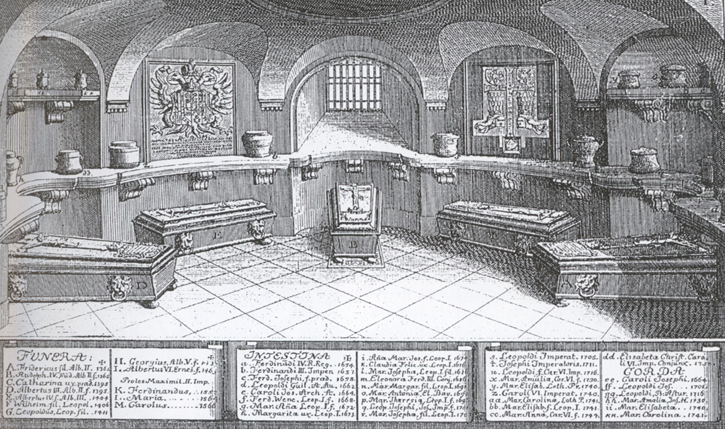
The New Chamber, as shown in this 1758 engraving, is substantially how it looks today. The window behind the sarcophagus of Duke Rudolf IV has a long sill sloping to the ground above to provide light. The urns containing viscera have now been moved to the adjoining Original Chamber.

The Ducal Crypt shelters the bodies of:

- 1 King Frederick III of the Romans (1286–1330)
  "the handsome" son of King Albert I, elder brother of Duke Albert II and uncle of Duke Rudolf IV._{3} His remains were moved here in 1782 when the Carthusian monastery he founded at Mauerbach, his original burial place, was closed during the anti-clerical reforms of Emperor Joseph II.
- 2 Duke Friedrich III of Austria (1347–1362)
  second son of Duke Albert II and the 15-year-old brother of Rudolf IV._{3}
- 3 Duke Rudolf IV (1339–1365)
  "the founder", eldest son of Duke Albert II. Rudolf commissioned the present cathedral, and founded the University of Vienna before his death in Milan at age 25. He was originally entombed in S. Giovanni in Concha and later moved to here. The University lays a wreath on his tomb every 12 March to commemorate its founding by him.
- 4 Duchess Katharine of Bohemia (19 August 1342 - 26 April 1395)
  wife of Rudolf IV_{3} and daughter of Emperor Charles IV. After the death of Rudolf she married Otto V, Duke of Bavaria.
- 5 Duke Albert III (1349–1395)
  "with the pigtail", third son of Duke Albert II and younger brother of Rudolf IV._{3} Died at age 46.
- 6 Duke Albert IV (1377–1404)
  son of Albert III._{5} Died at age 27.
- 7 Duke Wilhelm (1370–1406)
  oldest son of Rudolf IVs youngest brother, Leopold III.
- 8 Duke Leopold IV (1371–1411)
  "the fat" younger son of Rudolf IVs youngest brother, Leopold III.
- 9 Duke George (1435–1435)
  infant son of Duke Albert V.
- 10 Archduke Albert VI (1418-1463)
  Second son of Duke Ernest the Iron.
- 11 Archduke Karl (1565–1566)
  9-month-old son of Emperor Maximilian II.
- 12 Archduke Ferdinand (1551–1552)
  15-month-old son of Emperor Maximilian II.
- 13 Archduchess Maria (1564–1564)
  one-month-old daughter of Emperor Maximilian II.
- 14 Queen Elisabeth (1554–1592)
  Widow of King Charles IX of France and daughter of Emperor Maximilian II. In 1782 her body was moved here from the convent she had founded.
- 15 Duchess Anna (1645–1646) →Family Tree
  young daughter of Duke Nicholas II, Duke of Lorraine, a former Cardinal.
- 16 Empress Eleanor of Gonzaga (1598–1655)
  second wife of Emperor Ferdinand II._{19} Her remains were moved here in 1782 from the Carmelite convent "Siebenbüchnerinnen" in Vienna that she had founded.

Gated niches in the original chamber (outside the entrance to the previous chamber) protect 62 copper urns containing the viscera (intestines) of various members of the Habsburg dynasty.

- 17 (Viscera of) Empress Anna of Tyrol (4 October 1585–15 December 1618) →Family Tree
  Daughter of Ferdinand II, Duke of Tyrol and wife of her cousin Emperor Matthias_{18} who was 28 years older than her. She provided in her will of 1617 for the establishment of a crypt for her and her husband in a Capuchin's Church to be built in Vienna, and died only one year later, at age 33 after seven years of a childless marriage and is buried in tomb 1 in the Imperial Crypt she founded. Her heart is in urn 1 in the Herzgruft in the Augustinerkirche.

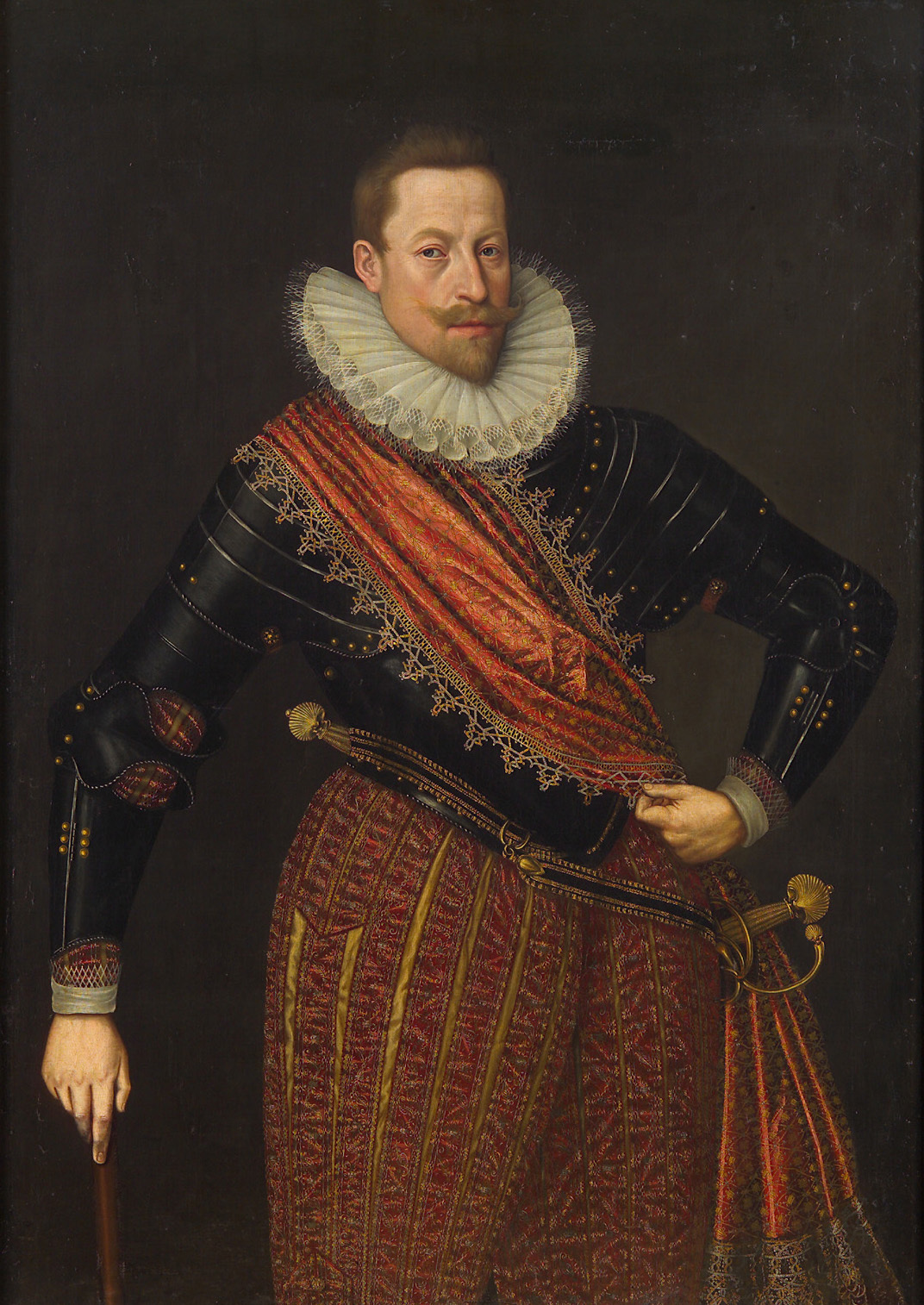
Emperor Matthias is the first emperor whose viscera are deposited here. They were brought to the Ducal Crypt from their original resting place over 20 years later, after the testament of emperor-elect King Ferdinand IV of the Romans had set the precedent for honoring these three churches with the remains of the members of the Imperial Family.

- 18 (Viscera of) Emperor Matthias (1557–1619) →Family Tree
  Third son of Emperor Maximilian II. Once governor of the Austrian Netherlands, he wrested power over Austria, Hungary and Moravia from his inept brother Emperor Rudolf II in 1608 and inherited the rest in 1612. He died, age 62, only three months after his wife Empress Anna._{17} He is buried in tomb 2 in the Imperial Crypt in the Kapuzinerkirche and his heart is in urn 2 in the Herzgruft in the Augustinerkirche.
- 19 (Viscera of) Emperor Ferdinand II (1578–1637) →Family Tree
  Eldest son of Archduke Charles II of Styria. He died at age 62. His heart is in urn 3 in the Herzgruft in the Augustinerkirche and he is buried in the Grazer Dom, Graz.
- 20 (Viscera of) King Ferdinand IV of the Romans (8 September 1633 - 9 July 1654) →Family Tree
  Eldest son of Emperor Ferdinand III._{21} He died at age 20. His heart is in urn 4 in the Herzgruft in the Augustinerkirche and he is buried in tomb 29 in the Imperial Crypt in the Kapuzinerkirche. He established the tradition of burial of different parts in three separate Vienna churches.
- 21 (Viscera of) Emperor Ferdinand III (13 July 1608 - 2 April 1657) →Family Tree
  Third son of Emperor Ferdinand II._{19} He died during his 49th year and is buried in tomb 27 in the Imperial Crypt in the Kapuzinerkirche.
- 22 (Viscera of) Archduke Ferdinand Josef Alois (1657–1658) →Family Tree
  Infant son of Emperor Ferdinand III._{21} He is buried in tomb 6 in the Imperial Crypt in the Kapuzinerkirche.
- 23 (Viscera of) Archduke Leopold Wilhelm (6 April 1614 - 20 November 1662) →Family Tree
  Son of Emperor Ferdinand II._{19} Named at age 13 to take over his uncle Leopold's renounced see at Halberstaedt (when he became 22, this was confirmed by the Pope) and later became also Bishop of Olomouc, Bishop of Breslau, and Grand Master of the Teutonic Knights. He died at age 48. His heart is in urn 5 in the Herzgruft in the Augustinerkirche and he is buried in tomb 115 in the Imperial Crypt in the Kapuzinerkirche.
- 24 (Viscera of) Archduke Karl Joseph (7 August 1649 - 27 January 1664) →Family Tree
  Son of Emperor Ferdinand III_{21} and Empress Maria Leopoldina, who died during his birth. Bishop of Olomouc and Grand Master of the Teutonic Knights at age 13 as heir to his uncle, Archduke Leopold Wilhelm._{23} The art collection he inherited from Archduke Leopold Wilhelm_{23} became the foundation of the Kunsthistorisches Museum. Died at age 15. He is buried in tomb 116 in the Imperial Crypt in the Kapuzinerkirche.
- 25 (Viscera of) Archduke Ferdinand Wenzel Josef (1667–1668) →Family Tree
  Infant son of Emperor Leopold I_{41} and Empress Margarita Teresa._{29} He is buried in tomb 7 in the Imperial Crypt in the Kapuzinerkirche.
  - 26 (Heart of) Archduke Ferdinand Wenzel Josef.
- 27 (Viscera of) Archduke Johann Leopold (1670) →Family Tree
  Infant son of Emperor Leopold I_{41} and Empress Margarita Teresa._{29} He is buried in tomb 8 in the Imperial Crypt in the Kapuzinerkirche.
- 28 (Viscera of) Archduchess Maria Anna Antonie (1672) →Family Tree
  Infant daughter of Emperor Leopold I_{41} and Empress Margarita Teresa._{29} She is buried in tomb 10 in the Imperial Crypt in the Kapuzinerkirche.
- 29 (Viscera of) Empress Margarita Teresa (12 August 1651–12 March 1673) →Family Tree
  Niece and first wife of Emperor Leopold I_{41} at age 15, dead at 22. Her heart is in urn 6 in the Herzgruft in the Augustinerkirche and she is buried in tomb 20 in the Imperial Crypt in the Kapuzinerkirche.
- 30 (Viscera of) Archduchess Anna Maria Sophie (1674) →Family Tree
  Infant daughter of Emperor Leopold I_{41} and Empress Claudia Felicitas._{31} She is buried in tomb 11 in the Imperial Crypt in the Imperial Crypt in the Kapuzinerkirche.
- 31 (Viscera of) Empress Claudia Felicitas (30 May 1653 - 8 April 1676) →Family Tree
  Second wife of Emperor Leopold I._{41} Her 22-year-old body, by her own request, is dressed in the habit of a Dominican nun and is entombed beside her mother in the Dominican Church in Vienna. Her heart is in urn 24 in the Imperial Crypt in the Kapuzinerkirche.
- 32 (Viscera of) Archduchess Maria Josefa Klementina (1675–1676) →Family Tree
  Infant daughter of Emperor Leopold I_{41} and Empress Claudia Felicitas._{31} Her heart is in a gold and silver urn atop her mother's sarcophagus in the Dominican Church. She is buried in tomb 12 in the Imperial Crypt in the Kapuzinerkirche.
- 33 (Viscera of) Empress Eleonora Magdalena of Mantua-Nevers-Gonzaga (18 November 1630 - 6 December 1686) →Family Tree
  Third wife of Emperor Ferdinand III._{21} She was 56 when she died. Her heart is in urn 7 in the Herzgruft in the Augustinerkirche and she is buried in tomb 19 in the Imperial Crypt in the Kapuzinerkirche.
- 34 (Viscera of) Archduchess Maria Margareta (1690–1691) →Family Tree
  Infant daughter of Emperor Leopold I._{41} She is buried in tomb 14 in the Imperial Crypt in the Kapuzinerkirche.
  - 35 (Heart of) Archduchess Maria Margareta
- 36 (Viscera of) Archduchess Maria Antonia (18 January 1669 - 24 December 1692) →Family Tree
  Daughter of Emperor Leopold I._{41} She died at age 23. Her heart is in urn 8 in the Herzgruft in the Augustinerkirche and she is buried in tomb 28 in the Imperial Crypt in the Kapuzinerkirche.
- 37 (Viscera of) Archduchess Maria Theresia (1684–1696) →Family Tree
  Twelve-year-old daughter of Emperor Leopold I._{41} Her heart is in urn 9 in the Herzgruft in the Augustinerkirche and she is buried in tomb 25 in the Imperial Crypt in the Kapuzinerkirche.
- 38 (Viscera of) Archduke Leopold Joseph (1700–1701) →Family Tree
  Infant son of Emperor Joseph I._{42} He is buried in tomb 33 in the Imperial Crypt in the Kapuzinerkirche.
  - 39 (Heart of) Archduke Leopold Joseph
- 40 (Viscera of) Archduchess Maria Josepha (1687–1703) →Family Tree
  Sixteen-year-old daughter of Emperor Leopold I._{41} Her heart is in urn 10 in the Herzgruft in the Augustinerkirche and she is buried in tomb 16 in the Imperial Crypt in the Kapuzinerkirche.

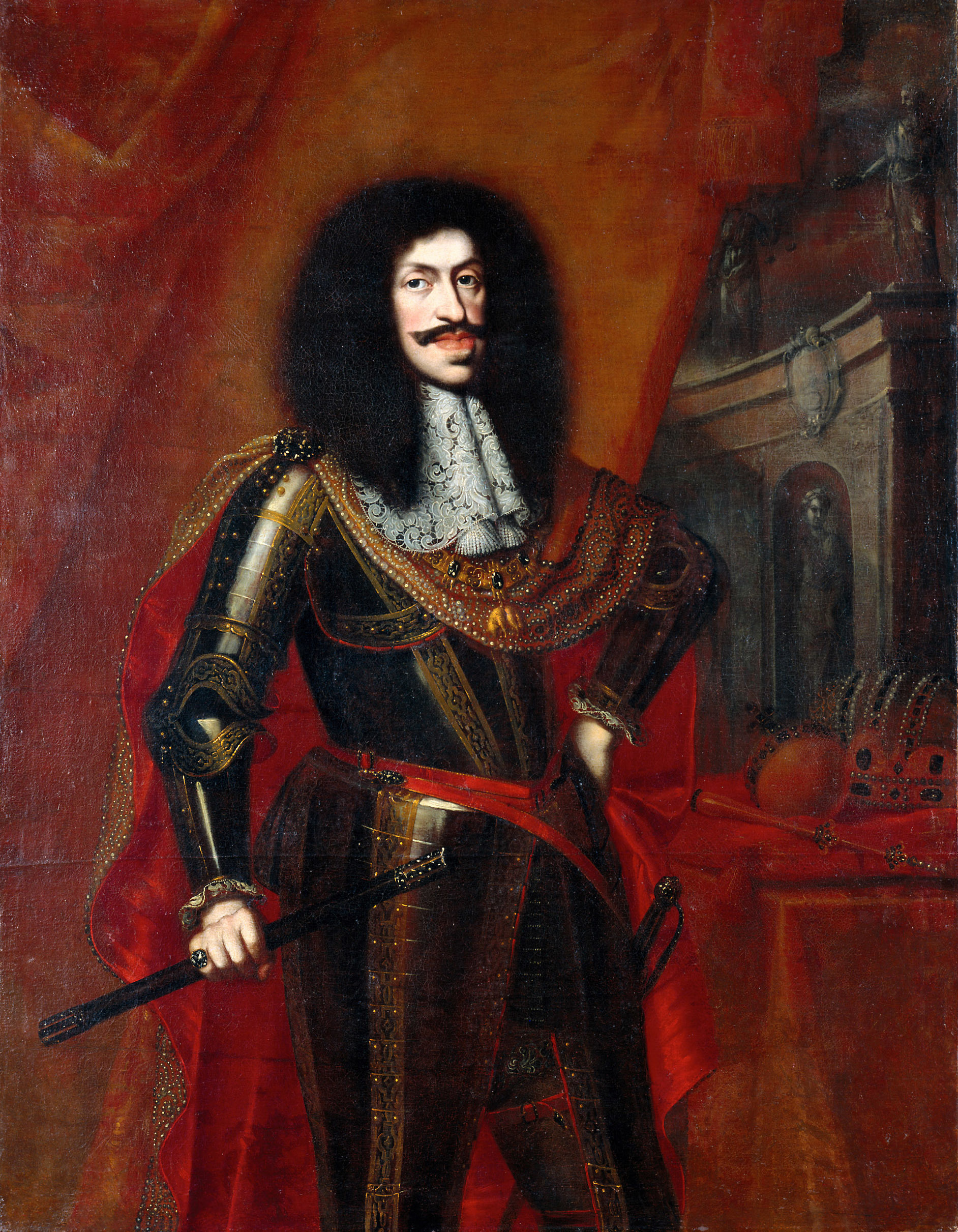
Emperor Leopold I_{41} enlarged the Imperial Crypt at the Kapuzinerkirche and established the tradition of burying members of the Imperial Family in these three churches in Vienna, following the precedent set in 1654 by King Ferdinand IV of the Romans.

- 41 (Viscera of) Emperor Leopold I (9 June 1640 - 5 May 1705) →Family Tree
  Second son of Emperor Ferdinand III_{21} and father of Emperors Joseph I_{42} and Karl VI._{48} He reigned 48 years. He was involved in wars ranging from the defense of western Europe against conquest by the Muslims, to the War of the Spanish Succession to place his second son_{48} on the Spanish throne when the Spanish branch of the Habsburg dynasty died out in 1700. Leopold died at age 64. His heart is in urn 11 in the Herzgruft in the Augustinerkirche and he is buried in tomb 37 in the Imperial Crypt in the Kapuzinerkirche.
- 42 (Viscera of) Emperor Joseph I (1678–1711) →Family Tree
  Son of Emperor Leopold I._{41} He died at age 33 after a short reign of six years. His heart is in urn 12 in the Herzgruft in the Augustinerkirche and he is buried in tomb 35 in the Imperial Crypt in the Kapuzinerkirche.
- 43 (Viscera of) Archduke Leopold Johann (13 April 1716 - 4 November 1716) →Family Tree
  Prince of Asturias. Six-month-old only son of Emperor Karl VI._{48} He is buried in tomb 30 in the Imperial Crypt in the Kapuzinerkirche.
  - 44 (Heart of) Archduke Leopold Johann.
- 45 (Viscera of) Archduchess Maria Amalia (5 April 1724–19 April 1730) →Family Tree
  Six-year-old youngest daughter of Emperor Karl VI._{48} She is buried in tomb 23 in the Imperial Crypt in the Kapuzinerkirche.
- 46 (Viscera of) Archduchess Marie Elisabeth Amalie Antonie Josephe Gabriele Johanna Agathe (February 5, 1737 - June 7, 1740) →Family Tree
  Three-years old, eldest daughter of Emperor Franz I Stephen_{56} and Empress Maria Theresa._{57} She is buried in tomb 48 in the Imperial Crypt in the Kapuzinerkirche.
  - 47 (Heart of) Archduchess Marie Elisabeth.
- 48 (Viscera of) Emperor Karl VI (1 October 1685 - 20 October 1740) →Family Tree
  Younger son of Emperor Leopold I._{41} He died at age 55 after a reign of 29 years. His heart is in urn 13 in the Herzgruft in the Augustinerkirche and he is buried in tomb 40 in the Imperial Crypt in the Kapuzinerkirche.
- 49 (Viscera of) Archduchess Marie Caroline Ernestine Antonie Johanna Josephe (January 12, 1740 - January 25, 1741) →Family Tree
  Third daughter of Emperor Franz I Stephen_{56} and Empress Maria Theresa._{57} Died at age 1 year. She is buried in tomb 53 in the Imperial Crypt in the Kapuzinerkirche.
  - 50 (Heart of) Archduchess Marie Caroline.
- 51 (Viscera of) Archduchess Maria Elisabeth (1680–1741) →Family Tree
  Regent of the Austrian Netherlands. Daughter of Emperor Leopold I._{41} Dead at age 61. Her heart is in urn 14 in the Herzgruft in the Augustinerkirche and she is buried in tomb 38 in the Imperial Crypt in the Kapuzinerkirche. The container here for her viscera is of an unusual form, being a flat box instead of the more usual pot shape.
- 52 (Viscera of) Archduchess Maria Anna (14 September 1718–16 December 1744) →Family Tree
  26-year-old daughter of Emperor Karl VI._{48} Her heart is in urn 15 in the Herzgruft in the Augustinerkirche and she is buried in tomb 39 in the Imperial Crypt in the Kapuzinerkirche.
- 53 (Viscera of) Empress Elisabeth Christina of Braunschweig-Wolfenbüttel (28 August 1691 - 21 December 1750) →Family Tree
  Wife (1708) of Emperor Karl VI_{48} and mother of Empress Maria Theresa._{57} Died at age 59. Her heart is in urn 17 in the Herzgruft in the Augustinerkirche and she is buried in tomb 36 in the Imperial Crypt in the Kapuzinerkirche.
- 54 (Viscera of) Archduke Karl Joseph Emanuel Johann Nepomuck Anton Prokop (1 February 1745–18 January 1761) →Family Tree
  Second son of Emperor Franz I Stephen_{56} and Empress Maria Theresa._{57} Died of smallpox at age 15. His heart is in urn 18 in the Herzgruft in the Augustinerkirche and he is buried in tomb 44 in the Imperial Crypt in the Kapuzinerkirche.
- 55 (Viscera of) Archduchess Marie Johanna Gabriele Josephe Antonie (4 February 1750 - 23 December 1762 →Family Tree
  Eighth daughter of Emperor Franz I Stephen_{56} and Empress Maria Theresa._{57} Died of smallpox at age 12. Her heart is in urn 19 in the Herzgruft in the Augustinerkirche and she is buried in tomb 45 in the Imperial Crypt in the Kapuzinerkirche.
- 56 (Viscera of) Emperor Franz I Stephen (Lunéville 8 December 1708 - Innsbruck 18 August 1765) →Family Tree
  Duke of Lorraine and Grand Duke of Tuscany. Husband of Empress Maria Theresa,_{57} he died at age 56 after nominally being Emperor for 25 years. His heart is in urn 20 in the Herzgruft in the Augustinerkirche and he is buried in tomb 55 in the Imperial Crypt in the Kapuzinerkirche.
- 57 (Viscera of) Empress Maria Theresa (13 May 1717 - 29 November 1780)
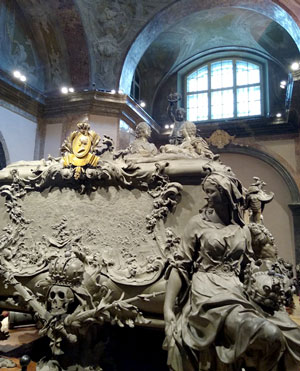
  Maria Theresa Capuchin Crypt
  →Family Tree
  Eldest surviving descendant of Emperor Karl VI,_{48}→Family Tree her ascension was contested and officially the crown of the Empire went to her husband (1736) Emperor Franz I Stephen._{56} but she held Hungary and Bohemia as Queen in her own right. Dying at age 63, her forty years' reign is thought of by the Austrians as the British think of Queen Victoria: the golden years of power, prestige and empire. Her heart is in urn 21 in the Herzgruft in the Augustinerkirche and she is buried in tomb 56 in the Imperial Crypt in the Kapuzinerkirche.
- 58 (Viscera of) Archduchess Louise Elisabeth (Vienna 18 February 1790 - Vienna 24 June 1791) →Family Tree
  Infant first daughter of Emperor Franz II and Empress Maria Theresia._{70} Her heart is in urn 22 in the Herzgruft in the Augustinerkirche and she is buried in tomb 66 in the Imperial Crypt in the Kapuzinerkirche.

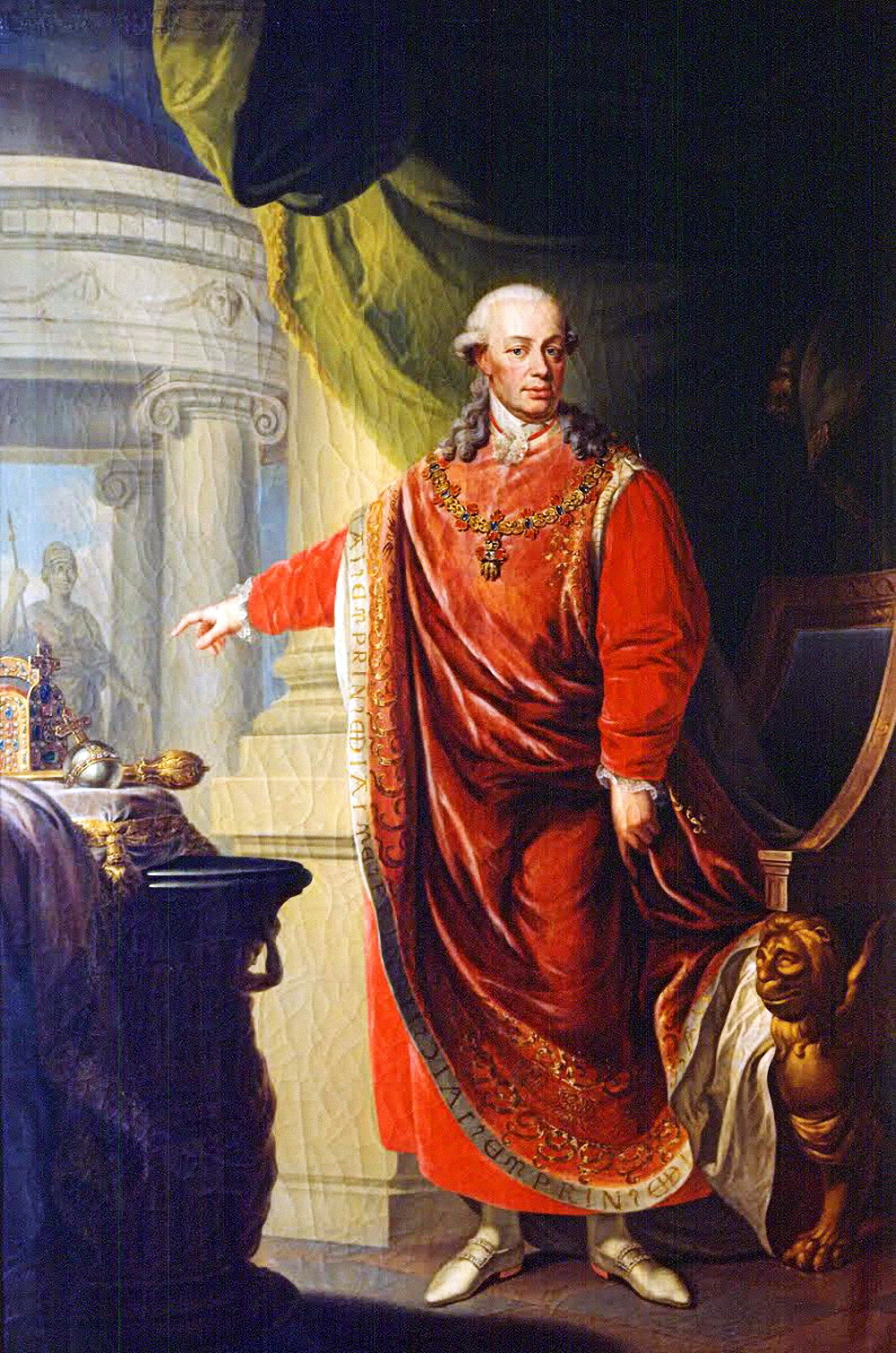
Emperor Leopold II spent little time in Vienna even during his two-year reign, but is now buried in three different Viennese churches.

- 59 (Viscera of) Emperor Leopold II (1747–1792) →Family Tree
  Third son of Empress Maria Theresia._{57} →Family Tree Most of his career was spent in Florence, reforming the governance there as Grand Duke of Tuscany, and only his final two years were as Emperor. He died at age 45. His heart is in urn 23 in the Herzgruft in the Augustinerkirche and he is buried in tomb 113 in the Imperial Crypt in the Kapuzinerkirche.
- 60 (Viscera of) Empress Maria Ludovika (24 November 1745–15 May 1792) →Family Tree
  Originally contracted to marry Empress Maria Theresia's_{57} second son, Archduke Karl Joseph,_{54} his early death diverted her instead to the third son, who later became Emperor Leopold II._{59} In the course of 21 years, she bore her not-always-faithful husband 16 children, among them Emperor Franz II, and Archduke Karl the victor of Aspern. Grieving for her husband, she outlived him by only two months leaving many small children. Her 46-year-old heart is in urn 24 in the Herzgruft in the Augustinerkirche and she is buried in tomb 114 in the Imperial Crypt in the Kapuzinerkirche.
- 61 (Viscera of) Archduchess Maria Karoline Leopoldine Franziska Theresia Josepha Medarde (Vienna 8 June 1794 - Vienna 16 March 1795) →Family Tree
  Infant daughter of Emperor Franz II and Maria Theresia._{70} Her heart is in urn 25 in the Herzgruft in the Augustinerkirche and she is buried in tomb 95 in the Imperial Crypt in the Kapuzinerkirche.
- 62 (Viscera of) Archduke Alexander Leopold Johann Joseph (Poggio Imperiale 14 August 1772 - Laxenburg 12 July 1795) →Family Tree
  Fourth son of Emperor Leopold II_{59} and Empress Maria Ludovika._{60} Palatine of Hungary. Died at 23. His heart is in urn 26 in the Herzgruft in the Augustinerkirche and he is buried in tomb 64 in the Imperial Crypt in the Kapuzinerkirche.
- 63 (Viscera of) Archduchess Maria Christina Johanna Josephe Antonie ("Mimi") (3 May 1742 - 24 June 1798) →Family Tree
  Favorite daughter of Empress Maria Theresia._{57} Wife of Duke Albert of Teschen._{75} The famous and moving monument he erected to her memory is in the Augustinerkirche. She died of Typhus at age 56. Her heart is in urn 28 in the Herzgruft in the Augustinerkirche and she is buried in tomb 112 in the Imperial Crypt in the Kapuzinerkirche.
- 64 (Viscera of) Archduchess Maria Amalia Josephe Johanna Katharina Theresia (Florence 15 October 1780 - Vienna 25 December 1798) →Family Tree
  Daughter of Emperor Leopold II_{59} and Empress Maria Ludovika._{60} Died at 18. Her heart is in urn 27 in the Herzgruft in the Augustinerkirche and she is buried in tomb 65 in the Imperial Crypt in the Kapuzinerkirche.
- 65 (Viscera of) Archduchess Caroline Ludovika Leopoldine (Vienna 9 December 1795 - Schloß Hetzendorf 30 June 1799) →Family Tree
  Fourth daughter of Emperor Franz II and Maria Theresia._{70} Died at 3. Her heart is in urn 29 in the Herzgruft in the Augustinerkirche and she is buried in tomb 87 in the Imperial Crypt in the Kapuzinerkirche.
- 66 (Viscera of) Archduke Maximilian Franz (8 December 1756 - 26 July 1801) →Family Tree
  Youngest son of Empress Maria Theresia._{57} Grand Master of the Teutonic Knights, Bishop of Münster and Elector-Archbishop of Cologne. Died at 45. His heart is in urn 30 in the Herzgruft in the Augustinerkirche and he is buried in tomb 118 in the Imperial Crypt in the Kapuzinerkirche.
- 67 (Viscera of) Archduchess Karoline Ferdinanda (Florence 2 August 1793 - Vienna 5 January 1802) →Family Tree
  Daughter of Ferdinand III, Grand Duke of Tuscany and Luisa Maria Amelia Teresa of Naples._{68} Died at 9. Her heart is in urn 31 in the Herzgruft in the Augustinerkirche and she is buried in tomb 79 in the Imperial Crypt in the Kapuzinerkirche.
- 68 (Viscera of) Grand Duchess Luisa Maria (Naples 27 July 1773 - Vienna 19 September 1802) →Family Tree
  Daughter of Queen Maria Karolina of Naples and Sicily._{73} First wife (1790) of Ferdinand III, Grand Duke of Tuscany →Family Tree. Died in childbirth at 29. Her heart is in urn 32 in the Herzgruft in the Augustinerkirche and she is buried along with her stillborn son in tomb 84 in the Imperial Crypt in the Kapuzinerkirche.
- 69 (Viscera of) Archduke Ferdinand Karl Anton Joseph Johann Stanislaus (1 June 1754 - 24 December 1806) →Family Tree
  Fourth son of Empress Maria Theresia._{57} Governor of Lombardy and, later, the Austrian Netherlands. Founder of the House of Austria-Este. His 52-year-old heart is in urn 34 in the Herzgruft in the Augustinerkirche and he is buried in tomb 105 in the Imperial Crypt in the Kapuzinerkirche.
- 70 (Viscera of) Empress Maria Teresa of Naples and Sicily (Naples 6 June 1772 - Vienna 13 April 1807) →Family Tree
  Second wife (1790) at age 18 of Emperor Franz II. Mother of Empress Maria Louise (second wife of Napoleon), Emperor Ferdinand,_{77} and all subsequent children of her husband. Because her mother_{73} was a sister of her husband's father_{59} the couple were first cousins. →Family Tree (ancestors) She died at age 34 of tuberculous pleurisy. Her heart is in urn 35 in the Herzgruft in the Augustinerkirche and she is buried in tomb 60 in the Imperial Crypt in the Kapuzinerkirche.
- 71 (Viscera of) Archduke Joseph Franz Leopold (Vienna 9 April 1799 - Laxenburg 30 June 1807) →Family Tree
  Second son of Emperor Franz II and Empress Maria Theresia._{70} Died at 18. His heart is in urn 36 in the Herzgruft in the Augustinerkirche and he is buried in tomb 69 in the Imperial Crypt in the Kapuzinerkirche.
- 72 (Viscera of) Archduke Johann Nepomuk Karl (Vienna 29 August 1805 - Vienna 19 February 1809) →Family Tree
  Fourth son of Emperor Franz II and Empress Maria Theresia._{70} Died at 4. His heart is in urn 37 in the Herzgruft in the Augustinerkirche and he is buried in tomb 71 in the Imperial Crypt in the Kapuzinerkirche.
- 73 (Viscera of) Queen Maria Karolina of Naples and Sicily 1752–1814) →Family Tree
  Daughter of Empress Maria Theresia._{57} Wife of King Ferdinand I of the Two Sicilies. Her heart is in urn 38 in the Herzgruft in the Augustinerkirche and she is buried in tomb 107 in the Imperial Crypt in the Kapuzinerkirche.

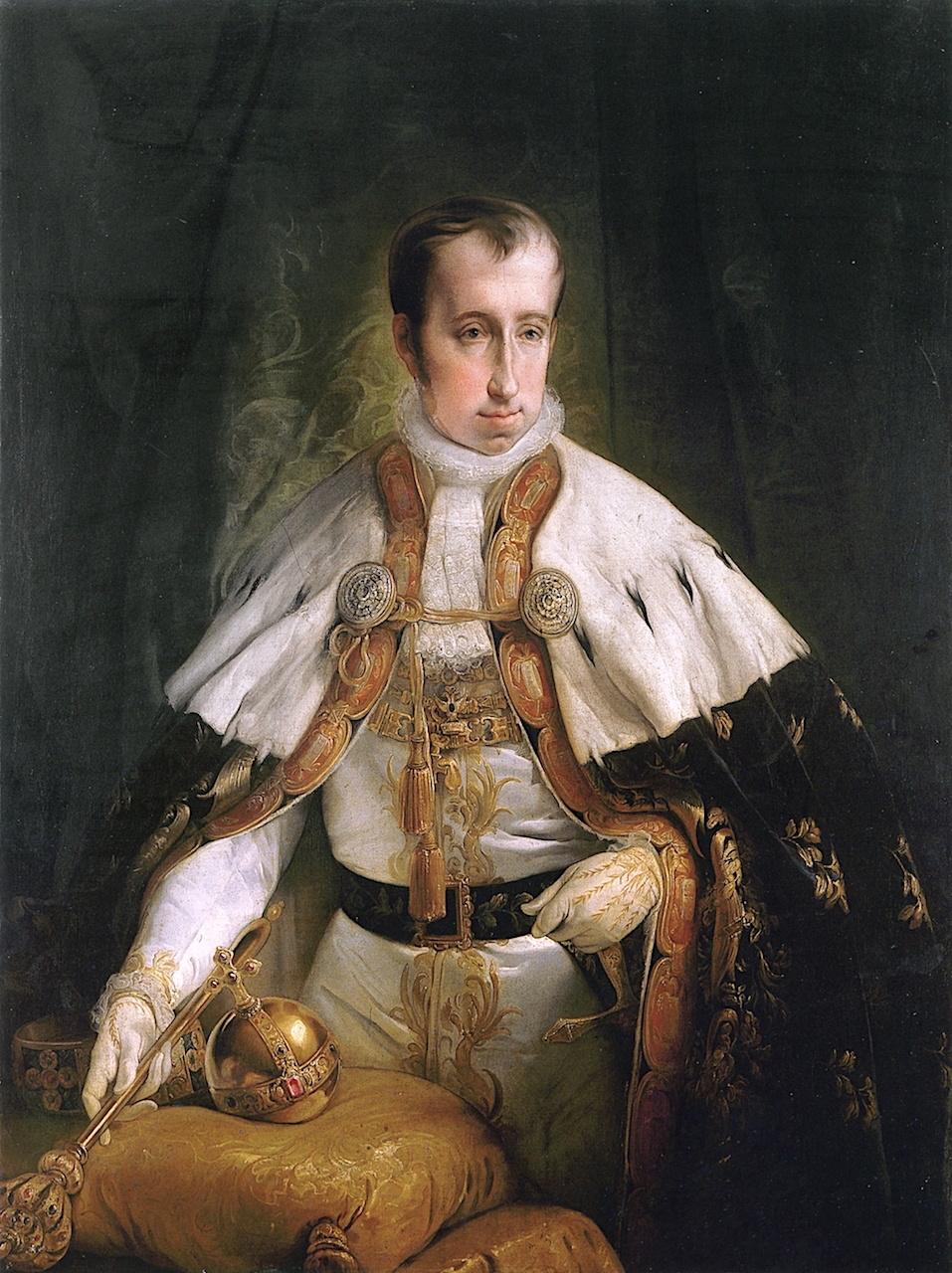
Emperor Ferdinand,_{77} painted at age 40, is the last emperor to have his viscera deposited in the Ducal Crypt.

- 74 (Viscera of) Empress Maria Ludovika of Austria-Este (Monza 14 December 1787 - Verona 7 April 1816) →Family Tree
  Third wife (1808) at age 20 of 40-year-old cousin Emperor Franz II, she contracted tuberculosis shortly after their wedding, suffering from it for the eight years of marriage before dying at age 28. Her heart is in urn 39 in the Herzgruft in the Augustinerkirche and she is buried in tomb 58 in the Imperial Crypt in the Kapuzinerkirche.
- 75 (Viscera of) Duke Albert of Saxony-Teschen (11 July 1738–10 February 1822) →Family Tree
  Husband of Archduchess Maria Christina._{63} The Albertina museum, in his former palace, is named for him because his collection of paintings formed the nucleus of the museum. The oldest of those represented here, he died at age 84. His heart is in urn 40 in the Herzgruft in the Augustinerkirche and he is buried in tomb 111 in the Imperial Crypt in the Kapuzinerkirche.
- 76 (Viscera of) Prince Franz Joseph Karl, Duke of Reichstadt (1811–1832) →Family Tree
  Twenty-one-year-old son of Napoléon Bonaparte and Empress Maria Louise (daughter of Emperor Franz II.) His heart is in urn 42 in the Herzgruft in the Augustinerkirche. His body was originally buried in the Imperial Crypt in the Kapuzinerkirche but in 1940, on the orders of Adolf Hitler, it was moved to Les Invalides in Paris to rest with his father's.
- 77 (Viscera of) Emperor Ferdinand I of Austria (1793–1875) →Family Tree
  First son of Emperor Franz II. Severely epileptic, he abdicated after a nominal reign of 12 years and spent the remainder of his 82-year-long life in Prague. His heart is in urn 53 in the Herzgruft in the Augustinerkirche and he is buried in tomb 62 in the Imperial Crypt in the Kapuzinerkirche.
- 78 (Viscera of) Archduke Franz Karl (1802–1878) →Family Tree
  Third son of Emperor Franz II. When his elder brother Emperor Ferdinand_{77} abdicated in 1848, he stood aside so that his son, Emperor Franz Joseph, could succeed to the throne instead. Great grandfather of the last reigning emperor, Emperor Karl I. Aged 76 when he died, his viscera are the last interred here, and his heart was the last to be placed in the Herzgruft in the Augustinerkirche, where it occupies urn 54. He is buried in tomb 135 in the Imperial Crypt in the Kapuzinerkirche.

== See also ==
- Imperial Crypt
- Herzgruft
