= Maria Luisa of Spain =

Holy Roman Empress from 1790 to 1792

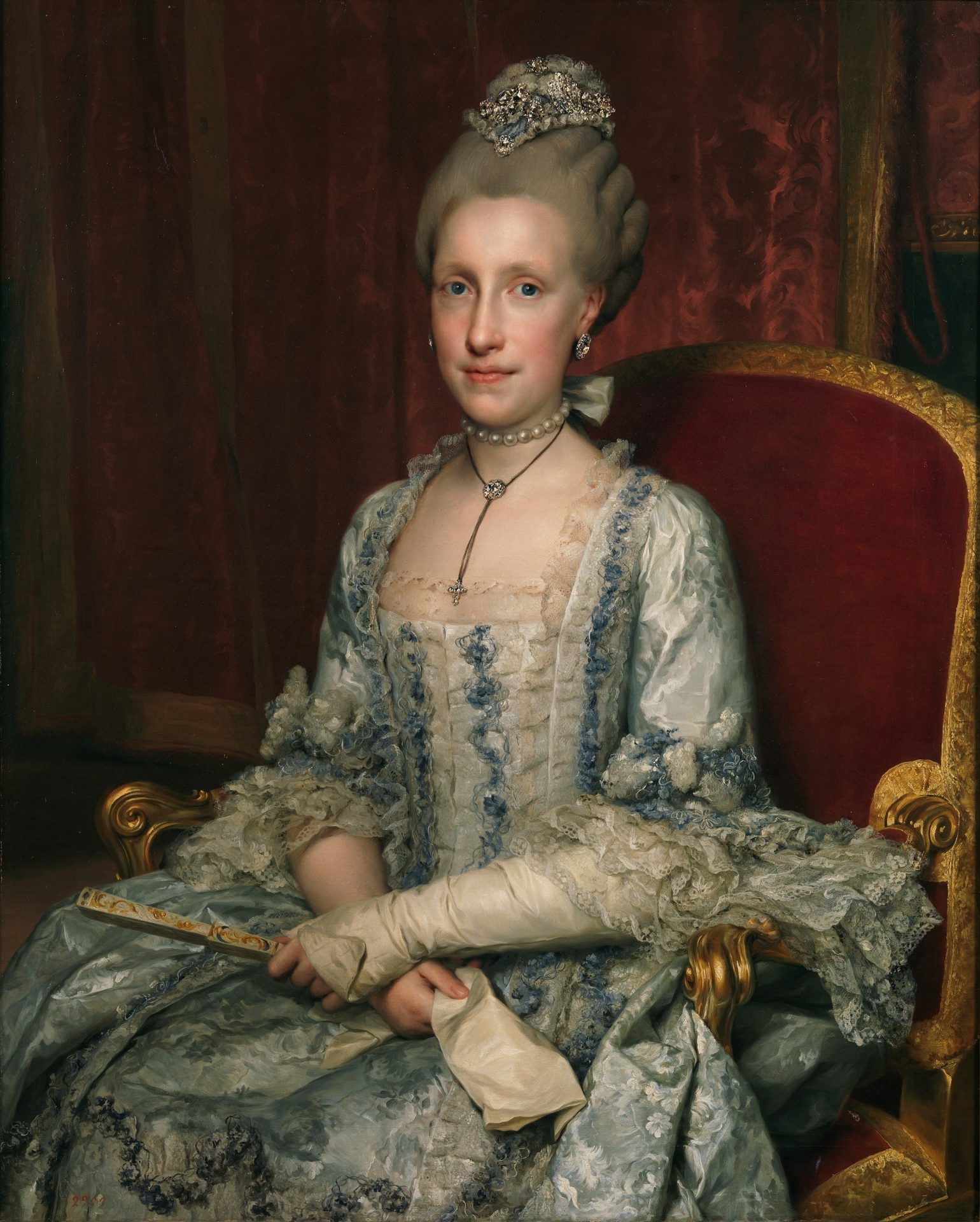
- Portrait by Anton Raphael Mengs, 1770

Holy Roman Empress
- Tenure: 30 September 1790 – 1 March 1792

Grand Duchess consort of Tuscany
- Tenure: 18 August 1765 – 20 February 1790
- Born: 24 November 1745; Palace of Portici, Naples, Kingdom of Naples
- Died: 15 May 1792 (aged 46); Hofburg Palace, Vienna, Archduchy of Austria, Holy Roman Empire
- Burial: Imperial Crypt (body); Herzogsgruft (viscera); Herzgruft (heart)
- Spouse: Leopold II, Holy Roman Emperor (m. 1764; died 1792)
- Issue: Maria Theresa, Queen of Saxony; Francis II, Holy Roman Emperor; Ferdinand III, Grand Duke of Tuscany; Archduchess Maria Anna; Archduke Charles, Duke of Teschen; Archduke Alexander Leopold; Archduke Joseph, Palatine of Hungary; Maria Clementina, Duchess of Calabria; Archduke Anton Victor, Archbishop of Cologne; Archduchess Maria Amalia; Archduke Johann; Archduke Rainer Joseph; Archduke Louis; Archduke Rudolf, Archbishop of Olmütz
Names
- Spanish: María Luisa de Borbón y Sajonia
- House: Bourbon
- Father: Charles III of Spain
- Mother: Maria Amalia of Saxony

Maria Luisa of Spain (Spanish: María Luisa, German: Maria Ludovika; 24 November 1745 – 15 May 1792) was Holy Roman Empress, German Queen, Queen of Hungary and Bohemia, and Grand Duchess of Tuscany as the wife of Leopold II, Holy Roman Emperor.

== Early life ==
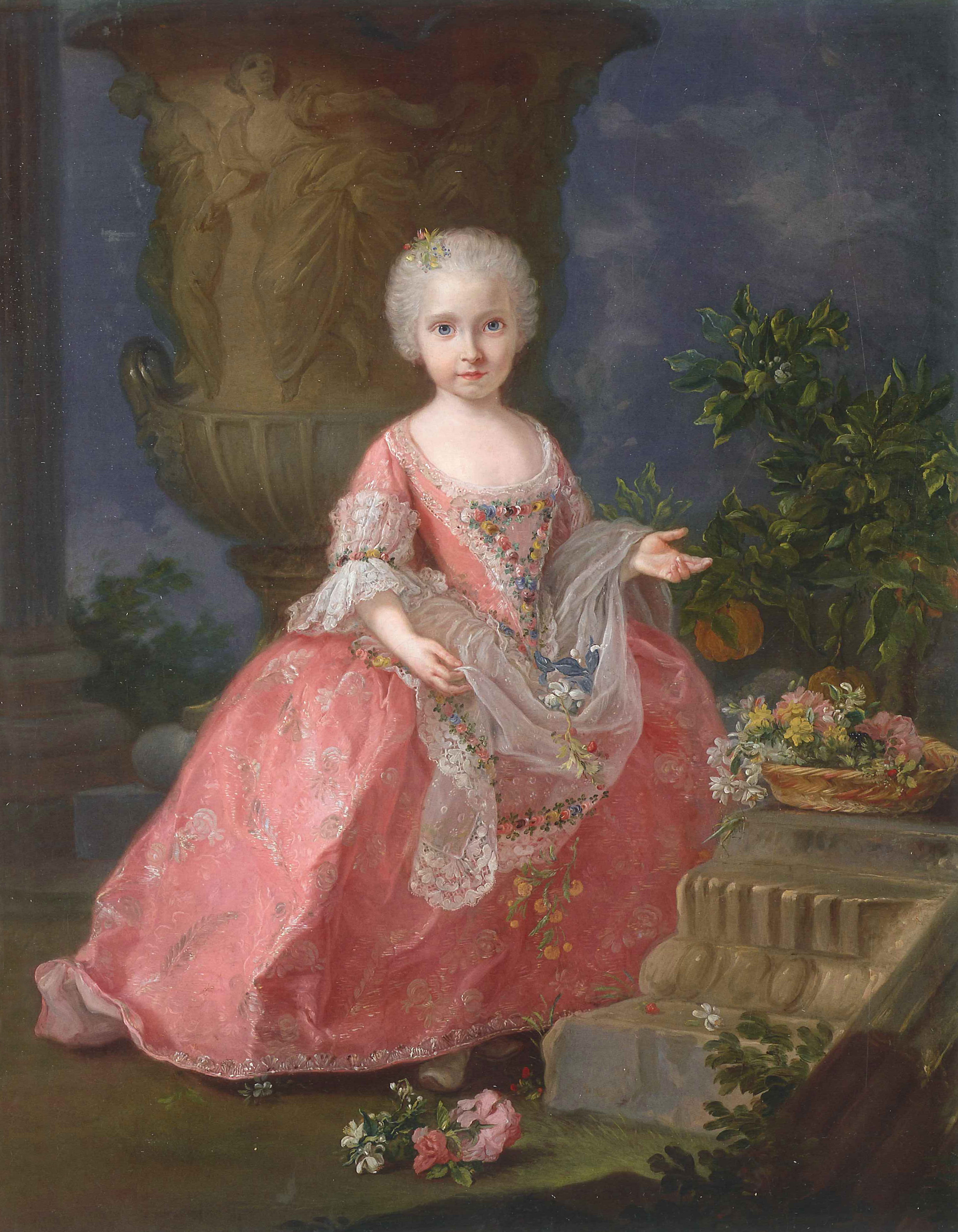
Princess Maria Luisa painted by Giuseppe Bonito, c. 1748

Maria Luisa was born in Portici, in Campania, the site of the summer palace (Reggia di Portici) of her parents, Charles, King of Naples and Sicily, and Maria Amalia of Saxony on 24 November 1745, on her mother's 21st birthday. She was the fifth daughter, and second surviving child, of her parents.

Her father, the future Charles III of Spain, had become King of Naples and Sicily in 1735 after its occupation by the Spanish in the War of Polish Succession. After her father became King of Spain at the death of her half-uncle, Ferdinand VI of Spain, in 1759, she became known as Infanta Maria Luisa of Spain, and she moved with her family to Spain.

== Grand Duchess of Tuscany ==
Maria Luisa at the time of her marriage in 1764 (by Anton Raphael Mengs)

Maria Luisa was originally intended to marry the future Emperor Joseph II, but this was stopped owing to the disapproval of Louis XV of France, who instead wished for Joseph to marry his granddaughter, Isabella of Parma.

On 16 February 1764 she was married by proxy at Madrid to Leopold, the third son of Empress Maria Theresa and Francis II, Grand Duke of Tuscany, and the heir apparent to the Grand Duchy of Tuscany. Before her marriage, she was made to renounce her rights to the throne of Spain by the wishes of her father. After her wedding by proxy, she travelled to Austria by way of Barcelona, Genoa and Bolzano. The next year, on 5 August, she married him in person at Innsbruck. Only a few days later, the death of Emperor Francis made Maria Luisa's husband the new Grand Duke of Tuscany, and the newly married couple moved to Florence, where they would live for the next twenty-five years. The couple arrived in Florence 13 September 1765. They were settled in the Palazzo Pitti.

At the time of her wedding, Maria Luisa was described as a blue-eyed beauty with a vivid charm, unpretentious and simple and with a disposition to be generous and kind, and her natural warm friendliness was said to have contrasted to the somewhat cold nature of Leopold. Through her strict Catholic upbringing, Maria Luisa was raised to endure any hardship of pregnancy and marriage without complaint, a role she fulfilled during her marriage. The relationship between Maria Luisa and Leopold has been described as happy, and Maria Luisa as a supporting and loyal wife. She accepted the infidelities of her spouse without complaint: among his best known lovers were Lady Anna Gore Cowper, and another was the ballerina Livia Raimondi, with whom he had a son, Luigi von Grün (1788–1814), and he gave her her own palace at Piazza San Marco, Florence.

As grand duchess of Tuscany, Maria Luisa made herself appreciated in the first year in Florence, during the famine of 1765, when she provided the poor and needing with food and medical aid, and she was referred to as an ideal "model of feminine virtue". She was never crowned as grand duchess, though she was present at the coronation of Leopold in July 1768. She accompanied her sister-in-law, Maria Carolina of Austria, at the latter's marriage to her brother, King Ferdinand IV of Naples: the couple remained there for the summer of 1768. In 1770, she accompanied Leopold on his visit to Vienna. Neither Maria Luisa nor Leopold enjoyed formal occasions and rarely participated in representation or indeed upheld much of a ceremonial court life at all; while Leopold spent his time with politics and his personal pleasures, Maria Luisa isolated herself almost completely from high society and devoted herself completely to the upbringing of her children. Maria Luisa and her spouse gave their children a very free upbringing, away from any formal court life, and occasionally took them on trips to the countryside and the coast. She remained mostly unknown to the local aristocracy, and restricted her private social life to a very small circle of friends.

== Holy Roman Empress ==
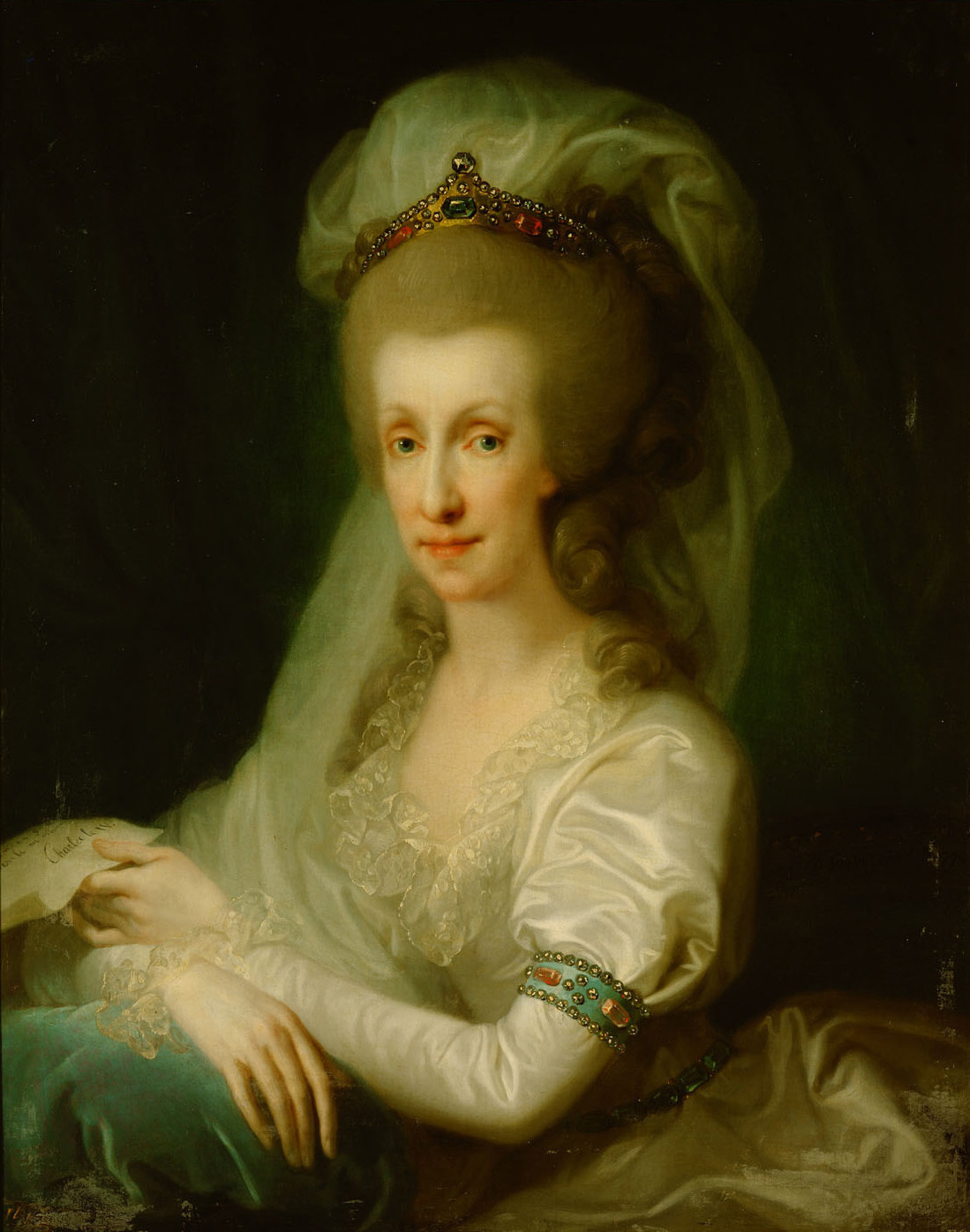
Portrait of Maria Luisa as Holy Roman Empress by Josef Grassi, 1790

In 1790, on the death of Leopold's childless brother, Joseph II, Maria Luisa's husband inherited the Habsburg monarchy in Central Europe, and was shortly thereafter elected Holy Roman Emperor. Taking the name of Leopold II, the new emperor moved his family to Vienna, where Maria Luisa took on the role of imperial consort, being the penultimate Holy Roman Empress and the last to have had held the title until her husband's death. Leopold died scarcely two years later, on 1 March 1792. Maria Luisa followed her husband to the grave in less than three months, not living long enough to see her eldest son Francis elected as the last Holy Roman Emperor. She was buried next to her husband in the Capuchin Crypt. Her urn is located in the Loreto Chapel of the Vienna Augustinerkirche, her entrails in the Ducal Crypt. Maria Luisa is one of those 41 people who received a "Separated Funeral" with a division of the body into all three traditional Viennese burial places of the Habsburgs (Imperial Crypt, Herzgruft, Herzogsgruft).

Mozart's opera La clemenza di Tito was commissioned by the Estates of Bohemia as part of the festivities that accompanied the coronation of Maria Luisa and her husband Leopold as king and queen of Bohemia in Prague on 6 September 1791. In musical circles, Maria Luisa is famous for her putative denigration of Mozart's opera, which she supposedly dismissed as "una porcheria tedesca" (Italian for "German rubbish"), however no claim that she made this remark pre-dates the publication in 1871 of Alfred Meissner's Rococo-Bilder: nach Aufzeichnungen meines Grossvaters, a collection of stories about cultural and political life in Prague in the late eighteenth and early nineteenth centuries.

== Issue ==
Maria Luisa, her husband Grand Duke Leopold I, and their children (by Johan Zoffany, 1776)

1. Maria Theresa of Austria (14 January 1767 – 7 November 1827), married Anton of Saxony and had issue.
2. Francis II, Holy Roman Emperor (12 February 1768 – 2 March 1835), married Duchess Elisabeth of Württemberg and had issue; married Maria Teresa of Naples and Sicily and had issue; married Maria Ludovika of Austria-Este, no issue; married Caroline Augusta of Bavaria, no issue.
3. Ferdinand III, Grand Duke of Tuscany (6 May 1769 – 18 June 1824) married Luisa of Naples and Sicily and had issue; married Princess Maria Ferdinanda of Saxony, no issue.
4. Maria Anna of Austria (22 April 1770 – 1 October 1809), died unmarried.
5. Charles of Austria (5 September 1771 – 30 April 1847) married Princess Henrietta of Nassau-Weilburg and had issue.
6. Alexander Leopold of Austria (14 August 1772 – 12 July 1795) died unmarried.
7. Albrecht Johann Joseph of Austria (19 September 1773 – 22 July 1774), died in infancy.
8. Maximilian of Austria (23 December 1774 – 10 March 1778), died in childhood.
9. Joseph of Austria (9 March 1776 – 13 January 1847), married Grand Duchess Alexandra Pavlovna of Russia and had issue; married Princess Hermine of Anhalt-Bernburg-Schaumburg-Hoym and had issue; married Duchess Maria Dorothea of Württemberg and had issue.
10. Maria Clementina of Austria (24 April 1777 – 15 November 1801) married Francis I of the Two Sicilies and had issue.
11. Anton of Austria (31 August 1779 – 2 April 1835), died unmarried, Grand Master of Teutonic Knights
12. Maria Amalia of Austria (15 October 1780 – 25 December 1798), never married, no issue
13. Johann of Austria (20 January 1782 – 11 May 1859), married Anna Plochl morganatically. His children were created Counts of Meran.
14. Rainer of Austria (30 September 1783 – 16 January 1853), married Princess Elisabeth of Savoy-Carignano and had issue.
15. Louis of Austria (13 December 1784 – 21 December 1864), died unmarried.
16. Rudolph of Austria (8 January 1788 – 24 July 1831), died unmarried.

== Ancestry ==
Ancestors of María Luisa of Spain

8. Louis, Dauphin of France
4. Philip V of Spain
9. Maria Anna Victoria of Bavaria
2. Charles III of Spain
10. Odoardo Farnese, Hereditary Prince of Parma
5. Elisabeth Farnese
11. Dorothea Sophie of Neuburg
1. Maria Louisa of Spain
12. Augustus II of Poland
6. Augustus III of Poland
13. Christiane Eberhardine of Brandenburg-Bayreuth
3. Maria Amalia of Saxony
14. Joseph I, Holy Roman Emperor
7. Maria Josepha of Austria
15. Wilhelmine Amalie of Brunswick

Maria Luisa of Spain House of Bourbon Cadet branch of the Capetian dynasty Born: 24 November 1745 Died: 15 May 1792
Italian nobility
Preceded by Maria Theresa of Austria	Grand Duchess consort of Tuscany; 1765–1790	Succeeded by Princess Luisa of Naples and Sicily
German royalty
Preceded by Maria Josepha of Bavaria	Holy Roman Empress; 1790–1792	Succeeded by Maria Theresa of Naples and Sicily
Preceded by Maria Josepha of Bavaria	German Queen; 1790–1792	Succeeded by Maria Theresa of Naples and Sicily
Vacant Title last held by Elisabeth Christine of Brunswick-Wolfenbüttel	Queen consort of Hungary and Bohemia; 1790–1792	Succeeded by Maria Theresa of Naples and Sicily
Vacant Title last held by Elisabeth Christine of Brunswick-Wolfenbüttel	Archduchess consort of Austria; 1790–1792	Succeeded by Maria Theresa of Naples and Sicily
