= Archduchess Maria Anna of Austria (1770–1809) =

Austrian archduchess

Archduchess Maria Anna
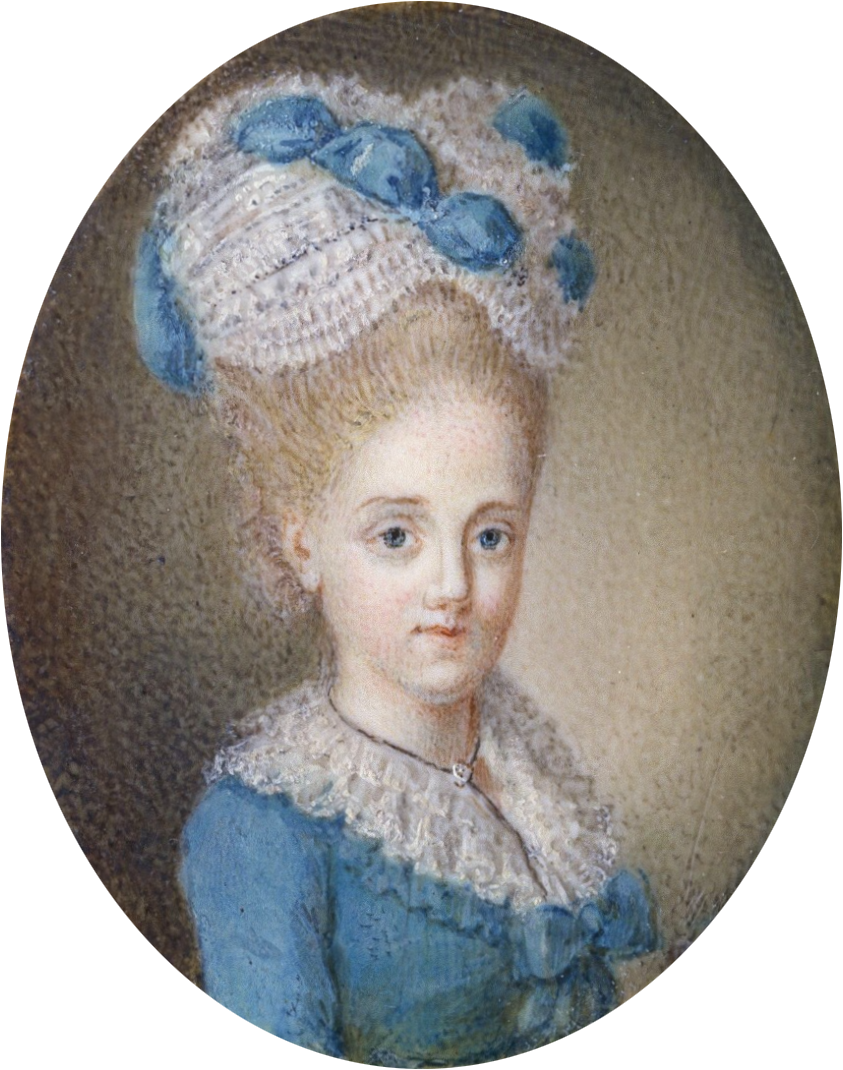
- Maria Anna, circa 1772-1790
- Born: 21 April 1770; Florence, Grand Duchy of Tuscany
- Died: 1 October 1809 (aged 39); Neudorf, Kingdom of Hungary, Austrian Empire
- Burial: Neudorf
Names
- Maria Anna Ferdinanda Josepha Charlotte Johanna
- House: Habsburg-Lorraine
- Father: Leopold II, Holy Roman Emperor
- Mother: Infanta Maria Luisa of Spain

Archduchess Maria Anna of Austria (German: Maria Anna Ferdinanda Josepha Charlotte Johanna; 21 April 1770 – 1 October 1809) was an archduchess of Austria as the daughter of Leopold II, Holy Roman Emperor and became princess-abbess of the Theresian Institution of Noble Ladies in Prague.

== Life ==
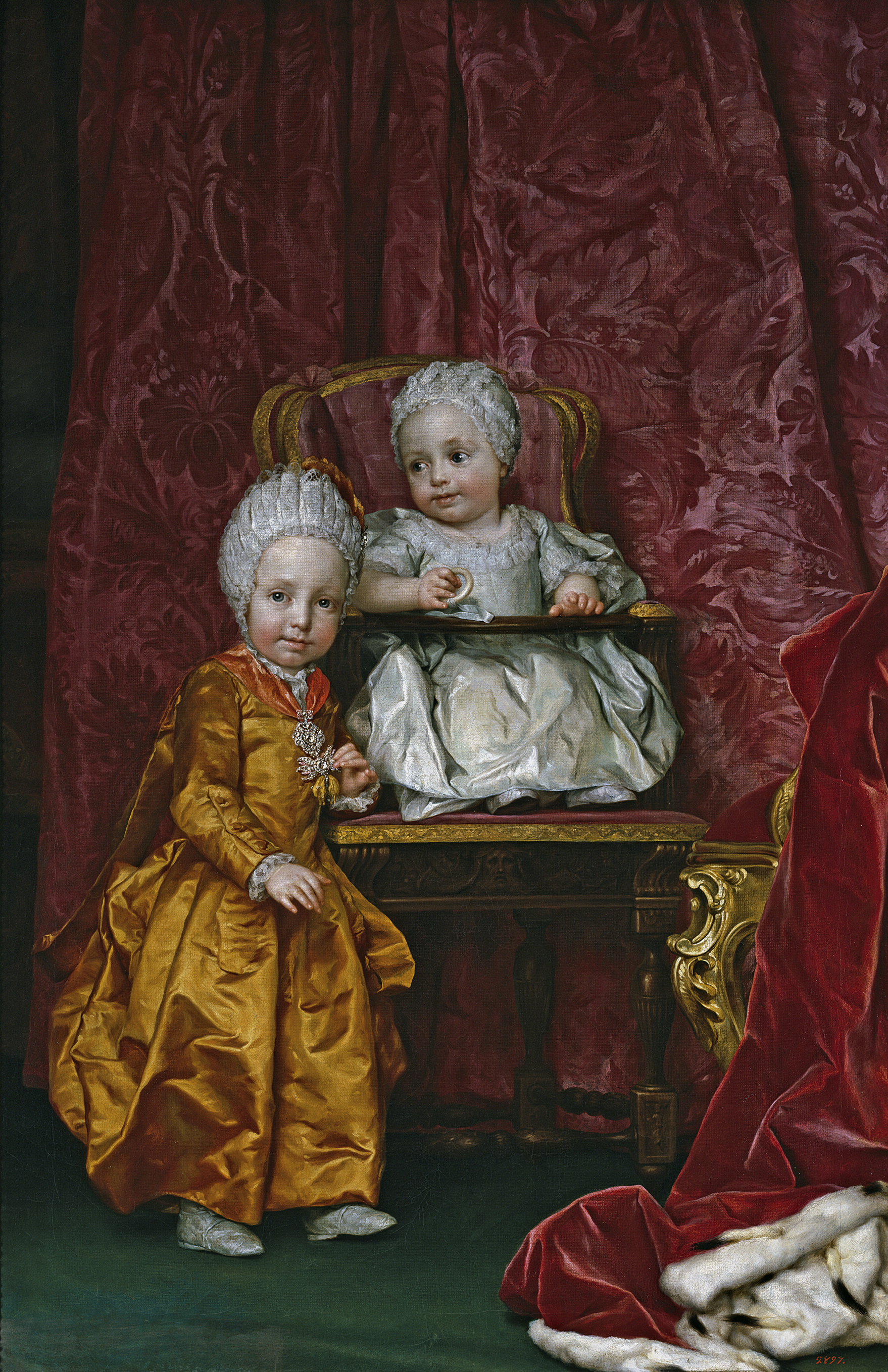
Maria Anna with her older brother Ferdinand in 1770 on a painting by Anton Raphael Mengs.

Maria Anna was the fourth of the sixteen children of Leopold II, Holy Roman Emperor and his wife, Maria Luisa of Spain. She was born in Florence, the capital of Tuscany where her father reigned as grand duke from 1765 to 1790. Her father was a son of Empress Maria Theresa, sovereign of the Habsburg monarchy, and her mother a daughter of King Charles III of Spain.

She had a happy childhood surrounded by her many siblings. They were given a different upbringing than was usual for royal children at the time: they were raised by their parents rather than by servants, were largely kept apart from the ceremonies of court life and was taught to live simply, naturally, and modestly.

In 1791, she became abbess of the Theresian Institution of Noble Ladies in Prague, a monastic chapter of secular canonesses founded by Maria Anna's grandmother, Maria Theresa for poor noblewomen. In 1809, she travelled to Neudorf (today a part of Zăbrani, Romania) where she died on 1 October, aged thirty-nine. In 1841, her nephew, Emperor Ferdinand I of Austria commissioned a funerary plaque of Carrara marble.

== Ancestors ==
Ancestors of Archduchess Maria Anna of Austria (1770–1809)

8. Leopold, Duke of Lorraine
4. Francis I, Holy Roman Emperor
9. Élisabeth Charlotte of Orléans
2. Leopold II, Holy Roman Emperor
10. Charles VI, Holy Roman Emperor
5. Maria Theresa of Austria
11. Elisabeth Christine of Brunswick
1. Archduchess Maria Anna of Austria
12. Philip V of Spain
6. Charles III of Spain
13. Elisabeth Farnese
3. Maria Luisa of Spain
14. Augustus III of Poland
7. Maria Amalia of Saxony
15. Maria Josepha of Austria

== Bibliography ==
- Wurzbach, Constantin von, ed. (1861). "Habsburg, Maria Anna (1770–1809)" . Biographisches Lexikon des Kaiserthums Oesterreich [Biographical Encyclopedia of the Austrian Empire] (in German). Vol. 7. pp. 27–28 – via Wikisource.

| Preceded by Archduchess Maria Anna of Austria (1738–1789) | Abbess at the Theresian Convent in Prague; 1791–1800 | Succeeded by Maria Theresa of Austria (1816–1867) |
