= Leopold II, Holy Roman Emperor =

Holy Roman Emperor from 1790 to 1792

Leopold II
- Imperator Romanorum
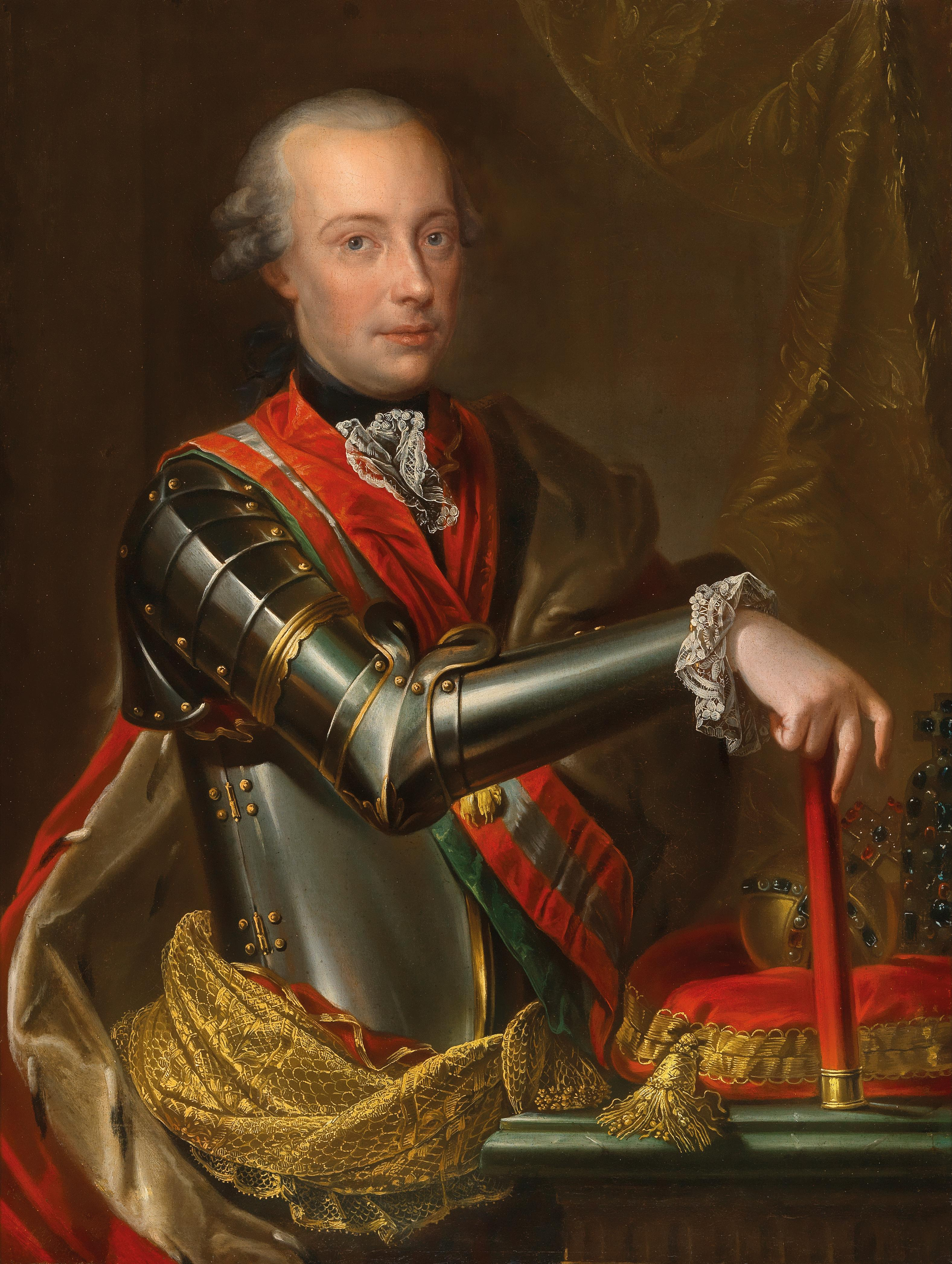
- Portrait by Anton Hickel, c. 1790–1792

Holy Roman Emperor
- Reign: 30 September 1790 – 1 March 1792
- Coronation: 9 October 1790; Frankfurt Cathedral
- Predecessor: Joseph II
- Successor: Francis II
- Governors (in Habsburg Netherlands): See list: Maria Christina of Austria and Albert Casimir, Duke of Teschen (1790–1792)

Archduke of Austria, King of Hungary, Croatia, Galicia and Lodomeria and Bohemia
- Reign: 20 February 1790 – 1 March 1792
- Coronation: 15 November 1790
- Predecessor: Joseph II
- Successor: Francis II

Grand Duke of Tuscany (as Leopold I)
- Reign: 18 August 1765 – 22 July 1790
- Predecessor: Francis Stephen
- Successor: Ferdinand III
- Born: 5 May 1747; Vienna, Archduchy of Austria, Holy Roman Empire
- Died: 1 March 1792 (aged 44); Vienna, Archduchy of Austria, Holy Roman Empire
- Burial: Imperial Crypt
- Spouse: Maria Luisa of Spain (m. 1764)
- Issue: See: Maria Theresa, Queen of Saxony; Francis II, Holy Roman Emperor; Ferdinand III, Grand Duke of Tuscany; Archduchess Maria Anna; Charles, Duke of Teschen; Alexander Leopold, Palatine of Hungary; Joseph, Palatine of Hungary; Maria Clementina, Duchess of Calabria; Anton Victor, Archbishop and Prince-Elector of Cologne; Archduchess Maria Amalia; Archduke John; Archduke Rainer; Archduke Louis; Rudolf, Cardinal-Archbishop of Olomouc
Names
- Peter Leopold Josef Anton Joachim Pius Gotthard
- House: Habsburg-Lorraine
- Father: Francis I, Holy Roman Emperor
- Mother: Maria Theresa
- Religion: Roman Catholicism
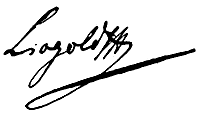
- Signature

Leopold II (Peter Leopold Josef Anton Joachim Pius Gotthard; 5 May 1747 – 1 March 1792) was the penultimate Holy Roman Emperor, as well as King of Hungary, Croatia and Bohemia, and Archduke of Austria from 1790 to 1792, and Grand Duke of Tuscany from 1765 to 1790 as Leopold I. He was a son of Empress Maria Theresa and Emperor Francis I, and the brother of Queen Marie Antoinette of France, Queen Maria Carolina, Duchess Maria Amalia of Parma, and Emperor Joseph II. Leopold was a moderate proponent of enlightened absolutism like his brother Joseph II. He granted the Academy of Georgofili his protection. Unusually for his time, he opposed the death penalty and torture and abolished it in Tuscany on 30 November 1786 during his rule there, making it the first nation in modern history to abolish the death penalty. This act has been commemorated since 2000 by a regional custom known as the Feast of Tuscany, held every 30 November. Despite his brief reign, he is highly regarded. The historian Paul W. Schroeder called him "one of the most shrewd and sensible monarchs ever to wear a crown".

== Youth ==
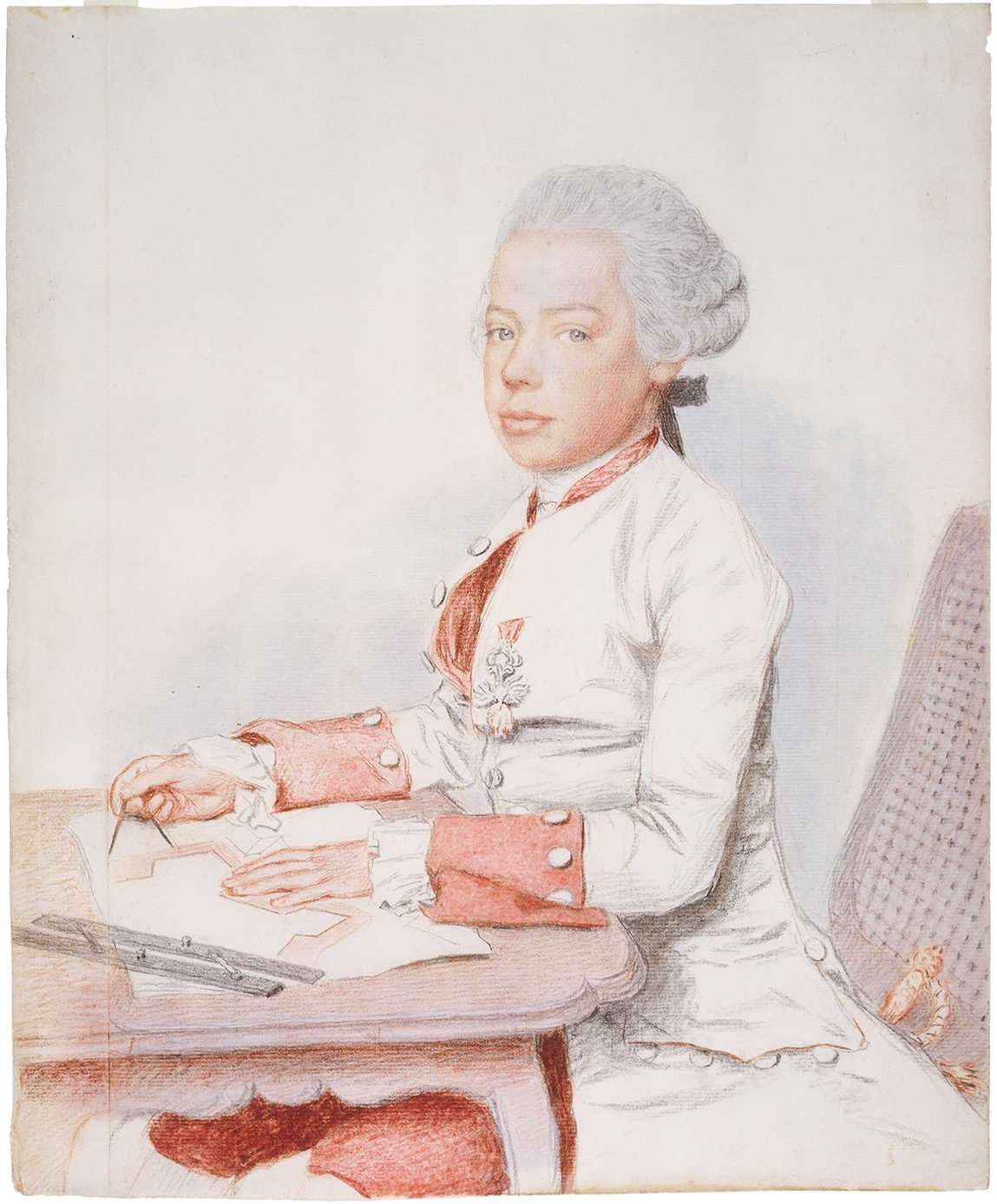
Young Leopold Drawing Fortifications, Jean-Étienne Liotard, 1762

Leopold was born in Vienna as his parents' third son. Initially selected for a clerical career, he received an education with a focus on theology. In 1753, he was engaged to Maria Beatrice d'Este, heiress to the Duchy of Modena. The couple never married, however, as, after the death of his second eldest brother Charles Joseph, he became the heir presumptive of his eldest brother, Joseph, and the treaties had to be revised. Maria Beatrice instead married Leopold's brother, Archduke Ferdinand.

Upon the early death of his older brother Archduke Charles in 1761, the family decided that Leopold was going to succeed his father as Grand Duke of Tuscany. Tuscany had been envisioned and designated as a secundogeniture, a territory and title bestowed upon the second born son, which was greater than an appanage. On 5 August 1765, Leopold married Maria Luisa, daughter of King Charles III of Spain and Maria Amalia of Saxony; however, they were already married by proxy on 16 February 1764 in Madrid, more than a year before their in-person marriage. Upon the death of his father, Francis I, on 18 August 1765, he became Grand Duke of Tuscany.

== Grand Duke of Tuscany ==
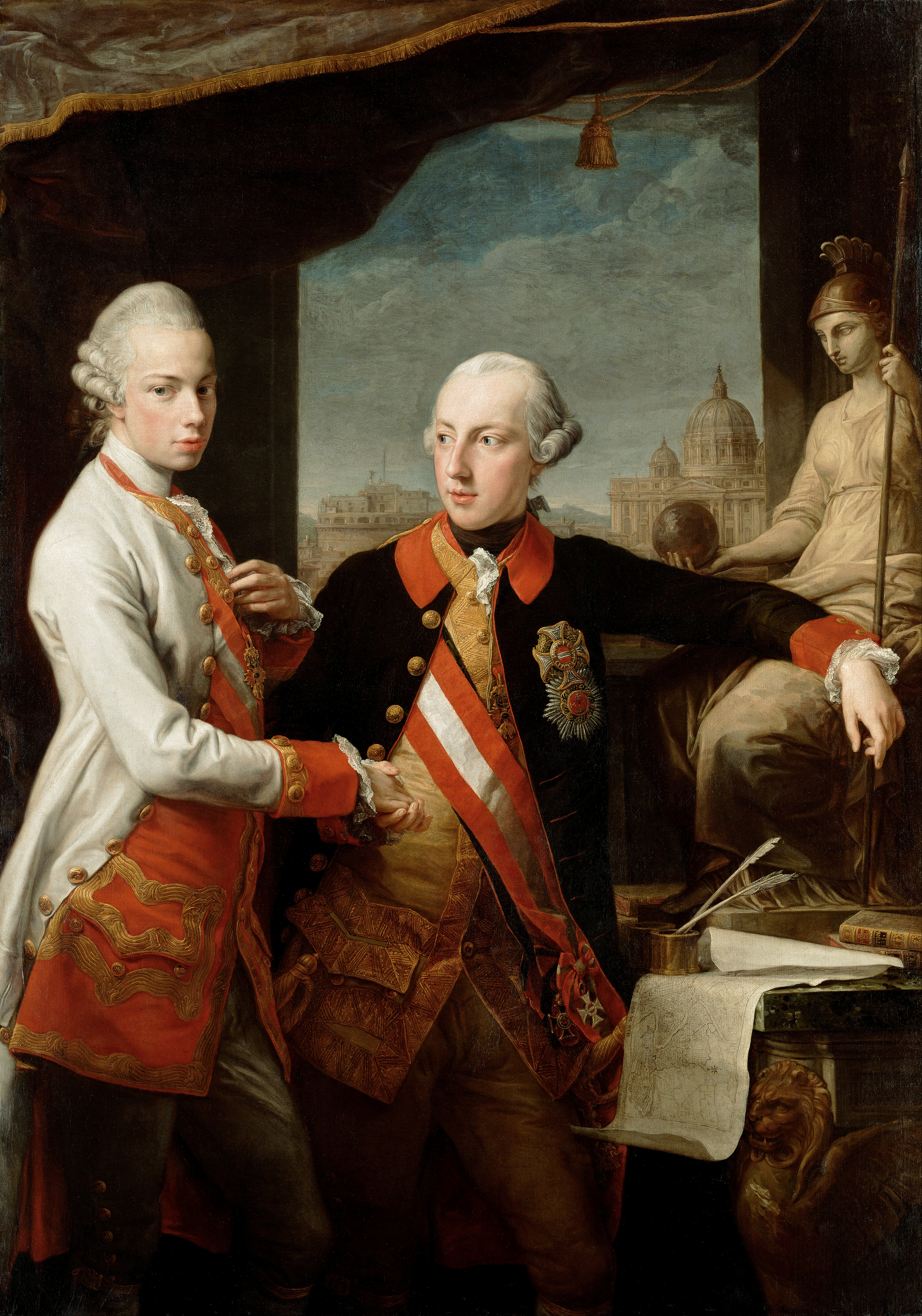
Leopold (left) with his brother Emperor Joseph II, Emperor Joseph II and Grand Duke Pietro Leopoldo of Tuscany by Pompeo Batoni, 1769, Vienna, Kunsthistorisches Museum

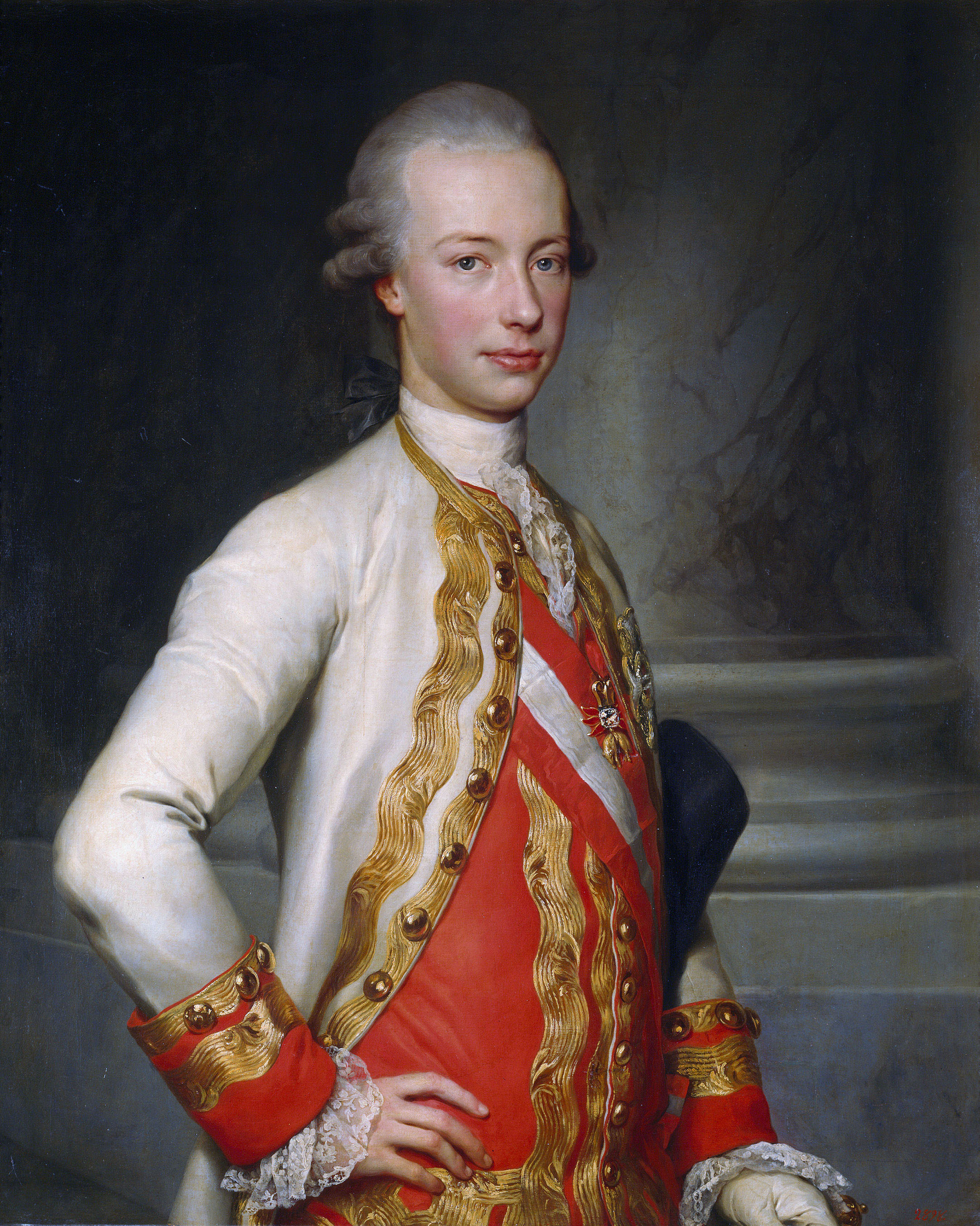
Leopold as Grand Duke of Tuscany, portrait by Anton Raphael Mengs, 1770

For five years, Leopold exercised little more than nominal authority, under the supervision of counsellors appointed by his mother. In 1770, he made a journey to Vienna to secure the removal of this vexatious guardianship and returned to Florence with a free hand. During the twenty years that elapsed between his return to Florence and the death of his eldest brother Joseph II in 1790, he was employed in reforming the administration of his small state. The reformation was carried out by the removal of the ruinous restrictions on industry and personal freedom imposed by his predecessors of the House of Medici and left untouched during his father's life, by the introduction of a rational system of taxation (reducing the rates of taxation), and by the execution of profitable public works, such as the drainage of the Valdichiana.

As Leopold had no army to maintain, and as he suppressed the small naval force kept up by the Medici, the whole of his revenue was left free for the improvement of his state. Leopold was never popular with his Italian subjects. His disposition was cold and retiring. His habits were simple to the verge of sordidness, though he could display splendour on occasion, and he could not help offending those of his subjects who had profited by the abuses of the Medicean régime.

But his steady, consistent, and intelligent administration, which advanced step by step, brought the grand duchy to a high level of material prosperity. His ecclesiastical policy, which disturbed the deeply rooted convictions of his people and brought him into collision with the Pope, was not successful. He was unable to secularise the property of the religious houses or to put the clergy entirely under the control of the lay power. However, his abolition of capital punishment was the first permanent abolition in modern times. On 30 November 1786, after having de facto blocked capital executions (the last was in 1769), Leopold promulgated the reform of the penal code and introduced the Leopoldine Code that abolished the death penalty and ordered the destruction of all the instruments for capital execution in his land. Torture was also banned.

In line with the theories of the Age of Enlightenment, he enlarged La Specola with medical waxworks and other exhibits, aiming to educate Florentines in the empirical observation of natural laws.

Leopold also approved and collaborated on the development of a political constitution, said to have anticipated by many years the promulgation of the French constitution and which presented some similarities with the Virginia Bill of Rights of 1778. Leopold's concept of this was based on respect for the political rights of citizens and on a harmony of power between the executive and the legislative. However, it could not be put into effect because Leopold moved to Vienna to become emperor in 1790, and because it was so radically new that it garnered opposition even from those who might have benefited from it.

Leopold developed and supported many social and economic reforms. Smallpox inoculation was made systematically available, and an early institution for the rehabilitation of juvenile delinquents was founded. Leopold also introduced radical reforms to the system of neglect and inhumane treatment of those deemed mentally ill. On 23 January 1774, the "legge sui pazzi" (law on the insane) was established, the first of its kind to be introduced in Europe, allowing steps to be taken to hospitalise individuals deemed insane. A few years later, Leopold undertook the project of building a new hospital, the Bonifacio Hospital. He used his skill at choosing collaborators to put a young physician, Vincenzo Chiarugi, at its head. Chiarugi and his collaborators introduced new humanitarian regulations in the running of the hospital and caring for the mentally ill patients, including banning the use of chains and physical punishment, and in so doing have been recognised as early pioneers of what later came to be known as the moral treatment movement.

During the last few years of his rule in Tuscany, Leopold had begun to be frightened by the increasing disorders in the German and Hungarian dominions of his family, which were the direct result of his brother's strict methods. He and Joseph II were tenderly attached to one another and met frequently both before and after the death of their mother. The portrait by Pompeo Batoni in which they appear together shows that they bore a strong personal resemblance to one another. But it may be said of Leopold, as of Bernard le Bovier de Fontenelle, that his heart was made of brains. He knew that he had to succeed his childless eldest brother in Austria, and he was unwilling to inherit his unpopularity. When, therefore, in 1789, Joseph, who knew himself to be dying, asked him to come to Vienna and become co-regent, Leopold evaded the request.

He was still in Florence when Joseph II died at Vienna on 20 February 1790, and he did not leave his Italian capital until 3 March 1790. Following the principle of secundogeniture which had allowed him to rule Tuscany, Leopold entrusted the grand duchy to his younger son Ferdinand III, who ruled until the French invasion in 1797 and then again from 1814 to 1824.

== Holy Roman Emperor ==
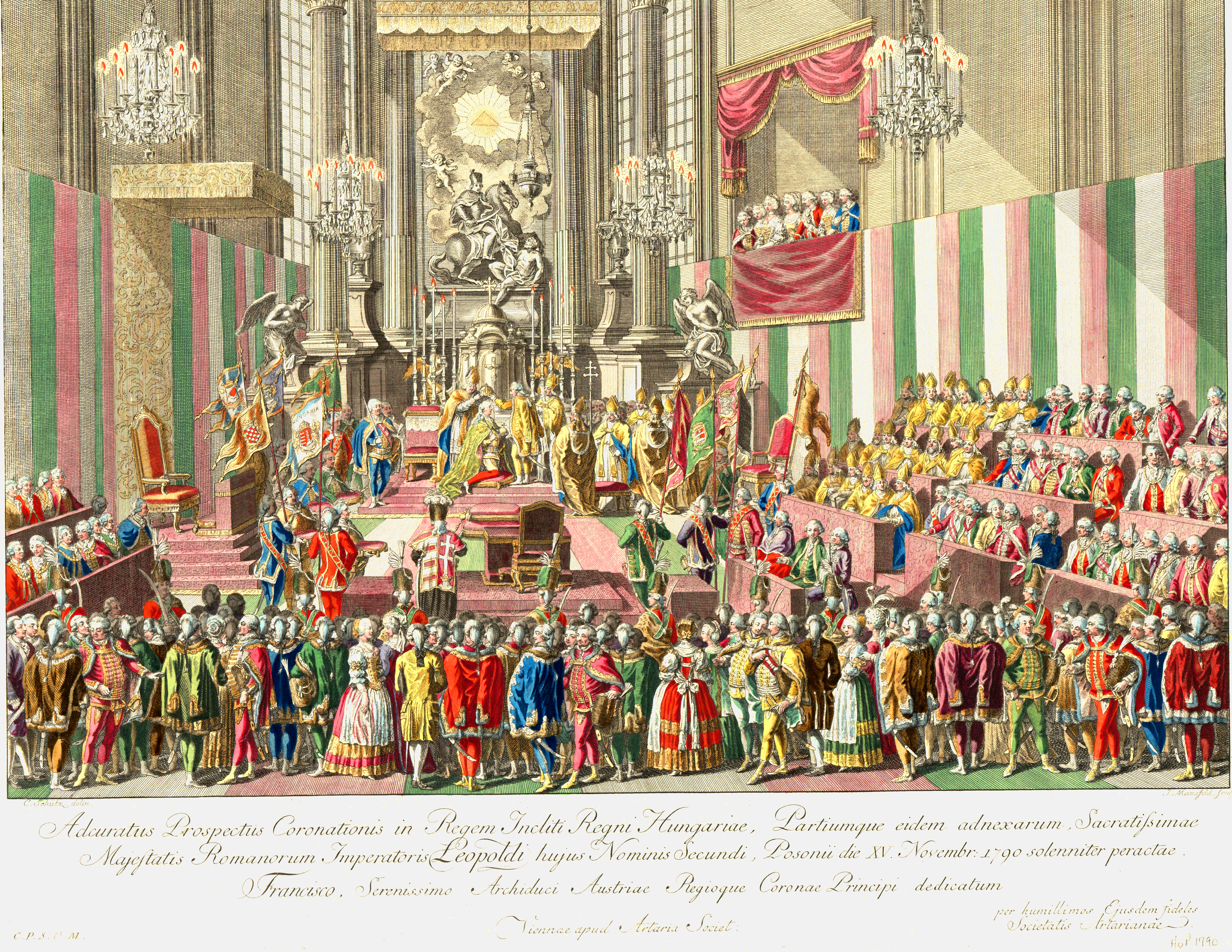
Leopold's coronation as King of Hungary in Pressburg, by Carl Schütz

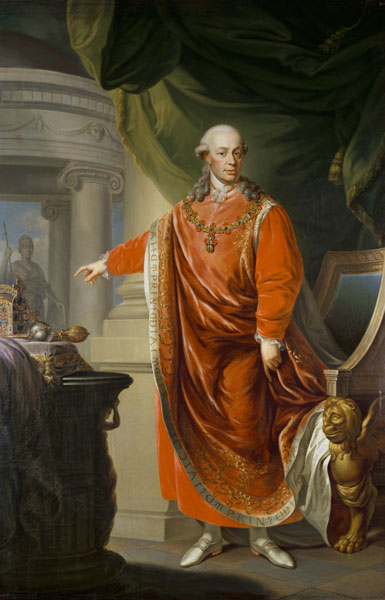
Leopold II as Holy Roman Emperor, depicted posthumously by János Donát, 1806

Leopold, during his government in Tuscany, had shown a speculative tendency to grant his subjects a constitution. When he succeeded to the Austrian lands, he began by making large concessions to the interests offended by his brother's innovations. He recognised the Estates of his different dominions as "the pillars of the monarchy", pacified the Hungarians and Bohemians, and divided the insurgents in the Austrian Netherlands (now Belgium) by means of concessions. When these failed to restore order, he marched troops into the country and re-established his own authority, and at the same time the historic franchises of the Flemings. Yet he did not surrender any part that could be retained of what Maria Theresa and Joseph had done to strengthen the hands of the state. He continued, for instance, to insist that no papal bull could be published in his dominions without his consent (placetum regium). One of the harshest actions Leopold took to placate the noble communities of the various Habsburg domains was to issue a decree on 9 May 1790 that forced thousands of Bohemian serfs freed by his brother Joseph back into servitude.

Leopold lived for barely two years after his accession as Holy Roman Emperor, and during that period, he was hard pressed by peril from west and east alike. The growing revolutionary disorders in France endangered the life of his sister Marie Antoinette, the queen of Louis XVI, and also threatened his own dominions with the spread of subversive agitation. His sister sent him passionate appeals for help, and he was pestered by the royalist émigrés, who were intriguing to bring about armed intervention in France.

From the east, he was threatened by the aggressive ambition of Catherine II of Russia and by the unscrupulous policy of Prussia. Catherine would have been delighted to see Austria and Prussia embark on a crusade in the cause of kings against the French Revolution. While they were busy beyond the Rhine, she would have annexed what remained of Poland and made conquests against the Ottoman Empire. Leopold II had no difficulty in seeing through the rather transparent cunning of the Russian empress, and he refused to be misled.

To his sister, he gave good advice and promises of help if she and her husband could escape from Paris. The émigrés who followed him pertinaciously were refused audience, or when they forced themselves on him, were peremptorily denied all help. Leopold was too purely a politician not to be secretly pleased at the destruction of the power of France and of her influence in Europe by her internal disorders. Within six weeks of his accession, he displayed his contempt for France's weakness by practically tearing up the treaty of alliance made by Maria Theresa in 1756 and opening negotiations with Great Britain to impose a check on Russia and Prussia.

Leopold put pressure on Great Britain by threatening to cede his part of the Low Countries to France. Then, when sure of British support, he was in a position to baffle the intrigues of Prussia. A personal appeal to Frederick William II led to a conference between them at Reichenbach in July 1790, and to an arrangement which was in fact a defeat for Prussia: Leopold's coronation as King of Hungary on 11 November 1790, preceded by a settlement with the Diet in which he recognised the dominant position of the Magyars. He had already made an eight months' truce with the Ottoman Turks in September, which prepared the way for the termination of the war begun by Joseph II. The pacification of his eastern dominions left Leopold free to re-establish order in Belgium and to confirm friendly relations with Britain and the Netherlands.

During 1791, the emperor remained increasingly preoccupied with the affairs of France. In January, he had to dismiss the Count of Artois (afterwards Charles X of France) in a very peremptory way. His good sense was revolted by the folly of the French émigrés, and he did his utmost to avoid being entangled in the affairs of that country. The insults inflicted on Louis XVI and Marie Antoinette, however, at the time of their attempted flight to Varennes in June, stirred his indignation, and he made a general appeal in the Padua Circular to the sovereigns of Europe to take common measures in view of events which "immediately compromised the honour of all sovereigns, and the security of all governments." Yet he was most directly interested in negotiations with the Ottoman Turks, which in June led to a final peace, the Treaty of Sistova being signed in August 1791.

On 25 August 1791, he met the King of Prussia at Pillnitz Castle, near Dresden, and they drew up the Declaration of Pillnitz, stating their readiness to intervene in France if and when their assistance was called for by the other powers. The declaration was a mere formality, for, as Leopold knew, neither Russia nor Britain was prepared to act, and he endeavoured to guard against the use which he foresaw the émigrés would try to make of it. In the face of the reaction in France to the Declaration of Pillnitz, the intrigues of the émigrés, and attacks made by the French revolutionists on the rights of the German princes in Alsace, Leopold continued to hope that intervention might not be required. When Louis XVI swore to observe the constitution of September 1791, the emperor professed to think that a settlement had been reached in France. The attacks on the rights of the German princes on the left bank of the Rhine, and the increasing violence of the parties in Paris which were agitating to bring about war, soon showed, however, that this hope was vain. Leopold meant to meet the challenge of the revolutionists in France with dignity and temper; however, the effect of the Declaration of Pillnitz was to contribute to the radicalisation of their political movement.

Like his parents before him, Leopold had sixteen children, the eldest of his eight sons being his successor, Emperor Francis II. Some of his other sons were prominent personages in their day. Among them were: Ferdinand III, Grand Duke of Tuscany; Archduke Charles, Duke of Teschen, a celebrated soldier; Archduke Johann of Austria, also a soldier; Archduke Joseph, Palatine of Hungary; and Archduke Rainer, Viceroy of Lombardy-Venetia.

Leopold died suddenly from pneumonia in Vienna on 1 March 1792. He was buried in the Tuscan Crypt within the Imperial Crypt in Vienna.

== Patronage of the arts ==
As a patron of the arts, Leopold II had an impact on the arts and culture of both Tuscany and Vienna. He was particularly passionate about Italian opera as practised in the city of Florence. While the Grand Duke of Tuscany from 1765 to 1790, he was a major patron of the composer Tommaso Traetta and subsidised the costs of staging many new innovative operas by that composer, including the first staging in Florence of Traetta's 1763 masterwork Ifigenia in Tauride. He also was a patron of the opera singers Giovanni Manzuoli, Giusto Fernando Tenducci, and Tommaso Guarducci.

Upon his succession to the Holy Roman Emperor in 1790, Leopold II brought his passion for Florentine opera to the Vienna court, and brought with him many of the musicians and opera singers he enjoyed in Tuscany to Vienna. Many of the previously active singers, librettists, and composers at the Vienna court, such as librettist Lorenzo Da Ponte, were dismissed by Leopold II as he significantly changed the staffing of artists in the Vienna court.

Before Leopold II opera buffa had been the center of the Vienna court, but after his succession and by Leopold's direction opera seria and ballet became the central repertoire of both the Burgtheater and Kärntnertortheate. Following this shift, Mozart, who had previously written the opera buffas The Marriage of Figaro (1786), Don Giovanni (1787), and Così fan tutte (1790) with Da Ponte, created the opera seria La clemenza di Tito which was commissioned by the Estates of Bohemia for the festivities that accompanied Leopold's coronation as king of Bohemia in Prague on 6 September 1791. This shift toward opera seria and ballet continued in Vienna beyond Leopold II's reign decades into the 19th century.

Leopold as Grand Duke of Tuscany together with his family

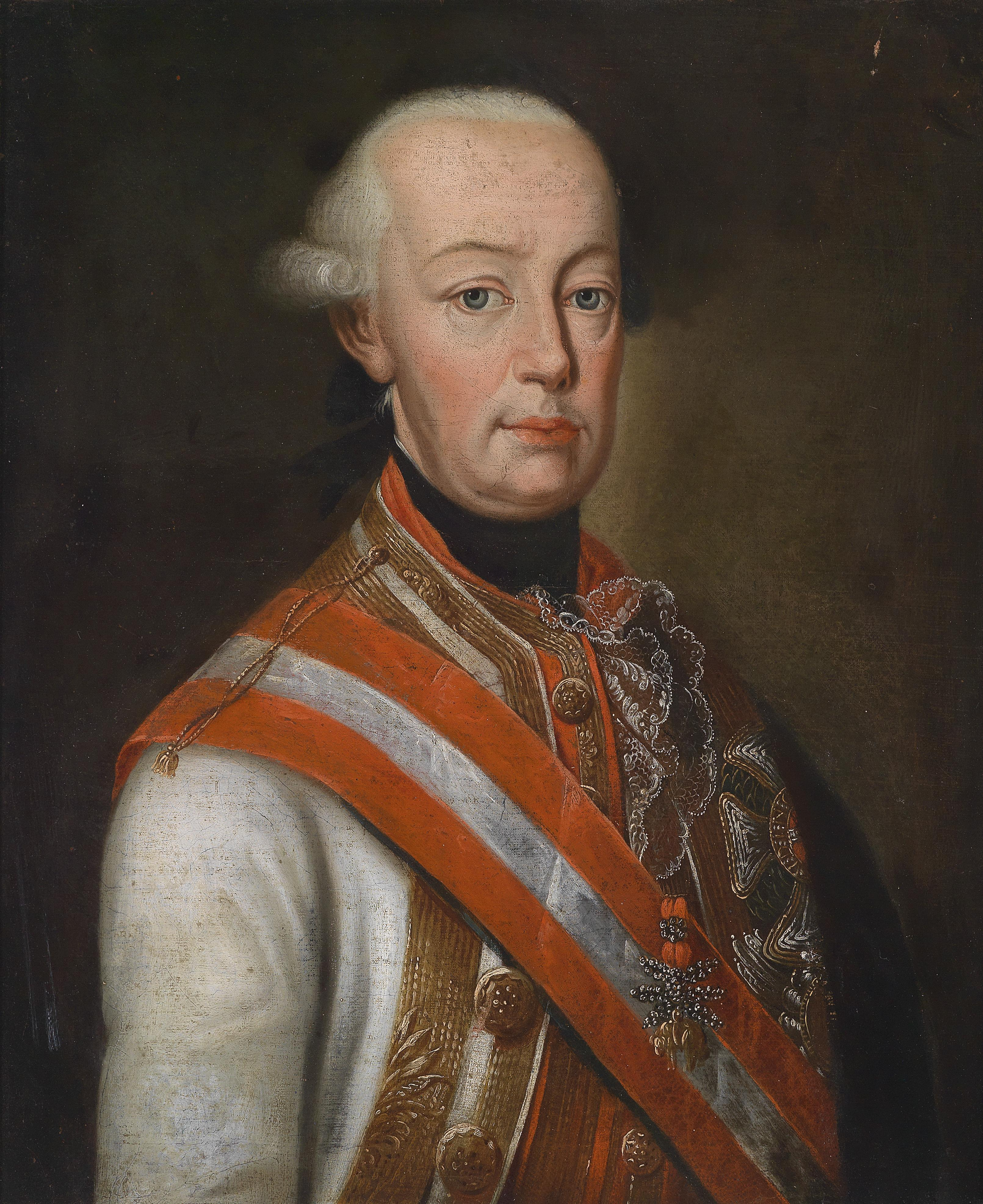
Portrait of Leopold as Grand Duke of Tuscany shortly before becoming Holy Roman Emperor, c. 1790

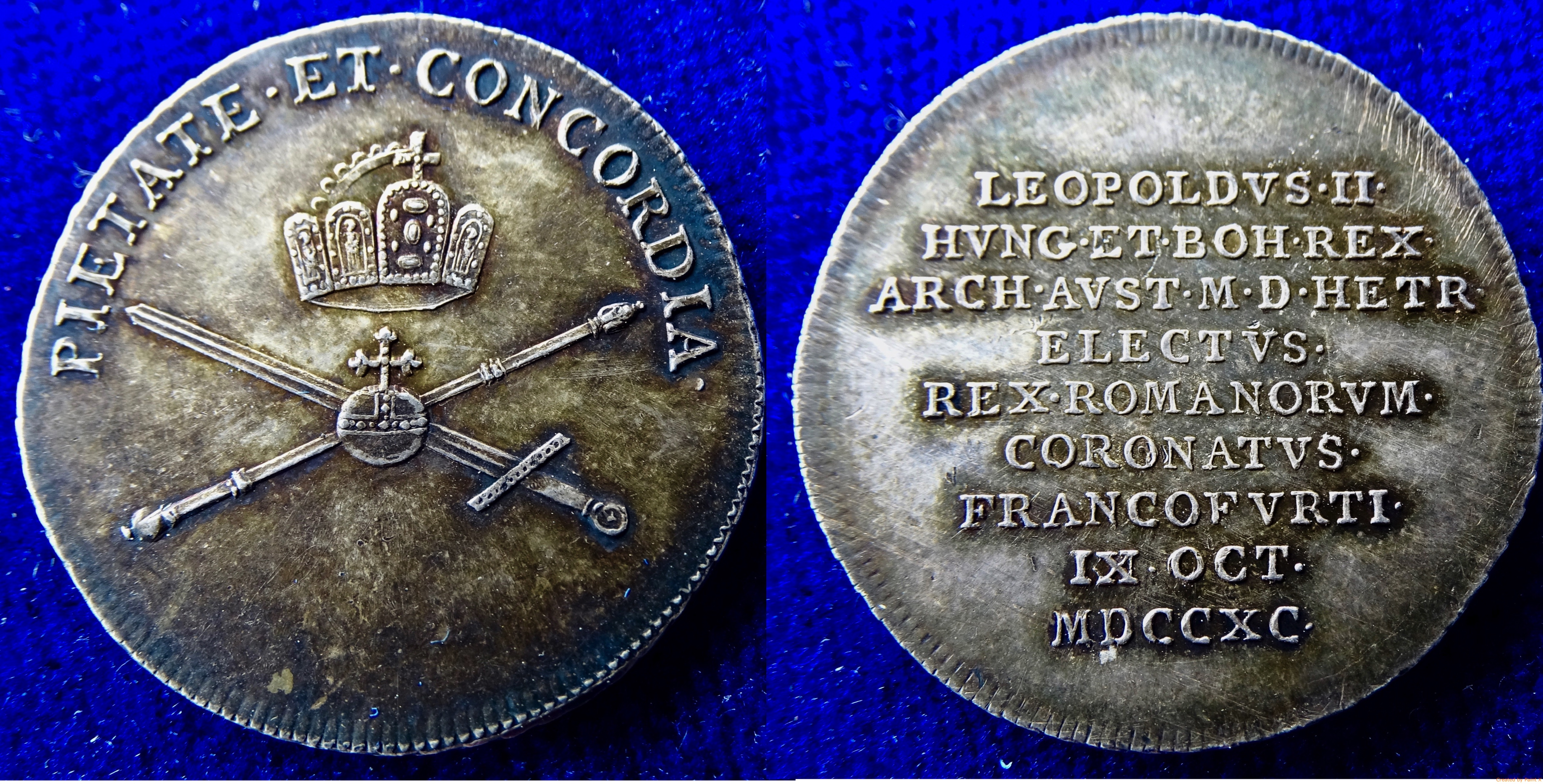
Coronation in Frankfurt am Main 9 October 1790. Silver strike of a coronation coin with Leopold's motto "pietate et concordia" above the Imperial Regalia.

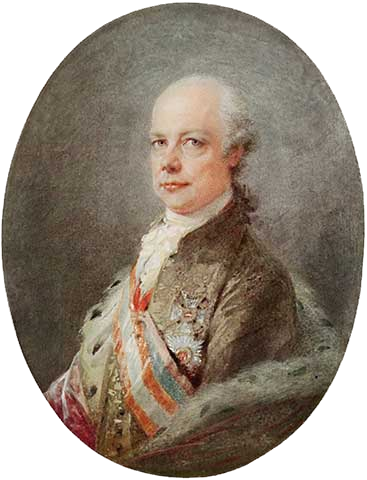
Portrait of Emperor Leopold II shortly before his death, by Heinrich Friedrich Füger

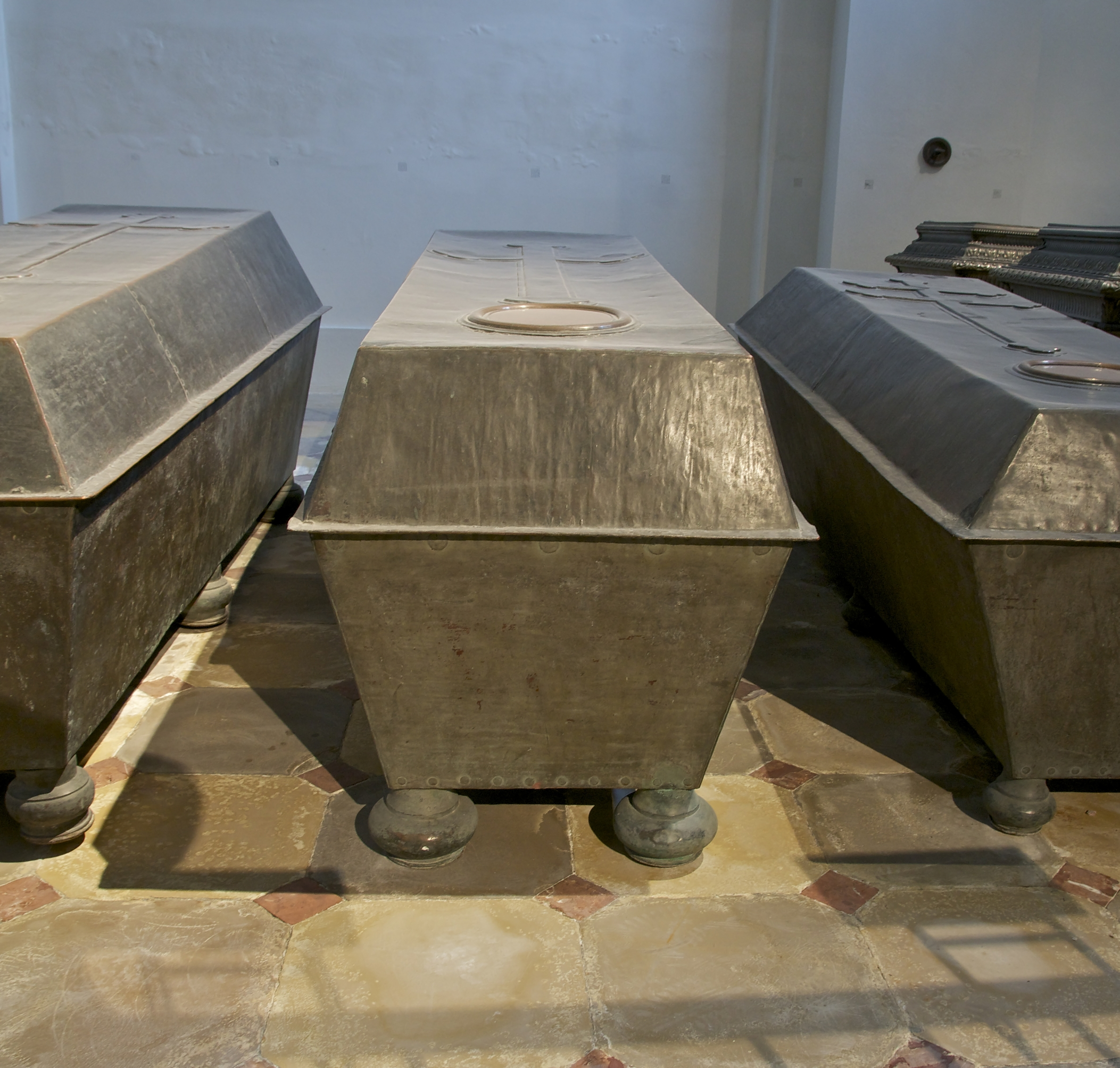
Sarcophagus of Leopold II in Kapuzinergruft, in Vienna, Austria

== Issue ==
His mother, Empress Maria Theresa, was the last Habsburg and he was one of 16 children. His brother Joseph II died without any surviving children. Leopold had 16 children, just like his mother, and became the founder of the main line of the House of Habsburg-Lorraine.

Children with his wife Infanta Maria Luisa of Spain (also known as Maria Ludovica of Spain):

Name	Birth	Death	Notes
Archduchess Maria Theresa	14 January 1767	7 November 1827 (aged 60)	Married Anthony, King of Saxony in 1787; no surviving issue.
Francis II, Holy Roman Emperor	12 February 1768	2 March 1835 (aged 67)	Married (1) Duchess Elisabeth of Württemberg in 1788; no surviving issue. Married (2) Princess Maria Teresa of Naples and Sicily in 1790; had issue. Married (3) Maria Ludovika of Austria-Este in 1808; no issue. Married (4) Caroline Augusta of Bavaria in 1816; no issue. Francis II, Holy Roman Emperor, would be the last Holy Roman Emperor.
Ferdinand III, Grand Duke of Tuscany	6 May 1769	18 June 1824 (aged 55)	Married (1) Princess Luisa of Naples and Sicily in 1790; had issue. Married (2) Princess Maria Ferdinanda of Saxony, daughter of Maximilian, Crown Prince of Saxony, in 1821; no issue.
Archduchess Maria Anna	22 April 1770	1 October 1809 (aged 39)	Never married. Became an Abbess at the Theresian Convent in Prague.
Archduke Charles	5 September 1771	30 April 1847 (aged 75)	Married Henrietta of Nassau-Weilburg in 1815; had issue.
Archduke Alexander Leopold	14 August 1772	12 July 1795 (aged 22)	Never married. Accidentally burned to death from a mishap while conducting a fireworks show.
Archduke Albrecht Johann Joseph	19 September 1773	22 July 1774 (aged 10 months)	Died in infancy.
Archduke Maximilian Johann Joseph	23 December 1774	10 March 1778 (aged 3)	Died in childhood.
Archduke Joseph	9 March 1776	13 January 1847 (aged 70)	Married (1) Grand Duchess Alexandra Pavlovna of Russia in 1799; no surviving issue. Married (2) Princess Hermine of Anhalt-Bernburg-Schaumburg-Hoym in 1815; had issue. Married (3) Duchess Maria Dorothea of Württemberg in 1819; had issue. He and his eldest son were the last two Counts palatine of Hungary.
Archduchess Maria Clementina of Austria	24 April 1777	15 November 1801 (aged 24)	Married the Duke of Calabria, later King Francis I of the Two Sicilies, in 1797. Her only surviving daughter, Marie-Caroline of Bourbon-Two Sicilies, Duchess of Berry, married Charles Ferdinand, Duke of Berry, and was the mother of French pretender Henri, Count of Chambord.
Archduke Anton Victor of Austria	31 August 1779	2 April 1835 (aged 55)	Never married; became Prince-Bishop of Münster, Grand Master of the Teutonic Order, Duke of Westphalia and titular Prince-Elector-Archbishop of Cologne.
Archduchess Maria Amalia of Austria	17 October 1780	25 December 1798 (aged 18)	Never married.
Archduke John of Austria	20 January 1782	11 May 1859 (aged 77)	Married morganatically to Countess Anna Plochl in 1829; had issue. The counts of Meran descend from him.
Archduke Rainer Joseph of Austria	30 September 1783	16 January 1853 (aged 69)	Married Princess Elisabeth of Savoy-Carignan, sister of King Charles Albert of Sardinia, in 1820; had issue.
Archduke Louis of Austria	13 December 1784	21 December 1864 (aged 80)	Never married.
Archduke Rudolph of Austria	8 January 1788	24 July 1831 (aged 43)	Never married. Became Archbishop of Olmütz; created Cardinal on 4 June 1819.

=== Illegitimate children ===
- With Livia Raimondi, a ballerina, he had:
  - Luigi von Grün (1788–1814).

== Coat of Arms ==
Middle Coat of arms	Greater Coat of arms	Greater Coat of arms (Shield variant)	Greater Coat of arms (Shield variant with supporters)

== Ancestors ==
Ancestors of Leopold II, Holy Roman Emperor

8. Charles V, Duke of Lorraine
4. Leopold, Duke of Lorraine
9. Eleonore of Austria, Queen of Poland
2. Francis I, Holy Roman Emperor
10. Philippe I, Duke of Orléans
5. Élisabeth Charlotte of Orléans
11. Elizabeth Charlotte, Madame Palatine
1. Leopold II, Holy Roman Emperor
12. Leopold I, Holy Roman Emperor
6. Charles VI, Holy Roman Emperor
13. Eleonore Magdalene of Neuburg
3. Maria Theresa of Austria
14. Louis Rudolph, Duke of Brunswick-Wolfenbüttel
7. Elisabeth Christine of Brunswick
15. Christine Louise of Oettingen-Oettingen

== See also ==
- Kings of Germany family tree

== Bibliography ==
- Vovk, Justin C. (2010). In Destiny's Hands: Five Tragic Rulers, Children of Maria Theresa. iUniverse: Bloomington, Ind. ISBN 978-1-4502-0081-3.
- Gentlemen's Magazine, London, March 1792, pp. 281–282, detailed account of the death at Vienna of His Imperial Majesty Leopold II.
- Rice, John A. "Emperor and Impresario: Leopold II and the Transformation of Viennese Musical Theatre, 1790–1791. PhD diss., University of California, Berkeley, 1987.

Leopold II, Holy Roman Emperor House of Habsburg-Lorraine Cadet branch of the House of Lorraine Born: 5 May 1747 Died: 1 March 1792
Regnal titles
Preceded by Francis I, Holy Roman Emperor	Grand Duke of Tuscany; 1765 – 1790	Succeeded by Ferdinand III, Grand Duke of Tuscany
Preceded by Joseph II, Holy Roman Emperor	Holy Roman Emperor; King in Germany; King of Hungary, Croatia, and Bohemia; Archduke of Austria; Duke of Brabant, Limburg, Lothier, Luxembourg and Milan; Count of Flanders, Hainaut and Namur; 1790 – 1792	Succeeded by Francis II, Holy Roman Emperor
