= Archduchess Maria Amalia of Austria (1780–1798) =

Austrian princess

Archduchess Maria Amalia
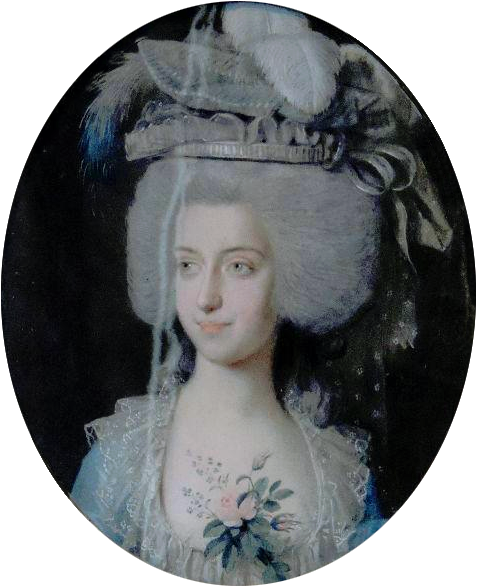
- Archduchess Maria Amalia, circa 1795
- Born: 17 October 1780; Florence, Grand Duchy of Tuscany
- Died: 25 December 1798 (aged 18); Vienna, Archduchy of Austria, Holy Roman Empire
- Burial: Imperial Crypt, Vienna
Names
- Maria Amalia Josephe Johanna Katharina Theresia
- House: Habsburg-Lorraine
- Father: Leopold II, Holy Roman Emperor
- Mother: Infanta Maria Luisa of Spain

Archduchess Maria Amalia of Austria (Maria Amalia Josephe Johanna Katharina Theresia; 15 October 1780 – 25 December 1798) was an Archduchess of Austria by birth.

== Biography ==
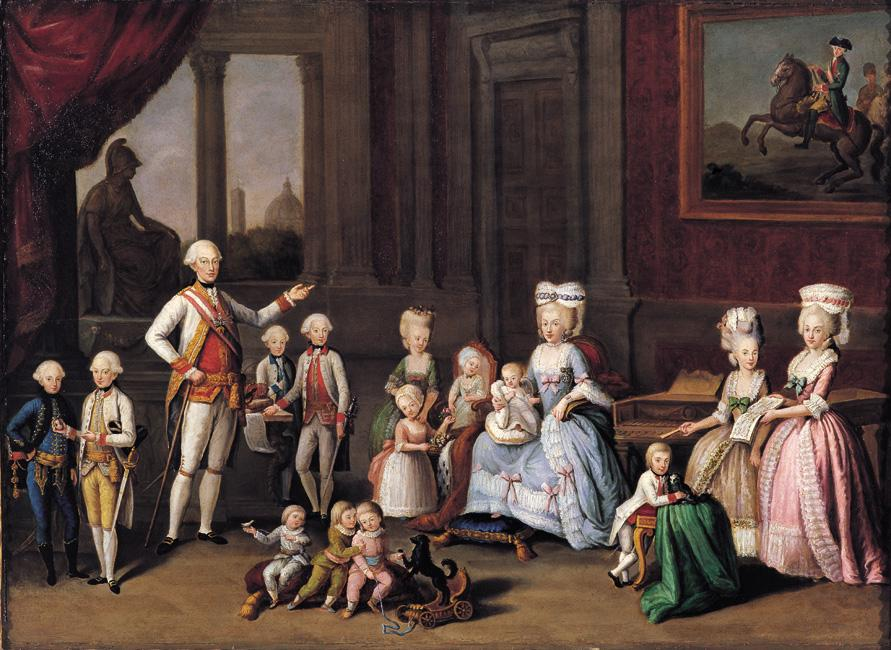
Maria Amalia with her family, circa 1784-1785

Maria Amalia was a daughter of Leopold II, Holy Roman Emperor (1747–1792) and his wife Maria Luisa of Spain (1745–1792). Maria Amalia was born in Florence, the then-capital of the Grand Duchy of Tuscany, where her father reigned as Grand Duke from 1765 to 1790. Her father was a son of Empress Maria Theresa and her mother a daughter of Charles III of Spain. Her godparents were her mother's first cousin, Ferdinand, Duke of Parma, and his wife, Maria Amalia, her father's sister.

She had a happy childhood surrounded by her many siblings. As her siblings, Maria Amalia was given a somewhat different upbringing than was usual for royal children at the time: they were actually raised by their parents rather than a retinue of servants, were largely kept apart from any ceremonial court life and were taught to live simply, naturally and modestly. In 1790, her father became emperor and the family moved to Vienna. She died unmarried at the age of only 18 years in Vienna.

== Ancestors ==
Ancestors of Archduchess Maria Amalia of Austria (1780–1798)

16. Charles V, Duke of Lorraine
8. Leopold, Duke of Lorraine
17. Eleonora Maria Josefa of Austria; Queen Dowager of Poland-Lithuania
4. Francis I, Holy Roman Emperor; Francis III Stephen, Duke of Lorraine
18. Philippe I, Duke of Orléans
9. Princess Élisabeth Charlotte of Orléans
19. Countess Palatine Elizabeth Charlotte of Simmern
2. Leopold II, Holy Roman Emperor
20. Leopold I, Holy Roman Emperor
10. Charles VI, Holy Roman Emperor
21. Eleonore-Magdalena of Neuburg
5. Maria Theresa of Austria; Queen of Hungary & Bohemia
22. Louis Rudolph, Duke of Brunswick-Wolfenbüttel
11. Elisabeth Christine of Brunswick-Wolfenbüttel
23. Princess Christine Louise of Oettingen-Oettingen
1. Archduchess Maria Amalia of Austria
24. Louis, Dauphin of France
12. Philip V of Spain
25. Duchess Maria Anna of Bavaria
6. Charles III of Spain
26. Edward II Farnese, Duke of Parma
13. Elisabeth of Parma
27. Countess Palatine Dorothea Sophie of Neuburg
3. Maria Luisa of Spain
28. Augustus II of Poland; Elector of Saxony
14. Augustus III of Poland; Elector of Saxony
29. Christiane Eberhardine of Brandenburg-Bayreuth
7. Maria Amalia of Saxony
30. Joseph I, Holy Roman Emperor
15. Maria Josepha of Austria
31. Wilhelmine Amalie of Brunswick-Lüneburg
