= Archduchess Maria Theresa of Austria =

Archduchess Maria Theresa of Austria may refer to:

- Archduchess Maria Theresa of Austria (1684–1696), daughter of Leopold I, Holy Roman Emperor
- Archduchess Maria Theresa of Austria (1717–1780), Holy Roman Empress to Francis I, Holy Roman Emperor and ruler of numerous dominions in her own right
- Archduchess Maria Theresa of Austria (1762–1770), daughter of Joseph II
- Archduchess Maria Theresa of Austria (1767–1827), queen consort of Anthony, King of Saxony
- Archduchess Maria Theresa of Austria, Queen of Sardinia (1801–1855)
- Archduchess Maria Theresa of Austria, Queen of the Two Sicilies (1816-1867)
- Archduchess Maria Theresa of Austria (1862–1933)

== See also ==
- Maria Theresa (disambiguation)
- Archduchess Maria of Austria (disambiguation)
- Archduchess Maria Theresia of Austria-Este
