= Archduchess Marie of Austria =

Archduchess Marie of Austria may refer to:

- Archduchess Elisabeth Marie of Austria (1883–1963), only child of Crown Prince Rudolf of Austria and Princess Stéphanie
- Archduchess Marie Amalie of Austria (1746-1804), Princess of Hungary
- Archduchess Marie Astrid of Austria (born 1954), Princess Royal of Hungary and Bohemia
- Archduchess Marie Caroline of Austria (1801–1832), Crown Princess of Saxony
- Archduchess Marie Caroline of Austria (1794-1795), daughter of Francis II, Holy Roman Emperor and Maria Teresa of the Two Sicilies
- Archduchess Marie Valerie of Austria (1868–1924), fourth and last child of Franz Josef, Emperor of Austria-Hungary and Elisabeth, Duchess in Bavaria

== See also ==
- Archduchess Maria (disambiguation)
- Duchess Marie (disambiguation)
- Grand Duchess Maria (disambiguation)
