= Maria of Austria =

Mary or Maria of Austria may refer to:

- Mary of Austria (1505-1558), Queen consort of Louis II of Hungary and Bohemia, governor of the Netherlands for her brother, Charles V
- Maria of Spain (1528 - 1603), daughter of Charles V and Isabella of Portugal; wife of Maximilian II, Holy Roman Emperor
- Archduchess Maria of Austria (1531–1581), daughter of Holy Roman Emperor Ferdinand I and Anna of Bohemia and Hungary
- Maria Anna of Spain (1606 – 1646), Archduchess of Austria, Infanta of Spain; daughter of Philip III of Spain and Margaret of Austria; wife of Ferdinand III, Holy Roman Emperor
- Archduchess Maria of Austria (disambiguation)

== See also ==
- Maria of Habsburg (disambiguation)
