= Princess Isabella of Parma =

Archduchess of Austria (1741–1763)

- Archduchess of Austria
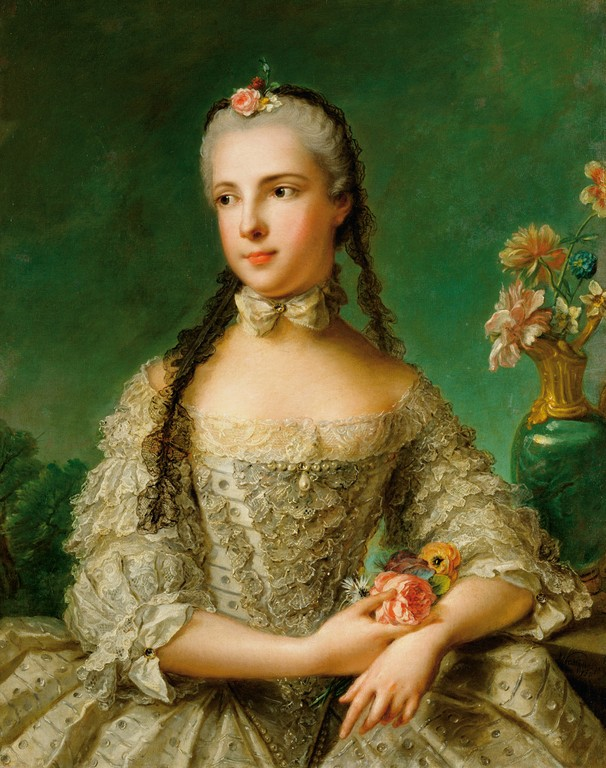
- Portrait by Jean-Marc Nattier, 1758
- Born: 31 December 1741; Buen Retiro Palace, Madrid, Kingdom of Spain
- Died: 27 November 1763 (aged 21); Hofburg, Vienna, Archduchy of Austria, Holy Roman Empire
- Burial: Maria Theresa Vault, Imperial Crypt, Capuchin Church, Vienna, Austria
- Spouse: Joseph II, Holy Roman Emperor (m. 1760)
- Issue: Archduchess Maria Theresa; Archduchess Maria Christina
Names
- Spanish: Isabel María Luisa Antonieta de Borbón-Parma; German: Isabella Maria Ludovica Antonia von Bourbon-Parma; French: Isabelle-Marie-Louise-Antoinette de Bourbon-Parme
- House: Bourbon-Parma
- Father: Philip, Duke of Parma
- Mother: Louise-Élisabeth of France

Isabella of Bourbon-Parma (Spanish: Isabel María Luisa Antonieta, German: Isabella Maria Ludovica Antonia, French: Isabelle-Marie-Louise-Antoinette; 31 December 1741 – 27 November 1763) was a princess of Parma and infanta of Spain from the House of Bourbon-Parma as the daughter of Philip, Duke of Parma, and Louise-Élisabeth of France. She became an archduchess of Austria and crown princess of Bohemia and Hungary in 1760 by her marriage to Archduke Joseph of Austria, the future Joseph II, Holy Roman Emperor (she never became empress due to her early death). As a granddaughter of both King Louis XV of France and King Philip V of Spain, she was the first cousin of future French kings Louis XVI, Louis XVIII, and Charles X, and the first cousin of the future Spanish king Charles IV of Spain.

Secretly an Enlightenment thinker, she was a prolific writer on philosophy, religion, ethics, politics, diplomacy, military theory, world trade, education and childrearing, human culture and societies, and the position of women. In secret essays, she argued for the intellectual equality of women. None of her writings were published in her life. Her Méditations chrétiennes (“Christian Meditations”) were published in 1764, the year after her death. Some of her personal correspondence and other works have been published by biographers and historians.

Although her husband loved her, she did not fully return his feelings and found more fulfillment in her (likely romantic, possibly sexual) relationship with her sister-in-law, Archduchess Maria Christina. Despite her popularity at the Viennese court, she was unhappy because of the guilt of being unable to reciprocate her husband's feelings, compounded by the same-sex attraction that she considered sinful. A lonely childhood with demanding and unaffectionate caretakers, the sudden loss of her mother, a difficult birth and two miscarriages in the span of ten months, and later a fourth pregnancy all adversely affected her physical and mental health. She was described as melancholic and experienced suicidal ideation. Biographers have suggested that she suffered from depression or bipolar disorder, to which she was likely genetically predisposed. She died at the age of 21 from smallpox.

== Early life ==
=== Birth and family ===
Infanta Isabel María Luisa Antonieta (Note: She was christened Maria Elisabetha Ludovica Antonia, the Latin version of her names. In childhood, she was known as Doña Isabel or Isabelita; in adulthood, as Isabelle. Formally, she signed her name as Isabelle-Marie-Louise (French) or Isabella Maria Ludovica (German), never using Antonia, Antoine, or Antoinette. On her tomb, she is named as Elisabetha Maria.) of Spain was born on 31 December 1741 at Buen Retiro Palace in Madrid as the first child of Infante Philip of Spain and his wife, Louise-Élisabeth of France (known as “Madame Infante”), both from the House of Bourbon.

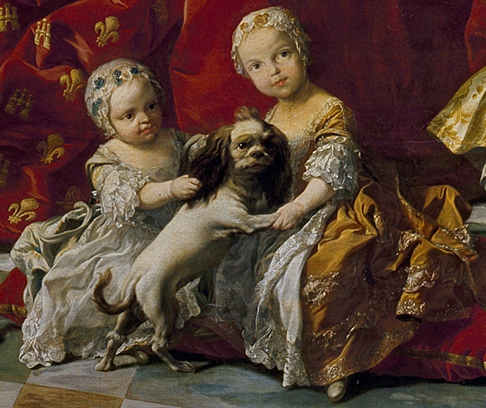
Isabella (right) with her cousin Maria Isabel Ana of Naples and Sicily on The Family of Philip V by Louis Michel van Loo.

Isabella's parents were first cousins once removed with an age difference of six years (her mother had been twelve and her father eighteen years old when they married). Madame Infante was the eldest daughter of Louis XV of France and Queen Marie Leszczyńska. She and her contemporaries thought that she should only marry a (future) monarch, yet the Infante Philip was only Philip V of Spain's third son. Madame Infante was ambitious and strong-willed, unlike her husband. She worked through her international connections to secure a higher position for herself and her husband and more power for the Bourbons as a whole. She had a contentious relationship with her mother-in-law Elisabeth Farnese, the de facto ruler of Spain, whom she threatened in her influence over her son, but they worked together to advance the Infante Philip's career.

Madame Infante was fourteen years old when she gave birth to Isabella. The delivery was difficult and lasted for two days. Two months later, Philip left to fight in the War of the Austrian Succession. He did not see his family again until Isabella was eight years old, although he kept up an intensive correspondence with his wife and mother, learning about his daughter from them.

=== Early life in Madrid ===
For the first seven years of her life, Isabella was raised at the Madrid court of her paternal grandparents. Her grandmother, Queen Elisabeth, loved her, reporting regularly on her well-being, development, and behaviour to her absent son. Based on these letters, her mother never displayed affection towards Isabella, whom she found “stubborn” and “unbearable”. She was impatient with her, and if Isabella threw tantrums, Madame Infante chastised her so severely that Queen Elisabeth called it a “military drill”. Isabella was raised by an aya (governess), the French-born widow Marie-Catherine de Bassecourt-Grigny, Marquise of Gonzalez (later suo jure marquise of Borghetto; 1693–1770). The Marquise retained a strong sense of etiquette and hierarchy from her previous position as dame d'honneur to Isabella's aunt by marriage, Barbara of Portugal. Isabella developed a close bond with her aya, which inspired jealousy in her mother.

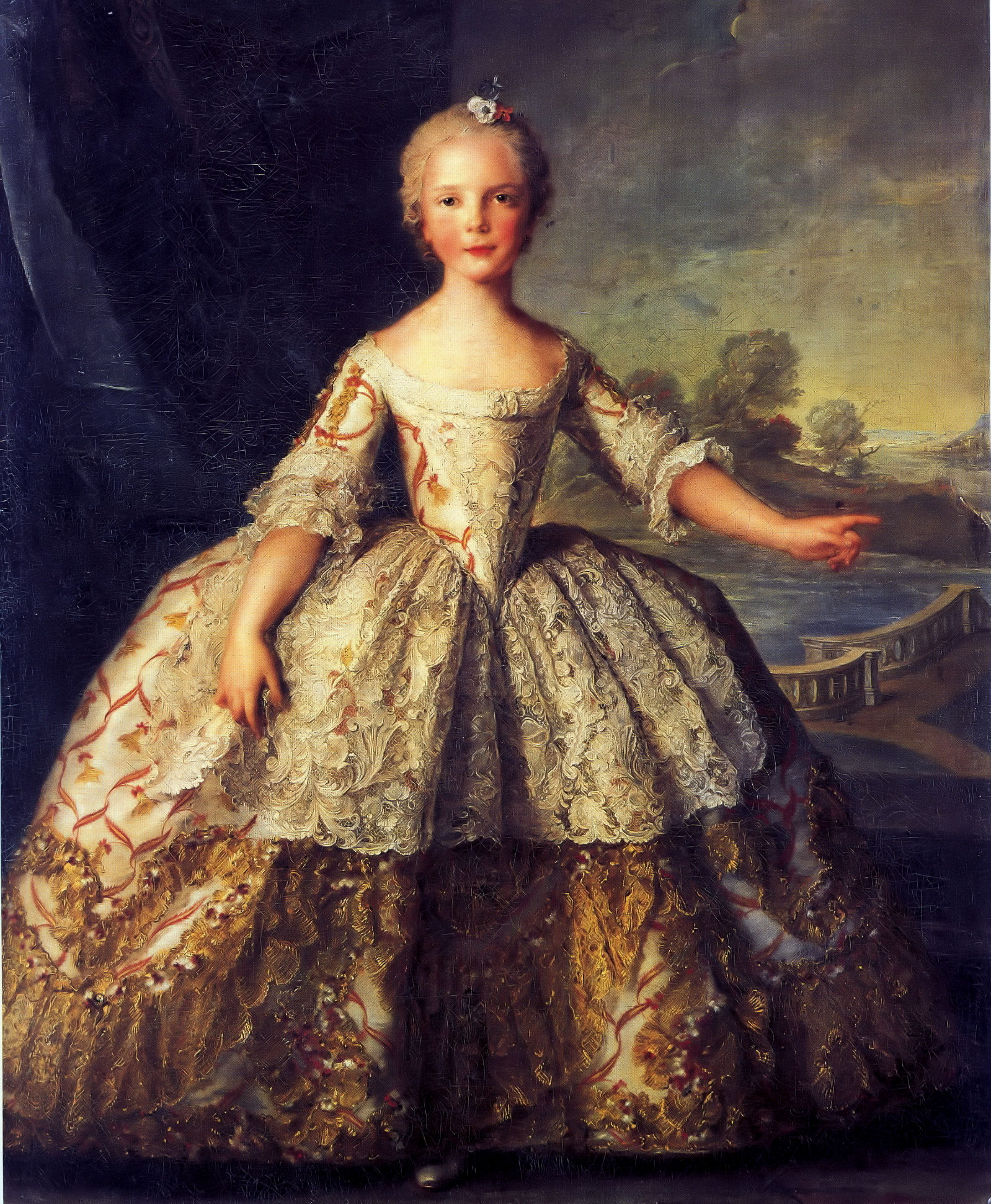
Isabella in 1749, at the age of seven in a portrait by Jean-Marc Nattier painted during her stay in Versailles.

Isabella's education was structured around contemporary ideals for princesses. The use of corporal punishment was ordered by her father and endorsed by her mother. According to a work by her that is probably autobiographical in part, she appers to have been an energetic and mischievous child. The character, l'Étourderie (“Amazement”) personified, that she wrote about as an adult, was always loud, “jumping, climbing, falling”, breaking furniture and ornaments as a child. Her favourite pastimes were chasing after butterflies, horse-riding, and performing stunts with a rope, but she also liked to write, sing, and draw. Because her behaviour was considered unsuitable, her governess forbade her access to ropes, horses, and swings. “What to do in this sad situation? [...] But I eventually learned to be reasonable”, Isabella commented, writing as l'Étourderie. She started to entertain herself silently, later recalling that her head was “always in the clouds, occupying itself with a hundred thousand ideas at once”. Badinter argues that these scenes reveal the character and difficulties of Isabella as a young child, and Seth agrees that the work is at least somewhat autobiographical. In 1746, when Isabella was four, a French envoy complimented her “dignity”, saying that she already knew “who she is, to whom she belongs, and what she must be one day”. He also remarked on the coldness of Madame Infante towards Isabella. Growing up as an only child until the age of ten with no playmates and under strict control, her childhood has been characterised as “lonely and austere” by Élisabeth Badinter.

=== Visit to Versailles ===
Between 6 January and 7 October 1749, Isabella lived in Versailles, visiting her maternal family on her way to Parma. As the then-only grandchild of Louis XV and Marie Leszczyńska, she received more attention and affection than ever before. The luxury and cheerfulness of the French court was a shock compared to the rigidity of Spanish courtly customs. Aged eight, she participated in court functions fully and attended the theatre, the opera, balls, and concerts. Paul d'Albert de Luynes recorded that she did not seem to enjoy these and was considered “timid”. At this time, Isabella was more comfortable speaking Spanish (which she had learned from her aya) than French (which she had always used with her mother and paternal grandmother).

With time, Isabella started to enjoy her stay. She liked to accompany Queen Marie to operas, plays, and concerts, and she was delighted by being treated as a French royal princess: the royal guard saluted her, and she was seated in an identical armchair to that of her mother and aunts. Once, she performed in a play in the apartment of Dauphine Maria Josepha of Saxony to general acclaim. After her stay in Versailles, she corresponded with her maternal family until the end of her life and her primary language had become French.

[The French] are lively and stay so to the grave. [...] Their books are witty, their conversations also; few nations are so gifted in this. Their spirit is brilliant and full of fire, it is capable of designing anything with promptness and accuracy, it is vast, it understands everything, it is precise, few things escape it, it is inventive in every way.

— Isabella of Parma, Réflexions sur l'éducation, quotes Badinter (2008)

=== Adolescence in Parma ===
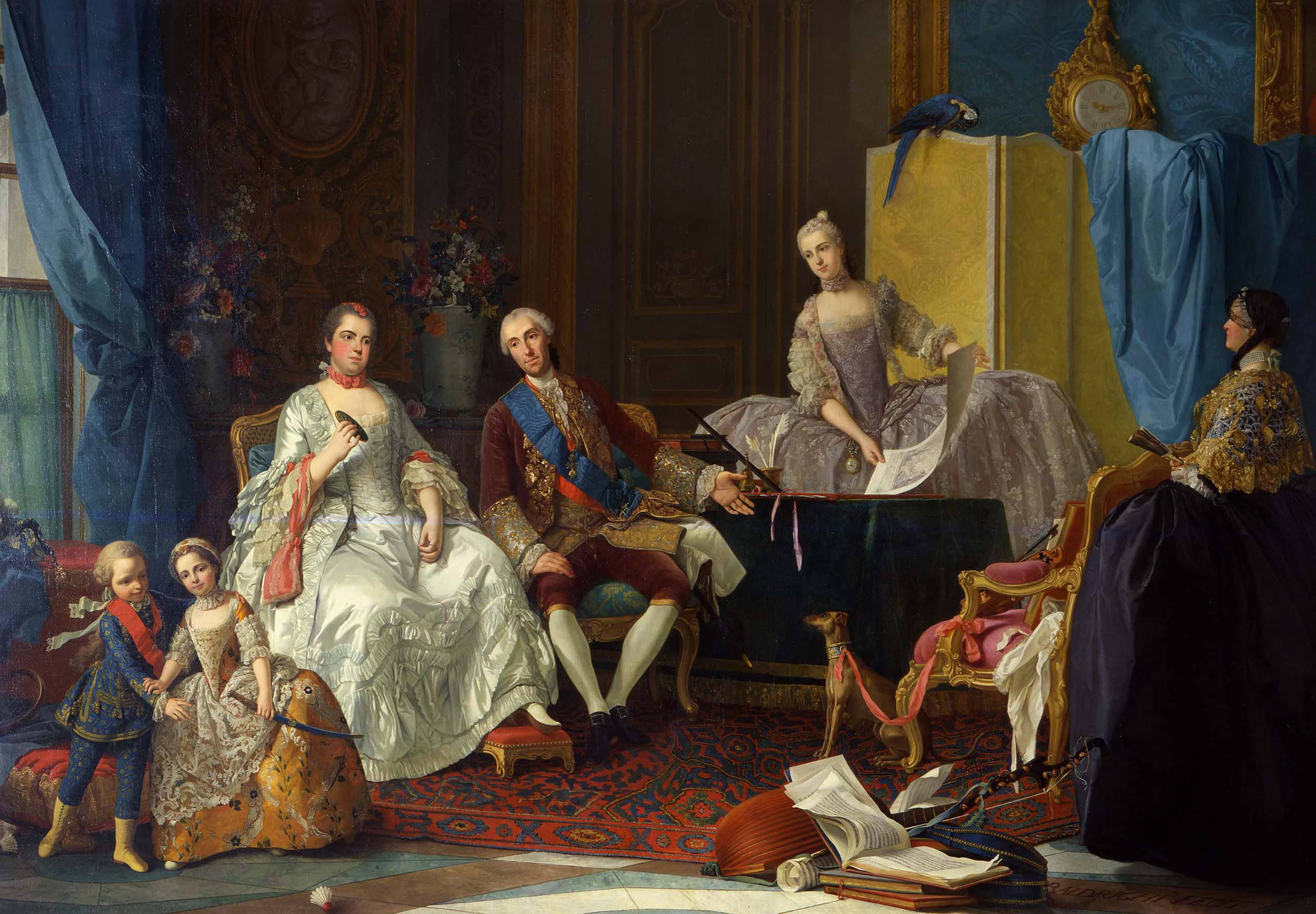
Isabella (standing, in a light purple dress) with her family in 1757, at the age of 16.

With the 1748 Treaty of Aix-la-Chapelle, Isabella's father became duke of Parma, a title formerly belonging to his mother's family. Isabella and her mother arrived in Parma on 20 November 1749. The duchy was impoverished, its palaces in ruins. Whereas Isabella thought highly of Spaniards and the French, she considered Italians to be “ignorant of the art of thinking” and immediately wanted to leave.

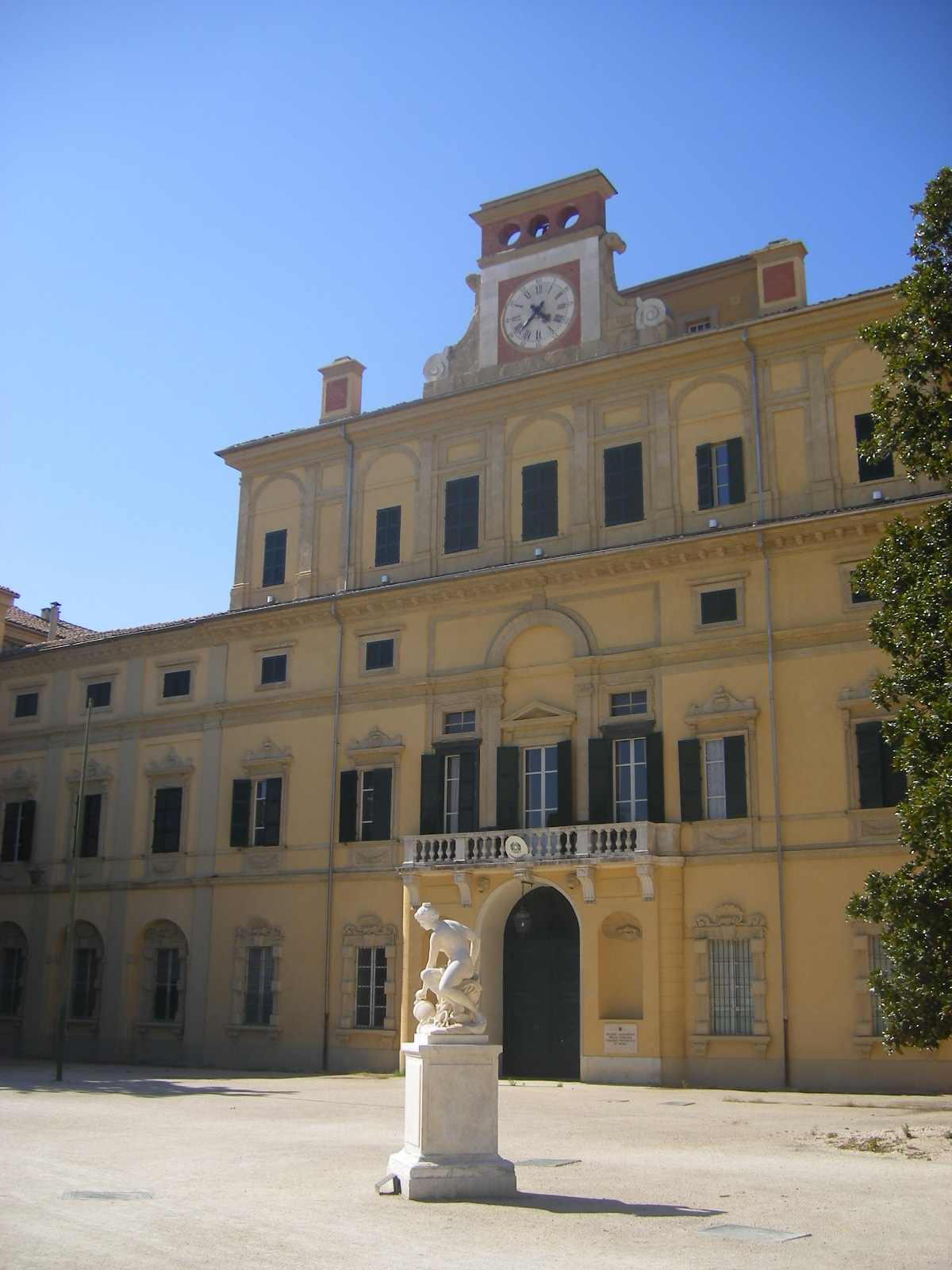
Isabella's home in Parma, the Palazzo del Giardino.

Isabella's parents had two children in 1751: Ferdinand on 20 January and Luisa on 9 December, to whom their mother showed more affection. Isabella seems not to have been jealous and to have enjoyed having company. Her mother, resenting her low status and relative poverty, focussed on arranging prestigious marriages for her children. She visited Versailles twice to negotiate a match for Isabella, first between August 1752 and October 1753, then in the summer of 1757, when she died. Both times, her husband and children stayed in Parma.

During Madame Infante's absences, Isabella reported on her siblings' well-being to their father and maternal grandmother. The Infante Philip lived apart from his children for seven months every year to be closer to the best hunting grounds in the Ducal Palace of Colorno. Isabella sent short notes to him on the sleeping habits and teething of the two infants. Between November and April, Philip lived with his younger children in the Palazzo della Pilotta and Isabella stayed with her aya in the Palazzo del Giardino.

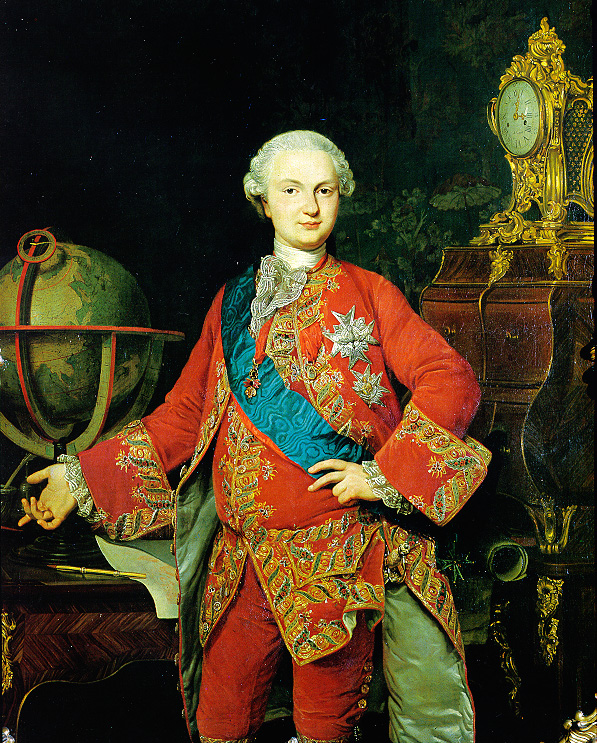
Ferdinand, Isabella's brother on a portrait from between 1765 and 1769.

While Isabella certainly exchanged letters with her mother, these have been lost. Around this time, her French friends questioned Madame Infante about her coldness towards her eldest child. She replied that her own “character was too serious” to “make a friend of [her] daughter” and she believed that Isabella should be “satisfied” with the affection shown to her Madame Infante's “cold nature” did not allow for more. The Marshal of France, Adrien-Maurice de Noailles, officially urged Madame Infante to show more love to Isabella as it was feared that rumours about her cold treatment could diminish the chances of a politically advantageous marriage. The French ambassador to Parma assured Noailles that more attention was being paid to Isabella, while Madame Infante protested that “all the world must see […] how much I love her. For those who know me, it is certain”.

==== Education ====
In the summer of 1749, Isabella's parents hired Pierre Cerou, an educated French comedy writer and tutor to manage their property and instruct Isabella in history, literature, and French. The Madrid court was concerned about Cerou's religiosity, and at their request he was replaced by a French Jesuit, Thomas Fumeron in 1754. Fumeron, however, was assigned to Ferdinand, not Isabella. From then on, she did not officially have a teacher. In 1757 and 1758 respectively, a governor and a tutor were hired for Ferdinand: Auguste de Keralio, a soldier and scientist, and Étienne Bonnot, Abbot of Condillac, a philosopher and close friend of Rousseau, Diderot, and d'Alembert. Isabella was instructed by her confessors, Fathers Fumeron and Belgrado, in the lives of the saints. She continued to practice drawing, painting, and music with her aya. She excelled at singing and playing the violin and the harpsichord. While there is no proof that she attended lectures by Keralion and Condillac, Badinter argues that her later knowledge of military theory, history, and Enlightenment ideals shows that she did. She was certainly exposed to Enlightenment ideas in Parma, where her father was engaged in an extensive project of modernisation with the help of Keralio, Bonnot de Condillac, and Alexandre Deleyre, the court librarian.

Isabella probably witnessed the cruelty of Keralio and Condillac, especially the latter, towards her brother. Despite his progressive idea of teaching through games and his reputation as a revolutionary pedagogue, he regularly beat Ferdinand with a rod or kicked him. In her Réflexions sur l'éducation, Isabella would condemn the way her brother had been raised, anonymously depicting both him and Condillac. She maintained a correspondence with Keralio in her adulthood, but rarely mentioned the Abbot.

== Life in Vienna ==
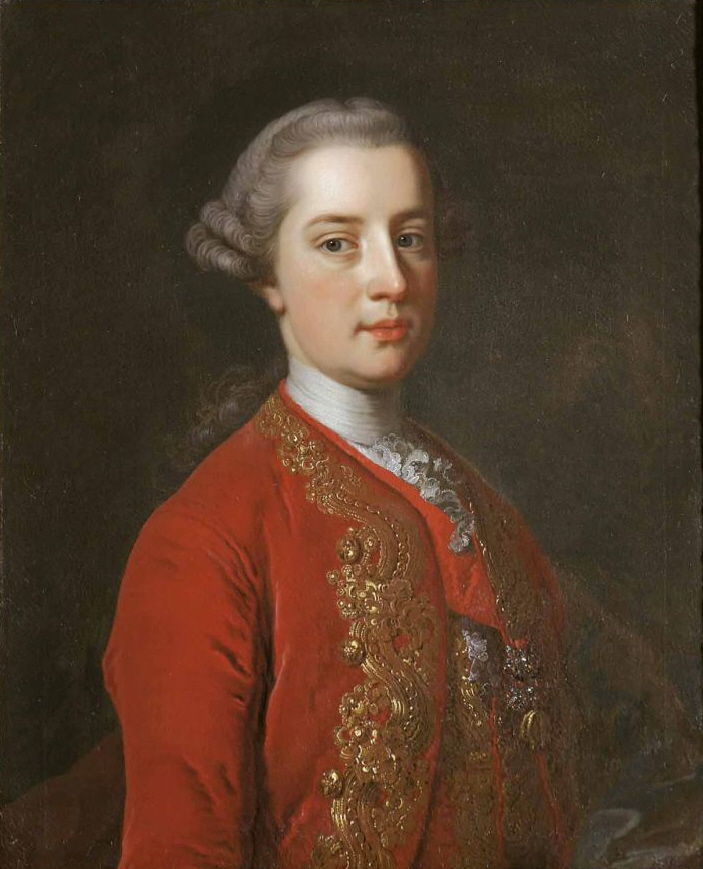
Archduke Joseph in 1755.

=== Marriage with Archduke Joseph ===
==== Background ====
The family policy of Maria Theresa, Holy Roman Empress was intended to strengthen the relationship between the Bourbons and the Habsburgs. In 1756, influenced by Madame de Pompadour, Louis XV decided to shift alliances and join Austria against Great-Britain and Prussia in the Diplomatic Revolution. Maria Theresa's eldest son and heir, Joseph, was unenthusiastic about marriage because of his low opinion of women. He relied completely on his mother to choose a bride. In the aftermath of the alliance between Austria and France, Joseph's betrothal to Isabella's cousin, Maria Luisa of Spain, was broken off with the excuse that he had fallen in love with Isabella, although the decision was a political one made by his mother. On the bride's side, negotiations were led by Madame Infante. On 30 April 1759, she reported to her husband that the betrothal had been made. Eight months later, on 6 December, aged thirty-two, Madame Infante died of smallpox in France, devastating her daughter. Isabella might have become convinced at this time that she was to die within four years. She repeatedly stated that she would die before turning twenty-two.

After the betrothal, the parties decided to wait so that the young couple could mature. Madame Infante's death further delayed the plans. Isabella started to learn German, devoting seven hours a day to it. Isabella was anxious to please her future mother-in-law, and she prepared methodically for her future: she studied the political situation of the Habsburg monarchy and followed its ongoing war with Prussia closely. To please her new family, she was ready to pretend and manipulate. Meanwhile, Joseph wrote to a friend that he would try to win his bride's “respect and trust”, but he considered it impossible to “pose as a lover”, which would go against his “nature” that had never understood romantic love. Thoughts of his approaching wedding made him “tremble” and feel melancholic.

I am extremely worried about my future happiness; I am certainly not entering this [married] state out of curiosity or bestial lust; only the thought of duty brings me to this, which costs me infinitely and disgusts me. [...] A victim of the State, I am sacrificing myself, hoping that God will repay me...

— Archduke Joseph of Austria, personal letter, quotes Badinter (2008)

==== Wedding ====
Wedding festivities as depicted by van Meytens

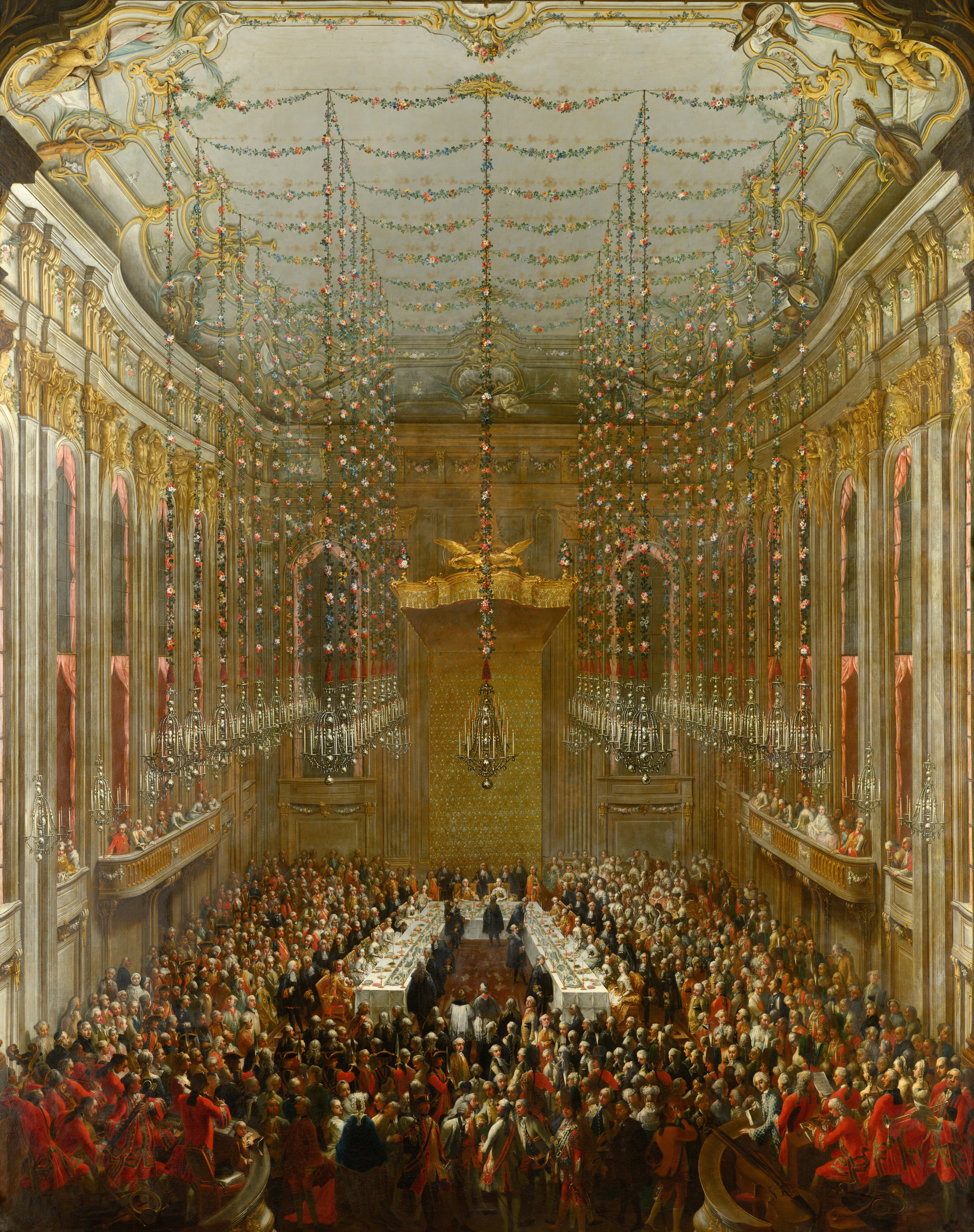
The public wedding supper and banquet in the Redoute Wing of the Hofburg. Only the imperial family is seated, with the emperor and the empress in the middle, Joseph on their right and Isabella on the left.

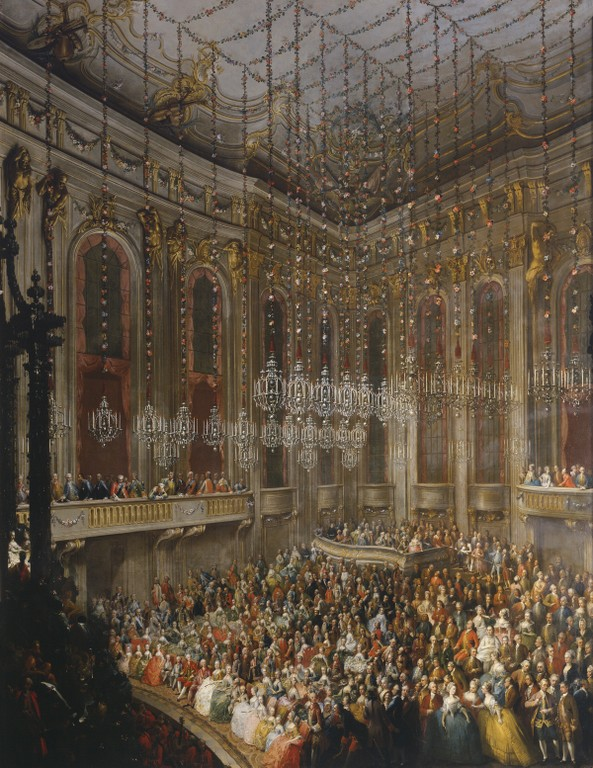
A serenade in the same place. The imperial family is seated in the first row with a young Wolfgang Amadeus Mozart. In reality, the composer was not present at the time, only arriving in Vienna two years later, in 1762.

Following a marriage by proxy, Isabella was sent to Vienna in the company of Joseph Wenzel I, Prince of Liechtenstein in late 1760. While she was sad to say goodbye to her family, she was happy to leave Parma. Maria Theresa refused to let anyone of her former staff accompany her. Publicly, Isabella disguised her sadness, but she cried in private with her father, siblings, confessor, and aya. She travelled through the Alps and was greeted at the border by her Oberhofmeisterin, the widowed Countess Erdődy, Antónia Battyhány. They reached a castle near Vienna on 1 October, where they were received by Isabella's father-in-law Francis I, Holy Roman Emperor.

The Emperor accompanied Isabella to Laxenburg castles to meet the rest of the imperial family. Her fiancé, who had declared multiple times that he was more afraid of marriage than of battles, reportedly turned red upon seeing her and could not wait for the wedding. While this might be an exaggeration, Isabella quickly seduced Joseph by her obedience and by letting him feel intellectually superior. Maria Theresa declared Isabella “perfect”, and it was generally agreed that she surpassed expectations. The French foreign minister Étienne François de Choiseul, Duke of Choiseul, present in Vienna at the time, reported that the bride had a “superior gift for making people love her”. The only person who disliked her was her eldest sister-in-law, Archduchess Maria Anna, who was displaced by Isabella as second lady of the court. Sidelined by her family, she felt jealous of the newcomer's popularity.

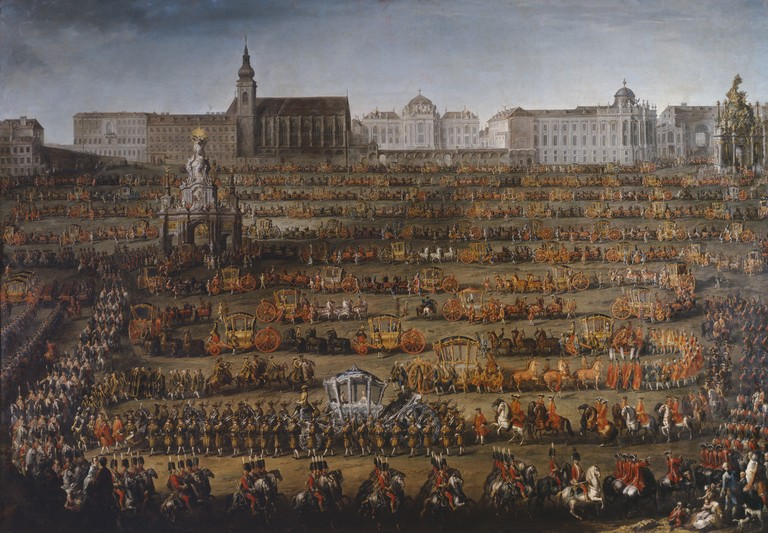
An allegoric depiction of the wedding procession by Martin van Meytens. The square shown here did not exist, and existing houses were left off the picture to showcase the procession.

The wedding was celebrated in the Augustinekirche by Nuncio Vitaliano Borromeo on 6 October. At night, there was a display of decorative lighting with almost three thousand lanterns burning between the Hofburg and the Stephansdom and the same amount of white wax candles in two lines, complete with torches in the courtyard of the palace. In the Hofburg, there was a public banquet where the pure golden tableware from Isabella's dowry was used. Festivities lasted for days and were commemorated in a series of paintings by Martin van Meytens, which can be viewed in the Hall of Ceremonies in Schönbrunn Palace as of 2026. This was organised despite the ongoing Seven Years' War draining the treasury, as Maria Theresa wished to distract attention and display the wealth of her empire.

==== Married life and relationship with her husband ====
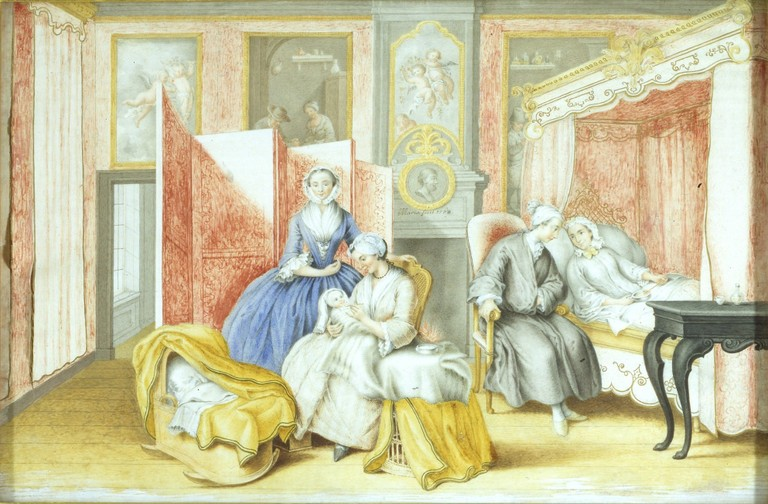
Joseph at Isabella's bedside after the birth of their daughter Maria Theresa. He was beside her throughout the delivery.

Joseph fell in love with Isabella and behaved attentively, but she did not reciprocate his feelings. It was considered her duty to produce an heir as quickly as possible and she became pregnant in late 1761. This caused her anxiety, but she was relieved that she did not cause disappointment. She worried that she would be unable to endure the pain of childbirth, but behaved in the expected way, with 'no sensitivity nor grimacing' according to Maria Theresa.

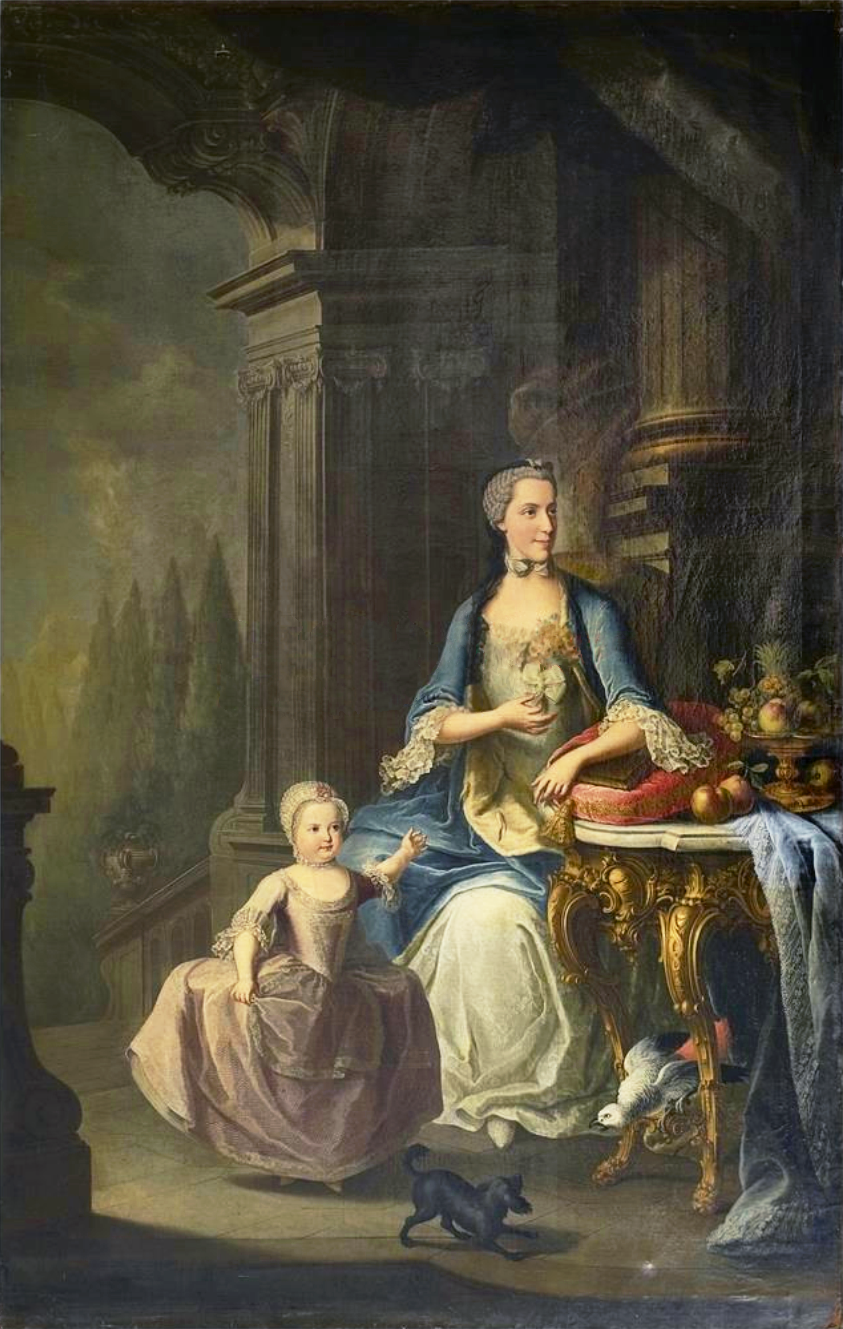
Isabella with her daughter Maria Theresa.

Her pregnancy was difficult with many physical symptoms, depression, and a fear of death, worsened by her husband not understanding her problems. On 20 March 1762, she gave birth to Archduchess Maria Theresa (named after her paternal grandmother). How Isabella felt about her child is unknown, but she only mentioned her once in her intimate correspondence and never in her private writings. A friend commented that her love for her child “did not show much on the exterior”.

She miscarried in August 1762 and in January 1763. The second miscarriage was kept secret, but Maria Theresa and Joseph were “in great distress” according to the French ambassador, who wrote that Isabella was “in good health” but remained bedridden for days. Maria Theresa advised Joseph to wait for six months before trying again for a son so that Isabella could recover. Her miscarriages worsened Isabella's depression and eroded her will to live; the risks of childbirth aggravated her death anxiety. In early March 1763, it was reported in France that she was psychologically unwell, still grieving her last miscarriage, and displaying physical symptoms: she was “extremely thin”, had a “dry cough” that was “almost constant”, and she experienced pain in her sides. It was concluded that her health was “seriously threatened” and her “soul” needed to be “calmed”.

Meanwhile, the love of her husband and mother-in-law for her grew, and it seems that Isabella found a maternal figure in the Empress. She appears to have hidden her independence and revolutionary opinions well, being submissive towards both her husband and her mother-in-law. Biographers describe her as living a “double life” as both a “liberated intellectual” and a “submissive young wife”. Despite her personal doubts, contemporaries considered her to behave as expected, and she had an “acute sense of duty” in her role as a princess.

Thanks to God, our dear and charming daughter has recovered well and is in good health. In ten months of time, she gave birth and had two miscarriages. That is being too diligent. I wish therefore that she rest for six months to regain her strength. I ask you not to show her any desire of having a grandson. She is too used to obeying.

— Maria Theresa, letter to the Duke of Parma, 18 January 1763,

=== Relationship with Archduchess Maria Christina ===
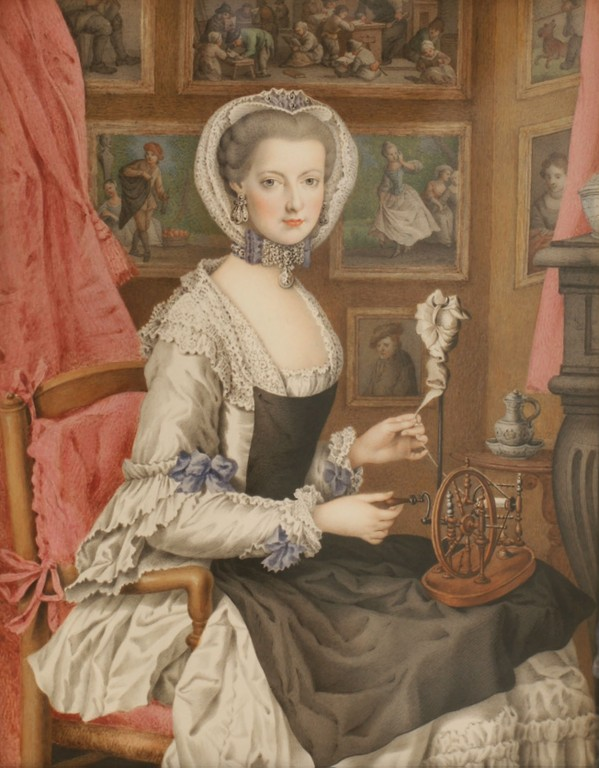
Marie on a self-portrait from 1765.

Her sister-in-law, Archduchess Maria Christina (known as Marie) was Isabella's best friend and only confidante in Vienna. Marie was the third surviving child of the imperial couple, less than five months younger than Isabella, and the Empress' favourite. She was intelligent and artistically inclined. The two quickly developed a close relationship, spending so much time together that they earned a comparison with Orpheus and Eurydice. Despite living in the same palace, they exchanged letters and small notes daily, which Freyermuth connects to the popularity of intimate correspondence and epistolary novels at the time. Two hundred pieces of correspondence by Isabella survived (those by Marie were burned after her death).

It seems that Isabella soon became romantically and perhaps sexually attracted to Marie. The latter's feelings developed more gradually and remained more reserved. She was recovering from her love for Louis Eugene of Württemberg, whom she could not marry as Maria Theresa considered him socially inferior. Soon after Isabella's arrival, in October or November 1760, she started to playfully court Marie, writing that “love, that cruel god, torment[ed]” her and that death “would be surely sweet”, except for not being able to love Marie anymore. In the beginning of their relationship, she addressed Marie formally, calling her “my lady my dear Sister”, but soon started calling her “my dear angel”, “my most precious treasure”, or “my consolation”. Marie's regular nicknames were mon Alte (“my old [one]”) and mon âne, mein Engerl, or Eserl (all words meaning donkey). She once asked Isabella to call her baadwaschl, Viennese slang for washcloth, an object with erotic connotations. Isabelle regularly portrayed the two of them as a heterosexual couple (for example, Marie as Eurydice and herself as Orpheus or as couples from popular contemporary comedies). She called herself the “lover” (amant) of Mimi. Isabella combined the superlatives fashionable at the time between close friends with genuine signs of her obsession and adoration for Marie.

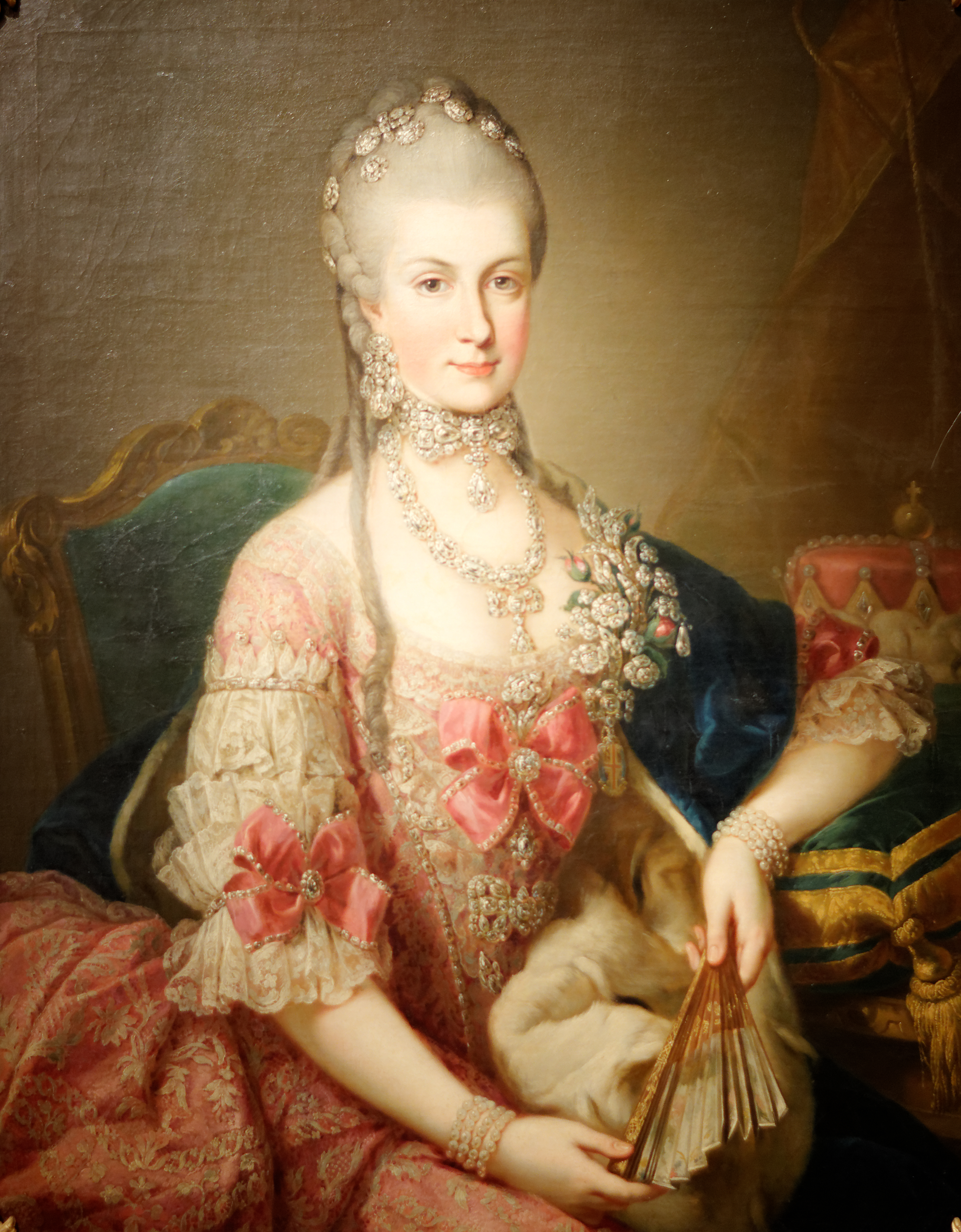
Marie on a 1762 portrait attributed to Martin van Meytens

The two women agreed to meet in hidden places and Isabella wrote short notes to Marie during mass. They gifted each other close stools and Isabella commented that she hoped Marie would think of her each time she used it. If the weather prevented Joseph from going on a hunt, the sisters-in-law cancelled their meeting in hurried, disappointed notes. They were worried to keep their relationship a secret; in March 1761, Isabella reminded Marie of her “given word” to never talk about something (she does not specify what), because “there is nothing in the world as shameful as going against nature”.

Marie seems to have been more reserved than Isabella, but she did return her feelings. Their shared perception of homosexuality as sinful led to feelings of guilt. Isabella felt ashamed for not reciprocating the love of her husband, which worsened her depression and suicidality. She wrote to Marie that “only the Almighty knows how gladly I would part with this life, in which grievance is inflicted upon Him daily”. After Marie's death, a miniature of Isabella and her daughter was found in her prayer book. On its back, she had written the date and cause of Isabella's death, calling her the “best and truest friend” who had “lived as an angel and died as [an angel]”.

Before her death, Isabella admitted to her mother-in-law that not “everything was viewable” for Joseph among her papers. The Empress asked Countess Erdődy, Isabella's chief lady-in-waiting, to burn her writings, calling it the “greatest service” she would ever do for the dynasty. It is unknown why this did not happen, but many of Isabella's academic and personal writings survived. The letters Isabella had written to her remained among Marie's papers. Her husband, Albert Casimir, Duke of Teschen, understood them as proof of an “exceptional friendship”. As of 2026, the letters are in the National Archives of Hungary. They were partially published by Alfred Ritter von Arneth, archivist of the Habsburg papers, in the late 19^{th} century. Another censored edition was included in Joseph Hrasky's 1959 Die Persönlichkeit der Infantin von Parma, 'The Personality of the Infanta of Parma'. In 2008, Élisabeth Badinter published the full preserved correspondence with annotations.

==== Appraisal of relationship by scholars ====
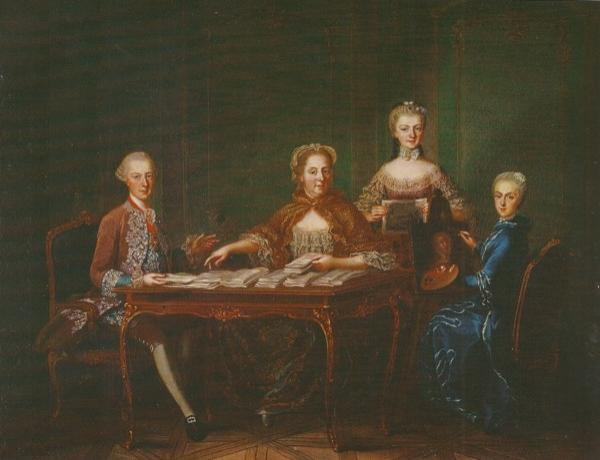
Isabella with her husband, mother-in-law, and sister-in-law Marie.

While early historians dismissed the language of the letters as a fashionable expression of friendship, later it became consensus that the two had a romantic, possibly sexual affair. Badinter argues that characteristics considered part of romantic and/or sexual relationships both in the 18^{th} century and today—such as possessiveness, pain over being separated, an “obsession with the beloved”, jealousy, and dependency on each other—were apparent in their correspondence. In her Traité sur les hommes, Isabella states that while no man can live without women, any woman could live without men, which suggest that she may not have been attracted to men.

Freyermuth argues that most of the expressions employed by Isabella were regular in sophisticated correspondence at the time. For example, Isabella used aimer à la rage, “to love to the point of madness”, for both Marie and her Oberhofmeisterin, Countess Erdődy. Freyermuth nevertheless agrees with other biographers that the letters convey a “visceral need” for intimate proximity and an “exclusive passion”, especially by their frequency (often multiple letters a day). She notes that Isabella used an “ambiguous” mix of words denoting platonic and romantic love to disguise her attraction. Whenever she used verbs with sexual or romantic connotations, she would neutralise them with ones appropriate to friendship: “I yearn [je languis d'] for love [amour], for friendship [amitié], as you wish, and forever”. She relied on the indefinite French pronoun on (“one”) to make her declarations impersonal: “when one sees you [on vous voit], one can no longer be [on ne plus peut être] occupied by anything but your charms”. Freyermuth argues that even though 18^{th} century Europeans discussed bodily symptoms considerably more freely than in the 21^{st} century, the way in which Isabella described her diarrhea after giving birth (“I shat [chié] all over [my chemise]”) suggests that the two were physically, probably sexually intimate.

A selection of quotes by Isabella in letters to Marie cited by Badinter as supporting a love affair
French original or *French translation of German original by Badinter	English translation
Je vous aime à l'adoration et mon bonheur est de vous aimer et d'être assurée de vous.	I love you to the point of worship and my happiness is loving you and being certain of you[r love].
Je suis amoureuse de toi comme une folle, saintement ou diaboliquement, je vous aime et aimerai jusqu'au tombeau.	I love thee like a madwoman, in a holy way or diabolically, I love you and will love you to the grave.
Je suis très disposée à vous étouffer à force de caresses.	I am quite inclined to smother you with caresses.
Vous me faites tourner la tête [...] Je suis dans l'état le plus violent, la sueur me coule sur le front, je suis sans haleine...	You make my head spin [...] I am in the most violent state, sweat runs down my forehead, I am breathless...
Je vous baise de toutes mes forces, mais plus avec le menton.	I kiss you with all my might, but no longer with my chin.
Je vous baise tout ce que vous laissez baiser.	I kiss all that you let me kiss.
Il pourrait bien arriver que nous nous embrassions jusqu'à épuisement.	It could very well happen that we kiss each other to [deadly] exhaustion.
Je baise ton petit cul d'archange.*	I kiss thine archangelic little ass.
Je baise votre adorable cul en me gardant bien de vous offrir le mien qui est un peu foireux.	I kiss your lovely ass while being careful not to offer you mine, which is a bit of a mess.
[Mon] visage est un peu malade, mais votre place favorite ne [l'est pas].	[My] face is a little sick, but your favourite place is not.
Tout ce qui m'occupe à cette heure, c'est de dire si je pouvais seulement la voir, quelle douceur ne serait-ce pas, quel bonheur, quelle satisfaction intérieure ne ressentirais-je pas, si je pouvais seulement contempler ce nez tourné avec tant de grâce et d'attrait, qui m’a si souvent transportée, cette bouche si propre à consoler par ses baisers, ces yeux dont le langage est si touchant. [...] J'oublie où je suis, j'oublie ceux avec qui je suis. [...] Je ne pense qu'à ce nouveau désir que je cherche à satisfaire à quelque prix que cela soit.	All that occupies me at this hour is to say if I could only see her, what sweetness it would be, what happiness, what inner satisfaction I would feel, if I could only contemplate that nose turned with such grace and attractiveness, which has so often carried me away, that mouth so suited to console with its kisses, those eyes whose language is so touching. [...] I forget where I am, I forget those with whom I am. [...] I think only of this new desire that I seek to satisfy whatever the price may be.

==== Relationship with Archduchess Maria Anna ====
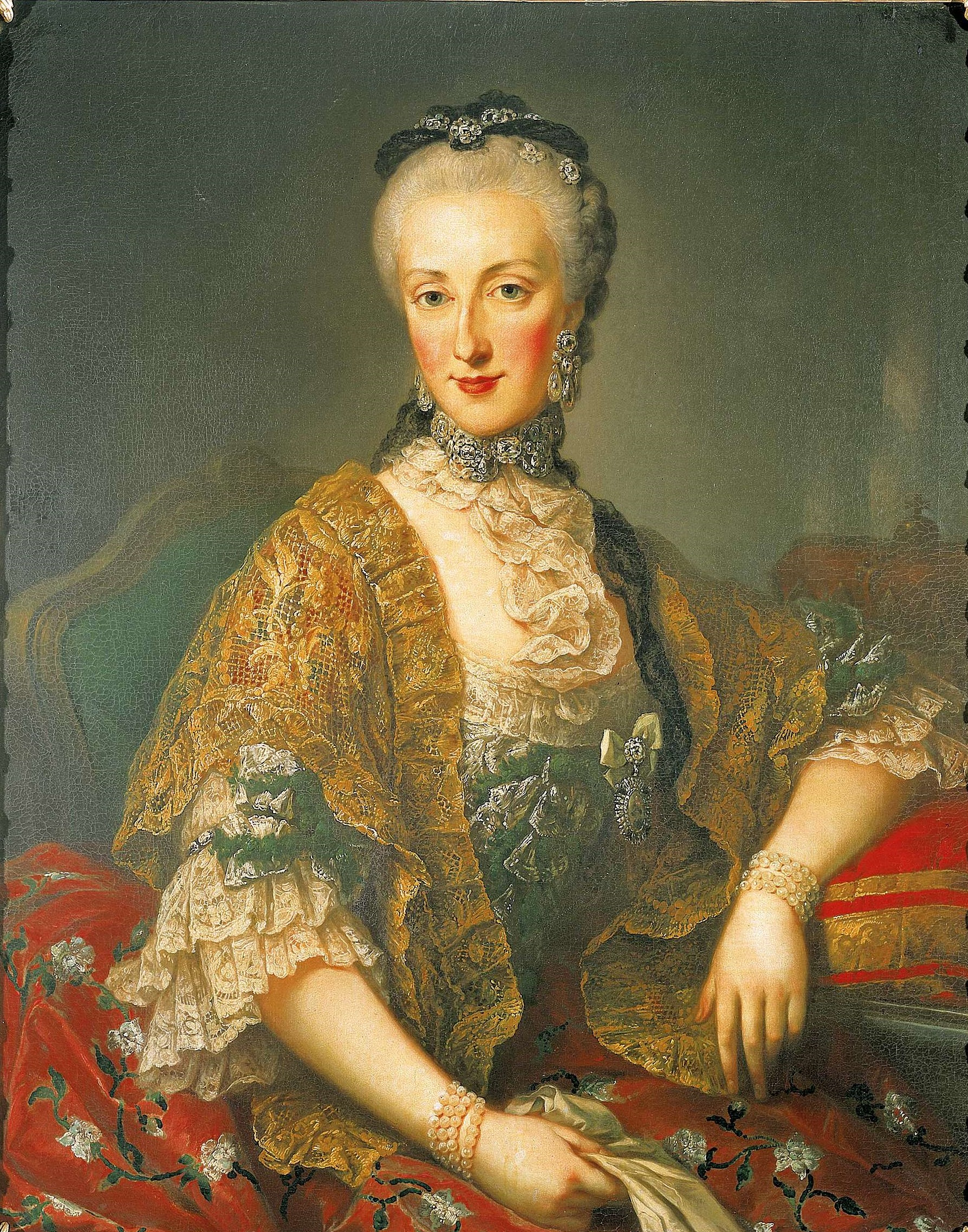
Marianne on a contemporary portrait.

While most of her family loved her, her relationship with her eldest sister-in-law, Archduchess Maria Anna (known as Marianne), only deteriorated. Isabella was seen as beautiful, while Marianne was considered the least attractive archduchess; Isabella was popular, while Marianne was ignored by her mother and siblings. Studying sciences had been Marianne's refuge from her lonely and contentious family life, an interest over which she connected with her father; yet Isabella was famously intelligent and educated and Emperor Francis adored her. Being a good musician was the only one of Marianne's talents appreciated by her family, but Isabella was even considered the better singer and violinist. Motivated by jealousy and feelings of inferiority, Marianne viewed Isabella as a rival even before she arrived in Austria and received her coldly.

Isabella responded with distrust. She described Marianne as “duplicitous” and “hypocritical”, and wrote a short dissertation titled Les Charmes de la fausse amitié, 'The Charms of False Friendship' about her. The two nevertheless exchanged embraces, kisses, and compliments in public. Marianne seems to have been the only person to suspect the affair between Isabella and Marie, and she spied on them. Isabella often warned Marie to keep their letters safe from Marianne. Their coldness, turning into hostility, worsened the already distant relationship between Marianne and Joseph, who never forgave his sister for antagonising his wife. Later, as head of the family, he used his power to isolate Marianne and deprive her financially

== Death and aftermath ==
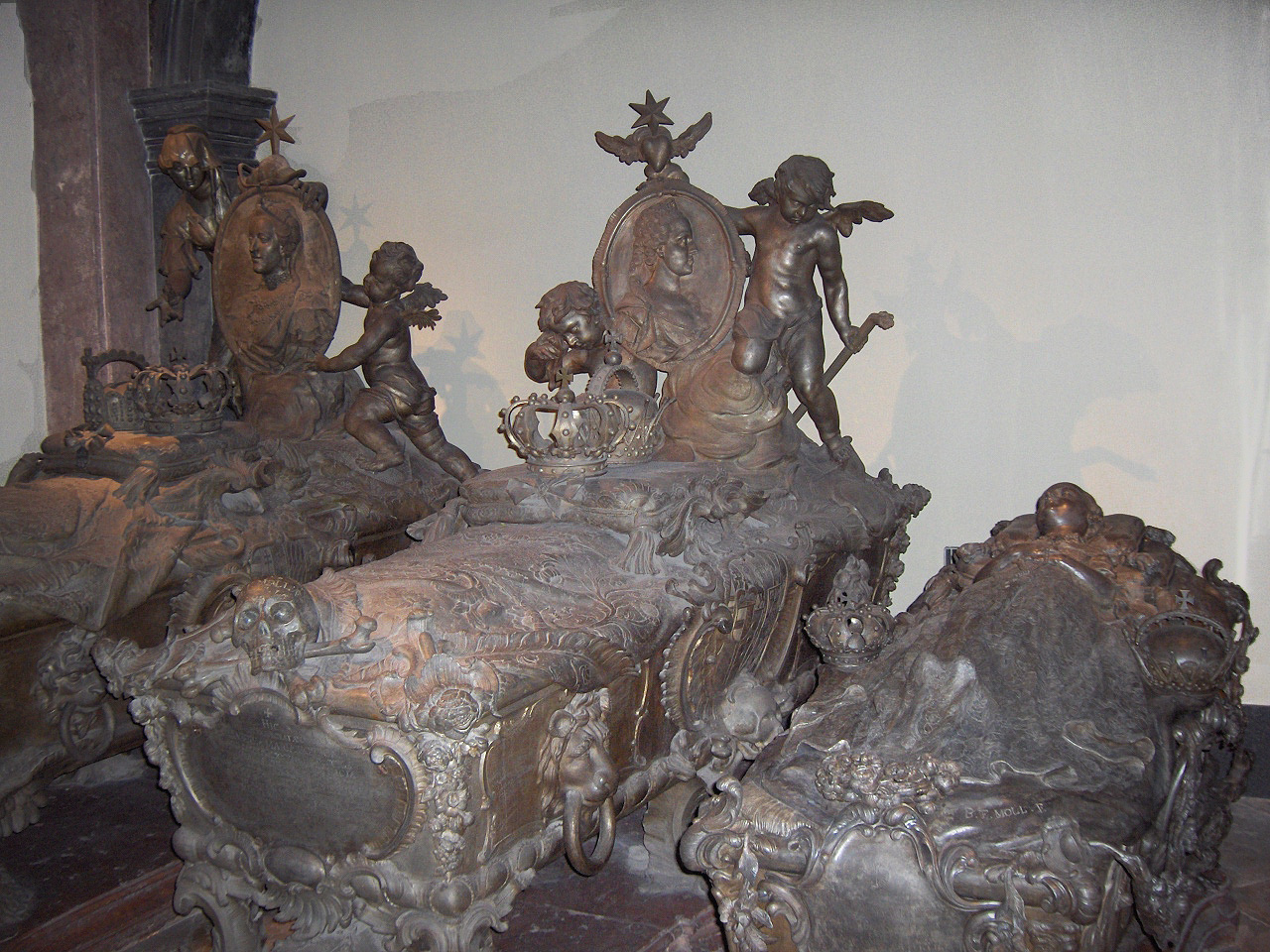
Isabella's tomb (center), with that of her daughter Christina underneath. In the foreground is the sarcophagus of her older daughter Maria Theresa, and in the background that of Joseph's second wife, Josepha.

The imperial court spent summers in Schönbrunn. In autumn 1763, it was recorded that Isabella did not want to move back to the Hofburg, their winter home. She was around six months pregnant and believed that she might be carrying twins, and smallpox cases were reported in Vienna. Her 22^{nd} birthday was approaching, and she had been certain for years that she would not live to see it. On 18 November, four days after her arrival in Vienna, Isabella developed a fever and was soon diagnosed with smallpox. Maria Theresa, who had been nursing her, was persuaded to leave her room, as she had not had the disease yet and thus could have caught it. Afterwards her husband Joseph and her eldest sisters-in-law Marianne and Marie took care of her. The fever induced labour, and on 22 November, she gave birth prematurely. On her request, the baby was baptised Maria Christina after her friend and possible lover Marie, but died the same day.

Following the birth, Isabella was rarely conscious and displayed a “courage” bordering on indifference to death. On 26 November, the doctors informed Joseph that his wife was dying, and she died on the next day at dawn, a month before her 22^{nd} birthday. As her body was still infectious, it was buried without an autopsy or embalming in the Maria Theresa Vault of the Imperial Crypt. The coffin of her daughter Maria Christina was placed beneath hers. Isabella's death contributed to Maria Theresa's 1768 decision to have younger members of the family variolated (three or four of the Empress' children had also died of the disease, while almost all other members of her family, including Maria Theresa herself, almost died of it). The practice subsequently became accepted in Austria.

I have lost everything. My adorable wife and only friend is no more. (...) What a frightful separation! Can I survive it? Yes, and only to be unhappy all my life. (...) There is nothing I will enjoy ever again.

— Archduke Joseph of Austria, letter to his father-in-law Philip, Duke of Parma, quotes Badinter (2008)

=== Impact on Joseph and Maria Christina ===
Joseph was devastated by Isabella's death and never fully recovered. He considered marrying Isabella's younger sister Luisa, but she was already engaged to Charles, Prince of Asturias (later Charles V of Spain). Under pressure from his mother, he married his second cousin Maria Josepha of Bavaria in 1765. Maria Josepha physically repulsed him, and he mistreated her despite her attempts to accommodate him. She died of smallpox after two years of marriage. He adored his only living child, Maria Theresa, who died of pleurisy in 1770, aged seven. Joseph, who was considered to have a difficult personality, changed positively during his marriage to Isabella, but after her death, he became even more sarcastic, easily irritable, and aggressive after her death than he had been before.

There is no record of Marie's reaction to Isabella's death. She took care of her daughter until she died in childhood. She married Prince Albert Casimir of Saxony in 1766 as the only one of Maria Theresa's children to be allowed to choose their own spouse. Later, she wrote that Isabella's death had been “to the great regret of all, but above all of me”.

What a loss to humanity such a princess [is]! What a disaster for the whole State, for the whole family, and for me, wretched one! She is incomparable! There has never been, there is not, there will never be such a princess or such a woman.

— Archduke Joseph of Austria, personal letter from 1763, quotes Seth (2013)

== Personality and appearance ==
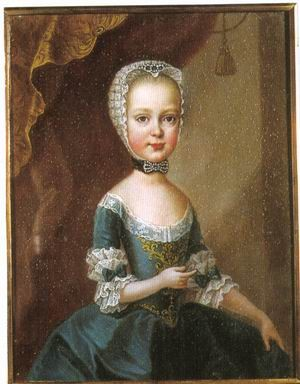
Isabella's daughter, Maria Theresa.

Isabella was interested in philosophy, morality, music, history, physics, and metaphysics. She was also artistically inclined: she painted, drew, sang, played the violin and the harpsichord with both enjoyment and talent, and wrote poems and studies. In 1758, French historian Pierre-Jean Grosley visited Parma and described Isabella as “one of the main wonders” of the city because of her “marked talent” in all “useful and pleasurable arts” and her “good knowledge of the world”. Freyermuth argues that the travels she undertook as a child and her diverse experiences in Spain, France, Parma, and later Austria stimulated her intellectual development and critical thinking skills.

During negotiations for her marriage, Austrian observers reported that Isabella spoke French, Spanish, Italian, and some Latin, studied sciences and maps, and followed military movements in Austria's ongoing Third Silesian War. She had also started to learn German. In a report commissioned by Maria Theresa, she was praised as “beautiful”, “kind”, and “dignified” but never “affected”, an “angel of beauty and goodness”. She liked to read but “did not wish to appear a savant”—she was able to express her intelligence and knowledge while remaining in line with contemporary expectations of proper feminine behaviour. Contemporaries appreciated that she was both “erudite” and good-hearted. She enjoyed dancing at balls but not card games, horse-riding, or hunting, preferring brisk-paced walks as physical exercise. Inspired by her grandmother Marie Leszczyńska, she distributed much of her income to the poor.

Despite her shy and reserved nature, Isabella was well-liked by most people. She observed others consciously and analysed their personalities, strengths, and weaknesses to build good relationships. When her best friend and possible lover, Archduchess Maria Christina, wrote a description of Isabella, she listed her negative traits as being biased in favour of those she loved and a reluctance to change her opinions. She also stated that Isabella liked to mock people, but once she had reached her goal and upset them, she was devastated.

=== Mental health problems ===
Isabella was considered melancholic, the contemporary name for depressive tendencies. Despite her usual liveliness and love of sports, she had sudden periods of being unable to move and sitting in one place, staring in front of herself for hours. It has been suggested by Tamussino that her problems may have been a form of bipolar disorder and partially hereditary, as both of her grandfathers (who were uncle and nephew) and her father showed similar symptoms. Her mother's death had a strong effect on her and convinced her that she would not live for more than four years longer. Burdened by her marriage, difficult pregnancies and homosexual desires, she became suicidal. She admitted in a letter that she would feel “great temptation” to die by suicide if it was not forbidden by the church because she felt that she was “good for nothing”, “only did bad things”, and saw no way to reach salvation. In 1763, she declared that she had heard a voice telling her that death was near, which put her in a “gentle, peaceful, festive” mood, encouraged her to “do anything” and gave her a “mysterious power over [herself]”.

== Writings ==
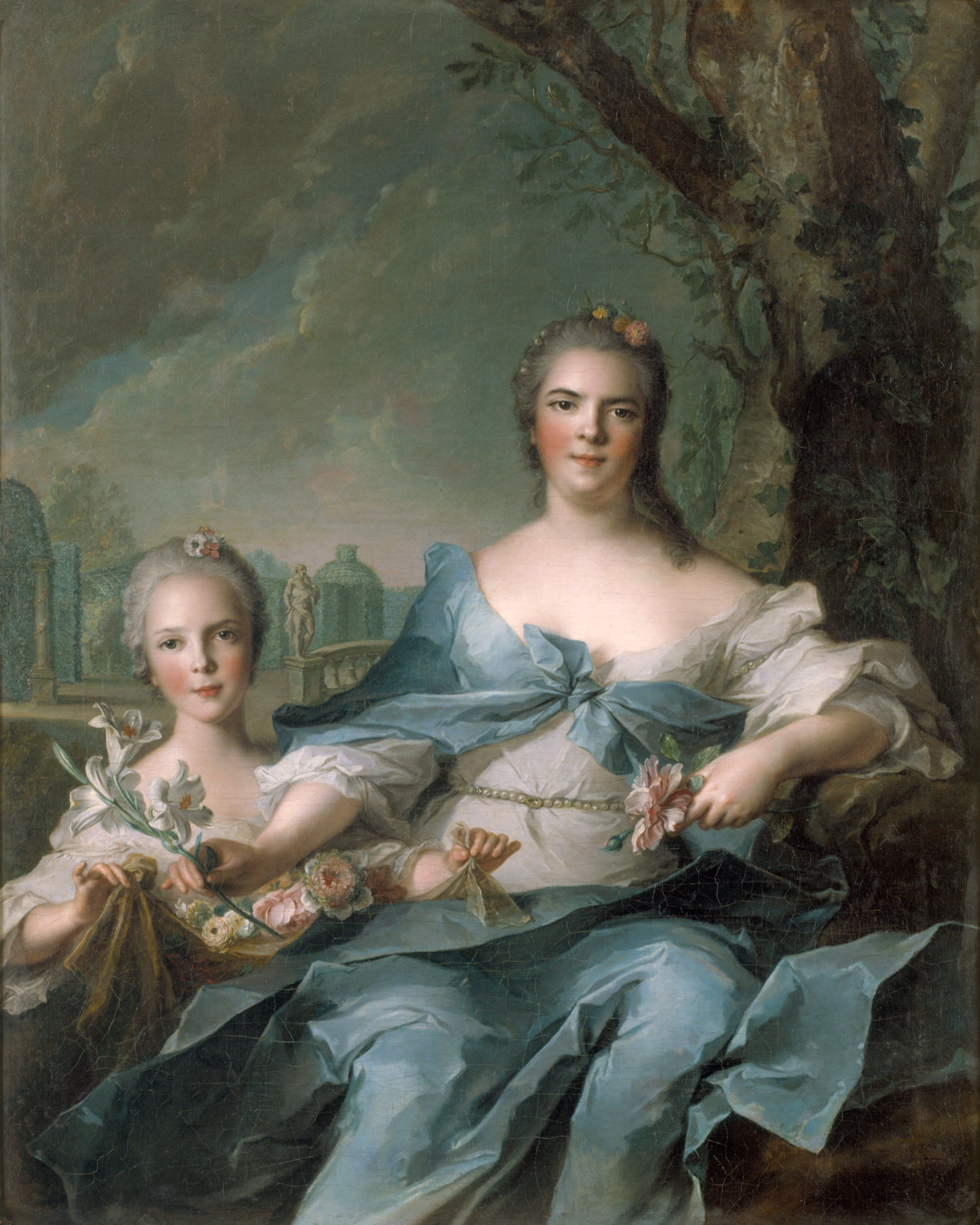
Isabella with her mother.

Isabella left numerous writings in which she analysed her life and the world around her. Her first surviving work, Remarques politiques et militaires, 'Political and Military Observations' is dated to 1758, when she was aged seventeen. She wrote an autobiography titled Les Aventures de l'étourderie, 'The Adventures of Amazement'. In her Christian Reflections, which was published on Maria Theresa's orders in 1764, she contemplated religious questions and death from a Catholic perspective. She was planning a longer study titled On the Customs of Peoples, but could only write its first part (about ancient Egyptians) before her death. In a shorter dissertation, she summarised the Viennese court's efforts to join the Habsburg monarchy into world trade.

=== Réflexions sur l'éducation ===
Reflections on Education was Isabella's rejection of the contemporary upbringing of upper-class children and a covert condemnation of her own parents and teachers, especially the abusive tutors of her brother Ferdinand. She called parents who allow strangers to raise their offspring “lazy, indifferent, and weak”.

She rejected authoritarianism and corporal punishment, as she believed these made children “violent, stubborn, and harsh” immediately and in adulthood. She argued that unexplained restrictions and harsh punishments deprived children of the experience of “fulfilling their duties willingly”, giving them the only behavioural example of violence. She believed that children had “inherent goodwill and confidence”, but those raised authoritatively would learn to act out of a “servile fear of humiliation”. In Isabella's opinion, abusing parental authority leads children to think of themselves as “slaves” and become “unfeeling and self-mocking” to cope with their low self-esteem.

She considered corporal punishment (which her parents had embraced) futile and dangerous, originating in “hardened hearts”, “lowly sentiments”, and the “false belief” that humans are “no better than animals” and cannot be persuaded through reason. For her, violence against children showed adults' lack of “understanding” and pedagogical talent. Painting an anonymous portrait of her brother, she concluded that beatings inspired “hate”, dishonesty, and a desire to “avenge themselves” in children. Instead of these methods, which she said had been gaining popularity, she advocated for kindness, “almost unknown” as it was regarded as “a weakness, a failure of firmness and reason”.

=== Sur le sort des princesses ===
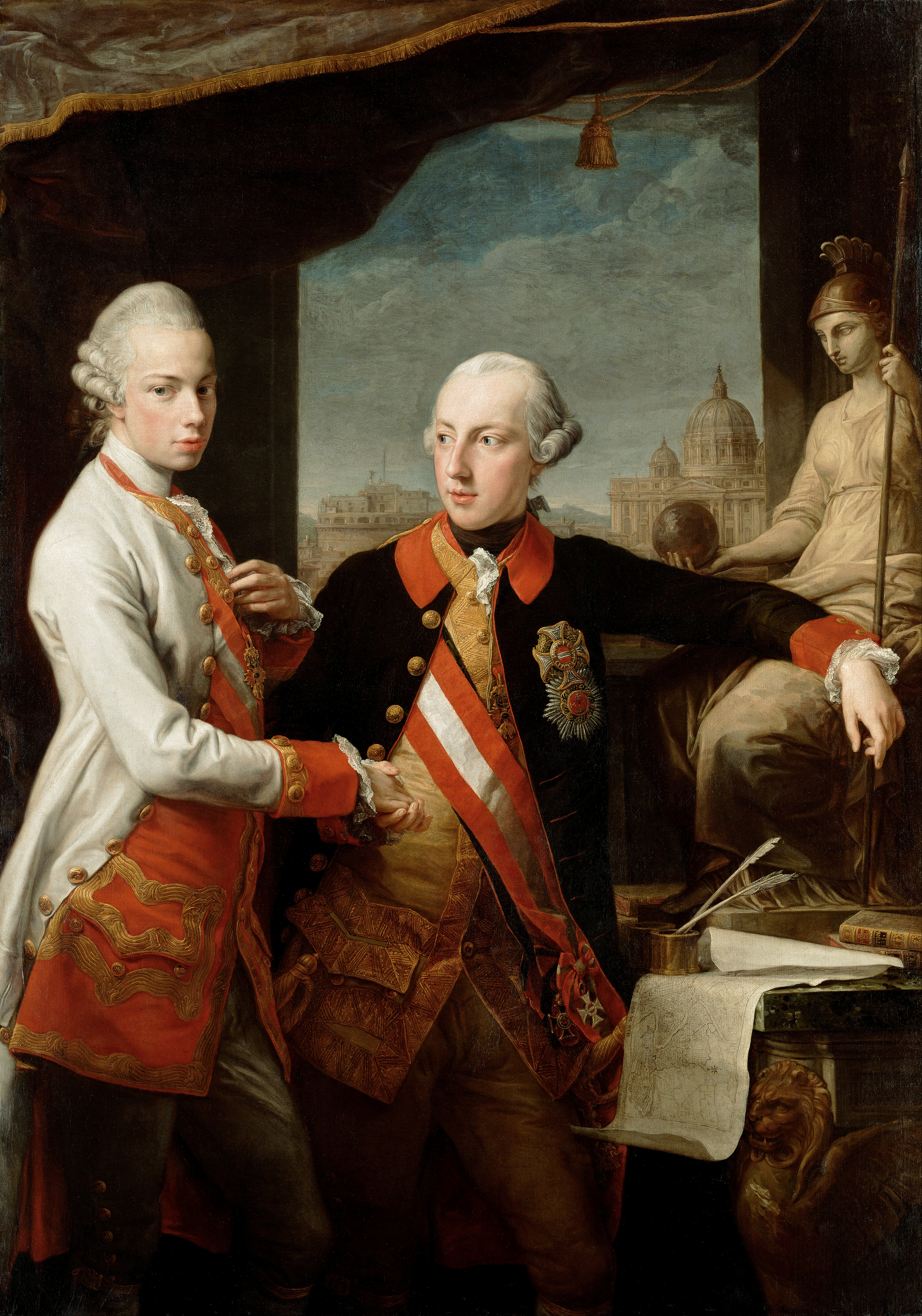
Emperor Joseph II and Grand Duke Pietro Leopoldo of Tuscany by Pompeo Batoni, 1769. Her husband Joseph (right) with his brother Leopold

In the study The Fate of Princesses, Isabella wrote that a princess was the “victim of a minister's unfortunate policies”, sacrificed for the supposed public good. She criticised the idea of allying countries through marriages, arguing that this cannot lead to a lasting alliance. She concluded that a princess was in a “sad situation” which she could nevertheless make “enviable” by invoking the will of God and serving Him.

What can the daughter of a great prince expect? [...] Already at birth she is a slave to the prejudices of the people; she is born only to be subjected to this welter of honours, to this etiquette attached to greatness. [...] Her position deprives her of knowing [those] by whom she is surrounded. [...] The rank which she bears, far from bringing her the slightest advantage, deprives her of the greatest pleasure of life. [...] [O]bligated to live in the world, she hardly has any acquaintances or friends. [...]
This is not all. In the end, they want to marry her off. She is therefore condemned to leave everything behind, her family, her homeland, and for whom? For a stranger, for a person whose character and way of thinking she does not know, for a family who will perhaps only look at her with jealousy, but in the best case with suspicion.

— Isabella of Parma, The Fate of Princesses,

=== Traité sur les hommes ===
Isabella wrote a critical piece examining the status and behaviour of men in patriarchal contemporary European society, titled Traité sur les hommes ('Treatise on Men'). She argued that women were at least as good and intellectually capable as men and mocked the male sex whom she described as “useless animals” who only exist to “do bad things, be impatient, and create confusion”. Based on her experiences and maybe her opinion of her husband, she concluded that men were “deprived of feelings, [and] only loved themselves”. In her opinion, a man is born to think but instead spends his life with “entertainment, yelling, playing heroes, running up and down, in other words, doing nothing but what flatters his vanity or requires no thought of him”. She summarised why, in her opinion, men were nevertheless above women in society: so that their “faults can make [women's] virtues shine brighter”, to become better every day, and “to be endured in the world, from which, if they did not hold all power in their hands, they would be exiled entirely”. Isabella concluded that the “slavery” of women is caused by men sensing that women are superior to them.

=== Conseils à Marie ===
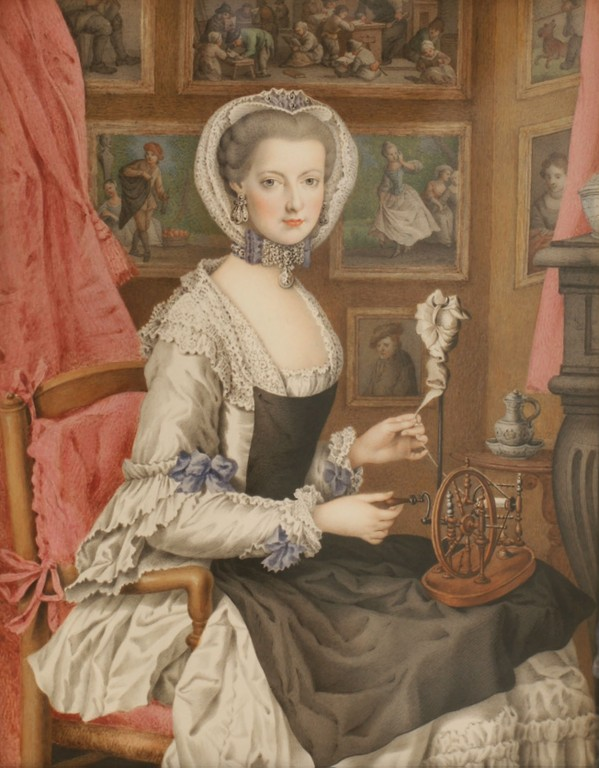
Maria Christina, Duchess of Teschen, self-portrait, ca. 1765

Isabella wrote a long letter to her sister-in-law and possible lover, Archduchess Maria Christina, as part of her preparations for death. The Conseils à Marie ('Advice to Marie') consists of descriptions of their family members and ways of nurturing a good relationship with each. In her view, her husband was “not primarily emotional” and viewed usual expressions of love such as terms of endearment or embraces as flattery or hypocrisy. She described her father-in-law Emperor Francis as an “honourable, good-hearted” man and a “reliable, true friend”, but someone who is prone to listening to bad advisors. Of Empress Maria Theresa, she wrote that “a kind of mistrust and seeming coldness” is mixed in her love for her children. She stated that her death will not be a great loss for her mother-in-law, but nevertheless cause her pain and that she will “transfer all of the friendship she feels for [Isabella] to [Marie]”.

Do you know the chaos that reigns in a certain drawer at my [apartment], where—all scattered together without any rhyme or reason—you’ll find a political essay, a heap of letters, an opéra comique, a vaudeville, a treatise on education, a harpsichord piece, moral reflections, a sermon attached to the treatise on all forms of irrationality, prayers mingled with papers dedicated to declaring my love for you, messages from the Empress lost among letters from a hundred people who mean nothing to me, these messages that are so dear to me and sweeten my life.

— Isabella of Parma, letter to Maria Christina of Austria, quotes Seth (2013)

== Bibliography ==
Isabella was a prolific writer of essays and studies during her marriage. A number of her works were found among the papers of her sister-in-law Maria Christina by her widower Albert Casimir, Duke of Teschen. They were then placed in the Habsburg family archives with his comments. He noted that other works by Isabella had been lost in a shipwreck, referring to an accident in 1792 when the belongings of the couple were transported from Rotterdam to Hamburg. Hrasky and Tamussino consider it improbable that there were further writings, “given the abundance of what has been preserved”. Together with the rest of the family papers, Isabella's work was stored in Vienna until World War I, then in a Habsburg residence in Mosonmagyaróvár, Hungary. There, a fire damaged them in 1956. As of 2026, they can be found in the National Archives of Hungary and the National Archives of Austria. Few of her writings have been published. She also composed music, and a few airs and odes by her are preserved in Budapest.

Full Bibliography of Preserved Works by Isabella of Parma
Original (French) title	English title	Publication status/details	Location of manuscript	Notes
Conseils à Marie	Advice to Marie	Published by Badinter	National Archives of Hungary	Detailed characterisation of members of the imperial family and advice on how to behave towards them; written to her sister-in-law Maria Christina.
L'Art d'écrire des lettres	The Art of Letterwriting	Unpublished	National Archives of Austria	Found among short works on diverse subjects.
Les Aventures de l'Étourderie	The Adventures of Amazement	Quoted in part and analysed by Sanger, published by Seth.	Lost to the 1956 fire of the National Archives of Hungary, known from a transcript published by Joseph Hraszky in 1959.	Autobiographical tale of l'Étourderie (“Amazement”), probably based on Isabella's own childhood.
Les Charmes de la fausse amitié	The Charms of False Friendship	Unpublished, quoted partially and analysed by Sanger.	National Archives of Hungary	Written against her sister-in-law Maria Anna.
Les Exercices de l'esprit	Spiritual Exercises	Unpublished.	National Archives of Hungary	
Le Vrai philosophe	The True Philosopher	Unpublished, quoted partially and analysed by Sanger.	National Archives of Hungary	
Méditations chrétiennes	Christian Meditations	Published in 1764 and available on Google Books; quoted in part and analysed by Sanger.	National Archives of Austria	Catholic meditations on various religious subjects, especially death.
Observations sur les Prussiens	Observations on the Prussians	Unpublished, quoted partially and analysed by Sanger.	National Archives of Hungary	
Reflections (sic!) faites dans la solitude	Reflections Made in Solitude	Unpublished, quoted partially and analysed by Sanger.	National Archives of Hungary	
Réflexions sur l'éducation	Reflections on Education	Unpublished, quoted partially and analysed by Badinter and by Sanger.	National Archives of Austria	Enlightened educational philosophy based on her adverse childhood experiences.
Remarques politiques et militaires (1758)	Political and Military Observations	Unpublished, quoted partially and analysed by Sanger.	Biblioteca Palatina, Parma	Comments on governance and war, written in Parma.
Sur la sort des princesses	On the Fate of Princesses	Published by Badinter and by Sanger.	National Archives of Hungary	Argument against dynastic marriages on a political and personal basis.
Traité historique des mœurs	A Historical Treatise on Mores	Unpublished.	National Archives of Hungary	Unfinished overview of human societies and cultural practices across history.
Traité sur la réligion	A Treatise on Religion	Unpublished.	National Archives of Austria	Only a transcript of the original exists.
Traité sur les hommes	A Treatise on Men	Unpublished, quoted partially and analysed by Badinter and by Sanger.	National Archives of Hungary	Argument against a patriarchal society and for the moral and intellectual equality of women.
Vues générales que l'on doit avoir pour bien élever un prince	General Points One Must Consider to Raise a Prince Well	Unpublished.	National Archives of Austria	Includes a German study on how to teach history to young archdukes.
Vues sur le commerce	Views on Trade	Unpublished	National Archives of Austria	Written in Parma.
Pièces sur la morale	Pieces on Morality	Unpublished	National Archives of Austria	
Questions à définir au sujet de gagner le cœur de l'Archiduc	Questions to Answer in Relation to Winning the Heart of the Archduke	Published by Badinter.	National Archives of Hungary	Guide to her sister-in-law Maria Christina on how to be on good terms with her husband Joseph.

== Issue ==
Isabella had four known pregnancies during the three years of her marriage. Two of these ended in a miscarriage and two produced daughters, only one of whom survived infancy and neither of whom lived to adulthood.

Name	Birth	Death	Notes
Archduchess Maria Theresa Elizabeth Philippine Louise Josepha Joanna	20 March 1762	23 January 1770	Died at the age of 7 of pleurisy.
Unnamed child	August 1762	August 1762	Suffered a miscarriage.
Unnamed child	January 1763	January 1763	Suffered a miscarriage.
Archduchess Maria Christina	22 November 1763	22 November 1763	Born three months premature and died shortly after birth.

== Ancestry ==
Ancestors of Princess Isabella of Parma

16. Louis XIV of France
8. Louis, Dauphin of France
17. Maria Theresa of Austria
4. Philip V of Spain
18. Ferdinand Maria, Elector of Bavaria
9. Maria Anna Victoria of Bavaria
19. Henriette Adelaide of Savoy
2. Philip, Duke of Parma
20. Ranuccio II Farnese, Duke of Parma
10. Odoardo Farnese, Hereditary Prince of Parma
21. Isabella d'Este
5. Elisabeth Farnese
22. Philip William, Elector Palatine
11. Dorothea Sophie of Neuburg
23. Elisabeth Amalie of Hesse-Darmstadt
1. Isabella of Parma
24. Louis, Dauphin of France
12. Louis, Duke of Burgundy
25. Maria Anna Victoria of Bavaria
6. Louis XV of France
26. Victor Amadeus II of Sardinia
13. Marie Adélaïde of Savoy
27. Anne Marie of Orléans
3. Louise-Élisabeth of France
28. Rafał Leszczyński
14. Stanisław I Leszczyński
29. Anna Jabłonowska
7. Marie Leszczyńska
30. Jan Karol Opaliński
15. Katarzyna Opalińska
31. Zofia Czarnkowska

== Sources ==
=== Books ===
- Anderson, Matthew Smith (23 January 1996). The War of the Austrian Succession, 1740–1748. Longman. p. 198. ISBN 978-0582059504. OCLC 30358032.
- Beutler, Gigi (1 December 1999). The Imperial Vaults of the PP Capuchins in Vienna (Capuchin Crypt). Beutler Heldenstern. ISBN 978-3950058413.
- Badinter, Élisabeth, ed. (2008). "Isabelle de Bourbon-Parme [1741–1764]". « Je meurs d'amour pour toi... ». Lettres à l'archiduchesse Marie Christine. 1760–1763 (in French). Tallandier. ISBN 9782847345087. LCCN 2008478877. OCLC 261400711. OL 23391459M.
- Falvai, Róbert (2012). "Izabella, Izabella! Aki igazán a sógornőjét szerette" [Isabella, Isabella! She Who Really Loved Her Sister-In-Law]. In Gottesmann, Péter (ed.). A Hofburg dámái [Ladies of the Hofburg] (in Hungarian). Duna International. ISBN 978-6155129568. OCLC 909849482.
- Farquhar, Michael (1 May 2001). "Unholy Matrimony". A Treasury of Royal Scandals: The Shocking True Stories of History's Wickedest, Weirdest, Most Wanton Kings, Queens, Tsars, Popes, and Emperors. Penguin Books. p. 91. ISBN 978-0140280241.
- Goldsmith, Margaret (1935). "Chapter Twelve". Maria Theresia of Austria. Archived from the original on 11 June 2022.
- Latour, Thérèse-Louis (1927). "The Daughters of Louis XV". Princesses, Ladies and Salonnières of the Reign of Louis XV. Translated by Clegg, Ivy E. Kegan Paul, Trench, Trubner & Co., Ltd. pp. 216–242.
- Leitner, Thea (1994). "Hamupipőke. Mária Anna (1738–1789)" [Cinderella. Maria Anna (1738–1789)]. A Habsburgok elfelejtett gyermekei [The Forgotten Children of the Habsburgs]. Translated by Gergely, Erzsébet. Fabula. ISBN 963-8169885.
- Sanger, Ernest (2002). Isabelle de Bourbon-Parme. La princesse et la mort [Isabella of Bourbon-Parma. The princess and death] (in French). Éditions Racine. ISBN 2-87386-276-9.
- Stollberg-Rilinger, Barbara (16 March 2017). Maria Theresia. Die Kaiserin in ihrer Zeit. Eine Biographie [Maria Theresa. The Empress in Her Time. A Biography] (in German). Beck C.H. ISBN 978-3406697487.
- Tamussino, Ursula (1989). Isabella von Parma. Gemahlin Josephs II [Isabella of Parma. Wife of Joseph II] (in German). Österreichische Bundesverlag. ISBN 978-3215070686.
- Vovk, Justin C. (20 January 2010). In Destiny's Hands. Five Tragic Rulers, Children of Maria Theresa. iUniverse. ISBN 978-1450200813.
- Weissensteiner, Friedrich (1995). "Mária Krisztina. Mária Terézia kedvence" [Maria Christina. Maria Theresa's Favourite]. Mária Terézia leányai [The Daughters of Maria Theresa] (in Hungarian). Translated by Szántó, Judit. Fabula. pp. 63–74. ISBN 963-6540292.

=== Web pages ===
- Mutschlechner, Martin. "A Wedding Album – The Marriage of Joseph II to Isabella of Parma". Die Welt der Habsburger.
- "Isabella of Parma". Die Welt der Habsburger.
- "Maria-Theresien-Gruft" [Maria Theresa Vault]. Kapuzinergruft (in German).
- Rice, 'Women in Love: Gluck's Orfeo as a Source of Romantic Consolation in Vienna, Paris, and Stockholm
- Timms, Elizabeth James (14 May 2018). "Melancholy Princess: Isabella of Parma". Royal Central.
