= Duchess Mary =

Duchess Mary is the name of:

- Mary Stewart, Duchess of Richmond (1622–1685), English duchess
- Mary Howard, Duchess of Norfolk (died 1705) (c. 1659–1705), British peeress
- Mary Howard, Duchess of Norfolk (died 1773) (c. 1712–1773), British peeress
- Mary Osborne, Duchess of Leeds (1723–1764), British duchess
- Princess Mary, Duchess of Gloucester and Edinburgh (1776–1857), member of the British Royal Family
- Mary Russell, Duchess of Bedford (1865–1937), English pilot and ornithologist
- Mary Cavendish, Duchess of Devonshire (1895–1988), Chancellor of the University of Exeter
- Mary Somerset, Duchess of Beaufort (sportswoman) (1897–1987), Commander of the Order of St John
- Mary Montagu Douglas Scott, Duchess of Buccleuch (1900–1993), British duchess
- Mary Innes-Ker, Duchess of Roxburghe (1915–2014), British duchess

== See also ==
- Duchess Maria (disambiguation)
- Duchess Marie (disambiguation)
