= Maria of Habsburg =

Maria of Habsburg may refer to:

- Mary of Austria (1505-1558), queen consort of King Louis II of Hungary and Bohemia
- Maria of Austria (1531-1581), daughter of Ferdinand I
- Archduchess Maria Theresia of Austria (1762-1770), daughter of emperor Joseph II
- Archduchess Maria Theresia of Austria (1684-1696), daughter of emperor Leopold I
- Maria Anna of Austria (1718-1744), archduchess of Austria

Other people named Maria or Mary in the house of Habsburg:

- Maria of Spain (1528–1603), wife of emperor Maximillian II
- Maria Theresa of Austria (1717–1780), Archduchess of Austria
- Maria Christina of Austria (1858–1929), queen of Spain
- Marie Antoinette (1755–1793), queen of France
