= Duchess Maria =

Duchess Maria may refer to:

- Duchess Maria Christina of Teschen (1742–1798), Archduchess of Austria
- Duchess Maria Dorothea of Württemberg (1797–1855), daughter of Duke Louis of Württemberg and Princess Henriette of Nassau-Weilburg
- Duchess Maria Josepha of Bavaria (1857–1943), Infanta of Portugal
- Duchess Maria Nikolaievna of Leuchtenberg (1819–1876), President of the Imperial Academy of Arts
- Duchess Maria of Gloucester and Edinburgh (1736–1807), member of the British Royal Family
- Duchess Maria Sophie of Bavaria (1841–1925), last Queen consort of the Kingdom of the Two Sicilies

== See also ==
- Archduchess Maria (disambiguation)
- Duchess Marie (disambiguation)
- Duchess Mary (disambiguation)
- Grand Duchess Maria (disambiguation)
