= Duchess Marie =

Duchess Marie may refer to:

- Marie Angélique de Scorailles (1661–1681), Duchess of Fontages
- Marie, Duchess of Anhalt
- Duchess Marie d'Orleans-Longueville de Nemours (1625–1707), daughter of Henry II of Orleans, duke of Longueville
- Duchess Marie Louise of Parma (1791–1847), Archduchess of Austria
- Duchess Marie of Auvergne (1367–1434), daughter of John, Duke of Berry
- Duchess Marie of Mecklenburg (1878–1918), eldest daughter of Adolf Friedrich V, Grand Duke of Mecklenburg-Strelitz and Princess Elisabeth of Anhalt
- Duchess Marie of Mecklenburg-Schwerin (1854–1920), daughter of Frederick Francis II, Grand Duke of Mecklenburg-Schwerin and Princess Auguste Mathilde Wilhelmine of Reuss
- Duchess Marie Elisabeth of Saxony
- Duchess Marie Gabrielle in Bavaria
- Duchess and Marie, two characters from the 1970 Disney film, The Aristocats

== See also ==
- Marie Anne de Bourbon
- Archduchess Marie (disambiguation)
- Duchess Maria (disambiguation)
- Duchess Mary (disambiguation)
