= Grand Duchess Maria =

Grand Duchess Maria may refer to:

- Grand Duchess Maria Alexandrovna of Russia (1853-1920), Companion of the Order of the Crown of India
- Grand Duchess Maria Nikolaevna of Russia (1899-1918), Eastern Orthodox saint
- Grand Duchess Maria Nikolaievna, Duchess of Leuchtenberg (1819-1876), President of the Imperial Academy of Arts
- Grand Duchess Maria Pavlovna of Russia (1786-1859), third daughter of Paul I of Russia and Sophie Dorothea of Württemberg
- Grand Duchess Maria Pavlovna of Russia (1854-1920), Russian expatriate
- Grand Duchess Maria Pavlovna of Russia (1890-1958), Russian nurse
- Maria Teresa, Grand Duchess of Luxembourg (born 1956), grand ducal consort of Grand Duke Henri of Luxembourg
- Maria Vladimirovna, Grand Duchess of Russia (born 1953), disputed pretender to the Russian throne

== See also ==
- Archduchess Maria (disambiguation)
- Duchess Maria (disambiguation)
