= Archduchess Maria =

Archduchess Maria may refer to a number of historical noblewomen of Austria:

- Maria Christina, Duchess of Teschen (1742–1798), Archduchess of Austria

== Archduchess Maria of Austria-Este ==
- Archduchess Laetitia Maria of Austria-Este (born 2003)
- Archduchess Luisa Maria of Austria-Este (born 1995)
- Princess Maria Laura of Belgium, Archduchess of Austria-Este (born 1988)

== Archduchess Maria of Austria ==
- Maria of Austria, Duchess of Jülich-Cleves-Berg (1531–1581), daughter of Holy Roman Emperor Ferdinand I and Anna of Bohemia and Hungary
- Archduchess Maria of Austria (1584–1649), daughter of Ferdinand II, Archduke of Austria and Anne Juliana Gonzaga
- Archduchess Maria Anna of Austria (1610–1665), Electress of Bavaria
- Archduchess Maria Anna of Austria (governor) (1718–1744), Duchess of Lorraine
- Archduchess Maria Anna of Austria (1738–1789), second and eldest surviving daughter of Francis I, Holy Roman Emperor and Maria Theresa of Austria
- Archduchess Maria-Anna of Austria, Princess Galitzine (b. 1954), daughter of Archduke Rudolf of Austria and Countess Xenia Czernichev-Besobrasov
- Archduchess Maria Johanna Gabriela of Austria (1750–1762), daughter of Francis I, Holy Roman Emperor and Maria Theresa of Austria, Holy Roman Empress
- Archduchess Maria Josepha of Austria (1751–1767), daughter of Francis I, Holy Roman Emperor and Maria Theresa of Austria, Holy Roman Empress
- Archduchess Maria Maddalena of Austria (1589–1631), better known as Maria Maddalena which was Italian for Magdalena
- Archduchess Maria Theresa of Austria (1684–1696), daughter of Leopold I, Holy Roman Emperor and Eleonore-Magdalena of Pfalz-Neuburg
- Archduchess Maria Magdalena of Austria (1689–1743), daughter of Emperor Leopold I and Eleonore-Magdalena of Pfalz-Neuburg
- Archduchess Maria Theresa of Austria (1762–1770), daughter of Joseph II, Holy Roman Emperor and Isabella Maria of Parma
- Maria Theresa of Austria, Queen of Saxony (1767–1827)
- Maria Leopoldina of Austria (1797–1826), Archduchess of Austria, Empress of Brazil and Queen of Portugal
- Archduchess Marie Anne of Austria (1804–1858), daughter of Francis II, Holy Roman Emperor and Maria Theresa of the Two Sicilies

== See also ==
- Duchess Maria (disambiguation)
- Grand Duchess Maria (disambiguation)
- Archduchess Maria Anna of Austria (disambiguation)
- Archduchess Marie of Austria (disambiguation)
