= Archduchess Maria Theresa of Austria (1762–1770) =

Member of the House of Habsburg (1762–1770)

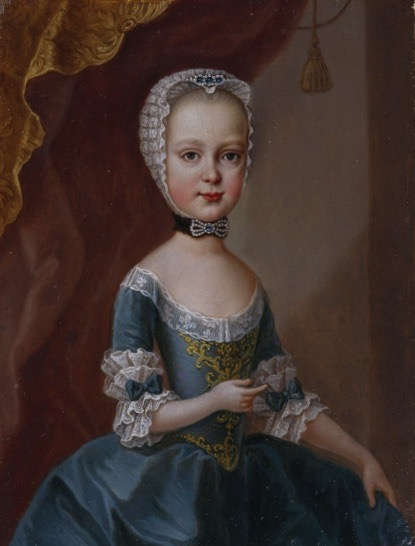
- Portrait c. 1765–70
- Born: 20 March 1762; Schönbrunn Palace, Vienna, Archduchy of Austria, Holy Roman Empire
- Died: 23 January 1770 (aged 7); Schönbrunn Palace, Vienna, Archduchy of Austria, Holy Roman Empire
Names
- Maria Theresia Elisabeth Philippine Luise Josepha Johanna
- House: Habsburg-Lorraine
- Father: Joseph II, Holy Roman Emperor
- Mother: Isabella of Parma

Archduchess Maria Theresa of Austria (German: Maria Theresia Elisabeth Philippine Luise Josepha Johanna; English: Mary Theresa Elizabeth Philippine Louisa Josepha Joan; 20 March 1762 – 23 January 1770) was a daughter of Joseph II, Holy Roman Emperor, and his first wife, Isabella of Parma. By birth, she was a member of the ruling House of Habsburg.

== Biography ==
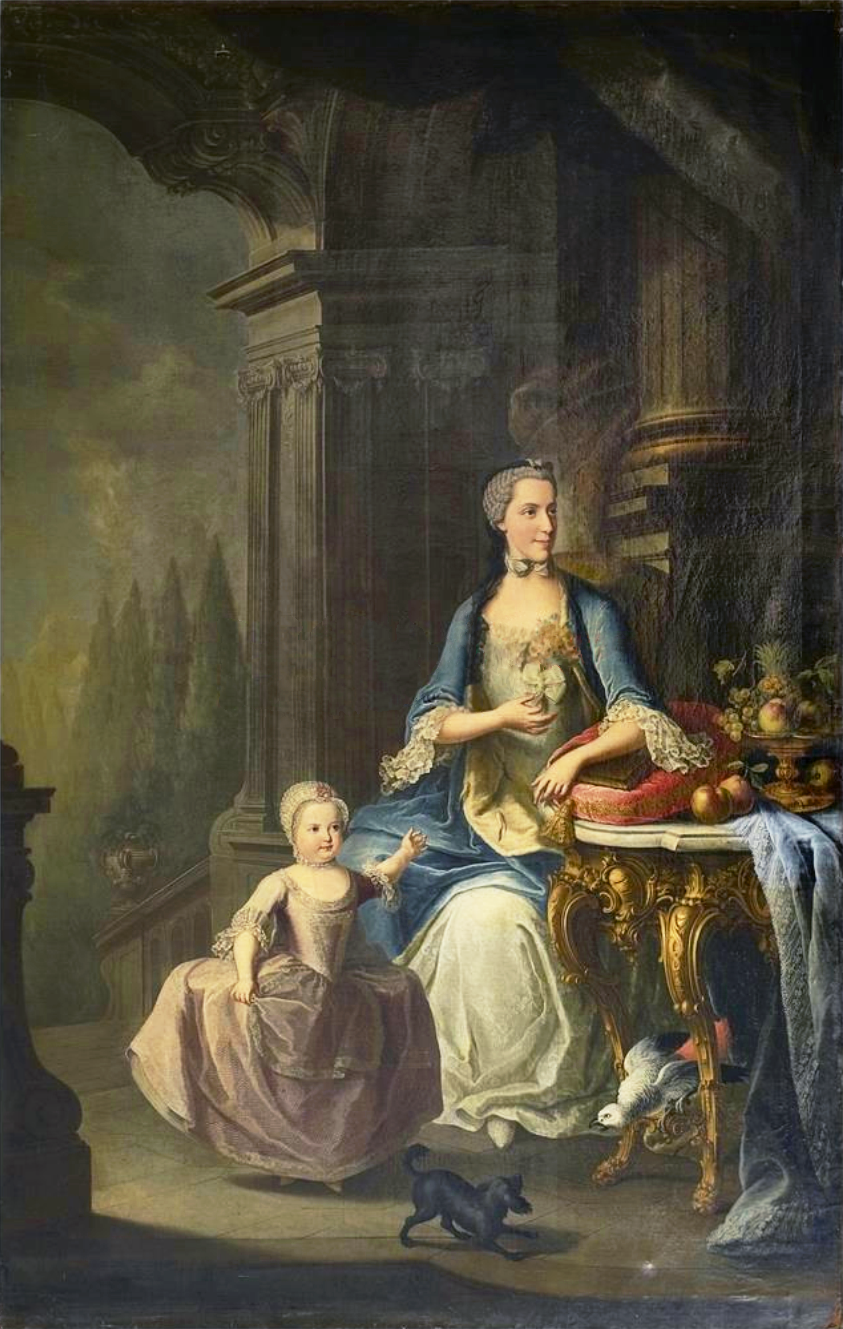
Archduchess Maria Theresa with her mother, Isabella of Parma, c. 1763-64.

Maria Theresa's parents, Archduke Joseph of Austria and Princess Isabella of Parma, were married in Vienna on 16 October 1760. In late 1761, Isabella became pregnant and on 20 March 1762, she delivered a daughter who was christened Maria Theresia Elisabeth Philippine Louise Josephe Johanna and styled as an archduchess of Austria. On her maternal side, Maria Theresa has descended from the first Bourbon king of Spain, Philip V. She was also a great-great-granddaughter of the twice deposed King of Poland and last Duke of Lorraine and Bar, Stanisław I, who was still alive the time of her birth. On her paternal side, she was a granddaughter of Holy Roman Empress Maria Theresa and her husband, Holy Roman Emperor Francis I, who preceded Stanisław at the throne of Lorraine.

When she was a little over a year old, her mother died a week after giving birth to her only sibling, Archduchess Marie Christine, who died a few moments after being born. Her father was inconsolable and found refuge in his infant daughter, whom he referred to as his "second self". Maria Theresa was also close to her youngest paternal aunt, Archduchess Maria Antonia, just seven years her senior. She was also Empress Maria Theresa's first grandchild.

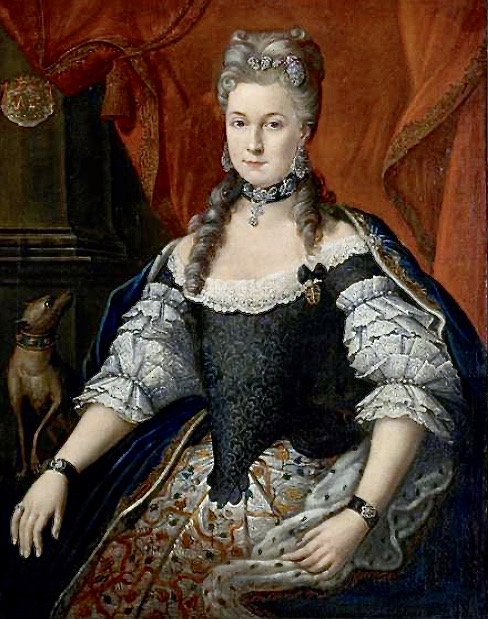
Maria Theresa's governess: Christine-Philippine-Élisabeth, Marquise de Herzelles (1728–1793)

Just a few months short of her eighth birthday, Archduchess Maria Theresa became ill with pleurisy. Her father, by that time Holy Roman Emperor, did everything in his power to save her and attended her bedside even at night. Archduchess Maria Theresa died on 23 January 1770 from a very high fever. Her father was heartbroken. When Imperial Majordomo, Prince Johann Joseph von Khevenhüller-Metsch had to disturb Joseph in order to make the arrangements for the funeral, the emperor, with tears in his eyes, told him 'he had lost, so to speak, his only consolation and pleasure'.

Below are excerpts from a letter from Joseph to his daughter's Belgian born governess, Countess Christine-Philippine-Élisabeth de Trazegnies, Marquise de Herzelles, written by him just a few hours after Maria Theresa's death;

If decency permitted, it would be with you alone that I would be pouring out the sorrow which... pierces my soul. I have ceased to be a father: it is more than I can bear. Despite being resigned to it, I cannot stop myself thinking and saying every moment: 'O my God, restore to me my daughter, restore her to me.' I hear her voice, I see her. I was dazed when the terrible blow fell. Only after I had got back to my room did I feel the full horror of it, and I shall go on feeling it all the rest of my life since I shall miss her in everything...
As my daughter's sole heir, I have just given orders... that I should keep only her diamonds. [You are to have everything else.] One thing that I would ask you to let me have is her white dimity dressing-gown, embroidered with flowers, and some of her writings...

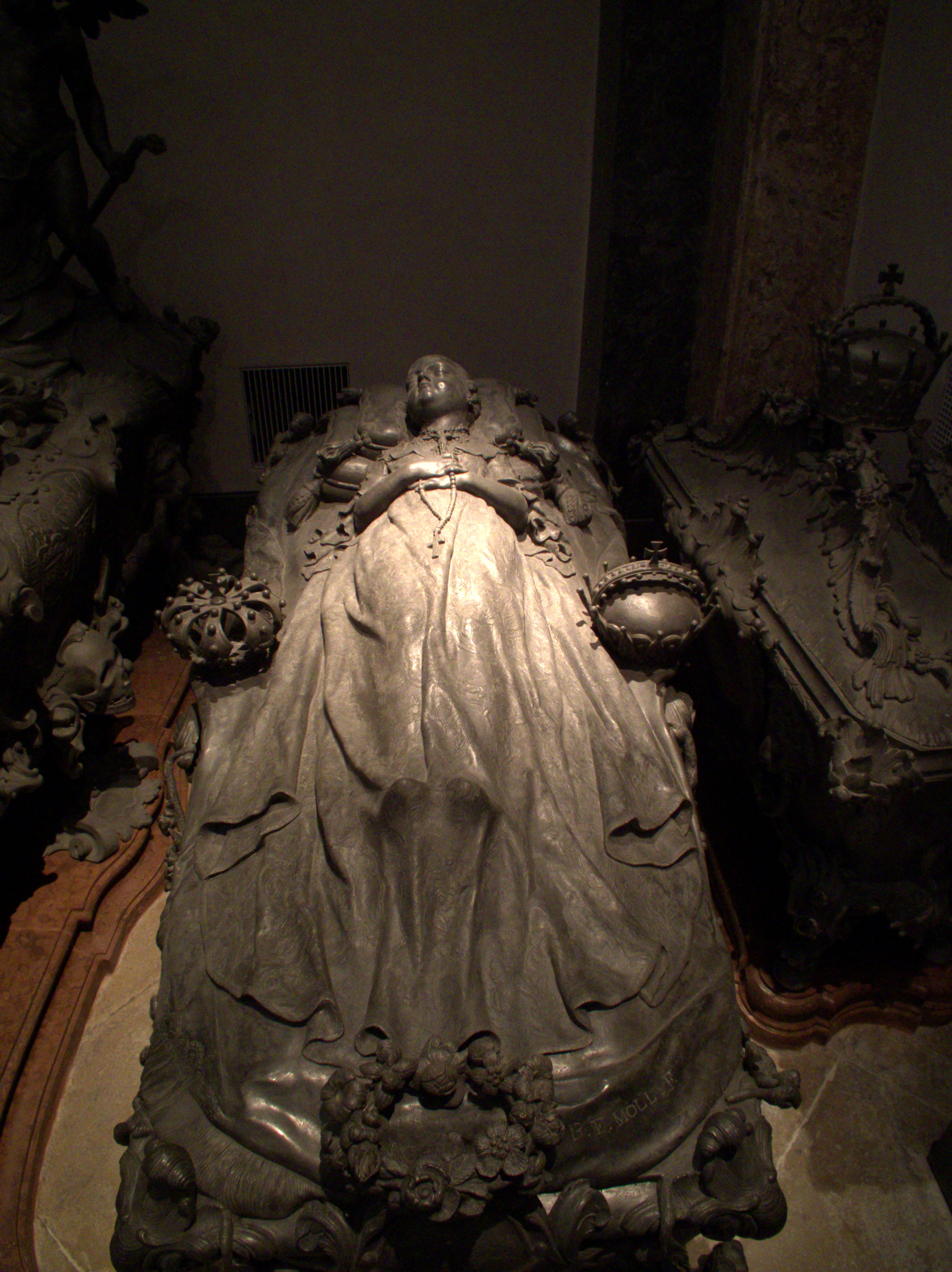
Tomb effigy of Archduchess Maria Theresa

The death of his only and much-idolized daughter confirmed Joseph in his growing misanthropy, and finished the job of making him a compulsive worker.

The young Archduchess was the second of Maria Theresa's grandchildren to die, after her younger sister. It is said that, even after her death, her father kept her dresses and shoes. She was buried in the Imperial Crypt in Vienna, where many other members of the Habsburg family rest. Her tomb consists of an effigy that represents the young Archduchess sleeping on a bed, covered by a blanket, with her hands towards the sky in sign of prayer and surrounded by the Holy Crown of Hungary and the crown of the Holy Roman Emperor.

== Ancestors ==
Ancestors of Archduchess Maria Theresa of Austria (1762–1770)

8. Leopold, Duke of Lorraine
4. Francis I, Holy Roman Emperor
9. Élisabeth Charlotte of Orléans
2. Joseph II, Holy Roman Emperor
10. Charles VI, Holy Roman Emperor
5. Maria Theresa of Austria
11. Elisabeth Christine of Brunswick
1. Archduchess Maria Theresa of Austria
12. Philip V of Spain
6. Philip, Duke of Parma
13. Elisabeth Farnese
3. Isabella of Parma
14. Louis XV of France
7. Louise-Élisabeth of France
15. Marie Leszczyńska
