= Maria Theresa =

Habsburg monarch from 1740 to 1780

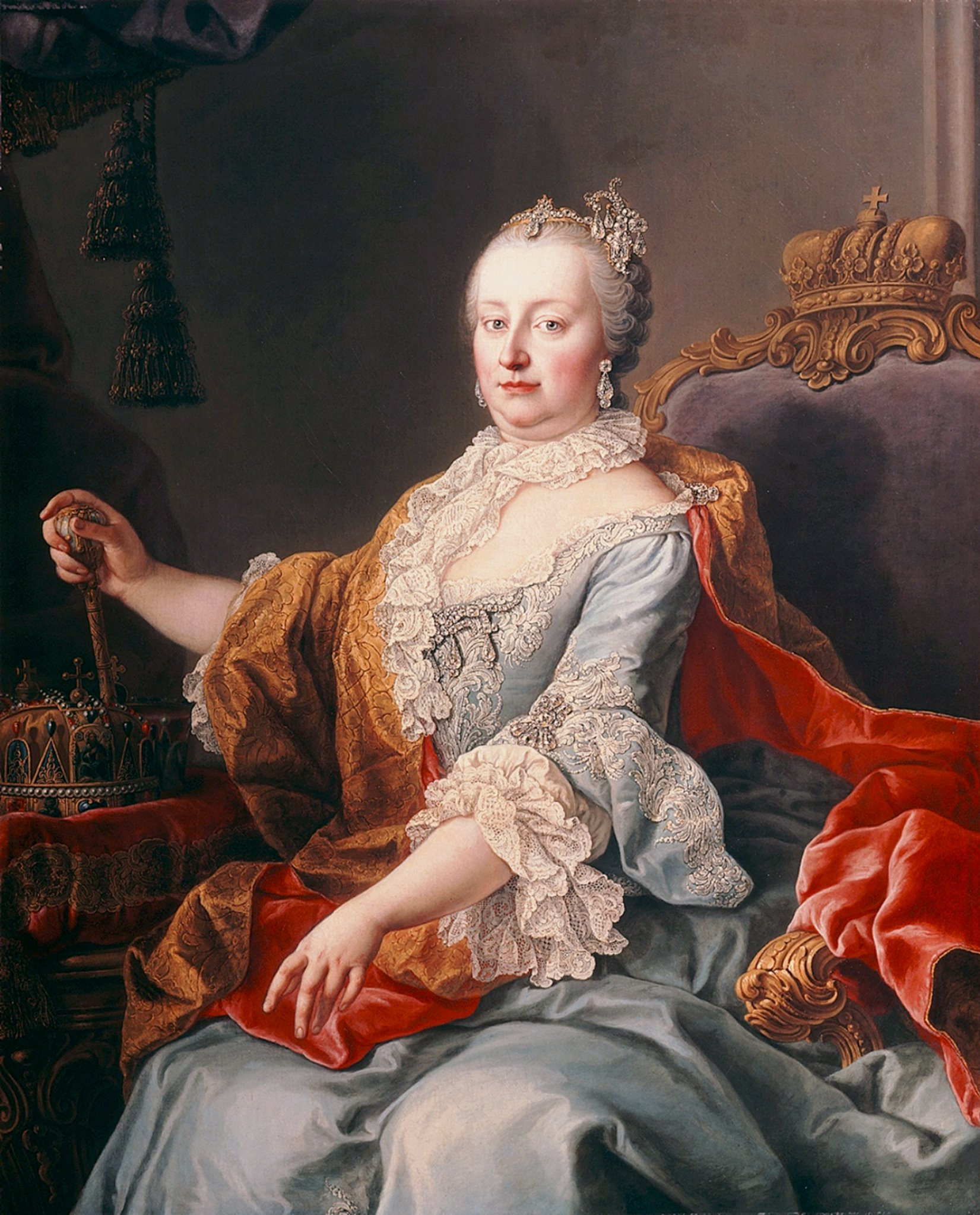
- Portrait by Martin van Meytens, 1759

Holy Roman Empress
- Tenure: 13 September 1745 – 18 August 1765

Queen of Bohemia
- Reign: 12 May 1743 – 29 November 1780
- Coronation: 12 May 1743
- Predecessor: Charles Albert
- Successor: Joseph II
- Reign: 20 October 1740 – 19 December 1741
- Predecessor: Charles II
- Successor: Charles Albert

Archduchess of Austria; Queen of Hungary
- Reign: 20 October 1740 – 29 November 1780
- Coronation: 25 June 1741
- Predecessor: Charles III
- Successor: Joseph II
- Born: 13 May 1717; Vienna, Austria
- Died: 29 November 1780 (aged 63); Vienna, Austria
- Burial: Imperial Crypt
- Spouse: Francis I, Holy Roman Emperor (m. 1736; died 1765)
- Issue Detail: Archduchess Maria Elisabeth; Archduchess Maria Anna; Archduchess Maria Carolina; Joseph II, Holy Roman Emperor; Maria Christina, Duchess of Teschen; Archduchess Maria Elisabeth; Archduke Charles Joseph; Maria Amalia, Duchess of Parma; Leopold II, Holy Roman Emperor; Archduchess Maria Carolina; Archduchess Johanna Gabriele; Archduchess Maria Josepha; Maria Carolina, Queen of Naples and Sicily; Ferdinand Karl, Archduke of Austria-Este; Marie Antoinette, Queen of France; Maximilian Francis, Archbishop-Elector of Cologne; Leopoldina Maria Johanna, Grand Duchess of Russia
Names
- Maria Theresia Walburga Amalia Christina
- House: Habsburg
- Father: Charles VI, Holy Roman Emperor
- Mother: Elisabeth Christine of Brunswick-Wolfenbüttel

Maria Theresa (Maria Theresia Walburga Amalia Christina; 13 May 1717 – 29 November 1780) ruled the Habsburg monarchy from 1740 until her death in 1780, and the only woman to hold the position in her own right. She was the sovereign of Austria, Hungary, Croatia, Bohemia, Transylvania, Slavonia, Mantua, Milan, Moravia, Galicia and Lodomeria, Dalmatia, (Note: Maria Theresa was also the titular Queen of Dalmatia, but during her reign, it was actually under Venetian rule.) Austrian Netherlands, Carinthia, Carniola, Gorizia and Gradisca, Austrian Silesia, Tyrol, Styria, and Parma. By marriage, she was Duchess of Lorraine, Grand Duchess of Tuscany, and Holy Roman Empress.

Maria Theresa started her 40-year reign when her father, Charles VI, Holy Roman Emperor, died on 20 October 1740. Charles VI paved the way for her accession with the Pragmatic Sanction of 1713 and spent his entire reign securing it through international diplomacy. He neglected the advice of Prince Eugene of Savoy, who believed that a strong military and a rich treasury were more important than mere signatures. Eventually, Charles VI left behind a weakened and impoverished state, particularly due to the War of the Polish Succession and the Russo-Turkish War (1735–1739). Moreover, upon his death, Saxony, Prussia, Bavaria, and France all repudiated the sanction they had recognised during his lifetime. Frederick the Great of Prussia (who became Maria Theresa's greatest rival for most of her reign) promptly invaded and took the affluent Habsburg province of Silesia in the eight-year conflict known as the War of the Austrian Succession. In defiance of the grave situation, she managed to secure the vital support of the Hungarians for the war effort. During the war, Maria Theresa successfully defended her rule over most of the Habsburg monarchy, apart from the loss of Silesia and a few minor territories in Italy. Maria Theresa later unsuccessfully tried to recover Silesia during the Seven Years' War.

Although she was expected to cede power to her husband, Emperor Francis I, and her eldest son, Emperor Joseph II, who were officially her co-rulers in Austria and Bohemia, Maria Theresa ruled as an autocratic sovereign with the counsel of her advisers. She promulgated institutional, financial, medical, and educational reforms, with the assistance of Wenzel Anton of Kaunitz-Rietberg, Friedrich Wilhelm von Haugwitz, and Gerard van Swieten. She also promoted commerce and the development of agriculture, and reorganised Austria's ramshackle military, all of which strengthened Austria's international standing. A pious Catholic, she despised Freemasons, Jews and Protestants, and on certain occasions she ordered their expulsion to remote parts of the realm. She also advocated for the Catholic Church.

Despite bearing 16 children surviving infancy, she remained active throughout her rule, although her rule is often split into two parts (before and post loss of Silesia) to distinguish two radically different depths of competency and reforms.

== Birth and early life ==
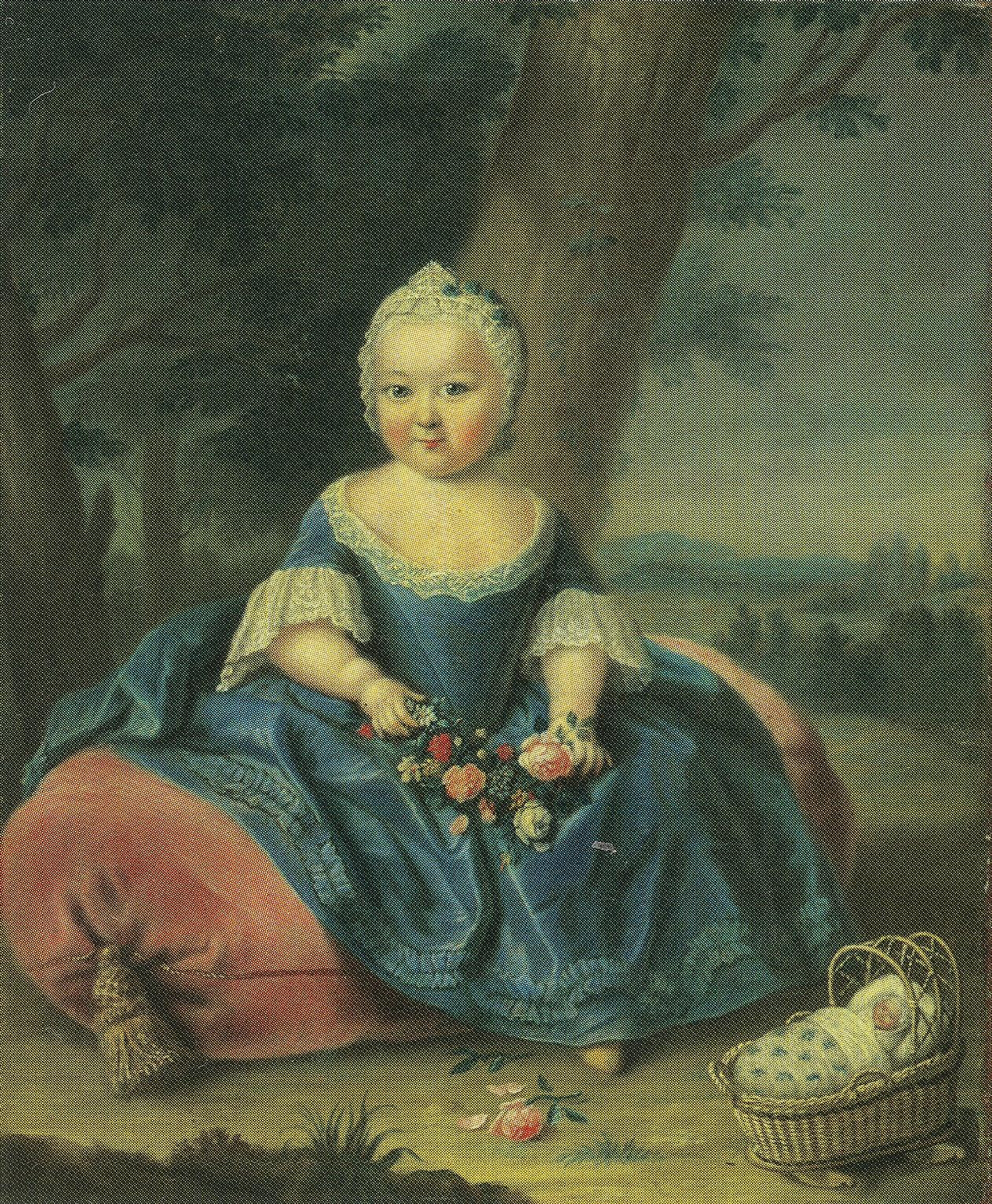
Painting of three-year-old Maria Theresa in the gardens of Hofburg Palace

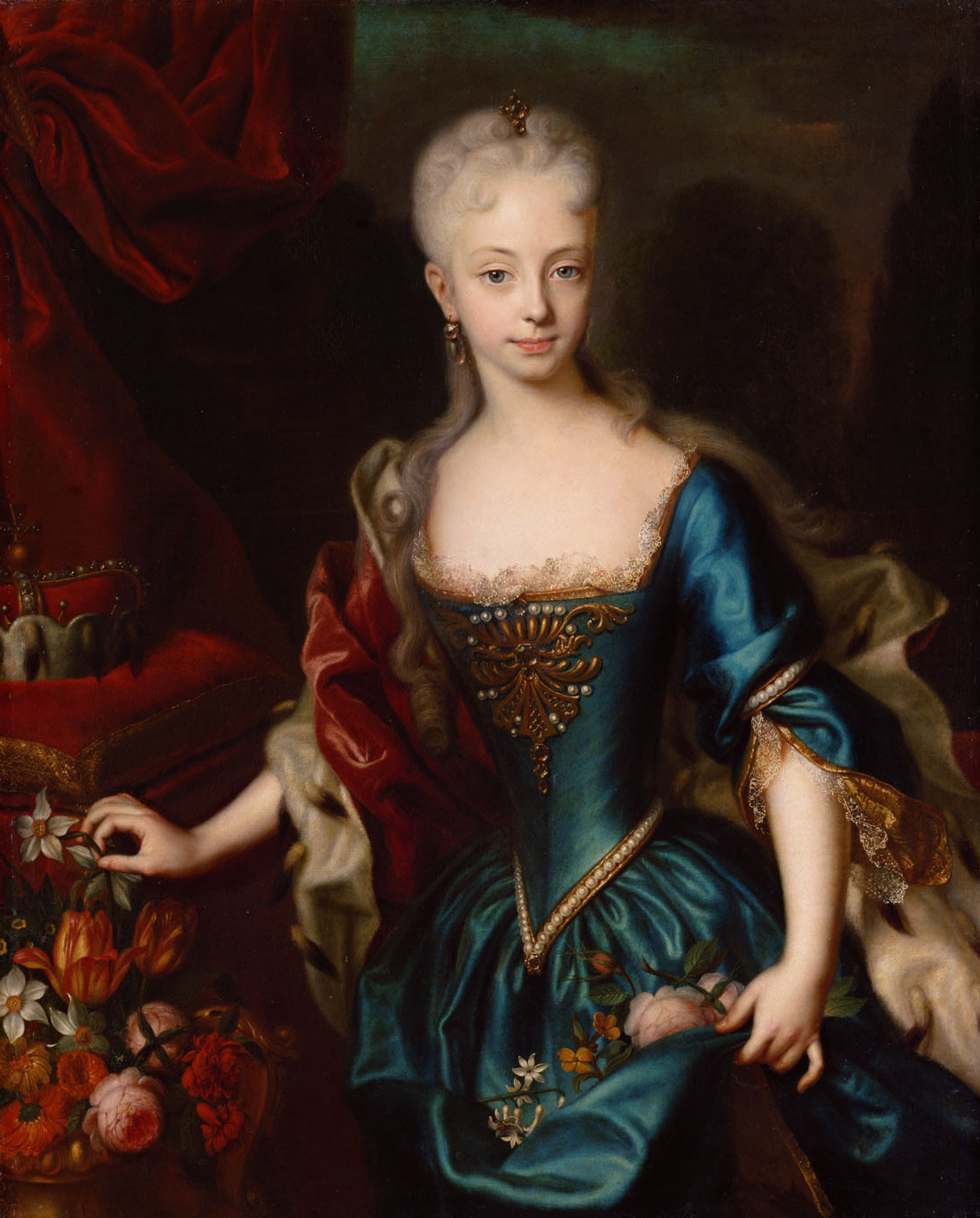
Archduchess Maria Theresa, by Andreas Møller

The second and eldest surviving child of Holy Roman Emperor Charles VI and Elisabeth Christine of Brunswick-Wolfenbüttel, Archduchess Maria Theresa was born on 13 May 1717 in Vienna, six months after the death of her elder brother, Archduke Leopold Johann, and was baptised on that same evening. The dowager empresses, her aunt Wilhelmine Amalia of Brunswick-Lüneburg and grandmother Eleonore Magdalene of Neuburg, were her godmothers. Most descriptions of her baptism stress that the infant was carried ahead of her cousins, Maria Josepha and Maria Amalia, the daughters of Charles VI's elder brother and predecessor, Joseph I, before the eyes of their mother, Wilhelmine Amalia. It was clear that Maria Theresa would outrank them, even though their grandfather, Holy Roman Emperor Leopold I, had had his sons sign the Mutual Pact of Succession, which gave precedence to the daughters of the elder brother. Her father was the only surviving male member of the House of Habsburg and hoped for a son who would prevent the extinction of his dynasty and succeed him. Thus, the birth of Maria Theresa was a great disappointment to him and the people of Vienna; Charles never managed to overcome this feeling.

Maria Theresa replaced Maria Josepha as heir presumptive to the Habsburg realms the moment she was born; Charles VI had issued the Pragmatic Sanction of 1713 which had placed his nieces behind his own daughters in the line of succession. Charles sought the other European powers' approval for disinheriting his nieces. They exacted harsh terms: in the Treaty of Vienna (1731), Great Britain demanded that Austria abolish the Ostend Company in return for its recognition of the Pragmatic Sanction. In total, Great Britain, France, Saxony, United Provinces, Spain, Prussia, Russia, Denmark, Sardinia, Bavaria, and the Diet of the Holy Roman Empire recognised the sanction. France, Spain, Saxony, Bavaria, and Prussia later reneged.

Little more than a year after her birth, Maria Theresa was joined by a sister, Maria Anna, and another one, named Maria Amalia, was born in 1724. The portraits of the imperial family show that Maria Theresa resembled Elisabeth Christine and Maria Anna. The Prussian ambassador noted that she had large blue eyes, fair hair with a slight tinge of red, a wide mouth and a notably strong body. Unlike many other members of the House of Habsburg, neither Maria Theresa's parents nor her grandparents were closely related to each other. (Note: Members of the Habsburg dynasty often married their close relatives; examples of such inbreeding were uncle-niece pairs (Maria Theresa's grandfather Leopold and Margaret Theresa of Spain, Philip II of Spain and Anna of Austria, Philip IV of Spain and Mariana of Austria, etc). Maria Theresa, however, descended from Leopold I's third wife who was not closely related to him, and her parents were only distantly related.Beales 1987, pp. 20–21.)

Maria Theresa was a serious and reserved child who enjoyed singing and archery. She was barred from horse riding by her father, but she would later learn the basics for the sake of her Hungarian coronation ceremony. The imperial family staged opera productions, often conducted by Charles VI, in which she relished participating. Her education was overseen by Jesuits. Contemporaries thought her Latin to be quite good, but in all else, the Jesuits did not educate her well. Her spelling and punctuation were unconventional, and she lacked the formal manner and speech which had characterised her Habsburg predecessors. (Note: Rather than using the formal manner and speech, Maria Theresa spoke (and sometimes wrote) Viennese German, which she picked up from her servants and ladies-in-waiting.Spielman 1993, p. 206.) Maria Theresa developed a close relationship with Countess Marie Karoline von Fuchs-Mollard, who taught her etiquette. She was educated in drawing, painting, music, and dancing – the disciplines that would have prepared her for the role of queen consort. Her father allowed her to attend meetings of the council from the age of 14 but never discussed the affairs of state with her. Even though he had spent the last decades of his life securing Maria Theresa's inheritance, Charles never prepared his daughter for her future role as sovereign.

== Marriage ==
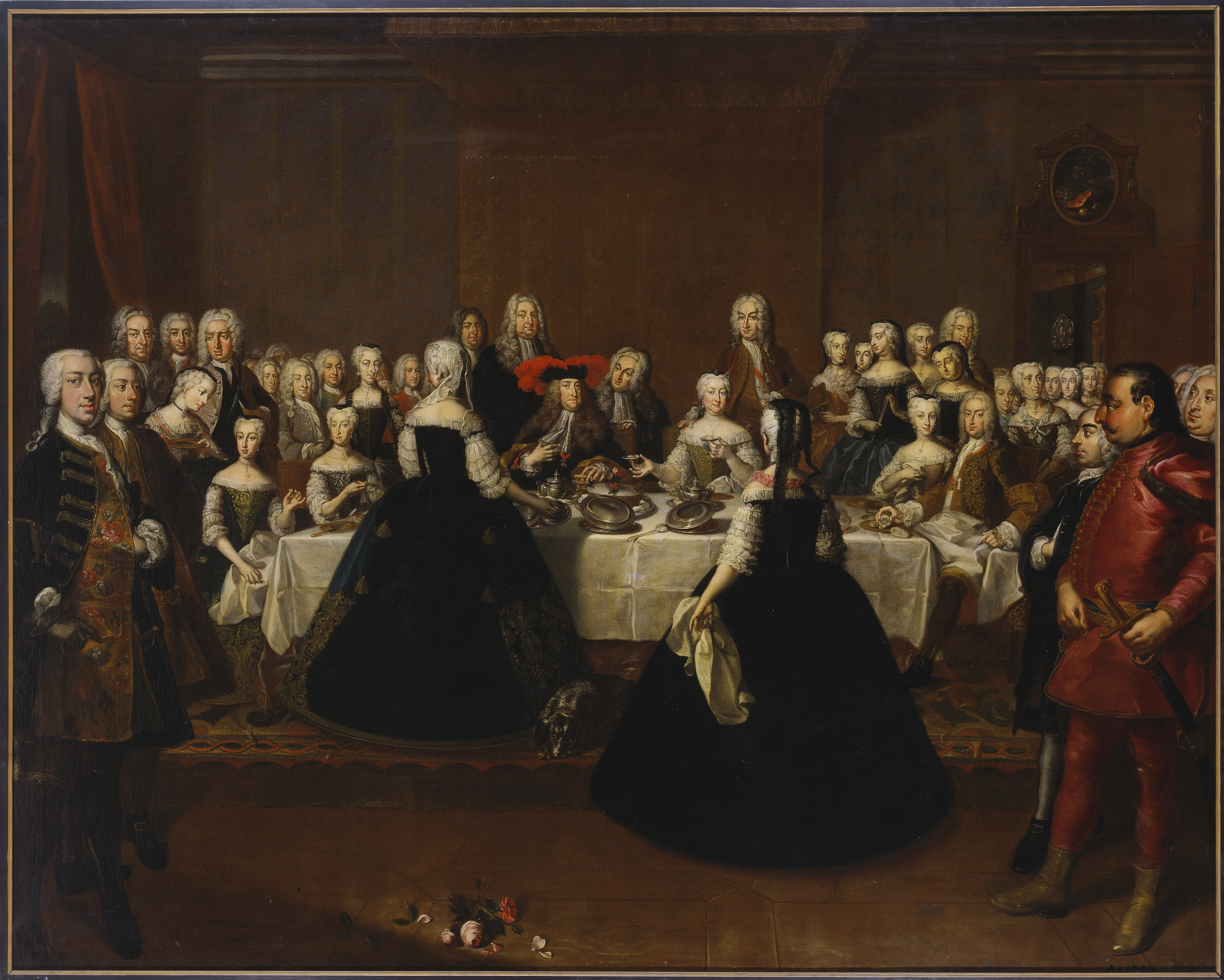
Maria Theresa and Francis Stephen at their wedding breakfast, by Martin van Meytens. Charles VI (in the red-plumed hat) is seated at the centre of the table.

The question of Maria Theresa's marriage was raised early in her childhood. Leopold Clement of Lorraine was first considered to be the appropriate suitor, and he was supposed to visit Vienna and meet the Archduchess in 1723. These plans were forestalled by his death from smallpox that year. Leopold Clement's younger brother, Francis Stephen, was invited to Vienna. Even though Francis Stephen was his favourite candidate for Maria Theresa's hand, the Emperor considered other possibilities. Religious differences prevented him from arranging his daughter's marriage to the Protestant prince Frederick of Prussia. In 1725, he betrothed her to Charles of Spain and her sister, Maria Anna, to Philip of Spain. However, other European powers compelled him to renounce the pact he had made with the Queen of Spain, Elisabeth Farnese, and the betrothal to Charles was broken off. Maria Theresa, who had become close to Francis Stephen, was relieved.

Francis Stephen remained at the imperial court until 1729, when he ascended the throne of Lorraine, but was not formally promised Maria Theresa's hand until 31 January 1736, during the War of the Polish Succession. Louis XV of France demanded that Maria Theresa's fiancé surrender his ancestral Duchy of Lorraine to accommodate his father-in-law, Stanisław I, who had been deposed as king of Poland. (Note: Maria Theresa's father compelled Francis Stephen to renounce his rights to Lorraine and told him: "No renunciation, no archduchess."Beales 1987, p. 23.) Francis Stephen was to receive the Grand Duchy of Tuscany upon the death of childless Grand Duke Gian Gastone de' Medici. The couple were married on 12 February 1736 at the Augustinian Church in Vienna. The Duchess of Lorraine's love for her husband was strong and possessive. The letters she sent to him shortly before their marriage expressed her eagerness to see him; his letters, on the other hand, were stereotyped and formal. She was very jealous of her husband and his infidelity was the greatest problem of their marriage, with Maria Wilhelmina, Princess of Auersperg, as his best-known mistress.

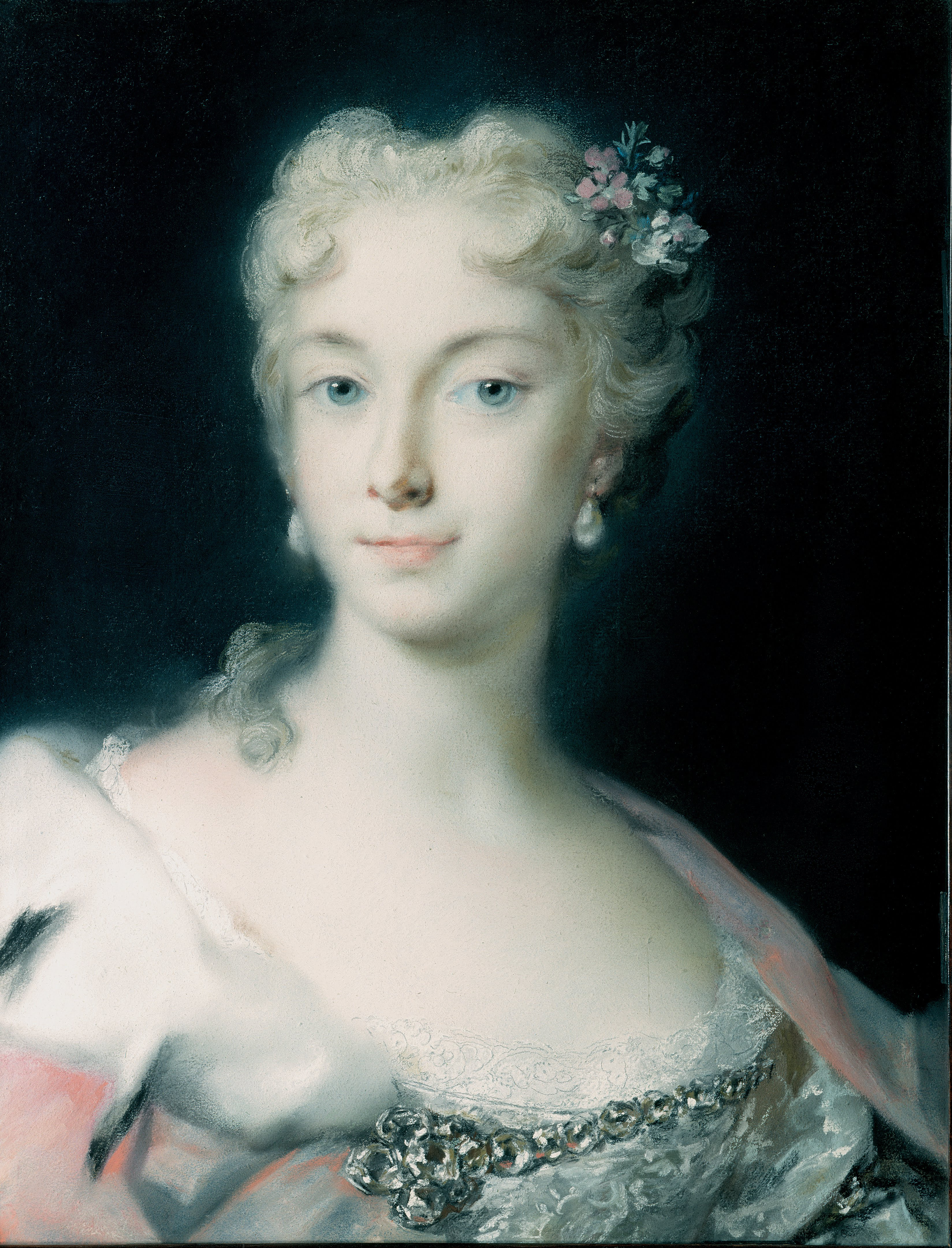
Maria Theresa in 1730, by Venetian painter Rosalba Carriera

Upon Gian Gastone's death on 9 July 1737, Francis Stephen ceded Lorraine and became grand duke of Tuscany. In 1738, Charles VI sent the young couple to make their formal entry into Tuscany. The Triumphal Arch of the Lorraine was erected at the Porta Galla in celebration, where it remains today. Their stay in Florence was brief. Charles VI soon recalled them, as he feared he might die while his heiress was miles away in Tuscany. In the summer of 1738, Austria suffered defeats during the ongoing Russo-Turkish War. The Turks reversed Austrian gains in Serbia, Wallachia, and Bosnia. The Viennese rioted at the cost of the war. Francis Stephen was popularly despised, as he was thought to be a cowardly French spy. The war was concluded the next year with the Treaty of Belgrade.

== Accession ==
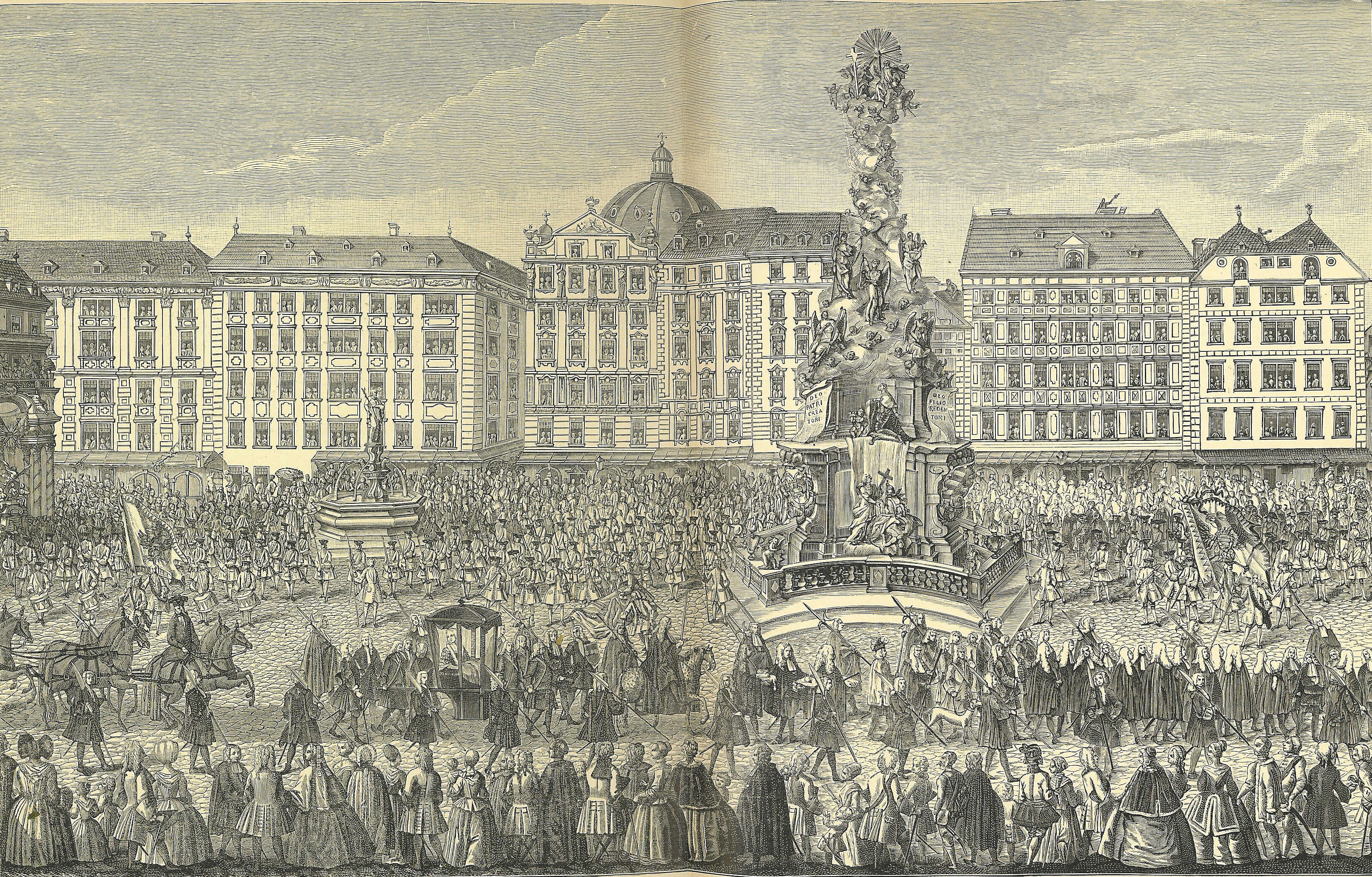
Maria Theresa's procession through the Graben, a square on Vienna, on 22 November 1740. The pregnant queen is on way to hear High Mass at St. Stephen's Cathedral before receiving homage.

Charles VI died on 20 October 1740, probably of mushroom poisoning. He had ignored the advice of Prince Eugene of Savoy who had urged him to concentrate on filling the treasury and equipping the army rather than on acquiring signatures of fellow monarchs. The Emperor, who spent his entire reign securing the Pragmatic Sanction, left Austria in an impoverished state, bankrupted by the recent Turkish war and the War of the Polish Succession; the treasury contained only 100,000 florins, which were claimed by his widow. The army had also been weakened due to these wars; instead of the full number of 160,000, the army had been reduced to about 108,000, and they were scattered in small areas from the Austrian Netherlands to Transylvania, and from Silesia to Tuscany. They were also poorly trained, and discipline was lacking. Later Maria Theresa even made a remark: "As for the state in which I found the army, I cannot begin to describe it."

Maria Theresa found herself in a difficult situation. She did not know enough about matters of state, and she was unaware of the weakness of her father's ministers. She decided to rely on her father's advice to retain his counselors and to defer to her husband, whom she considered to be more experienced, on other matters. Both decisions later gave cause for regret. Ten years later, Maria Theresa recalled in her Political Testament the circumstances under which she had ascended: "I found myself without money, without credit, without army, without experience and knowledge of my own, and finally, also, without any counsel because each one of them at first wanted to wait and see how things would develop."

She dismissed the possibility that other countries might try to seize her territories and immediately started ensuring the imperial dignity for herself; since a woman could not be elected Holy Roman Empress, Maria Theresa wanted to secure the imperial office for her husband, but Francis Stephen did not possess enough land or rank within the Holy Roman Empire. (Note: Francis Stephen was at the time Grand Duke of Tuscany, but Tuscany had not been part of the Holy Roman Empire since the Peace of Westphalia. His only possessions within the Empire were the Duchy of Teschen and County of Falkenstein.Beales 2005, p. 190.) In order to make him eligible for the imperial throne and to enable him to vote in the imperial elections as king of Bohemia (which she could not do because of her sex), Maria Theresa made Francis Stephen co-ruler of the Austrian and Bohemian lands on 21 November 1740. It took more than a year for the Diet of Hungary to accept Francis Stephen as co-ruler, since they asserted that the sovereignty of Hungary could not be shared. Despite her love for him and his position as co-ruler, Maria Theresa never allowed her husband to decide matters of state and often dismissed him from council meetings when they disagreed.

The first display of the new queen's authority was the formal act of homage of the Lower Austrian Estates to her on 22 November 1740. It was an elaborate public event that served as a formal recognition and legitimation of her accession. The oath of fealty to Maria Theresa was taken on the same day in the Ritterstube of the Hofburg.

== War of the Austrian Succession ==
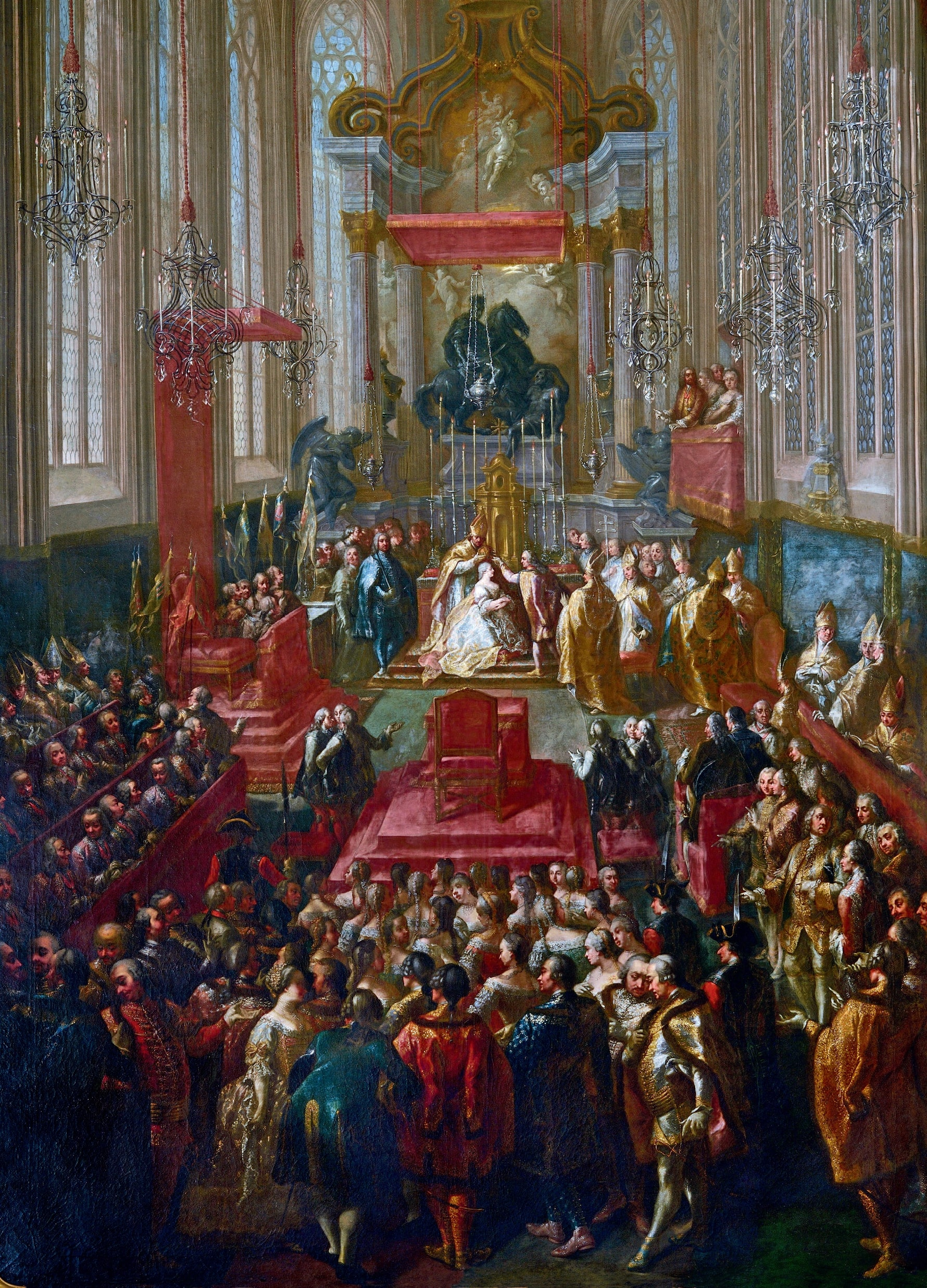
Maria Theresa being crowned queen of Hungary, St. Martin's Cathedral, Pressburg

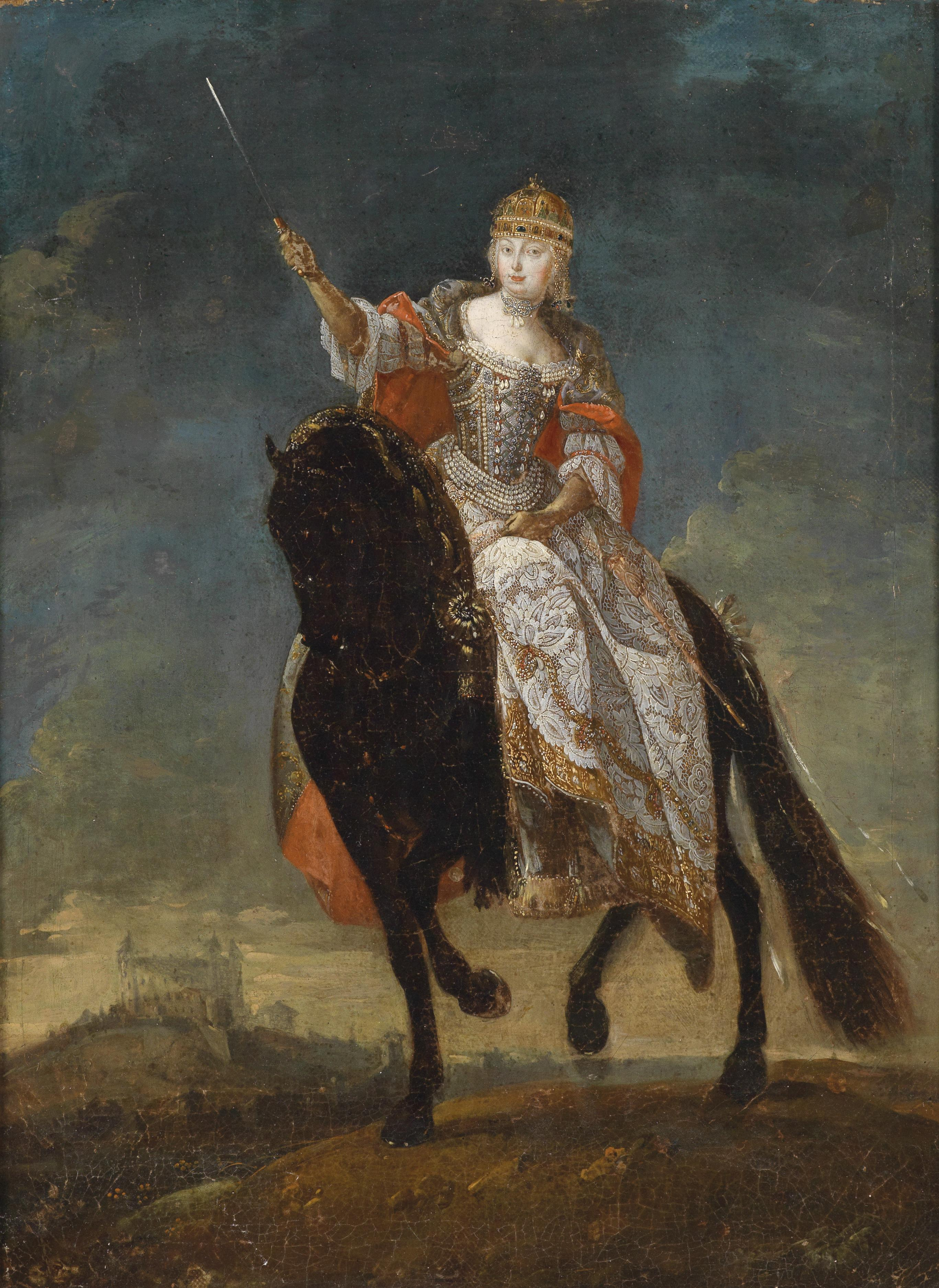
Maria Theresa as queen of Hungary

Immediately after her accession, a number of European sovereigns who had recognised Maria Theresa as heir broke their promises. Queen Elisabeth of Spain and Elector Charles Albert of Bavaria, married to Maria Theresa's deprived cousin Maria Amalia and supported by Empress Wilhelmine Amalia, coveted portions of her inheritance. Maria Theresa did secure recognition from King Charles Emmanuel III of Sardinia, who had not accepted the Pragmatic Sanction during her father's lifetime, in November 1740.

In December, Frederick II of Prussia invaded the Duchy of Silesia and requested that Maria Theresa cede it, threatening to join her enemies if she refused. Maria Theresa decided to fight for the mineral-rich province. Frederick even offered a compromise: he would defend Maria Theresa's rights if she agreed to cede to him at least a part of Silesia. Francis Stephen was inclined to consider such an arrangement, but the Queen and her advisers were not, fearing that any violation of the Pragmatic Sanction would invalidate the entire document. Maria Theresa's firmness soon assured Francis Stephen that they should fight for Silesia, (Note: The day after the entrance of Prussia into Silesia, Francis Stephen exclaimed to the Prussian envoy, Major General Borcke: "Better the Turks before Vienna, better the surrender of the Netherlands to France, better every concession to Bavaria and Saxony, than the renunciation of Silesia!"Browning 1994, p. 43.) and she was confident that she would retain "the jewel of the House of Austria". The resulting war with Prussia is known as the First Silesian War. The invasion of Silesia by Frederick was the start of a lifelong enmity; she referred to him thereafter as "that evil man".

As Austria was short of experienced military commanders, Maria Theresa released Marshal Wilhelm Reinhard von Neipperg, who had been imprisoned by her father for his poor performance in the Turkish War. Neipperg took command of the Austrian troops in March. The Austrians suffered a crushing defeat at the Battle of Mollwitz in April 1741. France drew up a plan to partition Austria between Prussia, Bavaria, Saxony and Spain: Bohemia and Upper Austria would be ceded to Bavaria, whose elector would become emperor, whereas Moravia and Upper Silesia would be granted to the Electorate of Saxony, Lower Silesia and Glatz to Prussia, and the entire Austrian Lombardy to Spain. Marshal Charles Louis Auguste Fouquet, duc de Belle-Isle joined Frederick at Olmütz. Vienna was in a panic, as none of Maria Theresa's advisors had expected France to betray them. Francis Stephen urged Maria Theresa to reach a rapprochement with Prussia, as did Great Britain. Maria Theresa reluctantly agreed to negotiations.

Contrary to all expectations, the young Queen gained significant support from Hungary. Her coronation as queen of Hungary suo jure took place in St. Martin's Cathedral, Pressburg (today's Bratislava), on 25 June 1741. She had spent months honing the equestrian skills necessary for the ceremony and negotiating with the Hungarian Diet. To appease those who considered her gender to be a serious obstacle, Maria Theresa assumed masculine titles. Thus, in nomenclature, Maria Theresa was archduke and king; normally, however, she was styled as queen.

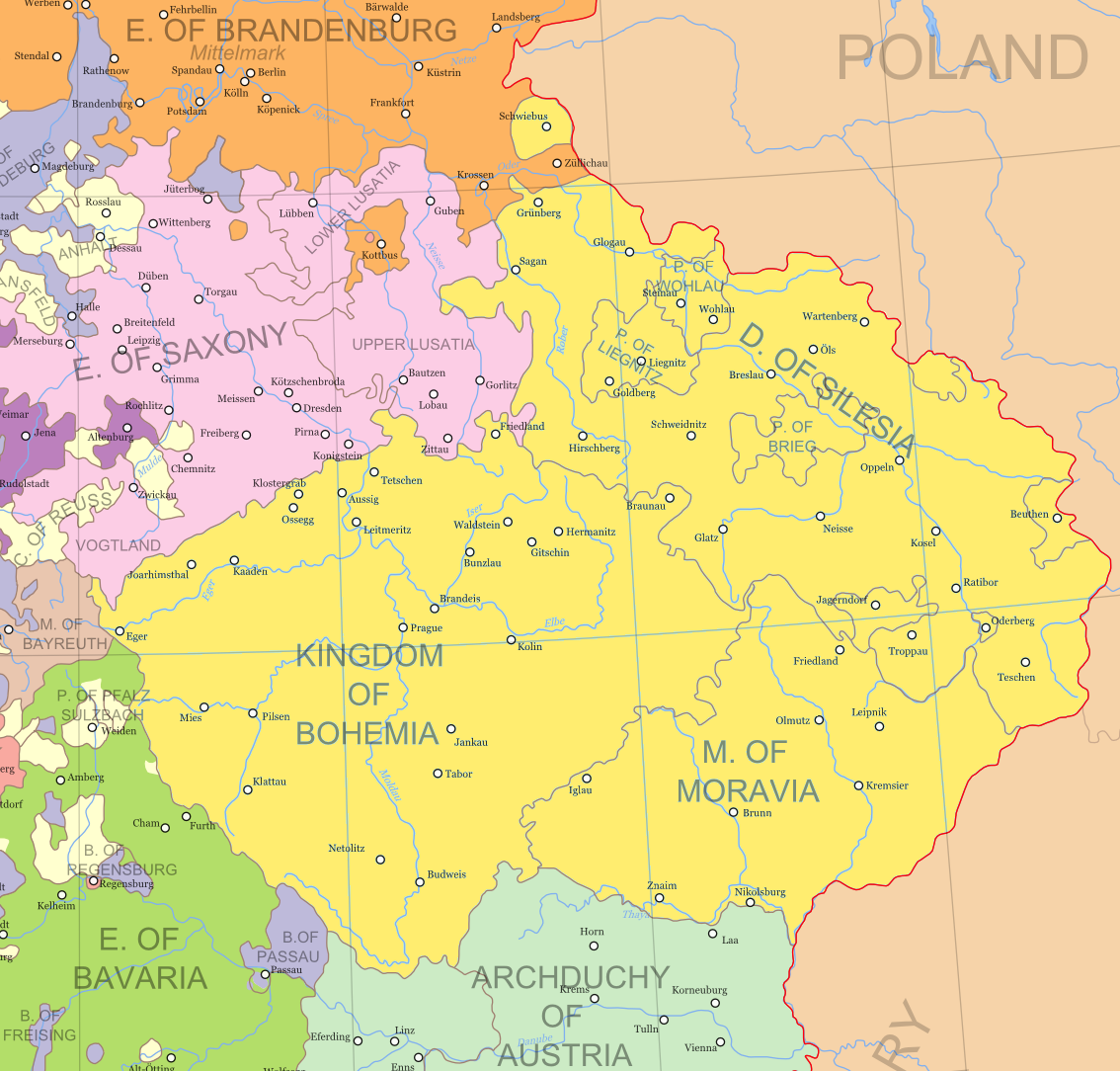
The Lands of the Bohemian Crown under Habsburg rule until 1742, when most of Silesia was ceded to Prussia

By July, attempts at conciliation had completely collapsed. Maria Theresa's ally, Augustus III of Poland, now became her enemy, and George II declared the Electorate of Hanover to be neutral. Therefore, she needed troops from Hungary in order to support the war effort. Although she had already won the admiration of the Hungarians, the number of volunteers was only in the hundreds. Since she required them in thousands or even tens of thousands, she decided to appear before the Hungarian Diet on 11 September 1741 while wearing the Holy Crown of Hungary. She began addressing the Diet in Latin, and she asserted that "the very existence of the Kingdom of Hungary, of our own person and children, and our crown, are at stake. Forsaken by all, we place our sole reliance in the fidelity and long-tried valor of the Hungarians." The response was rather boorish, with the Queen being questioned and even heckled by members of the Diet; someone cried that she "better apply to Satan than the Hungarians for help." However, she managed to show her gift for theatrical displays by holding her son and heir, Joseph, while weeping, and she dramatically consigned the future king to the defence of the "brave Hungarians". This act managed to win the sympathy of the members, and they declared that they would die for Maria Theresa.

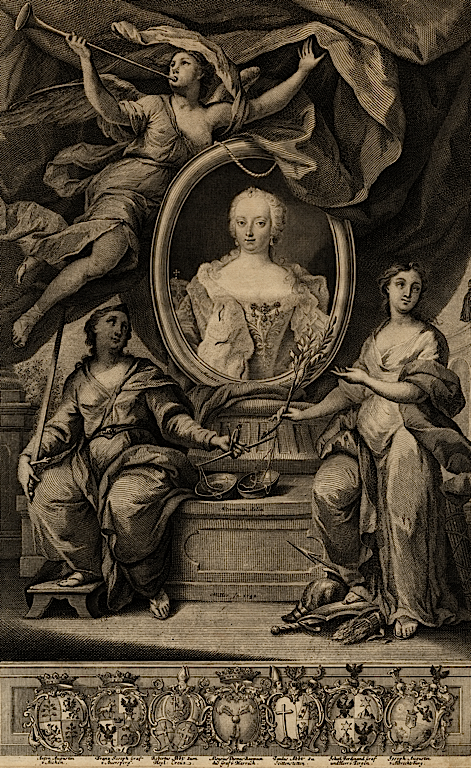
Engraved by Gustav Adolph Müller after Martin van Mytens, the Younger, Maria Theresa of Austria, 1742, engraving

In 1741, the Austrian authorities informed Maria Theresa that the Bohemian populace would prefer Charles Albert, Elector of Bavaria, to her as sovereign. Maria Theresa, desperate and burdened by pregnancy, wrote plaintively to her sister: "I don't know if a town will remain to me for my delivery." She bitterly vowed to spare nothing and no one to defend her kingdom when she wrote to the Bohemian chancellor, Count Philip Kinsky: "My mind is made up. We must put everything at stake to save Bohemia." (Note: She explained her resolution to the Count furthermore: "I shall have all my armies, all my Hungarians killed off before I cede so much as an inch of ground."Browning 1994, p. 76.) On 26 October, the Elector of Bavaria captured Prague and declared himself king of Bohemia. Maria Theresa, then in Hungary, wept on learning of the loss of Bohemia. Charles Albert was unanimously elected Holy Roman Emperor as Charles VII on 24 January 1742, which made him the only non-Habsburg to be in that position since 1440. The Queen, who regarded the election as a catastrophe, caught her enemies unprepared by insisting on a winter campaign; the same day he was elected emperor, Austrian troops under Ludwig Andreas von Khevenhüller captured Munich, Charles Albert's capital.

She has, as you well know, a terrible hatred for France, with which nation it is most difficult for her to keep on good terms, but she controls this passion except when she thinks to her advantage to display it. She detests Your Majesty, but acknowledges your ability. She cannot forget the loss of Silesia, nor her grief over the soldiers she lost in wars with you.

— Prussian ambassador's letter to Frederick the Great (Note: At the end of the War of the Austrian Succession, Count Podewils was sent as an ambassador to the Austrian court by King Frederick II of Prussia. Podewils wrote detailed descriptions of Maria Theresa's physical appearance and how she spent her days.Mahan 1932, p. 230.)

The Treaty of Breslau of June 1742 ended hostilities between Austria and Prussia. With the First Silesian War at an end, the queen soon made the recovery of Bohemia her priority. French troops fled Bohemia in the winter of the same year. On 12 May 1743, Maria Theresa was crowned Queen of Bohemia in St. Vitus Cathedral suo jure.

Prussia became anxious at Austrian advances on the Rhine frontier, and Frederick again invaded Bohemia, beginning a Second Silesian War; Prussian troops sacked Prague in August 1744. The French plans fell apart when Charles VII died in January 1745. The French overran the Austrian Netherlands in May.

Francis Stephen was elected Holy Roman Emperor on 13 September 1745. Prussia recognised Francis as emperor, and Maria Theresa once again recognised the loss of Silesia (with the exception of Austrian Silesia by the Treaty of Dresden in December 1745, ending the Second Silesian War). The wider war dragged on for another three years, with fighting in northern Italy and the Austrian Netherlands; however, the core Habsburg domains of Austria, Hungary and Bohemia remained in Maria Theresa's possession. The Treaty of Aix-la-Chapelle (1748), which concluded the eight-year conflict, recognised Prussia's possession of Silesia, and Maria Theresa ceded the Duchy of Parma to Philip of Spain. France had successfully conquered the Austrian Netherlands, but Louis XV, wishing to prevent potential future wars with Austria, returned them to Maria Theresa.

== Seven Years' War ==
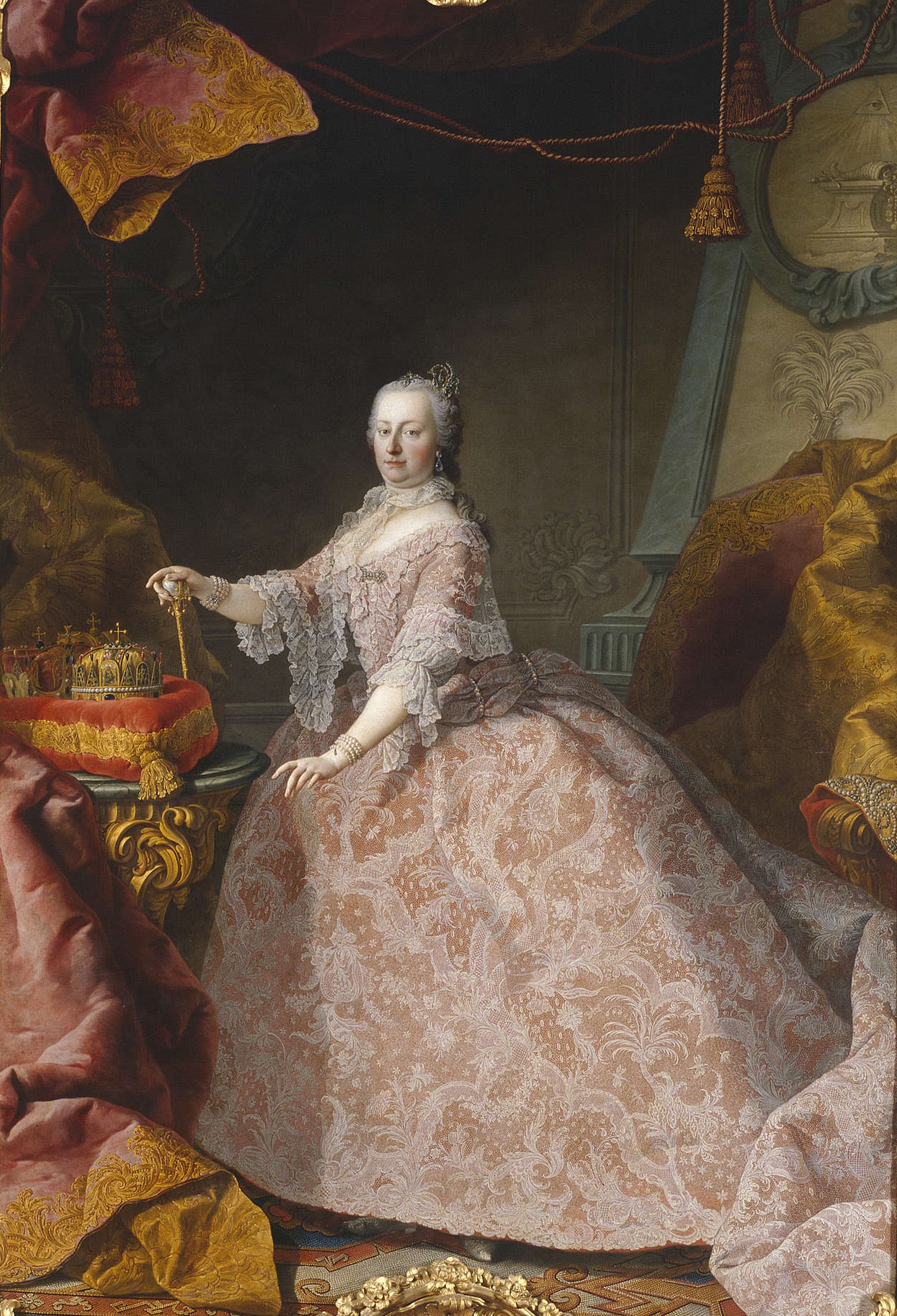
State portrait of Maria Theresa, showing her as the "first lady of Europe" in a dress made of Brabant bobbin lace. On her right are the Hungarian crown of St. Stephen, the Bohemian crown of St. Wenceslas and the Austrian archducal hat as symbols of her power and dignity (painting by Martin van Meytens, c. 1752).

Frederick of Prussia's invasion of Saxony in August 1756 began a Third Silesian War and sparked the wider Seven Years' War. Maria Theresa and Prince Kaunitz wished to exit the war with possession of Silesia. Before the war started, Kaunitz had been sent as an ambassador to Versailles from 1750 to 1753 to win over the French. Meanwhile, the British rebuffed requests from Maria Theresa to aid her in reclaiming Silesia, and Frederick II himself managed to secure the Treaty of Westminster (1756) with them. Subsequently, Maria Theresa sent Georg Adam, Prince of Starhemberg, to negotiate an agreement with France, and the result was the First Treaty of Versailles of 1 May 1756. Thus, the efforts of Kaunitz and Starhemberg managed to pave a way for a Diplomatic Revolution; previously, France was one of Austria's archenemies together with Russia and the Ottoman Empire, but after the agreement, they were united by a common cause against Prussia. However, historians have blamed this treaty for France's devastating defeats in the war, since Louis XV was required to deploy troops in Germany and to provide subsidies of 25 – 30 million pounds a year to Maria Theresa that were vital for the Austrian war effort in Bohemia and Silesia.

On 1 May 1757, the Second Treaty of Versailles was signed, whereby Louis XV promised to provide Austria with 130,000 men in addition to 12 million florins yearly. They would also continue the war in Continental Europe until Prussia could be compelled to abandon Silesia and Glatz. In return, Austria would cede several towns in the Austrian Netherlands to the son-in-law of Louis XV, Philip of Parma, who in turn would grant his Italian duchies to Maria Theresa.

Maximilian von Browne commanded the Austrian troops. Following the indecisive Battle of Lobositz in 1756, he was replaced by Prince Charles Alexander of Lorraine, Maria Theresa's brother-in-law. However, he was appointed only because of his familial relations; he turned out to be an incompetent military leader, and he was replaced by Leopold Joseph von Daun, Franz Moritz von Lacy and Ernst Gideon von Laudon. Frederick himself was startled by Lobositz; he eventually regrouped for another attack in June 1757. The Battle of Kolín that followed was a decisive victory for Austria. Frederick lost one-third of his troops, and before the battle was over, he had left the scene. Subsequently, Prussia was defeated at Hochkirch in Saxony on 14 October 1758, at Kunersdorf in Brandenburg on 12 August 1759, and at Landeshut near Glatz in June 1760. Hungarian and Croat light hussars led by Count Hadik raided Berlin in 1757. Austrian and Russian troops even occupied Berlin for several days in August 1760. However, these victories did not enable the Habsburgs to win the war, as the French and Habsburg armies were destroyed by Frederick at Rossbach in 1757. After the defeat in Torgau on 3 November 1760, Maria Theresa realised that she could no longer reclaim Silesia without Russian support, which vanished after the death of Empress Elizabeth in early 1762. In the meantime, France was losing badly in America and India, and thus they had reduced their subsidies by 50%. Since 1761, Kaunitz had tried to organise a diplomatic congress to take advantage of the accession of George III of Great Britain, as he did not really care about Germany. Finally, the war was concluded by the Treaty of Hubertusburg and Paris in 1763. Austria had to leave the Prussian territories that were occupied. Although Silesia remained under the control of Prussia, a new balance of power was created in Europe, and Austrian position was strengthened by it thanks to its alliance with the Bourbons in Madrid, Parma, and Naples. Maria Theresa herself decided to focus on domestic reforms and refrain from undertaking any further military operations.

== Family life ==
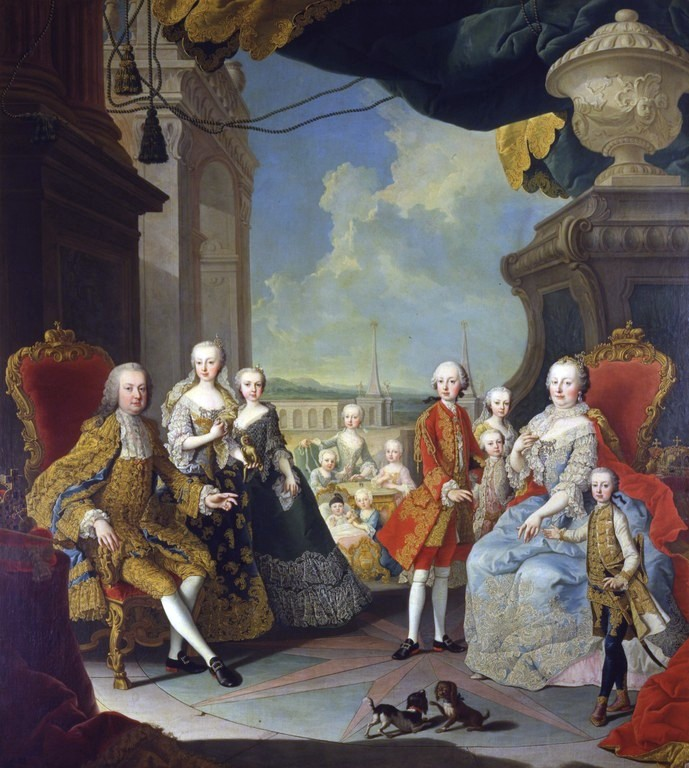
Maria Theresa with her family, 1754, by Martin van Meytens

=== Children ===
Maria Theresa gave birth to sixteen children in nineteen years from 1737 to 1756. Thirteen survived infancy, but only ten survived into adulthood. The first child, Maria Elisabeth (1737–1740), was born a little less than a year after the wedding. The child's sex caused great disappointment, and so would the births of Maria Anna, the eldest surviving child, and Maria Carolina (1740–1741). While fighting to preserve her inheritance, Maria Theresa gave birth to a son, Joseph, named after Saint Joseph, to whom she had repeatedly prayed for a male child during the pregnancy. Maria Theresa's favourite child, Maria Christina, was born on her 25th birthday, four days before the defeat of the Austrian army at Chotusitz. Five more children were born during the war: (the second) Maria Elisabeth, Charles, Maria Amalia, Leopold and (the second) Maria Carolina (b. & d. 1748). During this period, there was no rest for Maria Theresa during pregnancies or around the births; the war and child-bearing were carried on simultaneously. Five children were born during the peace between the War of the Austrian Succession and the Seven Years' War: Maria Johanna, Maria Josepha, (the third), Maria Carolina, Ferdinand and Maria Antonia. She delivered her last child, Maximilian Francis, during the Seven Years' War, aged 39. Maria Theresa asserted that, had she not been almost always pregnant, she would have gone into battle herself.

=== Illnesses and deaths ===
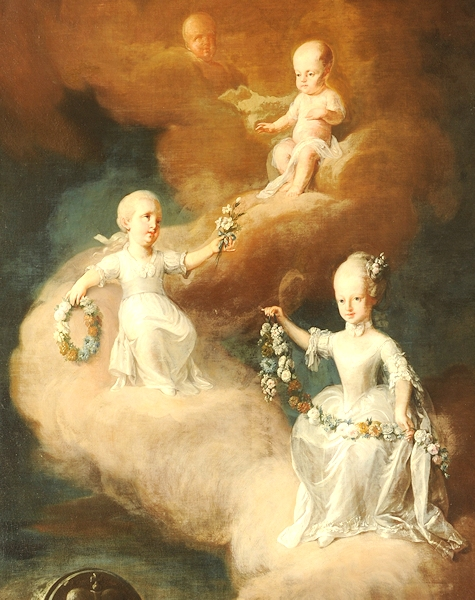
Mural by Franz Anton Maulbertsch in the Hofburg, Innsbruck, commissioned by Maria Theresa in remembrance of her daughters who died in childhood: Maria Johanna (1750–1762), Maria Elisabeth (1737–1740), Maria Carolina (1740–1741) and Maria Carolina (1748)

Four of Maria Theresa's children died before reaching adolescence. Her eldest daughter Maria Elisabeth died from stomach cramps at the age of three. Her third child, the first of three daughters named Maria Carolina, died shortly after her first birthday. The second Maria Carolina was born feet first in 1748. As it became evident that she would not survive, preparations were hastily made to baptise her while still living because of a belief that unbaptised infants would be condemned to eternity in limbo. Maria Theresa's physician, Gerard van Swieten assured her that the infant was still living when baptised, but many at court doubted this.

Maria Theresa's mother, Empress Elisabeth Christine, died in 1750. Four years later, Maria Theresa's governess, Marie Karoline von Fuchs-Mollard, died. She showed her gratitude to Countess Fuchs by having her buried in the Imperial Crypt along with the members of the imperial family.

Smallpox was a constant threat to members of the royal family. Maria Theresa's daughter Maria Christina survived a bout of the disease in July 1749, as did Maria Theresa's eldest son Joseph in January 1757. In January 1761, the disease killed her second son Charles at the age of fifteen. In December 1762, her twelve-year-old daughter Johanna likewise died in agony from the disease. In November 1763, Joseph's first wife, Isabella of Parma, died from the disease. Joseph's second wife, Maria Josepha of Bavaria, likewise caught the disease in May 1767 and died a week later. Maria Theresa ignored the risk of infection and embraced her daughter-in-law before the sick chamber was sealed to outsiders.

Maria Theresa, in fact, contracted smallpox from Maria Josepha. Throughout the city, prayers were made for her recovery, and the sacrament was displayed in all churches. Joseph slept in one of his mother's antechambers and hardly left her bedside. On 1 June, Maria Theresa was given the last rites. When the news came in early June that she had survived the crisis, there was huge rejoicing at the court and amongst the populace of Vienna.

In October 1767, Maria Theresa's sixteen-year-old daughter Josepha also showed signs of the disease. It was assumed that she had caught the infection when she went with her mother to pray in the Imperial Crypt next to the unsealed tomb of Empress Maria Josepha. Archduchess Josepha started showing a smallpox rash two days after visiting the crypt and soon died. Maria Carolina was to replace her as the predetermined bride of King Ferdinand IV of Naples. Maria Theresa blamed herself for her daughter's death for the rest of her life because, at the time, the concept of an extended incubation period was largely unknown, and it was believed that Josepha had caught smallpox from the body of the late empress. (Note: It takes at least a week for the smallpox rash to appear after a person is infected. Since the rash appeared two days after Josepha had visited the vault, the Archduchess must have been infected much before visiting the vault.Hopkins 2002, p. 64.) The last in the family to be infected with the illness was the twenty-four-year-old Elisabeth, Maria Theresa's sixth child. Although she recovered, she was badly scarred with pock marks from the illness. Maria Theresa's losses to smallpox, especially in the epidemic of 1767, were decisive in her sponsoring trials to prevent the illness through inoculation, and subsequently insisting on members of the imperial family receiving inoculation.

=== Dynastic marriage policy ===
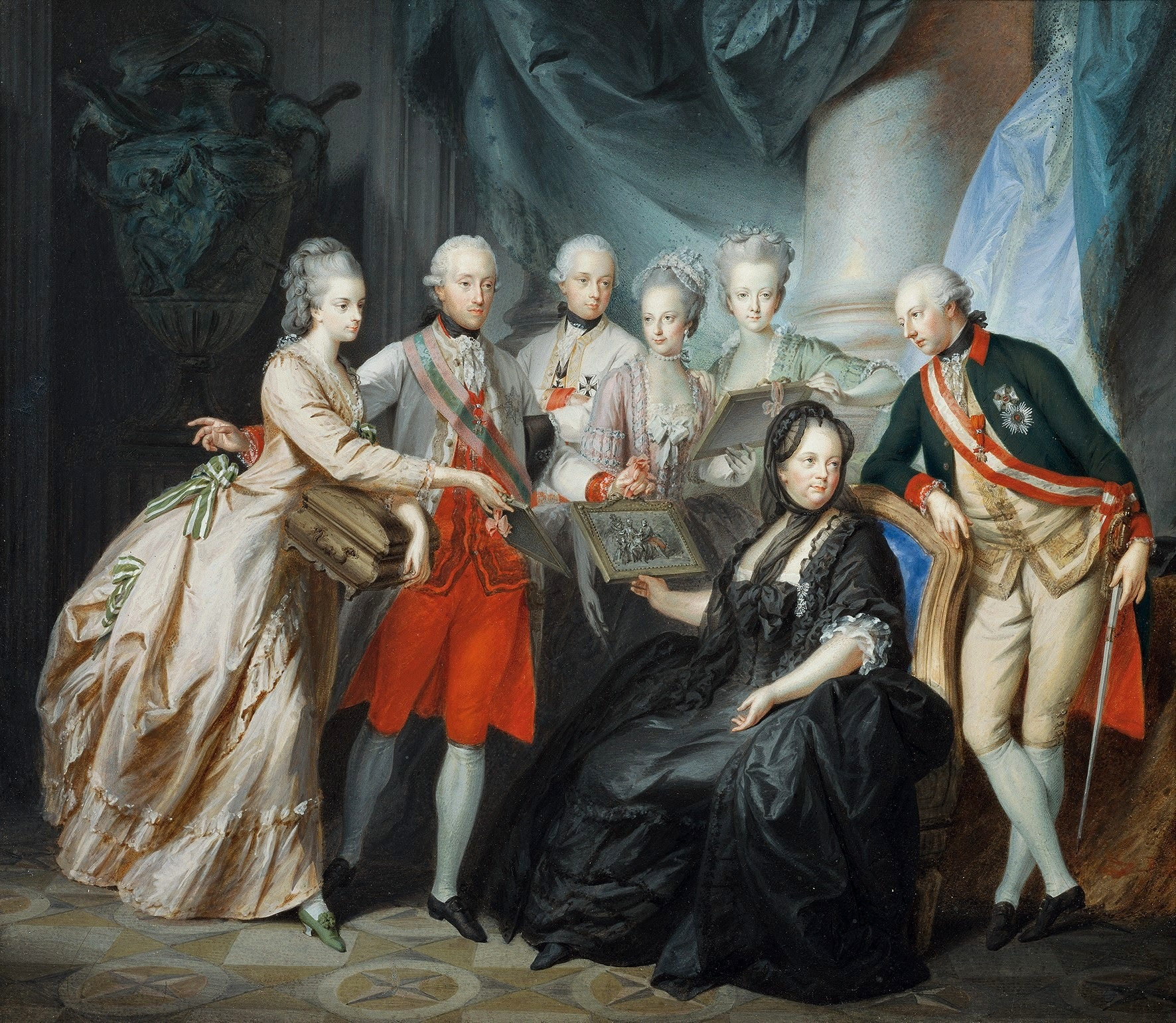
The dowager empress with family, 1776, by Heinrich Füger

Shortly after giving birth to the younger children, Maria Theresa was confronted with the task of marrying off the elder ones. She led the marriage negotiations along with the campaigns of her wars and the duties of the state. She used them as pawns in dynastic games and sacrificed their happiness for the state. A devoted but self-conscious mother, she wrote to all of her children at least once a week and believed herself entitled to exercise authority over her children regardless of their age and rank.

In April 1770, Maria Theresa's youngest daughter, Maria Antonia, married Louis, Dauphin of France, by proxy in Vienna. Maria Antonia's education was neglected, and when the French showed an interest in her, her mother went about educating her as best she could about the court of Versailles and the French. Maria Theresa kept up a fortnightly correspondence with Maria Antonia, now called Marie Antoinette, in which she often reproached her for laziness and frivolity and scolded her for failing to conceive a child.

Maria Theresa was not just critical of Marie Antoinette. She disliked Leopold's reserve and often blamed him for being cold. She criticised Maria Carolina for her political activities, Ferdinand for his lack of organisation, and Maria Amalia for her poor French and haughtiness. The only child she did not constantly scold was Maria Christina, who enjoyed her mother's complete confidence, though she failed to please her mother in one aspect—she did not produce any surviving children.

One of Maria Theresa's greatest wishes was to have as many grandchildren as possible, but she had only about two dozen at the time of her death, of which all the eldest surviving daughters were named after her, except Princess Carolina of Parma, her eldest granddaughter by Maria Amalia. (Note: The eldest surviving daughters of Maria Theresa's children were Maria Theresa of Austria (by Joseph), Maria Theresa of Tuscany (by Leopold), Maria Theresa of Naples and Sicily (by Maria Carolina), Maria Theresa of Austria-Este (by Ferdinand) and Marie Thérèse of France (by Marie Antoinette).)

== Religious views and policies ==
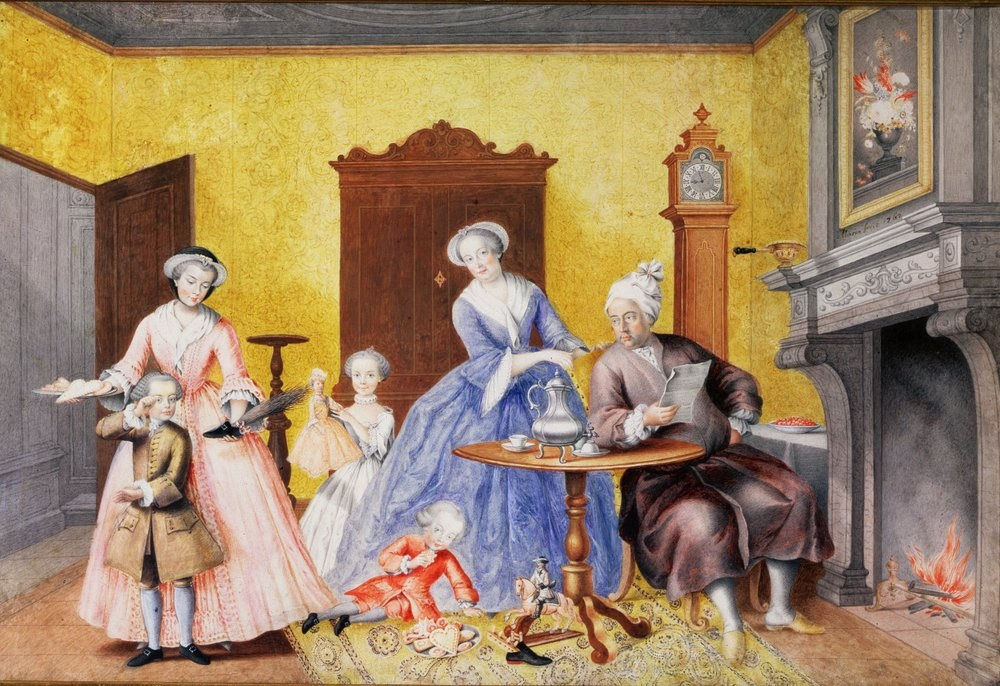
Maria Theresa and her family celebrating Saint Nicholas, by Archduchess Maria Christina, in 1762

Like all members of the House of Habsburg, Maria Theresa was a Catholic and a devout one. She believed that religious unity was necessary for a peaceful public life and explicitly rejected the idea of religious toleration. She even advocated for a state church (Note: In a letter to Joseph, she wrote: "What, without a dominant religion? Toleration, indifferentism, are exactly the right means to undermine everything... What other restraint exists? None. Neither the gallows nor the wheel... I speak politically now, not as a Christian. Nothing is so necessary and beneficial as religion. Would you allow everyone to act according to his fantasy? If there were no fixed cult, no subjection to the Church, where should we be? The law of might would take command."Crankshaw 1970, p. 302) and contemporary travellers criticised her regime as bigoted, intolerant, and superstitious. However, she never allowed the church to interfere with what she considered to be prerogatives of a monarch and kept Rome at arm's length. She controlled the selection of archbishops, bishops, and abbots. Overall, the ecclesiastical policies of Maria Theresa were enacted to ensure the primacy of state control in church-state relations. She was also influenced by Jansenist ideas. One of the most important aspects of Jansenism was the advocacy of maximum freedom of national churches from Rome. Although Austria had always stressed the rights of the state in relation to the church, Jansenism provided new theoretical justification for this.

Maria Theresa promoted the Greek Catholics and emphasised their equal status with Latin Church Catholics. Although Maria Theresa was a very pious person, she also enacted policies that suppressed exaggerated display of piety, such as the prohibition of public flagellantism. Furthermore, she significantly reduced the number of religious holidays and monastic orders.

=== Jesuits ===
Her relationship with the Jesuits was complex. Members of this order educated her, served as her confessors, and supervised the religious education of her eldest son. The Jesuits were powerful and influential in the early years of Maria Theresa's reign. However, the queen's ministers convinced her that the order posed a danger to her monarchical authority. Not without much hesitation and regret, she issued a decree that removed them from all the institutions of the monarchy, and carried it out thoroughly. She forbade the publication of Pope Clement XIII's Apostolicum pascendi bull, which was in favour of the Jesuits, and promptly confiscated their property when Pope Clement XIV suppressed the order.

=== Jews ===
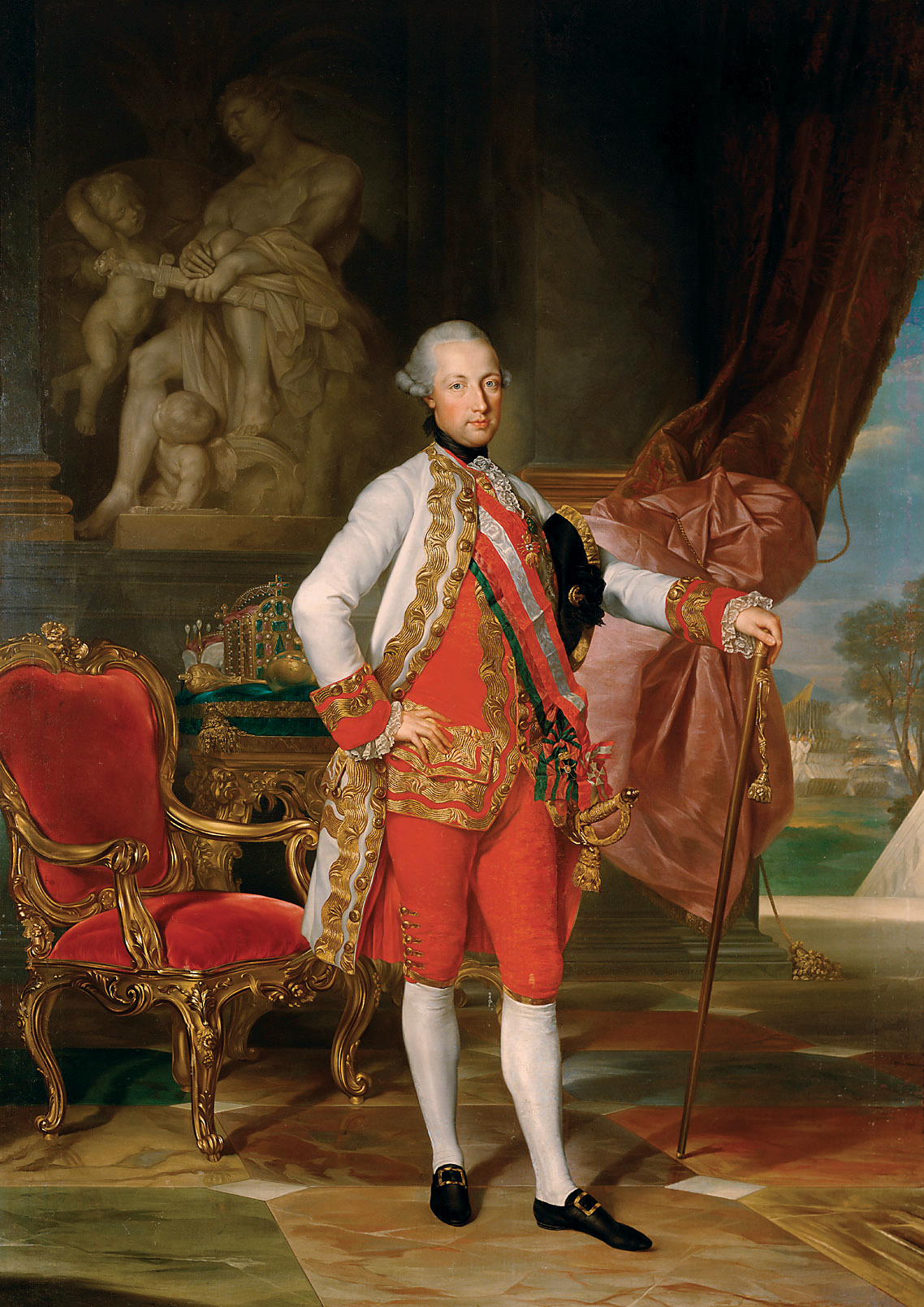
Joseph, Maria Theresa's eldest son and co-ruler, in 1775, by Anton von Maron

Maria Theresa regarded both the Jews and Protestants as dangerous to the state and actively tried to suppress them. She was probably the most anti-Jewish monarch of her time, having inherited the traditional prejudices of her ancestors and acquired new ones. This was a product of commonplace antisemitism and was not kept secret in her time. In 1777, she wrote of the Jews: "I know of no greater plague than this race, which, due to its deceit, usury, and avarice, is driving my subjects into beggary. Therefore, as far as possible, the Jews are to be kept away and avoided." Her hatred was so deep that she was willing to tolerate Protestant businessmen and financiers in Vienna, such as the Swiss-born Johann von Fries, since she wanted to break free from the Jewish financiers.

In December 1744, she proposed to her ministers the expulsion of around 10,000 Jews from Prague amid accusations that they were disloyal at the time of the Bavarian–French occupation during the War of the Austrian Succession. The order was then expanded to all Jews of Bohemia and the major cities of Moravia. Her first intention was to deport all Jews by 1 January, but having accepted the advice of her ministers, the deadline was postponed. The expulsion was executed only for Prague and only retracted in 1748 due to economic considerations and pressures from other countries, including Great Britain.

In the third decade of her reign, Maria Theresa issued edicts that offered some state protection to her Jewish subjects. She forbade the forcible conversion of Jewish children to Christianity in 1762, and in 1763 she forbade Catholic clergy from extracting surplice fees from her Jewish subjects. In 1764, she ordered the release of those Jews who had been jailed for a blood libel in the village of Orkuta. Notwithstanding her continuing strong dislike of Jews, Maria Theresa supported Jewish commercial and industrial activity in Austria. There were also parts of the realm where the Jews were treated better, such as Trieste, Gorizia and Vorarlberg.

=== Protestants ===
In contrast to Maria Theresa's efforts to expel the Jews, she aimed to convert the Protestants (whom she regarded as heretics) to Catholicism. Commissions were formed to seek out secret Protestants and intern them in workhouses, where they would be given the chance to subscribe to approved statements of Catholic faith. If they accepted, they were to be allowed to return to their homes. However, any sign of a return to Protestant practice was treated harshly, often by exile. Maria Theresa exiled Protestants from Austria to Transylvania, including 2,600 from Upper Austria in the 1750s. Her son and co-ruler Joseph regarded his mother's religious policies as "unjust, impious, impossible, harmful and ridiculous". Despite her policies, practical, demographic and economic considerations prevented her from expelling the Protestants en masse. In 1777, she abandoned the idea of expelling Moravian Protestants after Joseph, who was opposed to her intentions, threatened to abdicate as emperor and co-ruler. In February 1780, after a number of Moravians publicly declared their faith, Joseph demanded a general freedom to worship. However, Maria Theresa refused to grant this for as long as she lived. In May 1780, a group of Moravians who had assembled for a worship service on the occasion of her birthday were arrested and deported to Hungary. Freedom of religion was granted only in the Patent of Toleration issued by Joseph immediately after Maria Theresa's death.

=== Eastern Orthodox Christians ===
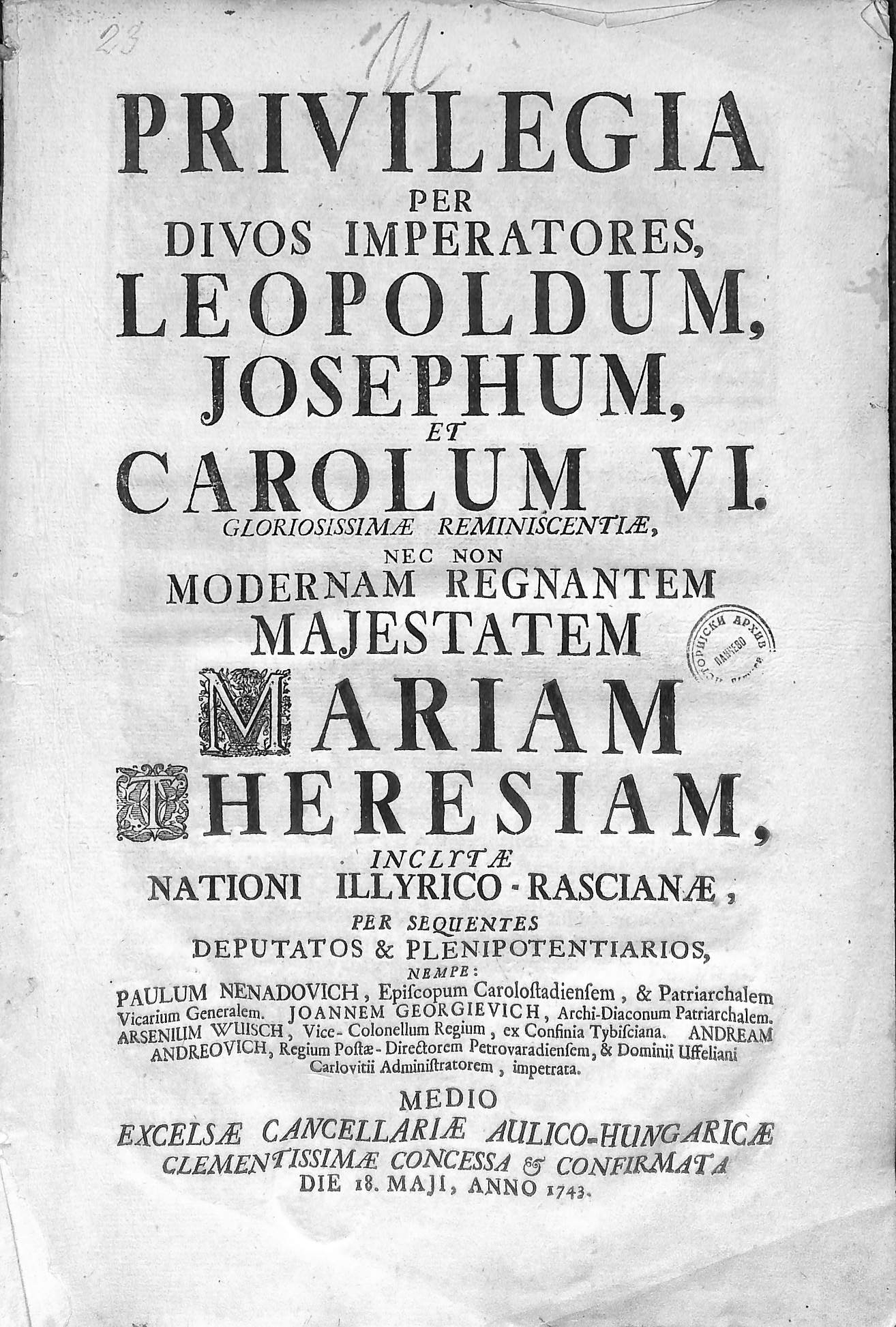
Confirmation of Serbian privileges, issued by Maria Theresa in 1743

The policies of Maria Theresa's government toward their Eastern Orthodox subjects were marked by special interests, relating not only to complex religious situations in various southern and eastern regions of the Habsburg monarchy, inhabited by Eastern Orthodox Christians, mainly Serbs and Romanians, but also regarding the political aspirations of the Habsburg court toward several neighbouring lands and regions in Southeastern Europe still held by the declining Ottoman Empire and inhabited by an Eastern Orthodox population.

Maria Theresa's government confirmed (1743) and continued to uphold old privileges granted to their Eastern Orthodox subjects by previous Habsburg monarchs (emperors Leopold I, Joseph I and Charles VI), but at the same time, reforms were enforced, establishing much firmer state control over the Serbian Orthodox Metropolitanate of Karlovci. Those reforms were initiated by royal patents, known as Regulamentum privilegiorum (1770) and Regulamentum Illyricae Nationis (1777), and finalised in 1779 by the Declaratory Rescript of the Illyrian Nation, a comprehensive document that regulated all major issues relating to the religious life of their Eastern Orthodox subjects and the administration of the Serbian Metropolitanate of Karlovci. Maria Theresa's rescript of 1779 was kept in force until 1868.

== Reforms ==
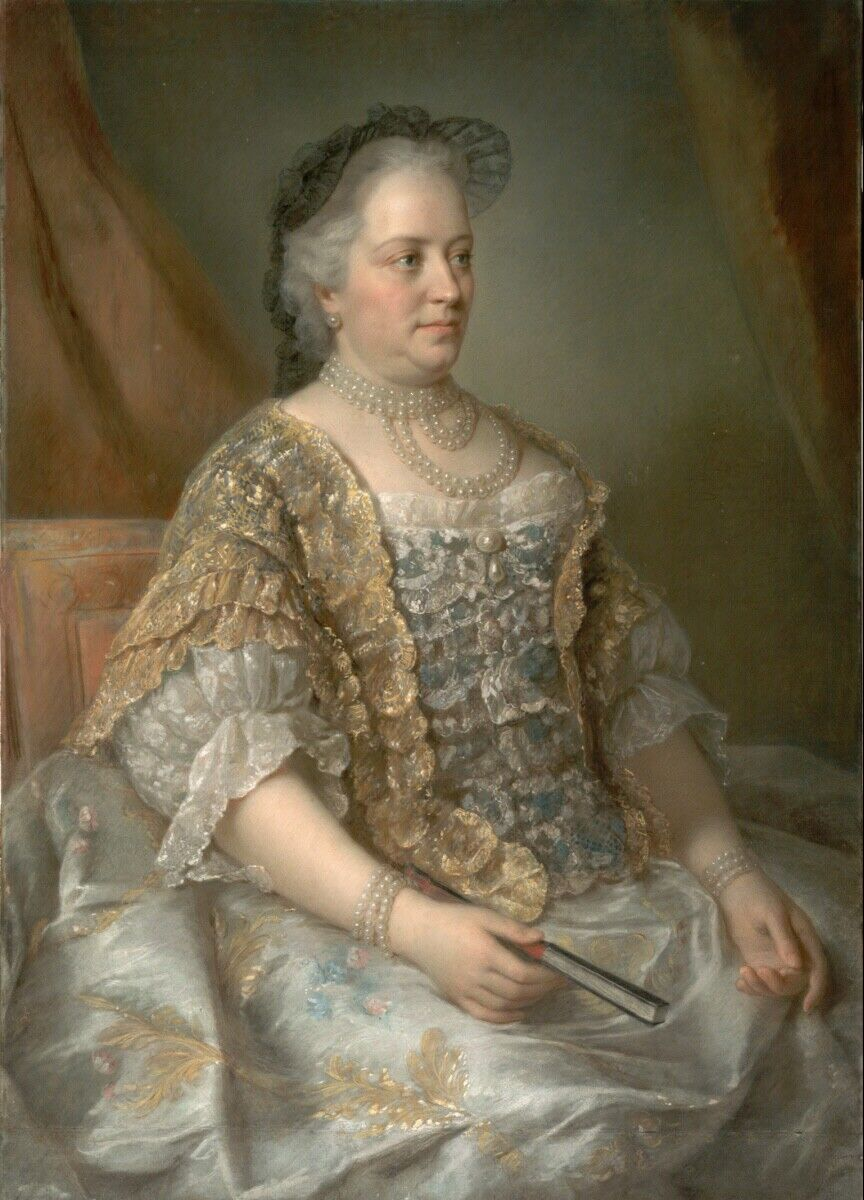
Maria Theresa in 1762, by Jean-Étienne Liotard

=== Institutional ===
Maria Theresa was as conservative in matters of state as in those of religion, but she implemented significant reforms to strengthen Austria's military and bureaucratic efficiency. She employed Friedrich Wilhelm von Haugwitz, who modernised the empire by creating a standing army of 108,000 men, paid for with 14 million florins extracted from crown lands. The central government was responsible for funding the army, although Haugwitz instituted taxation of the nobility, who had never before had to pay taxes. Moreover, after Haugwitz was appointed the head of the new central administrative agency, dubbed the Directory (Directorium in publicis et cameralibus), in 1749, he initiated a radical centralisation of state institutions down to the level of the District Office (Kreisamt). Thanks to this effort, by 1760 there was a class of government officials numbering around 10,000. However, the Duchy of Milan, the Austrian Netherlands, and Hungary were almost completely untouched by this reform. In the case of Hungary, Maria Theresa was particularly mindful of her promise that she would respect the privileges in the kingdom, including the immunity of nobles from taxation.

In light of the failure to reclaim Silesia during the Seven Years' War, the governing system was once again reformed to strengthen the state. The Directory was transformed into the United Austrian and Bohemian Chancellery in 1761, which was equipped with a separate, independent judiciary and separate financial bodies. She also refounded the Hofkammer in 1762, which was a ministry of finances that controlled all revenues from the monarchy. In addition to this, the Hofrechenskammer, or exchequer, was tasked with the handling of all financial accounts. Meanwhile, in 1760, Maria Theresa created the Council of State (Staatsrat), composed of the state chancellor, three members of the high nobility and three knights, which served as a committee of experienced people who advised her. The council of state lacked executive or legislative authority; nevertheless, it showed the difference between the form of government employed by Maria Theresa and that of Frederick II of Prussia. Unlike the latter, Maria Theresa was not an autocrat who acted as her own minister. Prussia would adopt this form of government only after 1807.

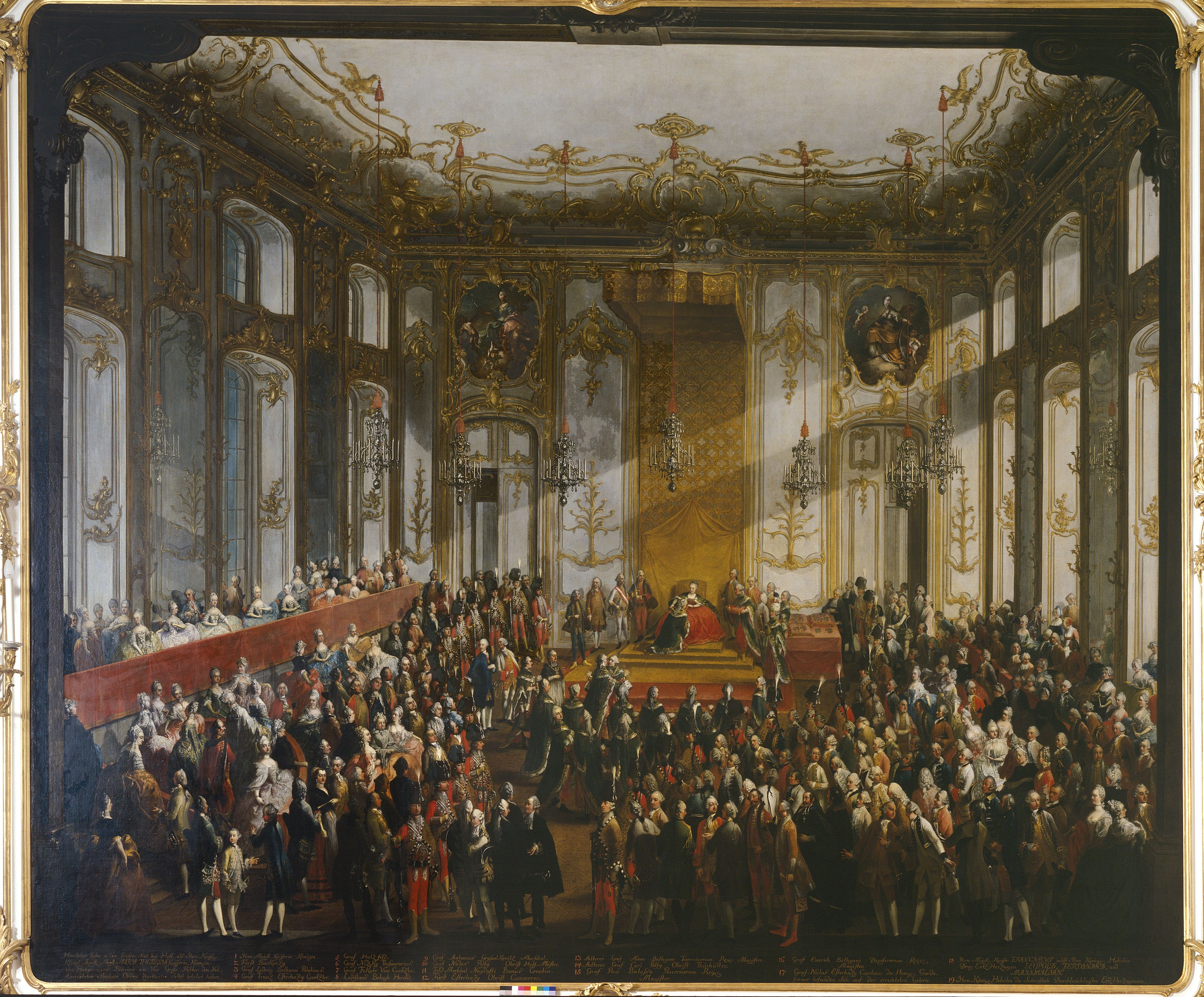
The imperial court of Maria Theresa at the Hofburg in Vienna

Maria Theresa doubled the state revenue from 20 to 40 million florins between 1754 and 1764, though her attempt to tax clergy and nobility was only partially successful. These financial reforms greatly improved the economy. After Kaunitz became the head of the new Staatsrat, he pursued a policy of "aristocratic enlightenment" that relied on persuasion to interact with the estates, and he was also willing to retract some of Haugwitz's centralisation to curry favour with them. Nonetheless, the governing system remained centralised, and a strong institution made it possible for Kaunitz to increase state revenues substantially. In 1775, the Habsburg monarchy achieved its first balanced budget, and by 1780, the Habsburg state revenue had reached 50 million florins.

=== Medicine ===
After Maria Theresa recruited Gerard van Swieten from the Netherlands, he also employed a fellow Dutchman named Anton de Haen, who founded the Viennese Medicine School (Wiener Medizinische Schule). Maria Theresa also banned the creation of new burial grounds without prior government permission, thus countering wasteful and unhygienic burial customs.

After the smallpox epidemic of 1767, she promoted inoculation, which she had learned of through her correspondence with Maria Antonia, Electress of Saxony (who in turn probably knew of it through her own correspondence with Frederick the Great). After unsuccessfully inviting the Sutton brothers from England to introduce their technique in Austria, Maria Theresa obtained information on current practices of smallpox inoculation in England. She overrode the objections of Gerard van Swieten (who doubted the effectiveness of the technique) and ordered that it be tried on thirty-four newborn orphans and sixty-seven orphans between the ages of five and fourteen years. The trial was successful, establishing that inoculation was effective in protecting against smallpox and safe (in the case of the test subjects). The Empress therefore ordered the construction of an inoculation centre, and had herself and two of her children inoculated. She promoted inoculation in Austria by hosting a dinner for the first sixty-five inoculated children in Schönbrunn Palace, waiting on the children herself. Maria Theresa was responsible for changing Austrian physicians' negative view of inoculation.

In 1770, she enacted a strict regulation of the sale of poisons, and apothecaries were obliged to keep a poison register recording the quantity and circumstances of every sale. If someone unknown tried to purchase a poison, that person had to provide two character witnesses before a sale could be effectuated. Three years later, she prohibited the use of lead in any eating or drinking vessels; the only permitted material for this purpose was pure tin.

=== Law ===
She is most unusually ambitious and hopes to make the House of Austria more renowned than it has ever been.

— Prussian ambassador's letter to Frederick II of Prussia

The centralisation of the Habsburg government necessitated the creation of a unified legal system. Previously, various lands in the Habsburg realm had their own laws. These laws were compiled, and the resulting Codex Theresianus could be used as a basis for legal unification. In 1769, the Constitutio Criminalis Theresiana was published, and this was a codification of the traditional criminal justice system since the Middle Ages. This criminal code allowed the possibility of establishing the truth through torture, and it also criminalised witchcraft and various religious offences. Although this law came into force in Austria and Bohemia, it was not valid in Hungary.

Maria Theresa is credited, however, in ending the witch hunts in Zagreb, opposing the methods used against Magda Logomer (also called Herrucina), who was the last prosecuted witch in Zagreb following her intervention.

She was particularly concerned with the sexual morality of her subjects. Thus, she established a Chastity Commission (Keuschheitskommission) in 1752 to clamp down on prostitution, homosexuality, adultery, and even sex between members of different religions. This Commission cooperated closely with the police, and the Commission even employed secret agents to investigate private lives of men and women with bad reputations. They were authorised to raid banquets, clubs, and private gatherings, and to arrest those suspected of violating social norms. The punishments included whipping, deportation, or even the death penalty.

In 1776, Austria outlawed torture, at the particular behest of Joseph II. Much unlike Joseph, with the support of religious authorities, Maria Theresa was opposed to the abolition of torture. Born and raised between the Baroque and Rococo eras, she found it difficult to fit into the intellectual sphere of the Enlightenment, which is why she only slowly followed humanitarian reforms on the continent.

From an institutional perspective, in 1749, she founded the Supreme Judiciary as a court of final appeal for all hereditary lands.

=== Education ===
Throughout her reign, Maria Theresa made the promotion of education a priority. Initially this was focused on the wealthier classes. She permitted non-Catholics to attend university and allowed the introduction of secular subjects (such as law), which influenced the decline of theology as the main foundation of university education. Furthermore, educational institutions were created to prepare officials for work in the state bureaucracy: the Theresianum was established in Vienna in 1746 to educate nobles' sons, a military school named the Theresian Military Academy was founded in Wiener Neustadt in 1751, and an Oriental Academy for future diplomats was created in 1754.

In the 1770s, reform of the schooling system for all levels of society became a major policy. Stollberg-Rilinger notes that the reform of the primary schools in particular was the most long-lasting success of Maria Theresa's later reign, and one of the few policy agendas in which she was not in open conflict with her son and nominal co-ruler Joseph II. The need for the reform became evident after the census of 1770–1771, which revealed the widespread illiteracy of the populace. Maria Theresa thereupon wrote to her rival Frederick II of Prussia to request him to allow the Silesian school reformer Johann Ignaz von Felbiger to move to Austria. Felbiger's first proposals were made law by December 1774. Austrian historian Karl Vocelka observed that the educational reforms enacted by Maria Theresa were "really founded on Enlightenment ideas," although the ulterior motive was still to "meet the needs of an absolutist state, as an increasingly sophisticated and complicated society and economy required new administrators, officers, diplomats, and specialists in virtually every area."

Maria Theresa's reform established secular primary schools, which children of both sexes from the ages of six to twelve were required to attend. The curriculum focused on social responsibility, social discipline, work ethic, and the use of reason rather than mere rote learning. Education was to be multilingual; children were to be instructed first in their mother tongue and then in later years in German. Prizes were given to the most able students to encourage ability. Attention was also given to raising the status and pay of teachers, who were forbidden to take on outside employment. Teacher training colleges were established to train teachers in the latest techniques.

The education reform was met with considerable opposition. Predictably, some of this came from peasants who wanted the children to work in the fields instead. Maria Theresa crushed the dissent by ordering the arrest of all those opposed. However, much of the opposition came from the imperial court, particularly among aristocrats who saw their power threatened by the reformers or those who feared that that greater literacy would expose the population to Protestant or Enlightenment ideas. Felbiger's reforms were nevertheless pushed through, as a result of the consistent support of Maria Theresa and her minister Franz Sales Greiner. The reform of the primary schools largely met Maria Theresa's aim of raising literacy standards, as evidenced by the higher proportions of children who attended school; this was particularly the case in the Archdiocese of Vienna, where school attendance increased from 40% in 1780 to a sensational 94% by 1807. Nevertheless, high rates of illiteracy persisted in some parts of Austria, half of the population was illiterate well into the 19th century, The teacher training colleges (in particular the Vienna Normal School) produced hundreds of new teachers who spread the new system over the following decades. However, the number of secondary schools decreased, since the quantity of new schools founded failed to make up for the numbers of Jesuit schools abolished. As a result, secondary schooling became more exclusive.

=== Censorship ===
Her regime was also known for institutionalising censorship of publications and learning. English author Sir Nathaniel Wraxall once wrote from Vienna: "[T]he injudicious bigotry of the Empress may chiefly be attributed to the deficiency [in learning]. It is hardly credible how many books and productions of every species and in every language are proscribed by her. Not only were Voltaire and Rousseau included in the list for the immoral tendency or licentious nature of their writings, but many authors whom we consider as unexceptionable or harmless experience a similar treatment." The censorship particularly affected works that were deemed to be against the Catholic religion. Ironically, for this purpose, she was aided by Gerard van Swieten, who was considered to be an "enlightened" man.

=== Economy ===
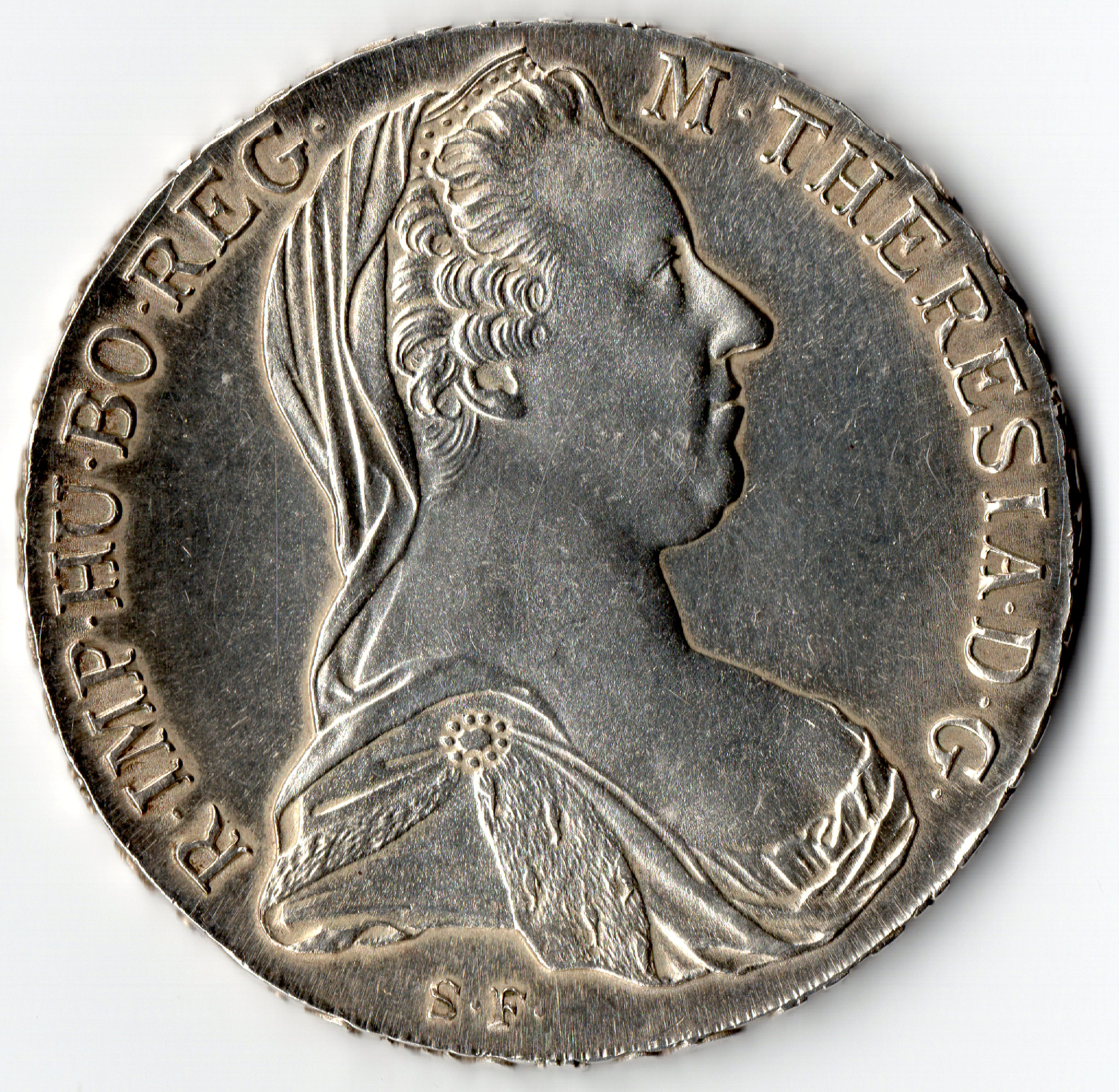
Maria Theresa depicted on her Thaler

Maria Theresa endeavoured to increase the living standards and quality of life of the people, since she could see a causal link between peasant living standards, productivity, and state revenue. The Habsburg government under her rule also tried to strengthen its industry through government interventions. After the loss of Silesia, they implemented subsidies and trade barriers to encourage the move of the Silesian textile industry to northern Bohemia. In addition, they cut back guild privileges, and internal duties on trade were either reformed or removed (such as the case for the Austrian-Bohemian lands in 1775).

In the late part of her reign, Maria Theresa undertook reform of the system of serfdom, which was the basis for agriculture in eastern parts of her lands (particularly Bohemia, Moravia, Hungary, and Galicia). Although Maria Theresa had initially been reluctant to meddle in such affairs, government interventions were made possible by the perceived need for economic power and the emergence of a functioning bureaucracy. The census of 1770–1771 gave the peasants opportunity to express their grievances directly to the royal commissioners and made evident to Maria Theresa the extent to which their poverty was the result of the extreme demands for forced labour (called "robota" in Czech) by the landlords. On some estates, the landlords demanded that the peasants work up to seven days per week in tilling the nobles' land so that the only time available for the peasants to till their own land was at night.

An additional prompt to reform was the famine, which afflicted the empire in the early 1770s. Bohemia was particularly hard hit. Maria Theresa was increasingly influenced by the reformers Franz Anton von Blanc and Tobias Philipp von Gebler, who called for radical changes to the serf system to allow the peasants to make a living. In 1771–1778, Maria Theresa issued a series of "Robot Patents" (i.e., regulations regarding forced labour), which regulated and restricted peasant labour only in the German and Bohemian parts of the realm. The goal was to ensure that peasants not only could support themselves and their family members but also help cover the national expenditure in peace or war.

By late 1772, Maria Theresa had decided on more radical reform. In 1773, she entrusted her minister, Franz Anton von Raab with a model project on the crown lands in Bohemia: he was tasked to divide up the large estates into small farms, convert the forced labour contracts into leases, and enable the farmers to pass the leaseholds onto their children. Raab pushed the project through so successfully that his name was identified with the program, which became known as Raabisation. After the success of the program on the crown lands, Maria Theresa had it also implemented on the former Jesuit lands, as well as crown lands in other parts of her empire.

However, Maria Theresa's attempts to extend the Raab system to the great estates belonging to the Bohemian nobles were fiercely resisted by the nobles. They claimed that the crown had no right to interfere with the serf system, since the nobles were the original owners of the land and had allowed the peasants to work it on stipulated conditions. The nobles also claimed that the system of forced labour had no connection with the peasants' poverty, which was a result of the peasants' own wastefulness and the increased royal taxes. Somewhat surprisingly, the nobles were supported by Maria Theresa's son and co-ruler Joseph II, who had earlier called for the abolition of serfdom. In a letter to his brother Leopold II, of 1775, Joseph complained that his mother intended to "abolish serfdom entirely and arbitrarily destroy the centuries-old property relations." He complained that "no consideration was being taken for the landlords, who were threatened with the loss of more than half their income." For many of them, who are carrying debts, this would mean financial ruin." By 1776, the court was polarised: on one side was a small reform party (including Maria Theresa, Raab, Blanc, Gebler and Greiner); on the conservative side were Joseph and the rest of the court. Joseph argued that it was difficult to find a middle way between the interests of the peasants and nobles; he suggested instead that the peasants negotiate with their landlords to reach an outcome. Joseph's biographer Derek Beales calls this change of course "puzzling". In the ensuing struggle, Joseph forced Blanc to leave the court. Because of the opposition, Maria Theresa was unable to carry out the planned reform and had to settle on a compromise. The system of serfdom was only abolished after Maria Theresa's death, in the Serfdom Patent (1781) issued (in another change of course) by Joseph II as sole ruler.

== Late reign ==
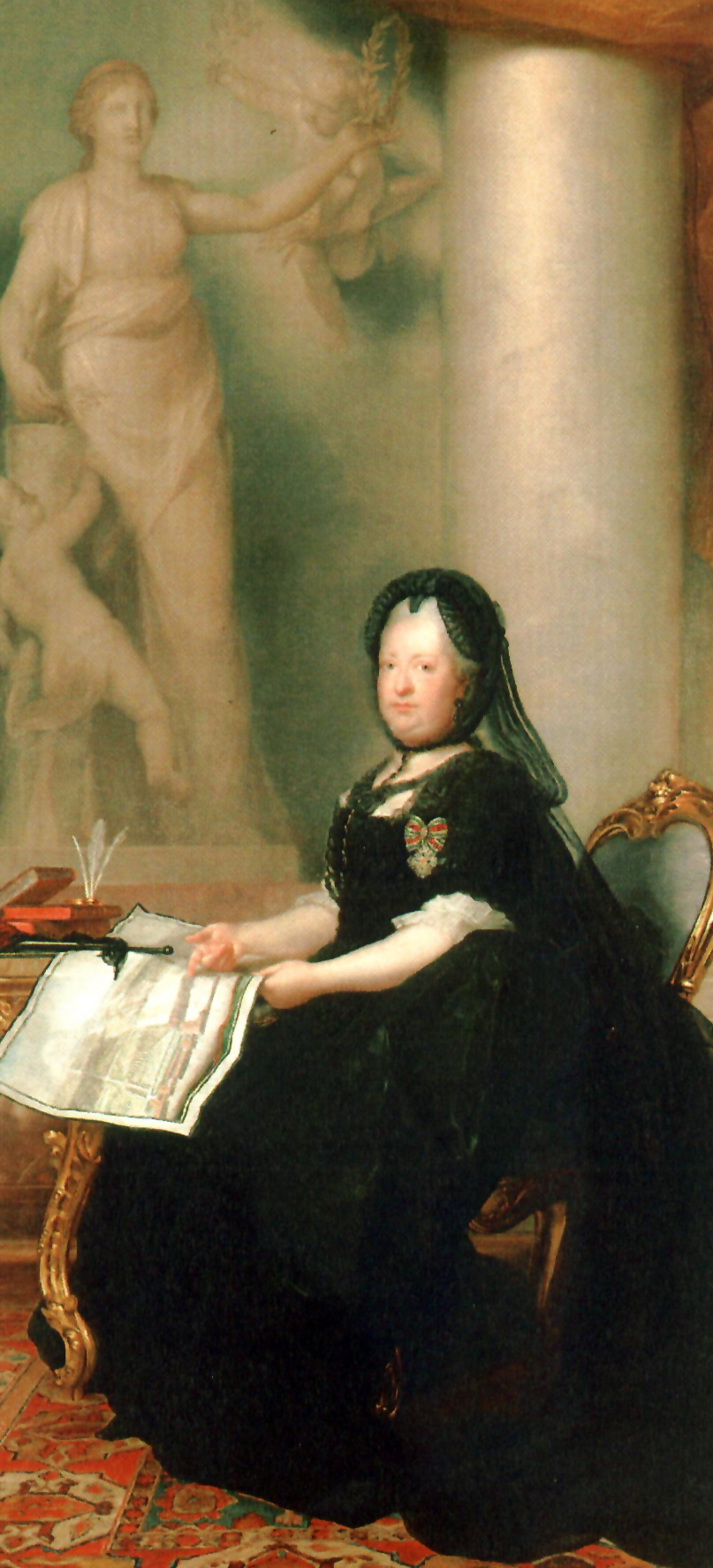
Maria Theresa as a widow in 1773, by Anton von Maron. Peace holds the olive crown above her head, reaffirming Maria Theresa's monarchical status. This was the last commissioned state portrait of Maria Theresa.

Emperor Francis died on 18 August 1765, while he and the court were in Innsbruck celebrating the wedding of his second surviving son, Leopold. Maria Theresa was devastated. Their eldest son, Joseph, became Holy Roman Emperor. Maria Theresa abandoned all ornamentation, had her hair cut short, painted her rooms black and dressed in mourning for the rest of her life. She completely withdrew from court life, public events, and theatre. Throughout her widowhood, she spent the whole of August and the eighteenth of each month alone in her chamber, which negatively affected her mental health. She described her state of mind shortly after Francis's death: "I hardly know myself now, for I have become like an animal with no true life or reasoning power."

Upon his accession to the imperial throne, Joseph ruled less land than his father had in 1740, since he had given up his rights over Tuscany to Leopold, and thus he only controlled Falkenstein and Teschen. Believing that the Emperor must possess enough land to maintain his standing as emperor, Maria Theresa, who was used to being assisted in the administration of her vast realms, declared Joseph to be her new co-ruler on 17 September 1765. From then on, mother and son had frequent ideological disagreements. The 22 million florins that Joseph inherited from his father was injected into the treasury. Maria Theresa had another loss in February 1766 when Haugwitz died. She gave her son absolute control over the military following the death of Leopold Joseph von Daun.

According to Austrian historian Robert A. Kann, Maria Theresa was a monarch of above-average qualifications but intellectually inferior to Joseph and Leopold. Kann asserts that she nevertheless possessed qualities appreciated in a monarch: warm heart, practical mind, firm determination and sound perception. Most importantly, she was ready to recognise the mental superiority of some of her advisers and to give way to a superior mind while enjoying support of her ministers even if their ideas differed from her own. Joseph, however, was never able to establish rapport with the same advisers, even though their philosophy of government was closer to Joseph's than to Maria Theresa's.

The relationship between Maria Theresa and Joseph was not without warmth but was complicated and their personalities clashed. Despite his intellect, Maria Theresa's force of personality often made Joseph cower. Sometimes, she openly admired his talents and achievements, but she was also not hesitant to rebuke him. She even wrote: "We never see each other except at dinner ... His temper gets worse every day ... Please burn this letter ... I just try to avoid public scandal." In another letter, also addressed to Joseph's companion, she complained: "He avoids me ... I am the only person in his way and so I am an obstruction and a burden ... Abdication alone can remedy matters." After much contemplation, she chose not to abdicate. Joseph himself often threatened to resign as co-regent and emperor, but he, too, was induced not to do so. Her threats of abdication were rarely taken seriously; Maria Theresa believed that her recovery from smallpox in 1767 was a sign that God wished her to reign until death. It was in Joseph's interest that she remained sovereign, for he often blamed her for his failures and thus avoided taking on the responsibilities of a monarch.

Joseph and Prince Kaunitz arranged the First Partition of Poland despite Maria Theresa's protestations. Her sense of justice pushed her to reject the idea of partition, which would hurt the Polish people. She even once argued, "What right have we to rob an innocent nation that it has hitherto been our boast to protect and support?" The duo argued that it was too late to abort now. Besides, Maria Theresa herself agreed with the partition when she realised that Frederick the Great of Prussia and Catherine the Great of Russia would do it with or without Austrian participation. Maria Theresa claimed and eventually took Galicia and Lodomeria; in the words of Frederick II, "the more she cried, the more she took".

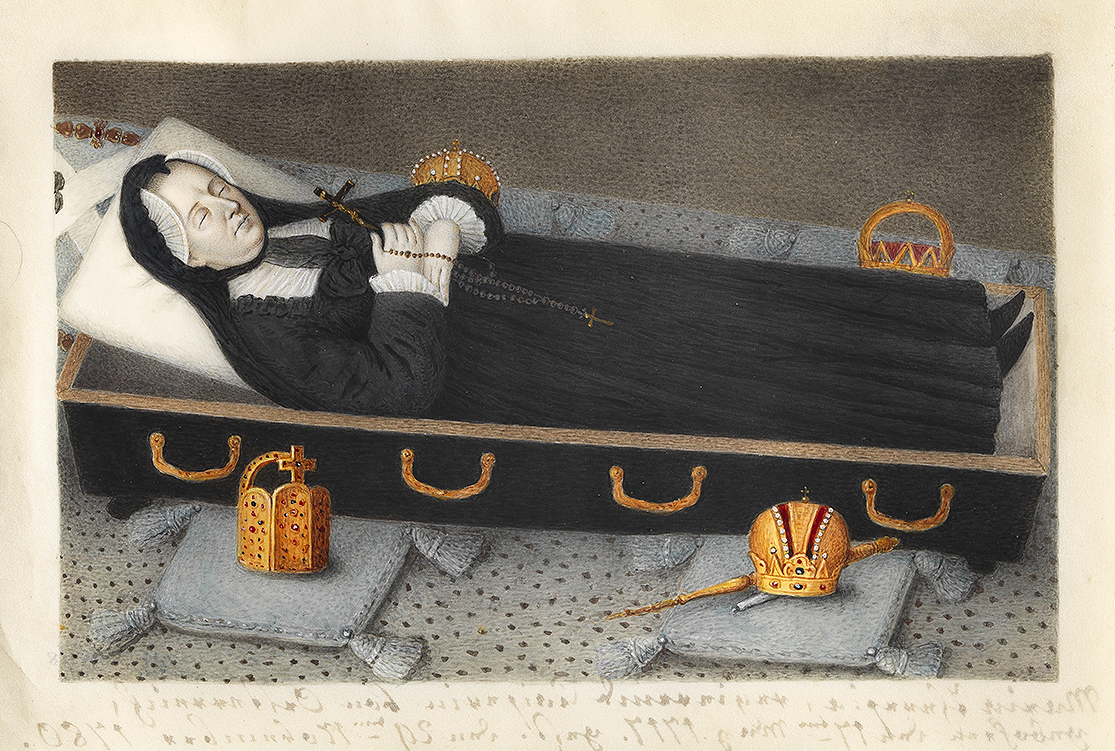
Post mortem portrait of Maria Theresa

A few years after the partition, Russia defeated the Ottoman Empire in the Russo-Turkish War (1768–1774). Following the signing of the Treaty of Küçük Kaynarca in 1774 that concluded the war, Austria entered into negotiations with the Sublime Porte. Thus, in 1775, the Ottoman Empire ceded the northwestern part of Moldavia (subsequently known as Bukovina) to Austria. Subsequently, on 30 December 1777, Maximilian III Joseph, Elector of Bavaria died without leaving any children. As a result, his territories were coveted by ambitious men, including Joseph, who tried to swap Bavaria for the Austrian Netherlands. This alarmed Frederick II of Prussia, and thus the War of the Bavarian Succession erupted in 1778. Maria Theresa very unwillingly consented to the occupation of Bavaria, and a year later she made peace proposals to Frederick II despite Joseph's objections. Although Austria managed to gain the Innviertel area, this "Potato War" caused a setback to the financial improvement that the Empress had made. The 500,000 florins in annual revenue from 100,000 inhabitants of Innviertel were not comparable to the 100,000,000 florins that were spent during the war.

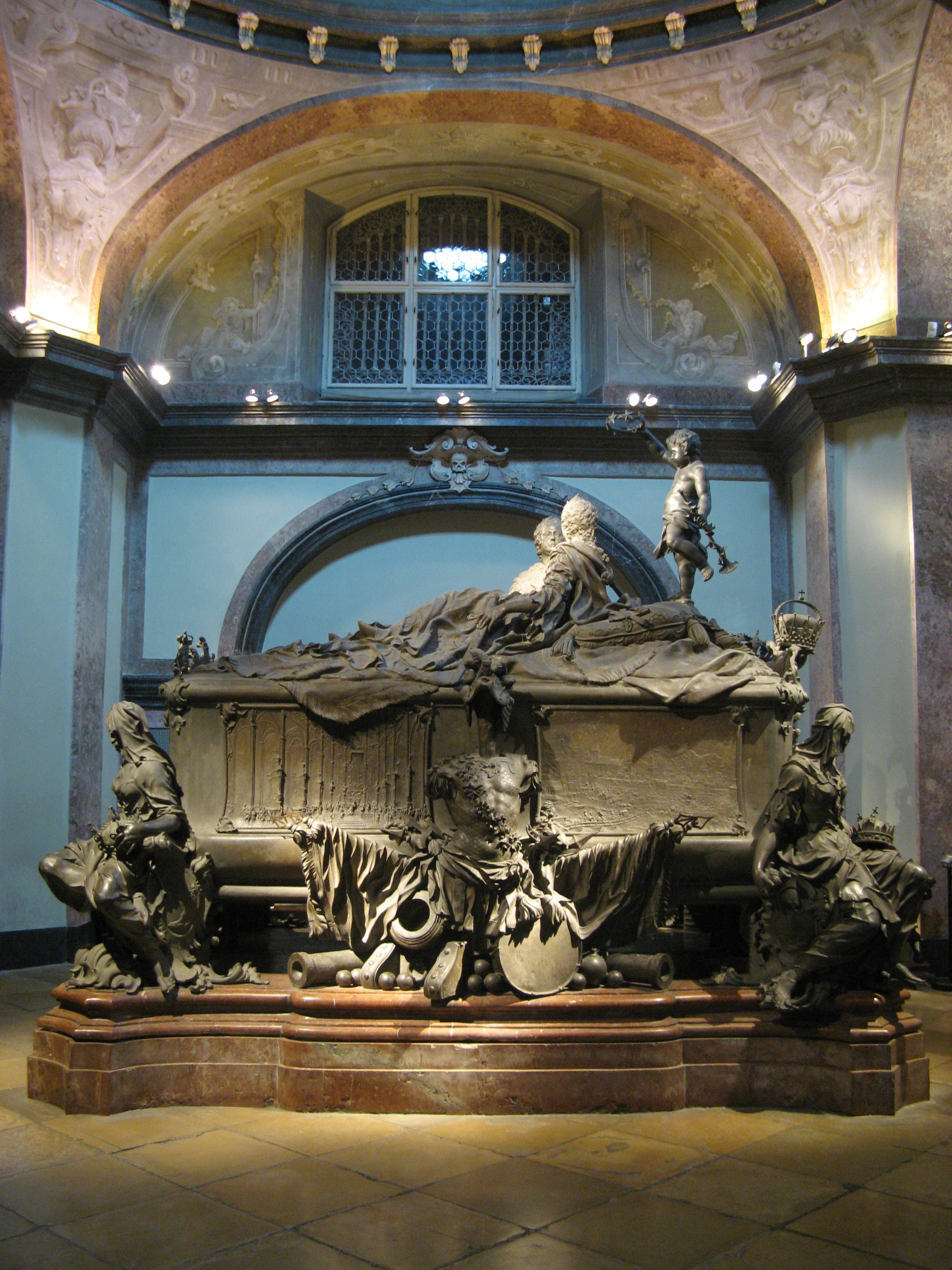
Maria Theresa and her husband are interred in the double tomb which she had inscribed as a widow. They lie buried in the Imperial Crypt in the Capuchin Church, Vienna.

It is unlikely that Maria Theresa ever completely recovered from the smallpox attack in 1767, as 18th-century writers asserted. She suffered from shortness of breath, fatigue, cough, distress, necrophobia and insomnia. She later developed edema.

Maria Theresa fell ill on 24 November 1780. Her physician, Dr. Störk, thought her condition serious, although her son Joseph was confident that she would recover in no time. By 26 November, she asked for the last rites, and on 28 November, the physician told her that the time had come. On 29 November, she died surrounded by her remaining children. Her body is buried in the Imperial Crypt in Vienna next to her husband in a coffin she had inscribed during her lifetime.

Her longtime rival Frederick the Great, on hearing of her death, said that she had honored her throne and her sex, and although he had fought against her in three wars, he never considered her his enemy. With her death, the original House of Habsburg died out and was replaced by the House of Habsburg-Lorraine. Joseph II, already co-sovereign of the Habsburg dominions, succeeded her and introduced sweeping reforms in the empire; Joseph produced nearly 700 edicts per year (or almost two per day), whereas Maria Theresa issued only about 100 edicts annually.

== Legacy ==
Maria Theresa understood the importance of her public persona and was able to simultaneously evoke both esteem and affection in her subjects; a notable example was how she projected dignity and simplicity to awe the people in Pressburg before she was crowned as Queen (Regnant) of Hungary. Her 40-year reign was considered to be very successful when compared to other Habsburg rulers. Her reforms had transformed the empire into a modern state with a significant international standing. She centralised and modernised its institutions, and her reign was considered as the beginning of the era of "enlightened absolutism" in Austria, with a brand new approach toward governing: the measures undertaken by rulers became more modern and rational, and thoughts were given to the welfare of the state and the people. Many of her policies were not in line with the ideals of the Enlightenment (such as her support of torture), and she was still very much influenced by Catholicism from the previous era. Vocelka even stated that "taken as a whole the reforms of Maria Theresa appear more absolutist and centralist than enlightened, even if one must admit that the influence of enlightened ideas is visible to a certain degree." Despite being among the most successful Habsburg monarchs and remarkable leaders of the 18th century, Maria Theresa has not captured the interest of contemporary historians or media, perhaps due her hardened nature.

=== Memorials and honours ===
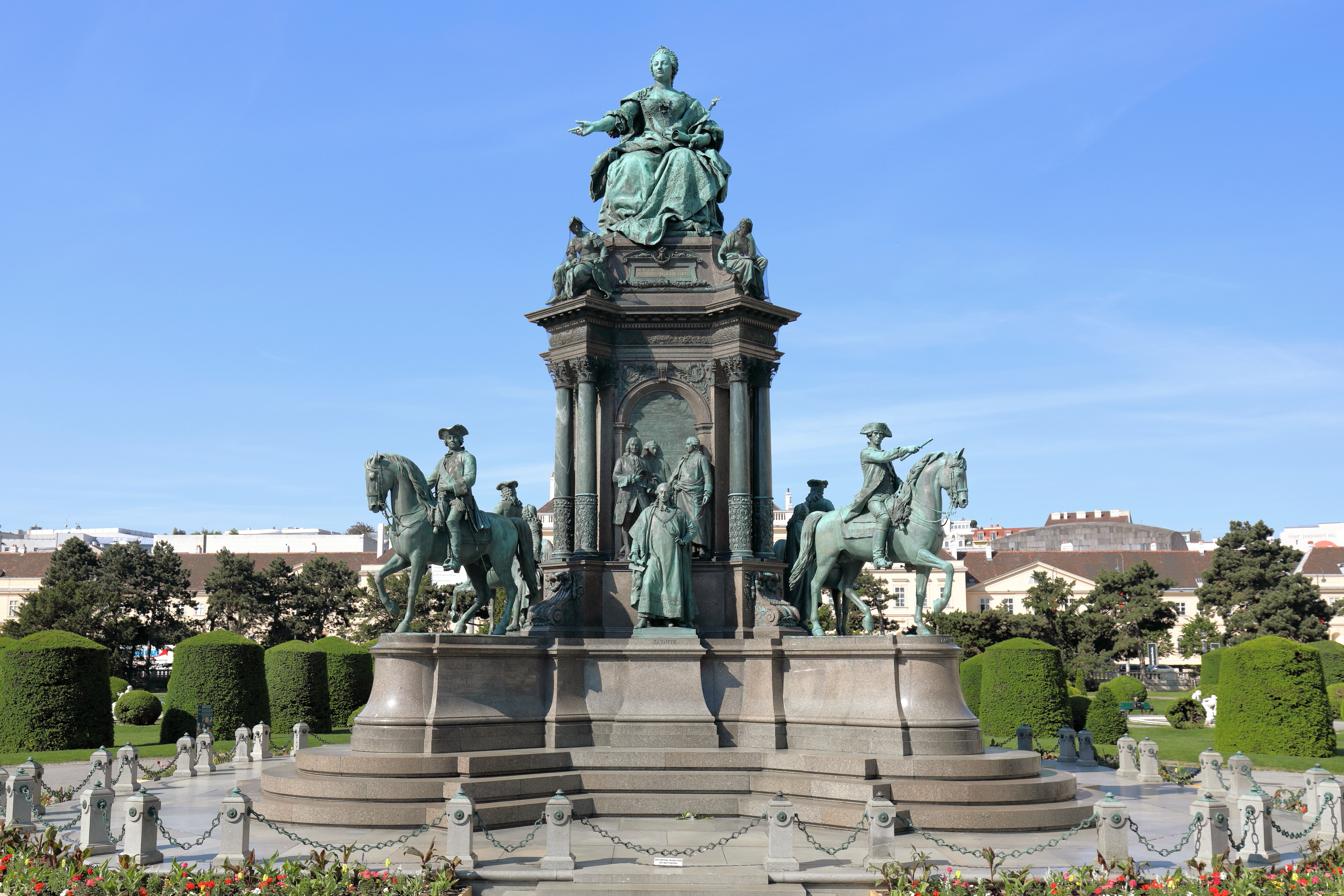
Maria Theresa Monument on the Maria-Theresien-Platz in Vienna, Austria

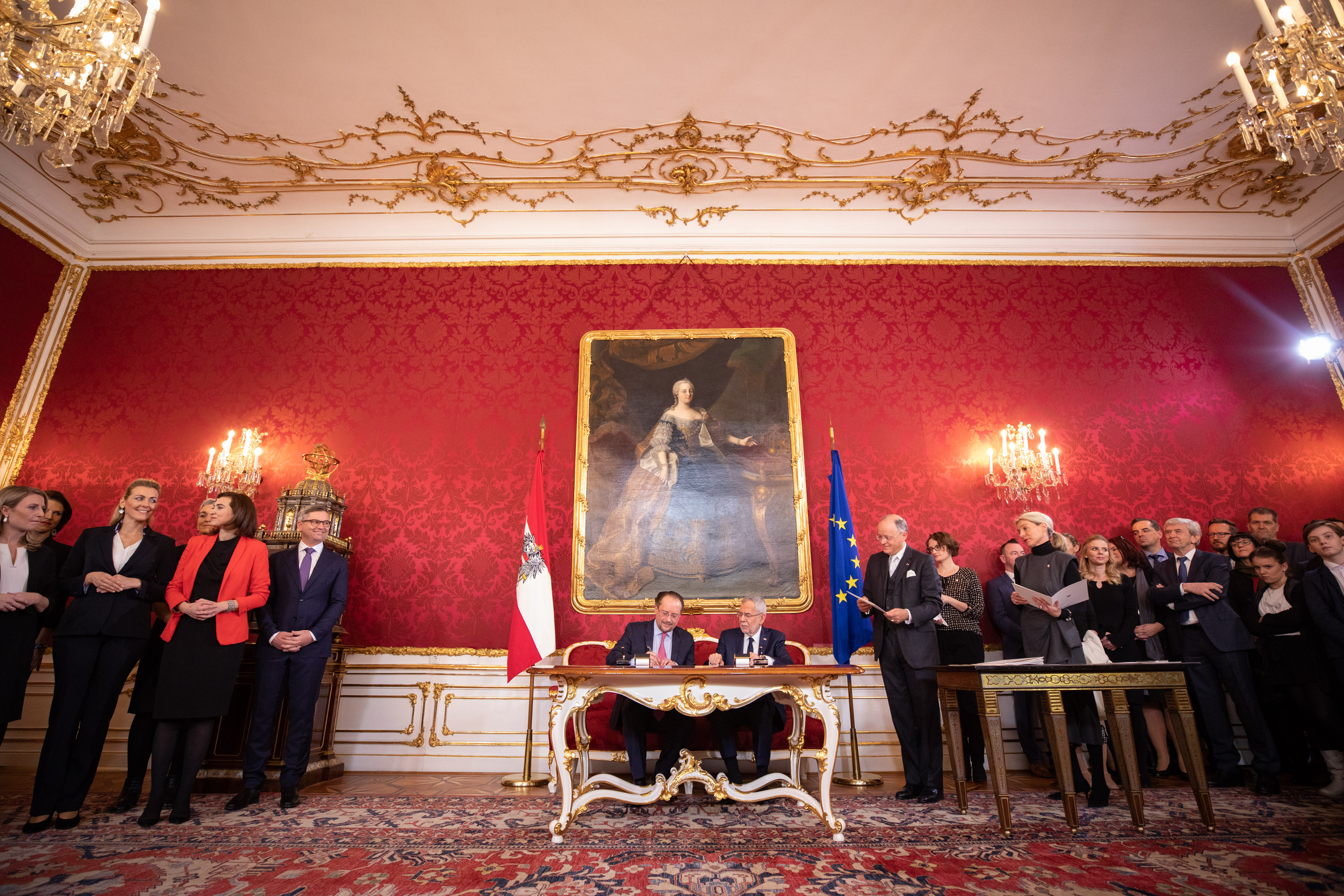
Oath of allegiance ceremony of cabinet II of Austrian chancellor Alexander Schallenberg in the Maria Theresa Room of the Hofburg palace (2020)

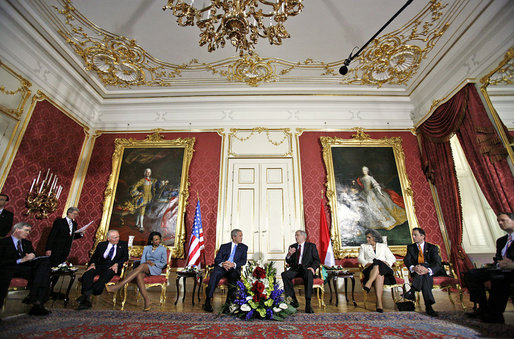
Hungarian President László Sólyom with US President George W. Bush in the Maria Theresa Room of Sándor Palace (2006)

A number of streets and squares were named after her throughout the empire as well as statues and monuments built. In Vienna a large bronze monument was built in her honour at Maria-Theresien-Platz in 1888. The Maria Theresia Garden Square (Uzhhorod) was constructed in her memory as recently as 2013.

In Slovakia, there was a monument called the Maria Teresa monument which stood on today's Ľudovít Štúr Square in Bratislava from 1897 to 1921.

The city of Subotica was renamed in her honor in 1779, as Maria-Theresiapolis, sometimes spelled as Maria-Theresiopel or Theresiopel.

A number of her descendants were named in her honour. These include:

- Archduchess Maria Theresa of Austria (1762–1770),
- Maria Theresa of Austria (1767–1827),
- Maria Theresa of Naples and Sicily,
- Maria Theresa of Austria-Este, Queen of Sardinia,
- Marie Thérèse of France,
- Maria Theresa of Austria (1801–1855),
- Maria Teresa of Savoy (1803–1879),
- Maria Theresa of Austria (1816–1867),
- Archduchess Maria Theresa of Austria-Este (1817–1886),
- Maria Theresa of Austria-Este (1849–1919),
- Princess Maria Teresa of Bourbon-Two Sicilies (1867–1909), and
- Archduchess Maria Theresa of Austria (1862–1933). Her granddaughter Maria Theresa of Naples and Sicily became Holy Roman Empress as well in 1792.

- The Imperial and Royal Navy ship SMS Kaiserin und Königin Maria Theresia was laid down in 1891.
- The Military Order of Maria Theresa was founded by her in 1757 and remained in existence until after World War I.
- The Theresianum was founded by her in 1746 and is one of Austria's finest schools.
- The Maria Theresa thaler was issued during her reign but was continued to be struck afterwards and became legal tender as far as the Persian Gulf region and Southeast Asia. The Austrian Mint continues to issue it.
- Asteroid 295 Theresia was named in her honour in 1890.
- The garrison town of Terezín (Theresienstadt) in Bohemia was constructed in 1780 and named after her.
- A crystal chandelier with Bohemian crystal glass was named in her honour and is known as the Marie Therese chandelier.
- 22nd SS Volunteer Cavalry Division 'Maria Theresia' (1943–1945)
- The Maria Theresa Room (Maria-Theresien-Zimmer) in the Leopoldine Wing of the Hofburg palace is named in her honour and a large state portrait of her by Martin van Meytens's school from 1741 depicting her in the Hungarian coronation dress hangs in the centre. All oath of allegiance ceremonies of a newly elected government of Austria are conducted in this room with the signing taking place underneath her portrait.
- The Maria Theresa Room is a room in the Sándor Palace, Budapest, the official residence of the President of Hungary. It has a portrait of the Queen dressed for her coronation, alongside a portrait of her husband Emperor Francis I on the other side. The room was especially tailored in memory of the reconciliation between the monarch and the government and is used for official state reception's.

=== In media ===
She has appeared as the main figure in a number of films and series such as the 1951 Maria Theresa and Maria Theresia, an Austria-Czech television miniseries from 2017. In the 2006 film Marie Antoinette, Marianne Faithfull portrayed Maria Theresa opposite Kirsten Dunst in the title role.

Years before, she appeared as a minor character in the 1938 film Marie Antoinette, starring Norma Shearer, in which she was portrayed by Alma Kruger.

She has appeared in the German documentary Die Deutschen season 1, episode 6 Preußens Friedrich und die Kaiserin in 2008.

Maria Theresia: The Musical, a biographic musical by Deiter Falk, Paul Falk, Jonathan Zalter and Thomas Kahry, opened at Ronacher Theatre, Vienna in October 2025.

== Titles, styles, honours, and arms ==
Monarchical styles of Mária Terézia of Hungary
- Reference style: Her Apostolic Majesty
- Spoken style: Your Apostolic Majesty

=== Titles and styles ===
Her title after the death of her husband was:

"Her Imperial and Royal Apostolic Majesty, Maria Theresa, by the Grace of God, Dowager Empress of the Romans, Queen of Hungary, of Bohemia, of Dalmatia, of Croatia, of Slavonia, of Galicia, of Lodomeria, etc.; Archduchess of Austria; Duchess of Burgundy, of Styria, of Carinthia and of Carniola; Grand Princess of Transylvania; Margravine of Moravia; Duchess of Brabant, of Limburg, of Luxemburg, of Guelders, of Württemberg, of Upper and Lower Silesia, of Milan, of Mantua, of Parma, of Piacenza, of Guastalla, of Auschwitz, of Zator; Princess of Swabia; Princely Countess of Habsburg, of Flanders, of Tyrol, of Hainault, of Kyburg, of Gorizia and of Gradisca; Margravine of Burgau, of Upper and Lower Lusatia; Countess of Namur; Lady of the Wendish Mark and of Mechlin; Dowager Duchess of Lorraine and Bar, Dowager Grand Duchess of Tuscany, etc." (Note: In German: Maria Theresia von Gottes Gnaden Heilige Römische Kaiserinwitwe, Königin zu Ungarn, Böhmen, Dalmatien, Kroatien, Slavonien, Gallizien, Lodomerien, usw., Erzherzogin zu Österreich, Herzogin zu Burgund, zu Steyer, zu Kärnten und zu Crain, Großfürstin zu Siebenbürgen, Markgräfin zu Mähren, Herzogin zu Braband, zu Limburg, zu Luxemburg und zu Geldern, zu Württemberg, zu Ober- und Nieder-Schlesien, zu Milan, zu Mantua, zu Parma, zu Piacenza, zu Guastala, zu Auschwitz und Zator, Fürstin zu Schwaben, gefürstete Gräfin zu Habsburg, zu Flandern, zu Tirol, zu Hennegau, zu Kyburg, zu Görz und zu Gradisca, Markgräfin des Heiligen Römischen Reiches, zu Burgau, zu Ober- und Nieder-Lausitz, Gräfin zu Namur, Frau auf der Windischen Mark und zu Mecheln, Herzoginwitwe zu Lothringen und Baar, Großherzoginwitwe zu Toskana)

=== Coat of Arms ===
Coat of arms (shield)	Coat of arms (shield with supporters)	Greater Coat of Arms

== Issue ==
No.	Name	Portrait	Birth	Death	Notes
1	Archduchess Maria Elisabeth of Austria		5 February 1737	7 June 1740 (aged 3)	died in childhood, no issue
2	Archduchess Maria Anna		6 October 1738	19 November 1789 (aged 51)	died unmarried, no issue
3	Archduchess Maria Carolina of Austria		12 January 1740	25 January 1741 (aged 1)	died in childhood likely from smallpox, no issue
4	Holy Roman Emperor Joseph II		13 March 1741	20 February 1790 (aged 48)	married 1) Princess Isabella Maria of Parma (1741–1763), married 2) Princess Marie Josepha of Bavaria (1739–1767) – second cousin, had issue from his first marriage (two daughters, who died young)
5	Archduchess Maria Christina of Austria		13 May 1742	24 June 1798 (aged 56)	married Prince Albert of Saxony, Duke of Teschen (1738–1822), her second cousin, had issue (one stillborn daughter)
6	Archduchess Maria Elisabeth of Austria		13 August 1743	22 September 1808 (aged 65)	died unmarried, no issue
7	Archduke Charles Joseph of Austria		1 February 1745	18 January 1761 (aged 15)	died of smallpox, no issue
8	Archduchess Maria Amalia of Austria		26 February 1746	18 June 1806 (aged 58)	married Ferdinand, Duke of Parma (1751–1802), had issue.
9	Holy Roman Emperor Leopold II		5 May 1747	1 March 1792 (aged 44)	married Infanta Maria Luisa of Spain (1745–1792), had issue. Grand Duke of Tuscany from 1765 (abdicated 1790), Holy Roman Emperor from 1790, Archduke of Austria, King of Hungary and King of Bohemia from 1790.
10	Archduchess Maria Carolina of Austria		17 September 1748	17 September 1748 (aged 0)	died during birth.
11	Archduchess Maria Johanna Gabriela of Austria		4 February 1750	23 December 1762 (aged 12)	died of smallpox, no issue
12	Archduchess Maria Josepha of Austria		19 March 1751	15 October 1767 (aged 16)	died of smallpox, no issue
13	Archduchess Maria Carolina of Austria		13 August 1752	7 September 1814 (aged 62)	married King Ferdinand IV of Naples and Sicily (1751–1825); had issue
14	Archduke Ferdinand of Austria		1 June 1754	24 December 1806 (aged 52)	married Maria Beatrice d'Este, Duchess of Massa, heiress of Breisgau and of Modena, had issue (Austria-Este). Duke of Breisgau from 1803.
15	Archduchess Maria Antonia of Austria		2 November 1755	16 October 1793 (aged 37)	married Louis XVI of France and Navarre (1754–1793) and became Marie Antoinette, Queen of France and Navarre. Had children but no grandchildren. Executed by guillotine.
16	Archduke Maximilian Franz of Austria		8 December 1756	27 July 1801 (aged 44)	Archbishop-Elector of Cologne, 1784. Died unmarried, no issue.

== Ancestry ==
Ancestors of Maria Theresa

8. Ferdinand III, Holy Roman Emperor
4. Leopold I, Holy Roman Emperor
9. Maria Anna of Austria
2. Charles VI, Holy Roman Emperor
10. Philip William, Elector Palatine
5. Eleonore Magdalene of Neuburg
11. Elisabeth Amalie of Hesse-Darmstadt
1. Maria Theresa of Austria
12. Anthony Ulrich, Duke of Brunswick-Wolfenbüttel
6. Louis Rudolph, Duke of Brunswick-Wolfenbüttel
13. Elisabeth Juliane of Schleswig-Holstein-Sonderburg-Norburg
3. Elisabeth Christine of Brunswick-Wolfenbüttel
14. Albert Ernest I, Prince of Oettingen-Oettingen
7. Christine Louise of Oettingen-Oettingen
15. Christine Friederike of Württemberg

== See also ==
- Kings of Bohemia family tree
- Kings of Hungary family tree

Maria Theresa House of Habsburg Born: 13 May 1717 Died: 29 November 1780
Regnal titles
Preceded by Emperor Charles VI	Queen of Bohemia; 1740–1741	Succeeded by Emperor Charles VII
Preceded by Emperor Charles VI	Duchess of Parma and Piacenza; 1740–1748	Succeeded by Philip of Spain
Preceded by Emperor Charles VI	Queen of Hungary, Croatia and Slavonia; Archduchess of Austria; Duchess of Brabant, Limburg, Lothier, Luxembourg and Milan; Countess of Flanders, Hainaut and Namur; 1740–1780 with Francis I (1740–1765); Joseph II (1765–1780)	Succeeded by Emperor Joseph II
Preceded by Emperor Charles VII	Queen of Bohemia; 1743–1780 with Francis I (1743–1765); Joseph II (1765–1780)	Succeeded by Emperor Joseph II
New title First Partition of Poland	Queen of Galicia and Lodomeria; 1772–1780	Succeeded by Emperor Joseph II
German royalty
Vacant Title last held by Maria Amalia of Austria	Empress consort of the Holy Roman Empire; 1745–1765	Succeeded by Maria Josepha of Bavaria
French royalty
Vacant Title last held by Élisabeth Charlotte d'Orléans	Duchess consort of Lorraine and Bar; 1736–1737	Succeeded by Catherine Opalińska
Italian royalty
Preceded by Anna Maria Franziska of Saxe-Lauenburg	Grand Duchess consort of Tuscany; 1737–1765	Succeeded by Maria Luisa of Spain
