= Surplice fees =

Surplice fees were, in English ecclesiastical law, the fees paid to the incumbent of a parish for rites such as baptisms, weddings, and funerals. They were paid to the incumbent, whoever performed the service.
