= List of heirs to the Austrian throne =

This is a list of people who were heir apparent or heir presumptive to the Archduchy of Austria from its elevation in 1453 to the end of the monarchy in Austria-Hungary in 1918. Those heirs who succeeded are shown in bold.

The position of heir to the Empire was often of great importance. More than once a younger brother of the emperor was persuaded to renounce his succession rights in his son's favour to provide a young male heir to the throne. The apparent suicide of the Crown Prince in 1889 and the assassination of the subsequent heir in 1914 (considered one of the great causes of World War I) led to instability in the monarchy, perhaps contributing to its abolition at the end of the War in 1918.

== Heirs to the Austrian Archduchy ==
| Archduke | Heir | Relationship to archduke and status | Became heir | Ceased to be heir | Next in line |
|---|---|---|---|---|---|
| Maximilian I | Archduke Philipp | Son; Heir apparent | August 19, 1493; father succeeded | September 25, 1506; died | Archduke Siegmund; 1st cousin -2, 1493-1496 |
| Maximilian I | Archduke Philipp | Son; Heir apparent | August 19, 1493; father succeeded | September 25, 1506; died | none, 1496-1500 |
| Maximilian I | Archduke Philipp | Son; Heir apparent | August 19, 1493; father succeeded | September 25, 1506; died | **Archduke Karl** son, 1500-1506 |
| Maximilian I | **Archduke Karl** | Grandson; Heir apparent | September 25, 1506; father died | January 12, 1519; succession | **Archduke Ferdinand** brother |
| Karl I | **Archduke Ferdinand** | Brother; Heir presumptive | January 12, 1519; brother succeeded | April 28, 1521; succession | none |
| Ferdinand I | none, 1521-1527 | | | | |
| Ferdinand I | **Archduke Maximilian** | Son; Heir apparent | July 31, 1527; born | July 25, 1564; succession | none, 1527-1529 |
| Ferdinand I | **Archduke Maximilian** | Son; Heir apparent | July 31, 1527; born | July 25, 1564; succession | Archduke Ferdinand brother, 1529-1551 |
| Ferdinand I | **Archduke Maximilian** | Son; Heir apparent | July 31, 1527; born | July 25, 1564; succession | Archduke Ferdinand son, 1551-1552 |
| Ferdinand I | **Archduke Maximilian** | Son; Heir apparent | July 31, 1527; born | July 25, 1564; succession | Archduke Ferdinand brother, 1552 |
| Ferdinand I | **Archduke Maximilian** | Son; Heir apparent | July 31, 1527; born | July 25, 1564; succession | **Archduke Rudolf** son, 1552-1564 |
| Maximilian II | **Archduke Rudolf** | Son; Heir apparent | July 25, 1564; father succeeded | October 12, 1576; succession | Archduke Ernst brother |
| Rudolf V | Archduke Ernst | Brother; Heir presumptive | October 12, 1576; brother succeeded | February 20, 1595; died | **Archduke Matthias** brother |
| Rudolf V | **Archduke Matthias** | Brother; Heir presumptive | February 20, 1595; brother died | June 25, 1608; succeeded | Archduke Maximilian brother |
| Matthias I | Archduke Maximilian | Brother; Heir presumptive | June 25, 1608; brother succeeded | November 2, 1618; died | **Archduke Albert** brother |
| Matthias I | **Archduke Albert** | Brother; Heir presumptive | November 2, 1618; brother died | March 20, 1619; succeeded | **Archduke Ferdinand**; 1st cousin |
| Albert VII | **Archduke Ferdinand** | 1st cousin Heir presumptive | March 20, 1619; cousin succeeded | October 9, 1619; succeeded | **Archduke Ferdinand** son |
| Ferdinand III | **Archduke Ferdinand** | Son; Heir apparent | October 9, 1619; father succeeded | February 15, 1637; succeeded | Archduke Leopold Wilhelm; 1619-1633, brother |
| Ferdinand III | **Archduke Ferdinand** | Son; Heir apparent | October 9, 1619; father succeeded | February 15, 1637; succeeded | Archduke Ferdinand; 1633-1637, son |
| Ferdinand IV | Archduke Ferdinand | Son; Heir apparent | February 15, 1637; father succeeded | July 9, 1654; died | Archduke Leopold Wilhelm; 1637, uncle |
| Ferdinand IV | Archduke Ferdinand | Son; Heir apparent | February 15, 1637; father succeeded | July 9, 1654; died | Archduke Philipp August; 1637-1639, brother |
| Ferdinand IV | Archduke Ferdinand | Son; Heir apparent | February 15, 1637; father succeeded | July 9, 1654; died | Archduke Maximilian Thomas; 1639, brother |
| Ferdinand IV | Archduke Ferdinand | Son; Heir apparent | February 15, 1637; father succeeded | July 9, 1654; died | Archduke Leopold Wilhelm; 1639-1640, uncle |
| Ferdinand IV | Archduke Ferdinand | Son; Heir apparent | February 15, 1637; father succeeded | July 9, 1654; died | **Archduke Leopold**; 1640-1654, brother |
| Ferdinand IV | **Archduke Leopold** | Son; Heir apparent | July 9, 1654; brother died | April 2, 1657; succeeded | Archduke Charles Joseph brother |
| Leopold VI | Archduke Charles Joseph | Brother; Heir presumptive | April 2, 1657; brother succeeded | January 27, 1664; died | Archduke Leopold Wilhelm; 1657-1662, uncle |
| Leopold VI | Archduke Charles Joseph | Brother; Heir presumptive | April 2, 1657; brother succeeded | January 27, 1664; died | Archduke Ferdinand Charles; 1662, 1st cousin -1 |
| Leopold VI | Archduke Charles Joseph | Brother; Heir presumptive | April 2, 1657; brother succeeded | January 27, 1664; died | Archduke Sigismund Francis; 1662-1664, 1st cousin -1 |
| Leopold VI | Archduke Sigismund Francis | 1st cousin -1; Heir presumptive | January 27, 1664; cousin died | June 25, 1665; died | none |
| Leopold VI | none, 1665-1667 | | | | |
| Leopold VI | Archduke Ferdinand Wenzel | Son; Heir apparent | 28 September 1667; born | 13 January 1668; died | none |
| Leopold VI | none, 1668-1670 | | | | |
| Leopold VI | Archduke Johann Leopold | Son; Heir apparent | 20 February 1670; born and died | | none |
| Leopold VI | none, 1670-1678 | | | | |
| Leopold VI | **Archduke Joseph** | Son; Heir apparent | 26 July 1678; born | 5 May 1705; succeeded | none, 1678-1684 |
| Leopold VI | **Archduke Joseph** | Son; Heir apparent | 26 July 1678; born | 5 May 1705; succeeded | Archduke Leopold Joseph; 1682-1684, brother |
| Leopold VI | **Archduke Joseph** | Son; Heir apparent | 26 July 1678; born | 5 May 1705; succeeded | none, 1684-1685 |
| Leopold VI | **Archduke Joseph** | Son; Heir apparent | 26 July 1678; born | 5 May 1705; succeeded | **Archduke Charles**; 1685-1700, brother |
| Leopold VI | **Archduke Joseph** | Son; Heir apparent | 26 July 1678; born | 5 May 1705; succeeded | Archduke Leopold Joseph; 1700-1701, son |
| Leopold VI | **Archduke Joseph** | Son; Heir apparent | 26 July 1678; born | 5 May 1705; succeeded | **Archduke Charles**; 1701-1705, brother |
| Joseph I | **Archduke Charles** | Brother; Heir presumptive | 5 May 1705; brother succeeded | 17 April 1711; succeeded | none |
| Charles III | none, 1711-1713 | | | | |
| Charles III | Archduchess Maria Josepha | Niece; Heir presumptive | 19 April 1713; Pragmatic Sanction of 1713 | 13 April 1716; son born to Archduke | Archduchess Maria Amalia sister |
| Charles III | Archduke Leopold Johann | Son; Heir apparent | 13 April 1716; born | 4 November 1716; died | Archduchess Maria Josepha cousin |
| Charles III | Archduchess Maria Josepha | Niece; Heir presumptive | 4 November 1716; cousin died | 13 May 1717; daughter born to Archduke | Archduchess Maria Amalia sister |
| Charles III | **Archduchess Maria Theresa** | Daughter; Heir presumptive | 13 May 1717; born | 20 October 1740; succeeded | Archduchess Maria Josepha; 1717–1718, cousin |
| Charles III | **Archduchess Maria Theresa** | Daughter; Heir presumptive | 13 May 1717; born | 20 October 1740; succeeded | Archduchess Maria Anna; 1718–1737, sister |
| Charles III | **Archduchess Maria Theresa** | Daughter; Heir presumptive | 13 May 1717; born | 20 October 1740; succeeded | Archduchess Maria Elisabeth; 1737–1740, daughter |
| Charles III | **Archduchess Maria Theresa** | Daughter; Heir presumptive | 13 May 1717; born | 20 October 1740; succeeded | Archduchess Maria Anna; 1740, daughter |
| Maria Theresa and Francis I | Archduchess Maria Anna | Daughter; Heir presumptive | 20 October 1740; mother succeeded | 13 March 1741; son born to Archduchess | Archduchess Maria Carolina; 1740–1741, sister |
| Maria Theresa and Francis I | Archduchess Maria Anna | Daughter; Heir presumptive | 20 October 1740; mother succeeded | 13 March 1741; son born to Archduchess | Archduchess Maria Anna; 1741, aunt |
| Maria Theresa and Francis I | **Archduke Joseph** | Son; Heir apparent | 13 March 1741; born | 18 August 1765; succeeded | Archduchess Maria Anna; 1741–1745, sister |
| Maria Theresa and Francis I | **Archduke Joseph** | Son; Heir apparent | 13 March 1741; born | 18 August 1765; succeeded | Archduke Charles Joseph; 1745–1761, brother |
| Maria Theresa and Francis I | **Archduke Joseph** | Son; Heir apparent | 13 March 1741; born | 18 August 1765; succeeded | **Archduke Leopold**; 1761–1765, brother |
| Maria Theresa and Joseph II | **Pietro Leopoldo I of Tuscany** | Son and Brother; Heir presumptive | 18 August 1765; brother succeeded | 20 February 1790; succeeded | Archduke Ferdinand; 1765–1768, brother |
| Joseph II | **Pietro Leopoldo I of Tuscany** | Son and Brother; Heir presumptive | 18 August 1765; brother succeeded | 20 February 1790; succeeded | **Archduke Francis**; 1768–1790, son |
| Leopold VII | **Archduke Francis** | Son; Heir apparent | 20 February 1790; father succeeded | 1 March 1792; succeeded | Ferdinando III of Tuscany brother |
| Francis II | Ferdinando III of Tuscany | Brother; Heir presumptive | 1 March 1792; brother succeeded | 19 April 1793; son born to Archduke | Archduke Charles brother |
| Francis II | **Archduke Ferdinand** | Son; Heir apparent | 19 April 1793; born | 11 August 1804; Archduchy replaced by Empire | Ferdinando III of Tuscany; 1793–1799, uncle |
| Francis II | **Archduke Ferdinand** | Son; Heir apparent | 19 April 1793; born | 11 August 1804; Archduchy replaced by Empire | Archduke Joseph Franz; 1799–1804, brother |

== Heirs to the Austrian Empire ==
| Heir | Status | Relationship to monarch | Became heir | | Ceased to be heir | | Duration as heir | Next in succession Relation to heir | Monarch |
| Heir | Status | Relationship to monarch | Date | Reason | Date | Reason | Duration as heir | Next in succession Relation to heir | Monarch |
|---|---|---|---|---|---|---|---|---|---|
| Crown Prince Ferdinand | Heir apparent | Eldest son | 11 August 1804 | Father proclaimed emperor of Austria | 2 March 1835 | Became emperor | 30 years, 6 months and 19 days | Archduke Joseph Franz; 1804–1807; Younger brother | Franz I |
| Crown Prince Ferdinand | Heir apparent | Eldest son | 11 August 1804 | Father proclaimed emperor of Austria | 2 March 1835 | Became emperor | 30 years, 6 months and 19 days | Archduke Franz Karl; 1807–1835; Younger brother | Franz I |
| Archduke Franz Karl | Heir presumptive | Younger brother | 2 March 1835 | Brother became emperor without children | 2 December 1848 | Renounced his own claim to the throne when his brother abdicated | 13 years and 9 months | Archduke Franz Joseph; Eldest son | Ferdinand I |
| Archduke Ferdinand Maximilian | Heir presumptive | Younger brother | 2 December 1848 | Brother became emperor without children | 21 August 1858 | Supplanted: son born to emperor | 9 years, 8 months and 19 days | Archduke Karl Ludwig; Younger brother | Franz Joseph I |
| Crown Prince Rudolf | Heir apparent | Eldest son | 21 August 1858 | Born | 30 January 1889 | Committed suicide (Gunshot wound) | 30 years, 5 months and 9 days | Archduke Ferdinand Maximilian; 1858–1864; Uncle | Franz Joseph I |
| Crown Prince Rudolf | Heir apparent | Eldest son | 21 August 1858 | Born | 30 January 1889 | Committed suicide (Gunshot wound) | 30 years, 5 months and 9 days | Archduke Karl Ludwig; 1864–1889; Uncle | Franz Joseph I |
| Archduke Karl Ludwig | Heir presumptive | Younger brother | 30 January 1889 | Nephew committed suicide | 19 May 1896 | Died | 7 years, 3 months and 19 days | Archduke Franz Ferdinand; Son | Franz Joseph I |
| Archduke Franz Ferdinand | Heir presumptive | Nephew | 19 May 1896 | Father died | 28 June 1914 | Assassination (Gunshot wound) | 18 years, 1 month and 9 days | Archduke Otto Franz Joseph; 1896–1906; Brother | Franz Joseph I |
| Archduke Franz Ferdinand | Heir presumptive | Nephew | 19 May 1896 | Father died | 28 June 1914 | Assassination (Gunshot wound) | 18 years, 1 month and 9 days | Archduke Karl; 1906–1914; Nephew | Franz Joseph I |
| Archduke Karl | Heir presumptive | Grandnephew | 28 June 1914 | Uncle was assassinated | 21 November 1916 | Became emperor | 2 years, 4 months and 24 days | Archduke Otto; Son | Franz Joseph I |
| Crown Prince Otto | Heir apparent | Eldest son | 21 November 1916 | Father became emperor | 12 November 1918 | Monarchy abolished | 1 year, 11 months and 22 days | Archduke Robert; Brother | Karl I |
