= Maria Carolina =

Maria Carolina or Marie Caroline may refer to:

== Royalty ==
- Maria Karolina Sobieska (1697–1740), Princess of Turenne and Duchess of Bouillon
- Archduchess Maria Carolina of Austria (born 1740) (1740–1741), daughter of Empress Maria Theresa and Emperor Francis I
- Archduchess Maria Carolina of Austria (stillborn 1748), daughter of Empress Maria Theresa and Emperor Francis I
- Maria Carolina of Austria (1752–1814), Queen of Naples and Sicily from 1768 to 1814, daughter of Empress Maria Theresa and Emperor Francis I
- Princess Maria Carolina of Savoy (1764–1782), Electoral Princess of Saxony
- Maria Caroline Gibert de Lametz (1793–1879), Princess of Monaco
- Marie-Caroline of Bourbon-Two Sicilies, Duchess of Berry (1798–1870), Duchess of Berry
- Archduchess Marie Caroline of Austria (1801–1832), Crown Princess of Saxony
- Princess Maria Carolina of Bourbon-Two Sicilies (1820–1861), Countess of Montemolin
- Princess Maria Carolina of Bourbon-Two Sicilies (1822–1869), Duchess of Aumale
- Archduchess Maria Karoline of Austria (1825–1915), granddaughter of Emperor Leopold II
- Princess Maria Carolina of Bourbon-Two Sicilies (1856–1941), Countess Maria Carolina Zamoyska
- Princess Maria Karoline of Saxe-Coburg and Gotha (1899–1941), daughter of Prince August Leopold of Saxe-Coburg and Gotha
- Princess Maria Carolina of Bourbon-Parma (born 1974), Marchioness of Sala
- Princess Marie-Caroline of Liechtenstein (born 1996), daughter of Alois, Hereditary Prince of Liechtenstein
- Princess Maria Carolina of Bourbon (born 2003), daughter of Prince Carlo, Duke of Castro

== Others ==
- Marie Caroline Bjelke-Petersen (1874–1969), Danish-Australian novelist
- Maria Veleda (Maria Carolina Frederico Crispin, 1871–1955), Portuguese educator, journalist and activist
- Maria Carolina Gomes Santiago (born 1985), Brazilian Paralympic swimmer
- Carolina Herrera (born 1939), born María Carolina Josefina Pacanins y Niño, Venezuelan fashion designer
- Marie-Caroline Le Pen (born 1960), daughter of Jean-Marie Le Pen
- Carolina Luján (María Carolina Luján, born 1985), Argentine chess player
- Marie Caroline Miolan-Carvalho (1827–1895), French soprano
- María Carolina Santa Cruz (born 1978), Argentine swimmer
- Maria Carolina Wolf (1742–1820), German pianist, singer and composer

== See also ==
- Carolina, Santa Maria in Rio Grande do Sul, Brazil
