= Toussaint =

Toussaint (French for All Saints' Day, literally: "All Saints") may refer to:

- Toussaint (name)
- Toussaint, Seine-Maritime, a commune in the arrondissement of Le Havre in the Seine-Maritime département of France
- Toussaint hierarchy, a mathematical hierarchy of graphs devised by Godfried Toussaint
  - Akl–Toussaint heuristic, part of the Toussaint hierarchy
- Toussaint (film), a 2009 film about Haitian liberator Toussaint Louverture
- Toussaint (album), a 1971 album by Allen Toussaint
- Toussaint Coffee Liqueur, a coffee-flavoured liqueur named after the Haitian revolutionary hero Toussaint Louverture
- Toussaint, an opera by David Blake
- Toussaint, a fictional duchy from The Witcher franchise
- T'Challa II, also known as Toussaint, the son of T'Challa / Black Panther and Nakia in the Marvel Cinematic Universe film Black Panther: Wakanda Forever

== See also ==
- All Saints (disambiguation)
- Toussaint Louverture (disambiguation)
