= Overture (disambiguation) =

An overture is the instrumental introduction to a dramatic, choral or, occasionally, instrumental composition.

Overture may also refer to:

== Companies ==
- Overture Networks, multi-national manufacturer of networking and telecommunications equipment
- Overture Films, theatrical motion picture production & distribution company
- Overture Services, an Internet search engine company acquired by Yahoo! in 2003
- Overture Maps Foundation, an open data mapping collaboration, launched in mid-December 2022 under the auspices of the Linux Foundation

== Film and television ==
- Overture (1958 film), a 1958 Canadian documentary film
- Overture (1965 film), a 1965 Hungarian documentary film
- The Overture, a 2004 Thai musical-drama film
- "Overture" (Hazbin Hotel), the 2024 series premiere of Hazbin Hotel

== Music ==
- "Overture" (Def Leppard song), the last track on Def Leppard's debut album On Through The Night (1980)
- "Overture" (The Who song), a song by The Who from the 1969 rock opera Tommy
- "Overture 1928", the second track from Dream Theater's fifth studio album, Metropolis Pt. 2: Scenes From A Memory
- "Overture" (Bruckner), an orchestral composition by Anton Bruckner
- "Overture", a 2015 song by AJR from Living Room
- "Overture", a 2017 song by AJR from The Click
- "Overture", a 2023 song by Kamelot from The Awakening
- "Overture", a 2010 song by Martin O'Donnell on the soundtrack of Halo: Reach
- "Overture", a 2007 song by Patrick Wolf from The Magic Position
- "Overture", a song from Irving Berlin's musical Annie Get Your Gun, starring Dolores Gray as Annie Oakley
- "Overture", the instrumental introduction of Rush's song "2112" from the album of the same name, released in 1976

== Other uses ==
- Overture (novel), a 2018 novel by Zlatko Topčić
- Overture (video game), a 2015 action-adventure game
- Overture Center, a performing arts center and art gallery in Madison, Wisconsin
- Penumbra: Overture, a survival horror PC video game, the first installment of the Penumbra series by Frictional Games
- Overture (software), notation software developed by Sonic Scores
- Boom Overture, a supersonic jet airliner expected to be introduced around 2029

== See also ==
- Ouverture (disambiguation)
- Toussaint Louverture (disambiguation)
