= Toussaint (name) =

Toussaint is both a French surname and a masculine French given name. Notable people with the name include:

== Given name ==
- Toussaint (leper chief) (c. 1890–unknown), chief of a leper colony in South America
- Toussaint Charbonneau (1767–1843), French-Canadian explorer and trader, member of the Lewis and Clark Expedition, best known as the husband of Sacagawea
- Toussaint de Charpentier (1779–1847), German geologist and entomologist
- Toussaint Dallam (1659-unknown), French organ-builder
- Toussaint Dubreuil (c. 1560–1602), French painter associated with the second School of Fontainebleau
- Toussaint-Bernard Émeric-David (1755–1839), French archaeologist and writer on art
- Toussaint Hočevar (1927–1987), Slovenian-American economic historian
- Toussaint-Antoine-Rodolphe Laflamme (1827–1893), French-Canadian lawyer, professor of law and politician
- Toussaint Louverture (1743–1803), freed black slave and former French general who led the Haitian Revolution expelling the French, British, and Spanish armies that enforced slavery in Haiti and nearby Santo Domingo
- Toussaint McCall (1934–2023), American R&B singer and organist
- Toussaint Natama (1982–2024), Burkinabé football player

== Middle name ==
- Oliver Toussaint Jackson (1862–1948), American businessman

== Surname ==
- Allen Toussaint (1938–2015), American musician, songwriter and record producer
- André Toussaint, Haitian singer and guitarist
- Auguste Toussaint (1911–1990s), Mauritian archivist and historian
- Beth Toussaint (born 1962), American actress, best known for her television performances
- Carlos Toussaint (1901–1975), Mexican film director
- Cheryl Toussaint (born 1952), American athlete who mainly competed in the 800 metres
- Dany Toussaint (1957–2021), candidate in the 2006 Haitian presidential election
- Godfried Toussaint, Belgian, British, and Canadian professor of computer science specializing in computational geometry and computational music
- Eugenio Toussaint (1954–2011), Mexican composer
- Fitzgerald Toussaint, American football player
- François-Vincent Toussaint (1715–1772), author of Les Mœurs ("The Manners") published in 1748 and immediately prosecuted and burned by the French court of justice
- Franz Joseph Toussaint, Minister of Finance to Empress Maria Theresa
- Jean Toussaint (born 1960), American-British jazz saxophonist
- Jean Joseph Henri Toussaint (1847–1890), French veterinarian and bacteriologist
- Jean-Philippe Toussaint (born 1957), Belgian writer
- Kira Toussaint, Dutch swimmer
- Kimani Toussaint, American professor and academic
- Lorraine Toussaint (born 1960), television actress best known for playing assistant medical examiner Elaine Duchamps on the television drama Crossing Jordan
- Marie Toussaint (born 1987), French politician
- Mauricio Toussaint (born 1960), contemporary Mexican artist
- Michel'le Toussaint, an American R&B singer-songwriter
- Naika Toussaint (born 1988), Canadian actress
- Nina Toussaint-White (born 1985), British actress
- Olivier Toussaint, French composer, pop singer, orchestra arranger, company manager, and record producer active since 1968
- Pierre Toussaint, Haitian-American philanthropist
- Randolph Toussaint (born 1955), Guyanese cyclist
- Roger Toussaint (born 1956), former president of Transport Workers Union (TWU) Local 100 and announced the 2005 New York City transit strike
- Rose Marie Toussaint, Haitian-American transplant surgeon
- Rudolf Toussaint, the German Army commander in Prague at the end of World War II, imprisoned for life for war crimes
- Touki Toussaint, American baseball player
