= Archduchess Maria Carolina of Austria (stillborn 1748) =

Stillborn daughter of Maria Theresa

Maria Carolina of Austria
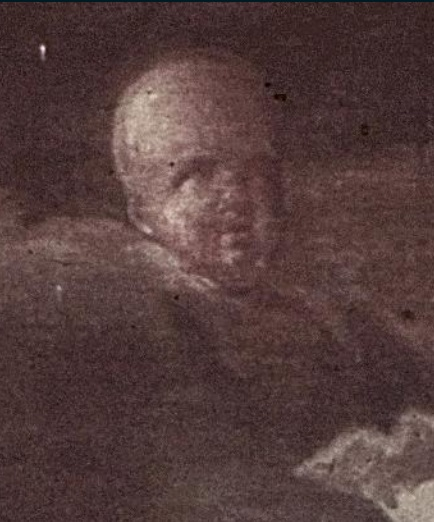
- Extract from a mural by Franz Anton Maulbertsch in the Hofburg (Innsbruck), representing the four daughters of Maria Theresa who died in childhood
- Born: 17 September 1748; Schönbrunn Palace, Vienna, Archduchy of Austria, Holy Roman Empire
- Died: 17 September 1748 (aged 0); Schönbrunn Palace, Vienna, Archduchy of Austria, Holy Roman Empire
- Burial: Imperial Crypt, Vienna
- House: Habsburg-Lorraine
- Father: Francis I, Holy Roman Emperor
- Mother: Maria Theresa

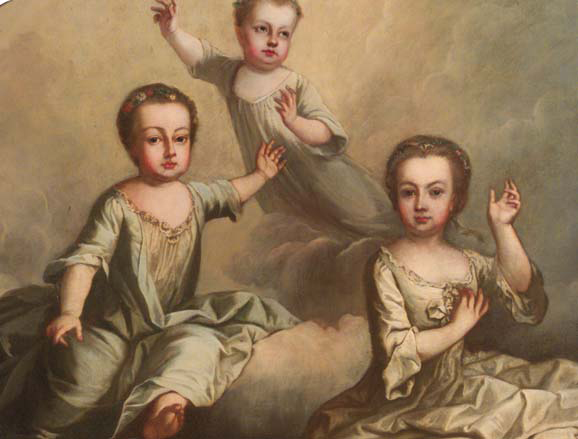
Three floating children (by Martin van Meytens, 1748). Van Meytens was commissioned in 1748 by Empress Maria Theresa to produce a posthumous painting of her three daughters who had died in infancy. From left to right: Maria Carolina (1740–1741), Maria Carolina (1748) and Maria Elisabeth (1737–1740)

Archduchess Maria Carolina of Austria (born and died 17 September 1748) was the tenth child and the seventh daughter of Empress Maria Theresa and Francis I, Holy Roman Emperor.

== Biography ==
Maria Carolina was the second of the children of Maria Theresa to bear the name: her elder sister with the same name had died in 1741 at the age of one year old. The second Maria Carolina also died in infancy. Particularly traumatic was that she died during the birth, necessitating an emergency baptism. The baby failed to turn in the womb and so presented feet first for birth. As it became evident that the child would not survive, the surrounding women began weeping and the sacrament on the altar was hurriedly prepared for worship. It was considered of the utmost importance that the child would be baptized while still living, since according to traditional Catholic belief unbaptized infants would spend eternity in limbo. Maria Theresa's physician Gerard van Swieten assured her that the infant was still living when baptized, but many at court doubted this. The baby's body was placed in the Summer Room in Schönbrunn Palace (like other newborn children), so that the members of the court might assure themselves that she was a normal child and not malformed, but was not formally displayed. The baby was buried in the Imperial Crypt.

Maria Theresa continued to treasure the memory of her tenth child. In 1748, she commissioned the painter Martin van Meytens to paint the three daughters who had died in infancy. Maria Carolina appears in the center of the picture, flanked by her namesake and the eldest daughter Maria Elisabeth. After the sudden death in 1765 of Maria Theresa's husband Francis I, she commissioned from Franz Anton Maulbertsch a mural in the "Giant Hall" of the Hofburg in Innsbruck. The mural shows her four daughters who died in childhood, crowned with floral wreathes and sitting on clouds: in the foreground is Johanna Gabriele, who died in 1762 from smallpox at the age of twelve, behind her Maria Elisabeth (the firstborn) at the age of three years, then Maria Carolina, who died shortly after her first birthday, and in the far background, only visible as a shadowy putto (cherub), the second Maria Carolina, who did not live an hour.

The name Maria Carolina was given again in 1752 to Maria Theresa's thirteenth child. The third Maria Carolina of Austria became Queen of Naples and Sicily.

== Ancestry ==
Ancestors of Archduchess Maria Carolina of Austria (stillborn 1748)

8. Charles V, Duke of Lorraine
4. Leopold, Duke of Lorraine
9. Eleanor of Austria
2. Francis I, Holy Roman Emperor
10. Philippe I, Duke of Orléans
5. Élisabeth Charlotte d'Orléans
11. Elizabeth Charlotte of the Palatinate
1. Archduchess Maria Carolina of Austria
12. Leopold I, Holy Roman Emperor
6. Charles VI, Holy Roman Emperor
13. Eleonor Magdalene of Neuburg
3. Maria Theresa
14. Louis Rudolph, Duke of Brunswick-Wolfenbüttel
7. Elisabeth Christine of Brunswick
15. Christine Louise of Oettingen-Oettingen

== Bibliography ==
- Egghardt, Hanne (2010). Maria Theresias Kinder. 16 Schicksale zwischen Glanz und Elend. Vienna: Kremayr & Scheriau. ISBN 978-3-218-00813-6.
- Iby, Elfriede: "Marie-Thérèse, biographie d'une souveraine".
- Stollberg-Rilinger, Barbara (2017). Maria Theresia: Die Kaiserin in ihrer Zeit. Eine Biographie. Munich: C.H. Beck. ISBN 978-3-406-69748-7.
