= Archduchess Maria Elisabeth of Austria =

Archduchess Maria Elisabeth of Austria may refer to:

- Archduchess Maria Elisabeth of Austria (governor) (1680–1741)
- Archduchess Maria Elisabeth of Austria (1737–1740)
- Archduchess Maria Elisabeth of Austria (1743–1808)
