= Ouverture (disambiguation) =

An ouverture is an introductory movement to a larger musical work.

Ouverture, Ouvertüre, l'Ouverture, Louverture, or variation, may also refer to:

== People ==
- Toussaint Louverture (1743–1803), leader of the Haitian Revolution
- Suzanne Simone Baptiste Louverture (1742–1816), wife of Toussaint l'Ouverture
- Moyse Louveture (1733–1801; also called Moïse Hyacinthe L’Ouverture), Haitian Revolution military commander
- Donaldson Toussaint L'Ouverture Byrd II (1932–2013), U.S. jazz musician

== Places ==
- L'Ouverture International Airport, Port-au-Prince, Haiti
- Toussaint L'Ouverture County Cemetery, Franklin, Williamson County, Tennessee, USA
- L'Ouverture Hospital, Franklin and Armfield Office, Alexandra, Virginia, USA

== Arts and entertainment ==
- "Ouverture", a 2003 song by Daft Punk from Daft Club
- "Ouverture", a 2008 track by Within Temptation from Black Symphony
- Rozen Maiden: Ouvertüre, a Japanese anime cartoon TV show

== Other uses ==
- Louverture Films

== See also ==
- Overture (disambiguation)
- Toussaint Louverture (disambiguation)
