= Archduchess Maria Carolina of Austria (born 1740) =

Austrian archduchess (1740–1741)

Archduchess Maria Carolina
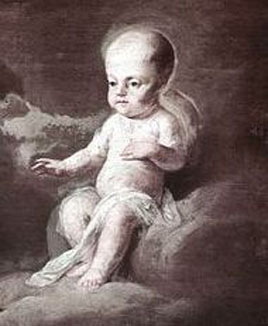
- Extract from a mural by Franz Anton Maulbertsch in the Hofburg (Innsbruck), representing the four daughters of Maria Theresa who died in childhood
- Born: 12 January 1740; Schönbrunn Palace, Vienna, Archduchy of Austria, Holy Roman Empire
- Died: 25 January 1741 (aged 1); Vienna, Archduchy of Austria, Holy Roman Empire
- Burial: Imperial Crypt
Names
- English: Mary Caroline Ernestine Antonia Joanne Josephine German: Maria Carolina Ernestina Antonia Johanna Josefa French: Marie Caroline Ernestine Antoinette Jeanne Josèphe
- House: Habsburg-Lorraine
- Father: Francis I, Holy Roman Emperor
- Mother: Maria Theresa

Archduchess Maria Carolina of Austria (Maria Carolina Ernestina Antonia Johanna Josefa; 12 January 1740 – 25 January 1741) was the third child and daughter of Empress Maria Theresa, and Francis I, Holy Roman Emperor.

== Biography ==
In Maria Theresa's third pregnancy, expectations for a male heir were intense. The disappointment was correspondingly great when, on 12 January 1740, a third daughter was born. She was immediately baptized on the evening of her birth.

After the death of her older sister Maria Elisabeth on 7 June, she became second in the line of succession, preceded only by her older sister Maria Anna. Five months later, on 20 October, her grandfather Emperor Charles VI died and her mother inherited the Austrian and Bohemian lands, and with this began the War of the Austrian Succession.

On 24 January 1741, the young Archduchess suddenly became gravely ill with violent seizures, dying around noon of the next day. The cause of death was believed to be either tetany or spasmophilia; however, at the time of her death an autopsy was carried out on the corpse, but no explanation was given for her demise. She was buried in the Maria Theresa Vault at the Imperial Crypt, Vienna.

Two other sisters were named after her: another short-lived one (born and died in 1748) and another (born in 1752), later Queen of Naples and Sicily.

== Ancestry ==
Ancestors of Archduchess Maria Carolina of Austria (born 1740)

8. Charles V, Duke of Lorraine
4. Leopold, Duke of Lorraine
9. Eleanor of Austria
2. Francis I, Holy Roman Emperor
10. Philippe I, Duke of Orléans
5. Élisabeth Charlotte d'Orléans
11. Elizabeth Charlotte of the Palatinate
1. Archduchess Marie Carolina of Austria
12. Leopold I, Holy Roman Emperor
6. Charles VI, Holy Roman Emperor
13. Eleonor Magdalene of Neuburg
3. Maria Theresa of Austria
14. Louis Rudolph, Duke of Brunswick-Wolfenbüttel
7. Elisabeth Christine of Brunswick
15. Christine Louise of Oettingen-Oettingen

== Bibliography ==
- Elfriede Iby: "Marie-Thérèse, biographie d'une souveraine".
