= Francis I, Holy Roman Emperor =

Holy Roman Emperor from 1745 to 1765

Francis I
- Imperator Romanorum
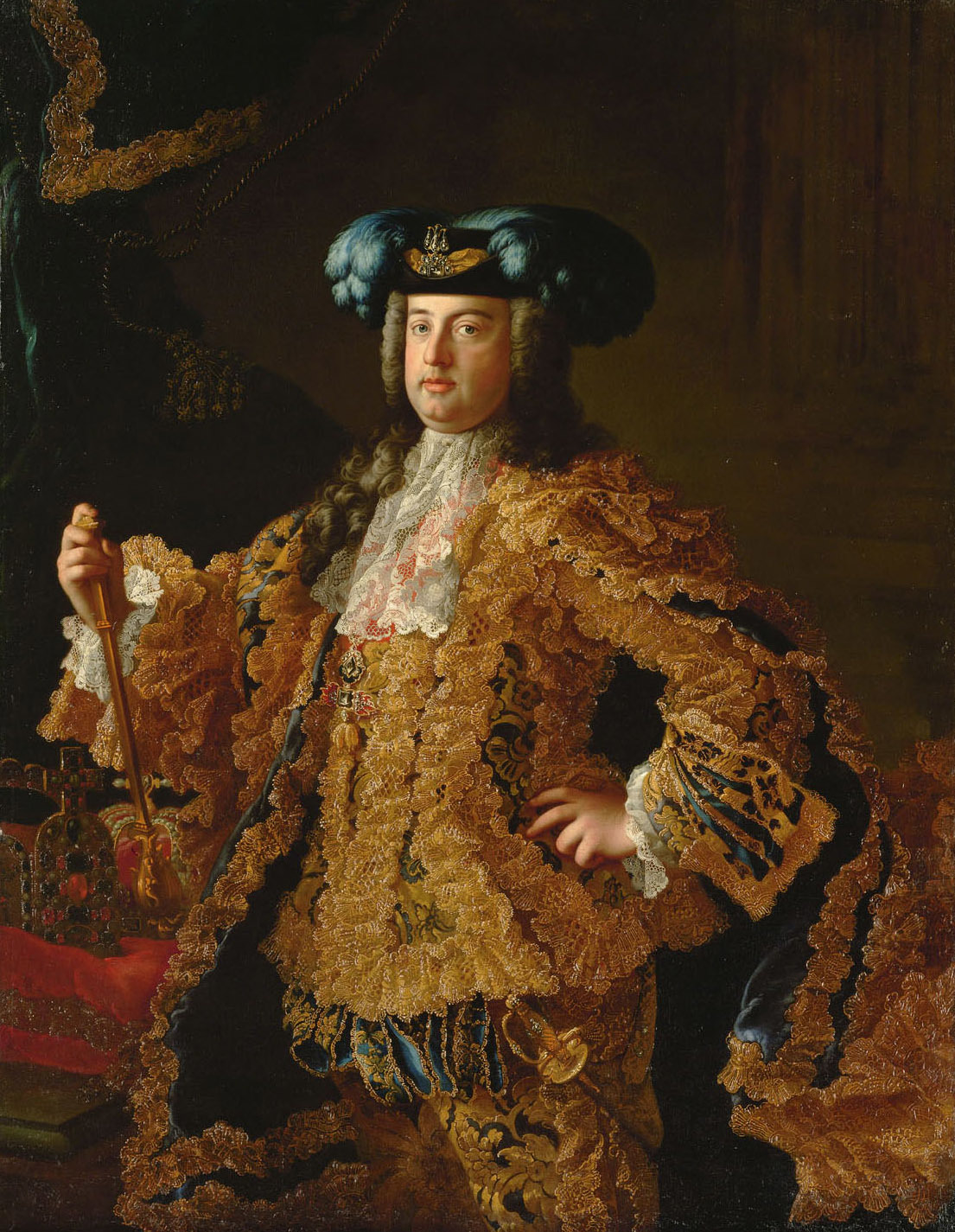
- Portrait by Martin van Meytens, c. 1745

Holy Roman Emperor
- Reign: 13 September 1745 – 18 August 1765
- Coronation: 4 October 1745; Frankfurt Cathedral
- Predecessor: Charles VII
- Successor: Joseph II

Archduke of Austria
- Reign: 20 October 1740 – 18 August 1765
- Predecessor: Charles III
- Successor: Joseph II
- Co-monarch: Maria Theresa

Grand Duke of Tuscany
- Reign: 12 July 1737 – 18 August 1765
- Predecessor: Gian Gastone
- Successor: Leopold I

Duke of Lorraine and Bar
- Reign: 27 March 1729 – 9 July 1737
- Predecessor: Leopold
- Successor: Stanislas

Duke of Teschen
- Reign: 27 March 1729 – 18 August 1765
- Predecessor: Leopold
- Successor: Joseph
- Born: Prince Francis Stephen of Lorraine; 8 December 1708; Lunéville, Duchy of Lorraine
- Died: 18 August 1765 (aged 56); Hofburg, Innsbruck, County of Tyrol
- Burial: Imperial Crypt
- Spouse: Maria Theresa of Austria (m. 1736)
- Issue: Archduchess Maria Elisabeth; Archduchess Maria Anna; Archduchess Maria Carolina; Joseph II, Holy Roman Emperor; Maria Christina, Duchess of Teschen; Archduchess Maria Elisabeth; Archduke Charles Joseph; Maria Amalia, Duchess of Parma; Leopold II, Holy Roman Emperor; Archduchess Maria Carolina; Archduchess Johanna Gabriele; Archduchess Maria Josepha; Maria Carolina, Queen of Naples and Sicily; Ferdinand Karl, Archduke of Austria-Este; Marie Antoinette, Queen of France; Maximilian Francis, Archbishop-Elector of Cologne
Names
- Francis Stephen
- House: Lorraine (by birth); Habsburg (by marriage); Habsburg-Lorraine (co-founder)
- Father: Leopold, Duke of Lorraine
- Mother: Élisabeth Charlotte d'Orléans
- Religion: Catholicism

Francis I (Francis Stephen; French: François Étienne; German: Franz Stefan; Italian: Francesco Stefano; 8 December 1708 – 18 August 1765) was Holy Roman Emperor from 1745 to 1765, Archduke of Austria from 1740 to 1765, Duke of Lorraine and Bar from 1729 to 1737, and Grand Duke of Tuscany from 1737 to 1765. He became the ruler of the Holy Roman Empire and Tuscany through his marriage to his second cousin Maria Theresa of Austria, daughter of Emperor Charles VI. Francis was the last non-Habsburg monarch of the Empire. The couple were the founders of the House of Habsburg-Lorraine and their marriage produced sixteen children.

Francis was the oldest surviving son of Leopold, Duke of Lorraine, and the French princess Élisabeth Charlotte d'Orléans. Duke Leopold died in 1729 and was succeeded by his son. In 1736, Francis married Maria Theresa. In 1738, he left the Duchy of Lorraine and Bar for the deposed Polish king Stanisław Leszczyński in exchange for the Grand Duchy of Tuscany, as one of the terms ending the War of the Polish Succession. Following the death of his father-in-law, Charles VI, in 1740, Francis and Maria Theresa became the rulers of the Habsburg domains. Maria Theresa gave her husband responsibility for the empire's financial affairs, which he handled well. Francis died in 1765 and was succeeded by their son, Joseph II, who co-ruled Austria alongside Maria Theresa.

== Early life ==
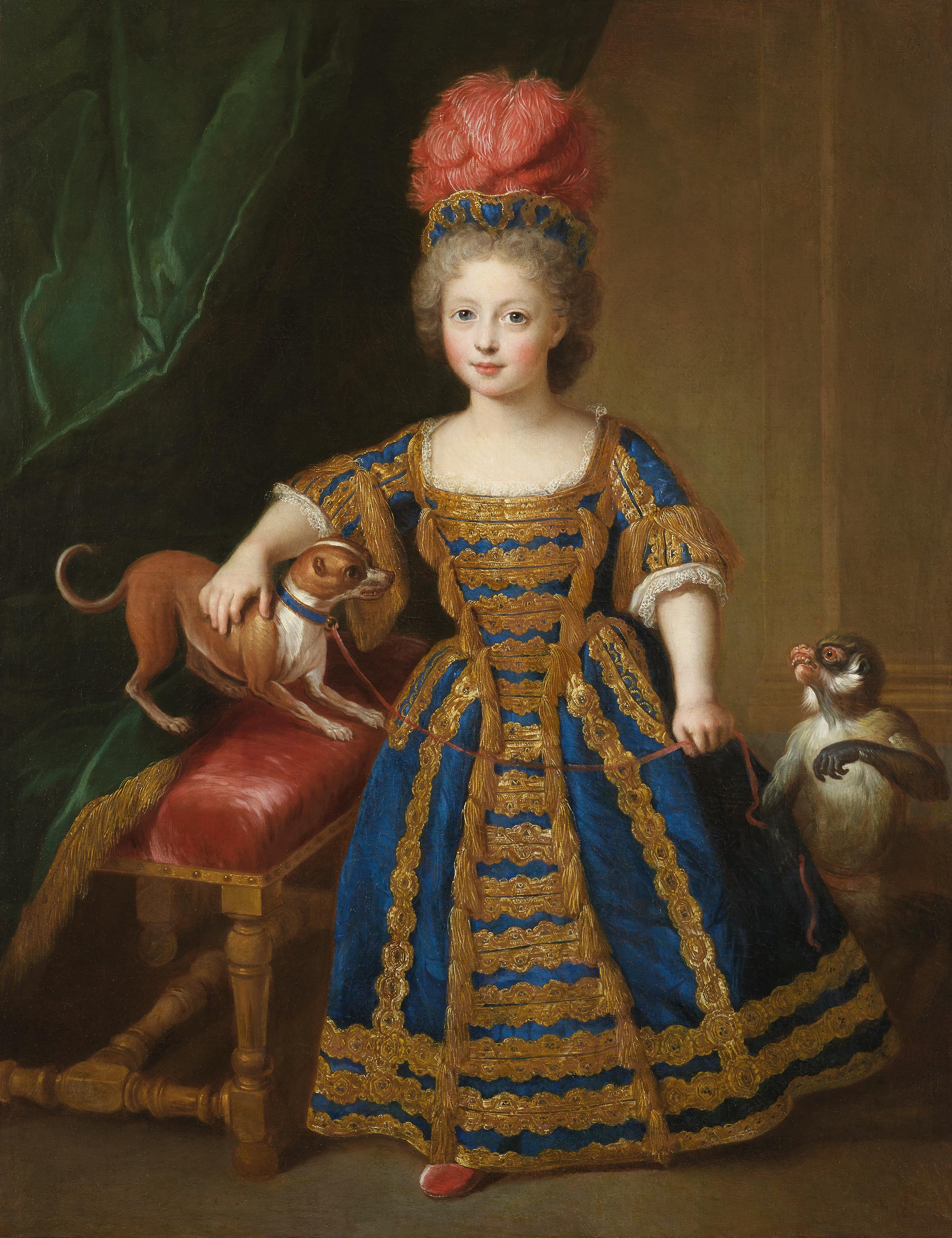
As a child c. 1712 by Pierre Gobert

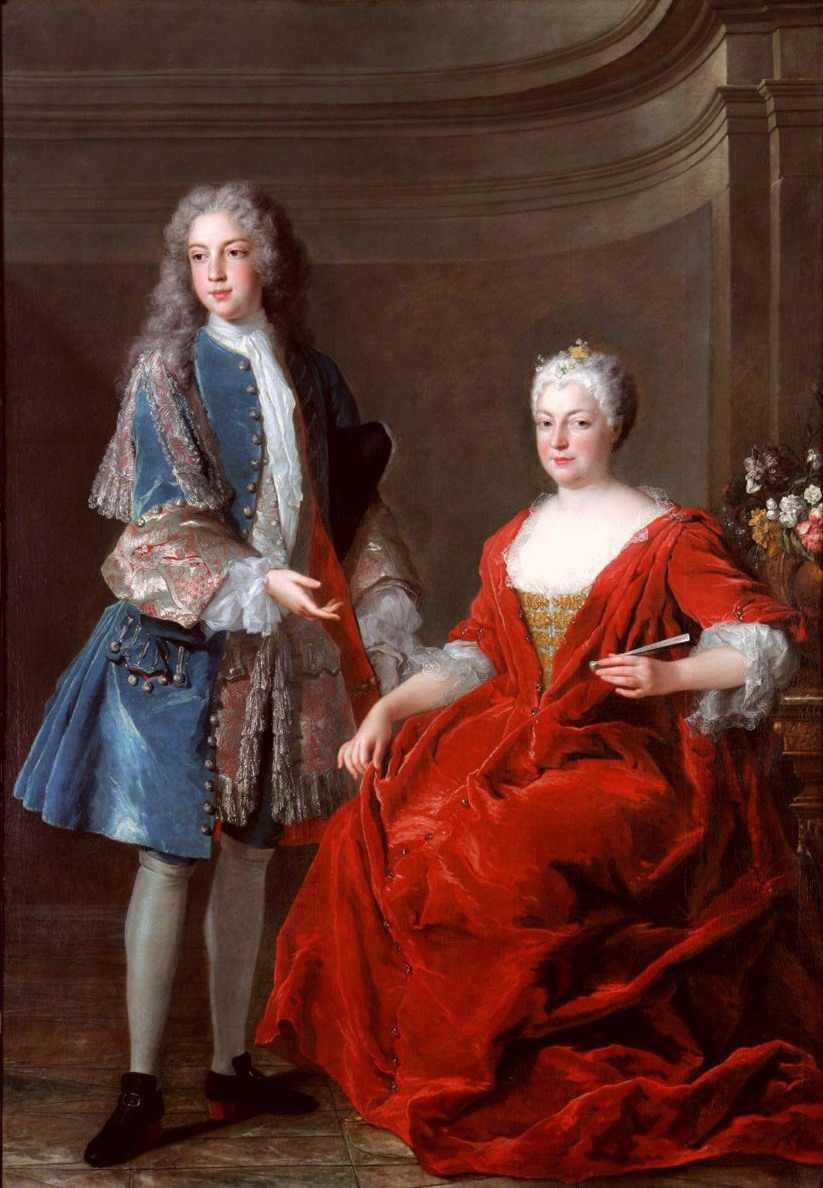
With his mother, c. 1722 by Alexis Simon Belle

Francis was born in Lunéville, Lorraine (now in France), the fourth and oldest surviving son of Leopold, Duke of Lorraine, and his wife Princess Élisabeth Charlotte d'Orléans. He was connected with the Habsburgs through his grandmother Eleonore, daughter of Emperor Ferdinand III. He was very close to his brother Prince Charles Alexander of Lorraine and sister Princess Anne Charlotte of Lorraine.

Emperor Charles VI favoured the family, who, besides being his cousins, had served the house of Habsburg with distinction. He had designed to marry his daughter Maria Theresa to Francis' older brother Léopold Clément, Hereditary Prince of Lorraine. On Leopold Clement's death, Charles adopted the younger brother as his future son-in-law. Francis was brought up in Vienna with Maria Theresa with the understanding that they were to be married, and a real affection arose between them.

At the age of 15, when he was brought to Vienna, he was established in the Silesian Duchy of Teschen, which had been mediatised and granted to his father by the Emperor in 1722. Francis succeeded his father as Duke of Lorraine in 1729. In 1731 he was initiated into freemasonry (Grand Lodge of England) by John Theophilus Desaguliers at a specially convened lodge in The Hague at the house of the British Ambassador, Philip Stanhope, 4th Earl of Chesterfield. During a subsequent visit to England, Francis was made a Master Mason at another specially convened lodge at Houghton Hall, the Norfolk estate of British Prime Minister Robert Walpole.

Maria Theresa arranged for Francis to become "Lord Lieutenant" (locum tenens) of Hungary in 1732. He was not excited about this position, but Maria Theresa wanted him closer to her. In June 1732, he agreed to go to the Hungarian capital, Pressburg (today's Bratislava).

When the War of the Polish Succession broke out in 1733, France used it as an opportunity to seize Lorraine, since France's chief minister, Cardinal Fleury, was concerned that, as a Habsburg possession, it would bring Austrian power too close to France.

A preliminary peace was concluded in October 1735 and ratified in the Treaty of Vienna in November 1738. Under its terms, Stanisław I, the father-in-law of King Louis XV and the losing claimant to the Polish throne, received Lorraine, while Francis, in compensation for his loss, was made heir to the Grand Duchy of Tuscany, which he would inherit in 1737.

In March 1736, the Emperor persuaded Francis, his future son-in-law, to secretly exchange Lorraine for the Grand Duchy of Tuscany. France had demanded that Maria Theresa's fiancé surrender his ancestral Duchy of Lorraine to accommodate the deposed King of Poland. The Emperor considered other possibilities (such as marrying her to the future Charles III of Spain) before announcing the engagement of the couple. If something were to go wrong, Francis would become governor of the Austrian Netherlands.

Elisabeth of Parma had also wanted the Grand Duchy of Tuscany for her son Charles III of Spain; Gian Gastone de' Medici was childless and was related to Elisabeth via her great-grandmother Margherita de' Medici. As a result, Elisabeth's sons could claim by right of being a descendant of Margherita.

Although fighting stopped after the preliminary peace, the final peace settlement had to wait until the death of Gian Gastone in 1737 to allow the territorial exchanges provided for by the peace settlement to go into effect.

On 31 January 1736, Francis agreed to marry Maria Theresa. He hesitated three times (and laid down the feather before signing). Especially his mother Élisabeth Charlotte d'Orléans and his brother Prince Charles Alexander of Lorraine were against the loss of Lorraine. On 1 February, Maria Theresa sent Francis a letter: she would withdraw from her future reign when a male successor to her father appeared.

== Marriage ==
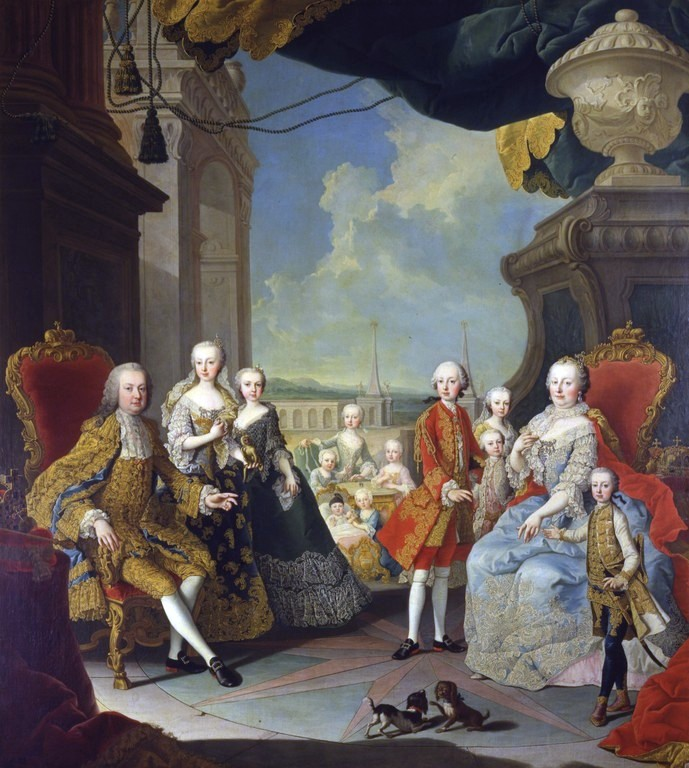
Francis I and his family (by Martin van Meytens)

Francis and Maria Theresa married on 12 February 1736 in the Augustinian Church, Vienna. The wedding was held on 14 February 1736. The (secret) treaty between the Emperor and Francis was signed on 4 May 1736. On 5 January 1737, instruments of cession were signed at Pontremoli between Spain and the Empire, with Spain ceding Parma, Piacenza and Tuscany to the Holy Roman Empire and the Empire recognizing Don Carlos of Spain as King of Naples and Sicily. On 10 January, the Spanish troops began their withdrawal from Tuscany and were replaced by 6,000 Austrians. On 24 January 1737, Francis received Tuscany from his father-in-law. Until then, Maria Theresa was Duchess of Lorraine.

Gian Gastone de' Medici, who died on 9 July 1737, was the second cousin of Francis (Gian Gastone and Francis' father Leopold were both great-grandchildren of Francis II, Duke of Lorraine), who also had Medici blood through his maternal great-great-grandmother Marie de' Medici, Queen consort of France and Navarre. In June 1737, Francis went to Hungary again to fight against the Turks. In October 1738, he was back in Vienna. On 17 December 1738, the couple travelled south, accompanied by his brother Charles, to visit Florence for three months. They arrived on 20 January 1739.

In 1744, Francis' brother Charles married a younger sister of Maria Theresa, Archduchess Maria Anna of Austria. In 1744, Charles became governor of the Austrian Netherlands, a post he held until his death in 1780.

== Reign ==
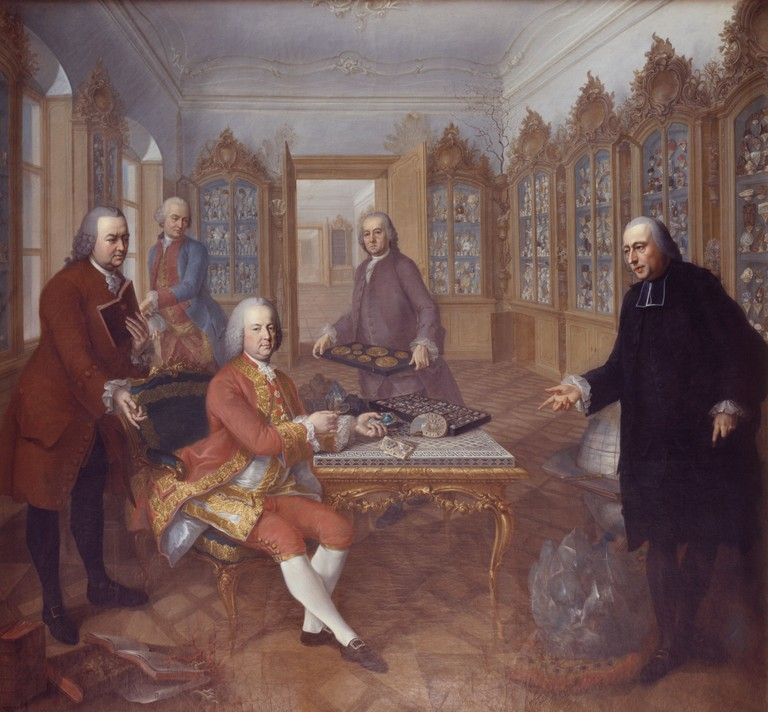
The emperor with his natural science advisors. From left to right: Gerard van Swieten, Johann Ritter von Baillou, Valentin Jamerai Duval (numismatist) and Abbé Johann Marcy

In the Treaty of Füssen, Maria Theresa secured his election as Emperor, which took place on 13 September 1745, and his coronation as emperor took place at the Imperial Cathedral of Saint Bartholomew in Frankfurt am Main on 4 October 1745. Francis succeeded Charles VII, and Maria Theresa made him co-regent of her hereditary dominions.

Francis was a serial adulterer; many of his affairs were well-known and indiscreet, notably one with Princess Maria Wilhelmina of Auersperg, who was thirty years his junior. This particular affair was remarked upon in the letters and journals of visitors to the court and in those of his children.

He died suddenly in his carriage while returning from the opera at Innsbruck on 18 August 1765. He is buried in tomb number 55 in the Imperial Crypt in Vienna.

Maria Theresa and Francis I had sixteen children, amongst them the last pre-revolutionary queen consort of France, their youngest daughter, Marie Antoinette (1755–1793). Francis was succeeded as Emperor by his eldest son, Joseph II, and as Grand Duke of Tuscany by his younger son, Peter Leopold (later Emperor Leopold II). Maria Theresa retained the government of her dominions until her own death in 1780.

== Issue ==
| No. | Name | Birth | Death | Notes |
|---|---|---|---|---|
| 1 | Archduchess Maria Elisabeth of Austria | 5 February 1737 | 7 June 1740 | died in childhood, no issue. |
| 2 | Archduchess Maria Anna | 6 October 1738 | 19 November 1789 | died unmarried, no issue. |
| 3 | Archduchess Maria Carolina of Austria | 12 January 1740 | 25 January 1741 | died in childhood likely from smallpox, no issue. |
| 4 | Holy Roman Emperor Joseph II | 13 March 1741 | 20 February 1790 | married 1) Princess Isabella Maria of Parma (1741–1763), married 2) Princess Marie Josephe of Bavaria (1739–1767) – second cousin, had issue from his first marriage (two daughters, who died young). |
| 5 | Archduchess Maria Christina of Austria | 13 May 1742 | 24 June 1798 | married Prince Albert of Saxony, Duke of Teschen (1738–1822), her second cousin, had issue (one stillborn daughter). |
| 6 | Archduchess Maria Elisabeth of Austria | 13 August 1743 | 22 September 1808 | died unmarried, no issue. |
| 7 | Archduke Charles Joseph of Austria | 1 February 1745 | 18 January 1761 | died of smallpox, no issue. |
| 8 | Archduchess Maria Amalia of Austria | 26 February 1746 | 18 June 1804 | married Ferdinand I, Duke of Parma (1751–1802), had issue. |
| 9 | Holy Roman Emperor Leopold II | 5 May 1747 | 1 March 1792 | married Infanta Maria Luisa of Spain (1745–1792), had issue. Grand Duke of Tuscany from 1765 (abdicated 1790), Holy Roman Emperor from 1790, Archduke of Austria, King of Hungary and King of Bohemia from 1790. |
| 10 | Archduchess Maria Carolina of Austria | 17 September 1748 | 17 September 1748 | died during birth. |
| 11 | Archduchess Maria Johanna Gabriela of Austria | 4 February 1750 | 23 December 1762 | died of smallpox, no issue. |
| 12 | Archduchess Maria Josepha of Austria | 19 March 1751 | 15 October 1767 | died of smallpox, no issue. |
| 13 | Archduchess Maria Carolina of Austria | 13 August 1752 | 7 September 1814 | married King Ferdinand IV of Naples and Sicily (1751–1825); had issue. |
| 14 | Archduke Ferdinand of Austria | 1 June 1754 | 24 December 1806 | married Maria Beatrice d'Este, Duchess of Massa, heiress of Breisgau and of Modena, had issue (Austria-Este). Duke of Breisgau from 1803. |
| 15 | Archduchess Maria Antonia of Austria | 2 November 1755 | 16 October 1793 | married Louis XVI of France and Navarre (1754–1793) and became Marie Antoinette, Queen of France and Navarre; had issue (two sons and two daughters). |
| 16 | Archduke Maximilian Franz of Austria | 8 December 1756 | 27 July 1801 | Archbishop-Elector of Cologne, 1784. Died unmarried, no issue. |

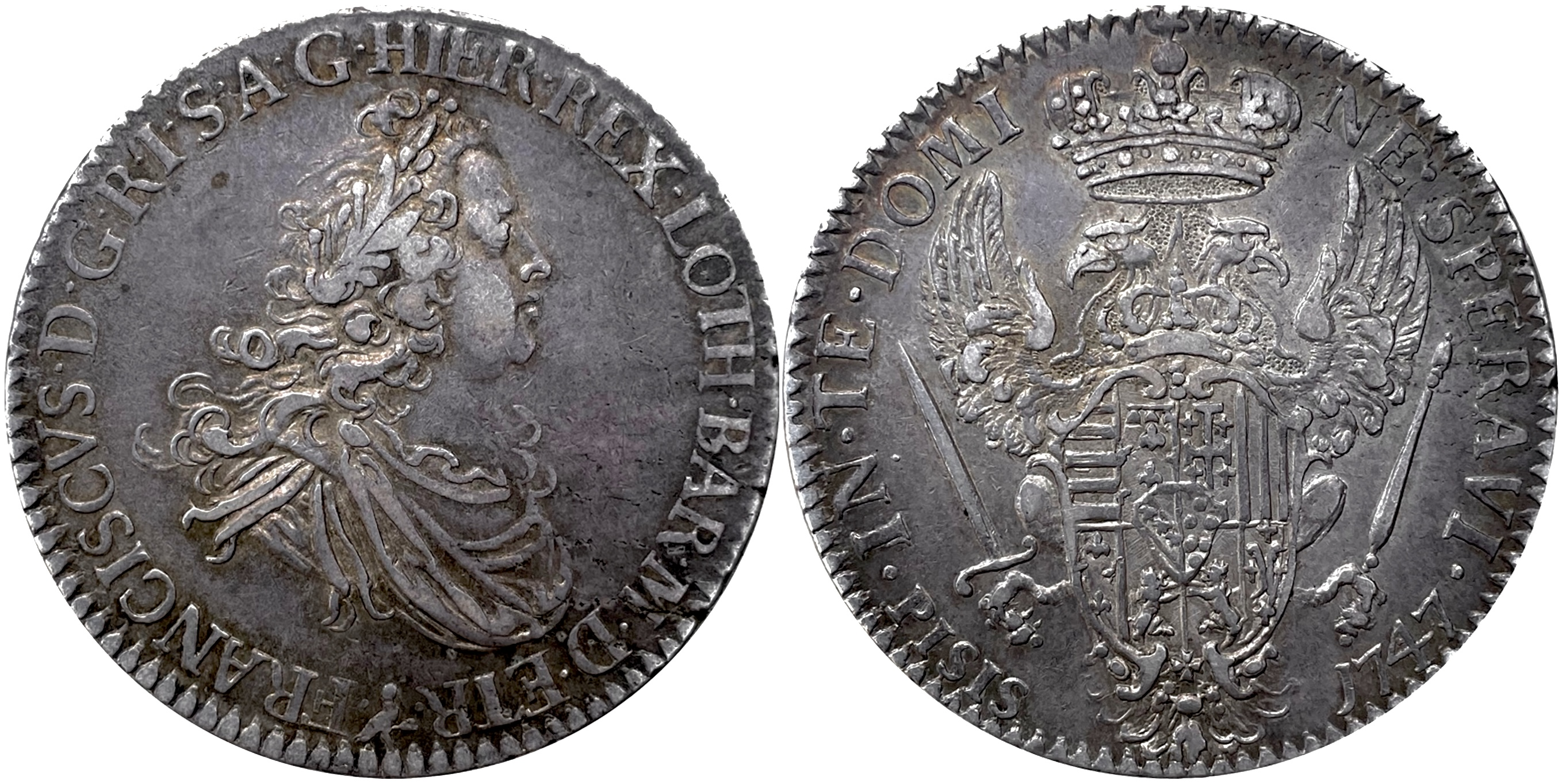
Silver coin: 10 paoli Grand Duchy of Tuscany - Francis, 1747

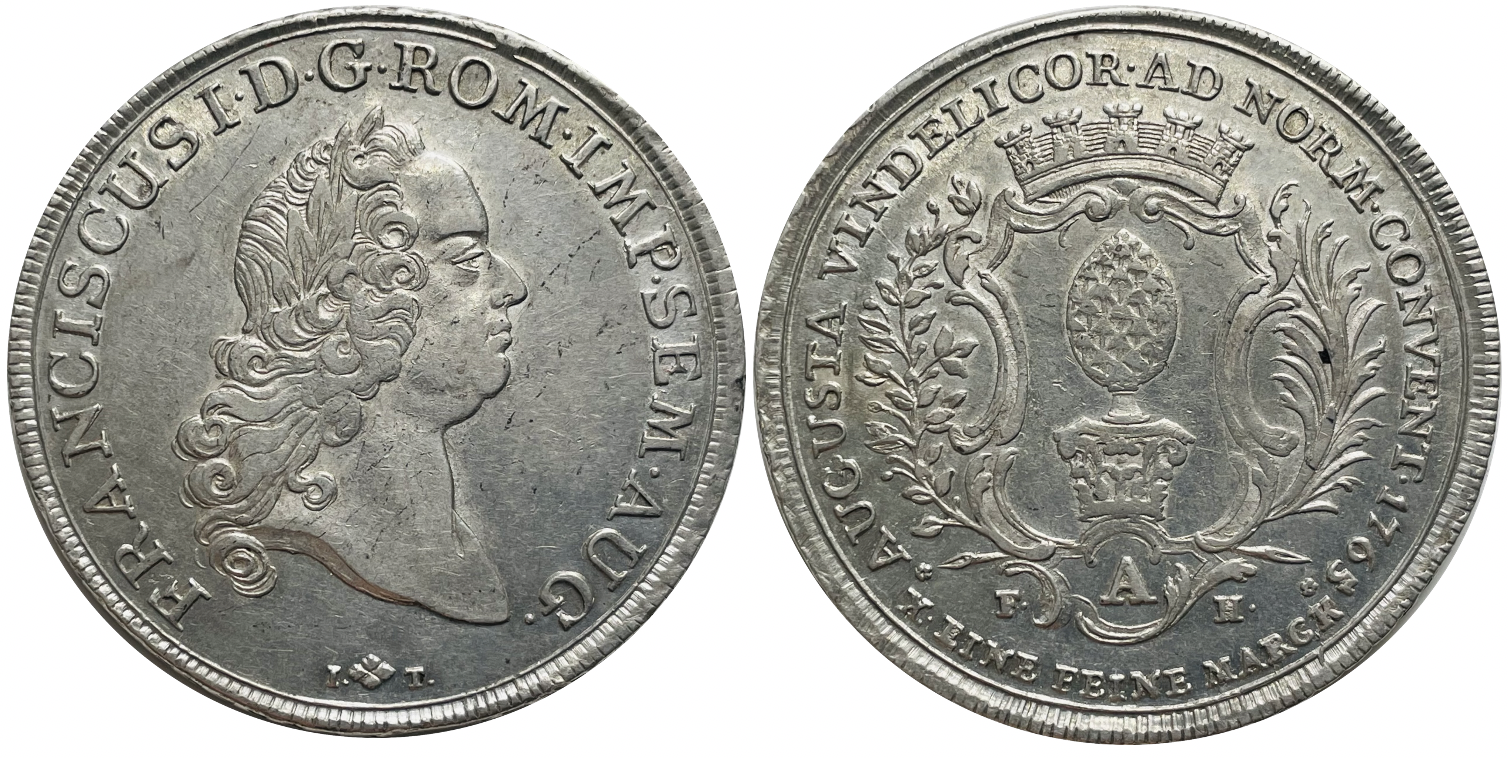
Silver coin: 1 conventionsthaler Augsburg Free City - Francis I, 1765

== Coat of arms ==
| Coat of arms | Coat of arms (Shield variant) | Coat of arms (Shield variant with supporters) |

== Ancestry ==
Ancestors of Francis I, Holy Roman Emperor

8. Nicholas II, Duke of Lorraine
4. Charles V, Duke of Lorraine
9. Claude Françoise of Lorraine
2. Leopold, Duke of Lorraine
10. Ferdinand III, Holy Roman Emperor
5. Eleonore of Austria, Queen of Poland
11. Eleonora Gonzaga
1. Francis I, Holy Roman Emperor
12. Louis XIII of France
6. Philippe I, Duke of Orléans
13. Anne of Austria
3. Élisabeth Charlotte of Orléans
14. Charles I Louis, Elector Palatine
7. Elizabeth Charlotte, Madame Palatine
15. Princess Charlotte of Hesse-Kassel

== See also ==
- Franz Joseph Toussaint
- Kings of Germany family tree
- List of people with the most children
- Francis Stephen Award

Francis I, Holy Roman Emperor House of Lorraine Born: 8 December 1708 Died: 18 August 1765
Regnal titles
| Preceded by Gian Gastone de' Medici | Grand Duke of Tuscany; 1737 – 1765 | Succeeded by Leopold II, Holy Roman Emperor |
| Preceded by Leopold, Duke of Lorraine | Duke of Lorraine; 1729 – 1737 | Succeeded by Stanislaus I of Poland |
| Preceded by Leopold, Duke of Lorraine | Duke of Teschen; 1729 – 1765 | Succeeded by Joseph II, Holy Roman Emperor |
| Preceded by Charles VII, Holy Roman Emperor | King in Germany; 1745 – 1764 | Succeeded by Joseph II, Holy Roman Emperor |
| Preceded by Charles VII, Holy Roman Emperor | Holy Roman Emperor; 1745 – 1765 | Succeeded by Joseph II, Holy Roman Emperor |
| Preceded by Maria Theresa of Austria as sole ruler | Archduke of Austria; Ruler of the Austrian Netherlands; 21 November 1740 – 1765 with Maria Theresa | Succeeded by Maria Theresa as sole ruler |
