= Archduchess Maria Elisabeth of Austria (born 1737) =

Austrian archduchess (1737–1740)

Archduchess Maria Elisabeth
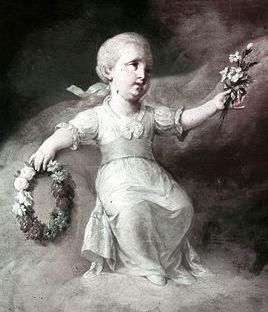
- Maria Elisabeth depicted in a mural by Franz Anton Maulbertsch in the Hofburg (Innsbruck), representing the four daughters of Maria Theresa who died in childhood
- Born: 5 February 1737; Vienna, Archduchy of Austria, Holy Roman Empire
- Died: 7 June 1740 (aged 3); Laxenburg, Archduchy of Austria, Holy Roman Empire
- Burial: Imperial Crypt
Names
- English: Mary Elizabeth Amelia Antonia Josephine Joanne Gabriella Agatha; German: Maria Elisabeth Amalia Antonia Josefa Johanna Gabriele Agathe; French: Marie Élisabeth Amélie Antoinette Joséphine Jeanne Gabrielle Agathe
- House: Habsburg-Lorraine
- Father: Francis I, Holy Roman Emperor
- Mother: Maria Theresa

Archduchess Maria Elisabeth of Austria (5 February 1737 – 7 June 1740) was the eldest child and daughter of Empress Maria Theresa and Francis I, Holy Roman Emperor.

== Life ==
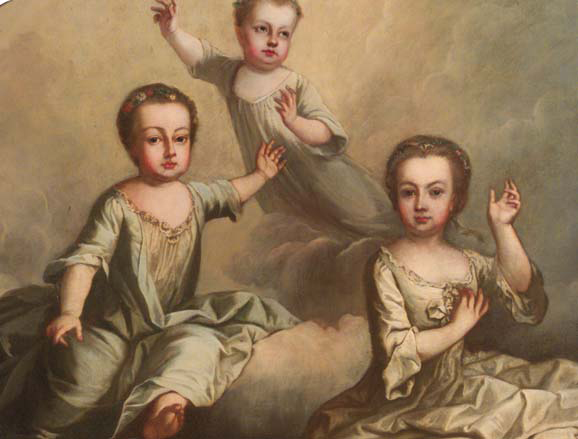
Three floating children, by Martin van Meytens (1748). Van Meytens was commissioned in 1748 by Empress Maria Theresa to produce a posthumous painting of her three daughters who had died in infancy. From left to right: Maria Carolina (1740–1741), Maria Carolina (1748) and Maria Elisabeth (1737–1740)

Maria Elisabeth was born on 5 February 1737 at the Schönbrunn Palace in Vienna, Austria. There was no great jubilation at the birth of the child, since her parents, as well as many courtiers, had wanted a son and heir.

A lively and beautiful child, she soon became the favourite of both her parents. Her grandfather, Emperor Charles VI, spoke with pleasure of his eldest granddaughter, whom he nicknamed Liesl, and often played with her. Maria Elisabeth was described as a lively and pretty child.

During a visit to the Laxenburg Castle on 7 June 1740, Maria Elisabeth suddenly became ill with stomach cramps and vomiting. Throughout the day, the stomach cramps alternated with ever-renewed vomiting and turned into intense diarrhorea and coughing until the archduchess died that night at 9 p.m., at the age of 3. Her father, Francis Stephen, detailed the death of his firstborn child:

At eight o'clock I was summoned and handed over to me a letter of the doctor, from which I deduced that it is time to take my wife away, for the child will not live longer. I walked away a little confused, and found my wife completely burst in tears when I arrived. I took them by the hand and took them to her apartments. Then I went back with the sick child. I had only been for a while when she sat up, looked at me, and said with a clear voice, "I commend myself, O my God!". Then she fell back and died in my arms.

Maria Elisabeth was the first member of the Habsburg-Lorraine family to be buried in the Maria Theresa Vault at the Imperial Crypt, in Vienna. One of her younger sisters was given her name.

== Ancestry ==
Ancestors of Archduchess Maria Elisabeth of Austria (born 1737)

8. Charles V, Duke of Lorraine
4. Leopold, Duke of Lorraine
9. Eleanor of Austria
2. Francis I, Holy Roman Emperor
10. Philippe I, Duke of Orléans
5. Élisabeth Charlotte d'Orléans
11. Elizabeth Charlotte of the Palatinate
1. Archduchess Marie Elisabeth of Austria
12. Leopold I, Holy Roman Emperor
6. Charles VI, Holy Roman Emperor
13. Eleonor Magdalene of Neuburg
3. Maria Theresa of Austria
14. Louis Rudolph, Duke of Brunswick-Wolfenbüttel
7. Elisabeth Christine of Brunswick
15. Christine Louise of Oettingen-Oettingen

== Bibliography ==
- Egghardt, Hanne: Maria Theresias Kinder. 16 Schicksale zwischen Glanz und Elend. Kremayr & Scheriau, Vienna 2010, ISBN 978-3-218-00813-6.
- Les trois petites archiduchesses, filles de l'impératrice Marie-Thérèse in French.
- Iby, Elfriede: "Marie-Thérèse, biographie d'une souveraine".
- Stollberg-Rilinger, Barbara (2017). Maria Theresia: Die Kaiserin in ihrer Zeit. Eine Biographie. Munich: C.H. Beck. ISBN 978-3-406-69748-7.
