= Archduke Charles Joseph of Austria (born 1745) =

Austrian archduke (1745-1761)

Archduke Charles Joseph
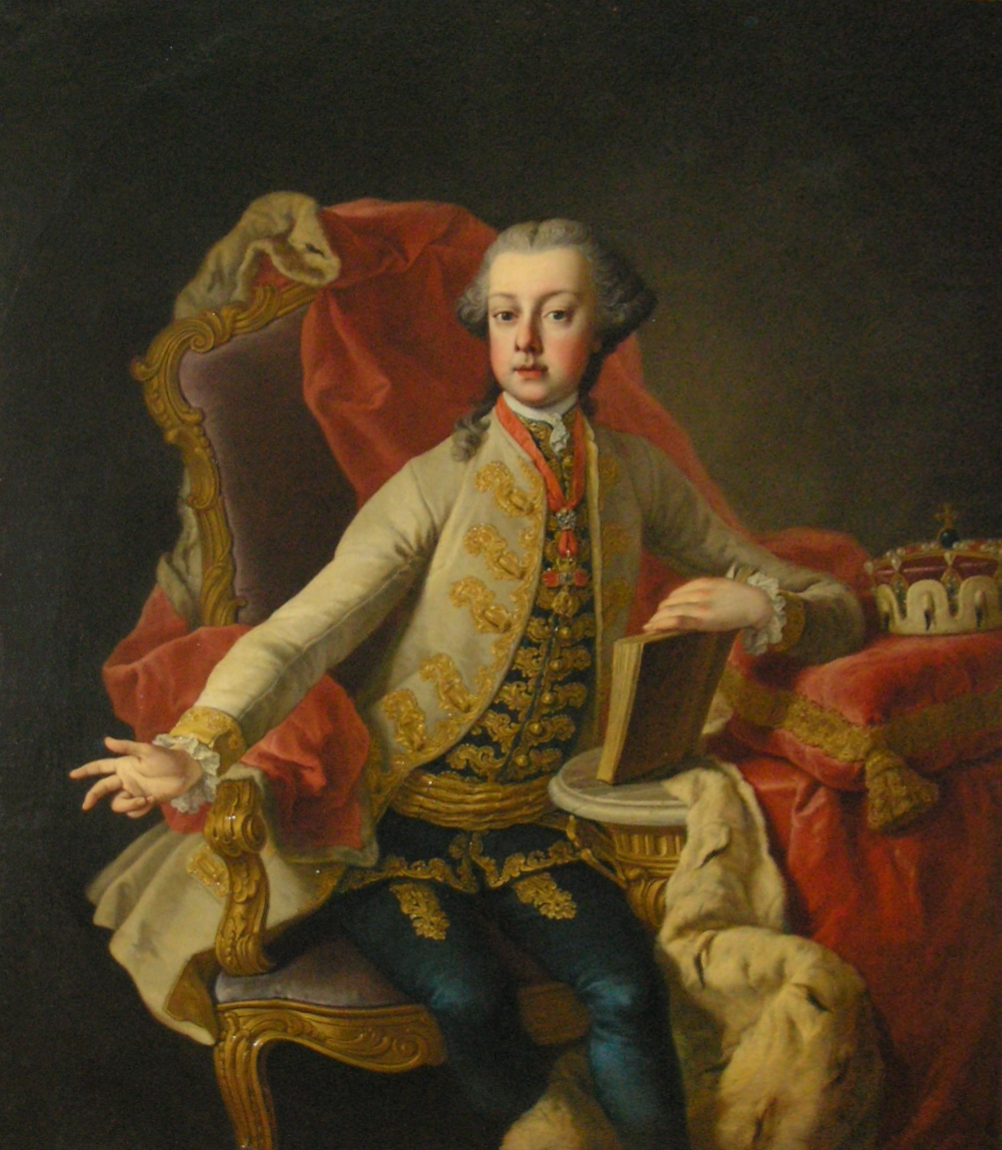
- Portrait by Martin van Meytens
- Born: 1 February 1745; Schönbrunn Palace, Vienna, Archduchy of Austria, Holy Roman Empire
- Died: 18 January 1761 (aged 15); Schönbrunn Palace, Vienna, Archduchy of Austria, Holy Roman Empire
- Burial: Imperial Crypt, Capuchin Church, Innere Stadt, Vienna
Names
- English: Charles Joseph Emmanuel John Nepomuk Anthony Prokop; German: Carl Josef Emanuel Johann Nepomuk Anton Prokop
- House: Habsburg-Lorraine
- Father: Prince Francis, Duke of Lorraine
- Mother: Maria Theresa

Archduke Charles Joseph of Austria (Carl Josef Emanuel Johann Nepomuk Anton Prokop; 1 February 1745 – 18 January 1761) was the second son and seventh child of the Habsburg ruler Empress Maria Theresa and her husband, Francis I, Holy Roman Emperor.

== Life ==
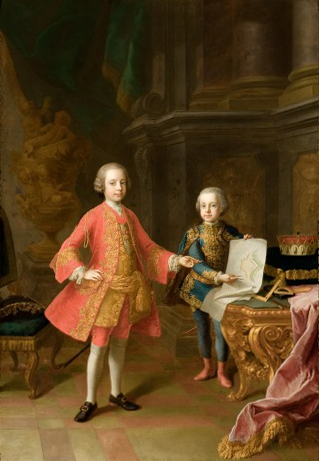
Portrait of Charles Joseph (right) and his older brother Joseph (left) by Martin van Meytens

Archduke Charles Joseph was born on 1 February 1745 at the Schönbrunn Palace in Vienna. He was the second son and seventh child of Francis I, Holy Roman Emperor, and his wife, Empress Maria Theresa.

Charles Joseph was the favourite son of Maria Theresa and Francis. He is known to have hated his older brother, the future Emperor Joseph II. He ridiculed him for his haughtiness and thought himself to be more deserving of the Crown of the Holy Roman Empire because he was the first son born to Maria Theresa as empress. Charles Joseph often said that he meant to contend with his brother for the imperial crown.

In contrast to his older brother Joseph, who later became Holy Roman Emperor, he was considered extroverted and open-minded. The boy soon became his parents' favorite son and, with his charm and intelligence, won the affection and respect of his siblings and the entire court.

== Death ==
The rivalry between the brothers was ended by Charles Joseph's early death from smallpox, two weeks before his sixteenth birthday. While his mother was sitting by his bed in tears, Charles Joseph told her:

You should not weep for me, dear mother, for had I lived, I would have brought you many more tears!

Charles Joseph is buried in the Imperial Crypt in Vienna. His heart was buried separately in the Habsburg Crypt in the Loreto chapel of the Augustinian Church in Vienna.

Had he survived or avoided the illness that killed him he would have become the next Holy Roman Emperor after his eldest brother's death in 1790.

== Ancestry ==
Ancestors of Archduke Charles Joseph of Austria (born 1745)

8. Charles V, Duke of Lorraine
4. Leopold, Duke of Lorraine
9. Eleonore of Austria
2. Francis I, Holy Roman Emperor
10. Philippe I, Duke of Orléans
5. Élisabeth Charlotte of Orléans
11. Elizabeth Charlotte of the Palatinate
1. Archduke Charles Joseph of Austria
12. Leopold I, Holy Roman Emperor
6. Charles VI, Holy Roman Emperor
13. Eleonore Magdalene of Neuburg
3. Maria Theresa of Austria
14. Louis Rudolph, Duke of Brunswick
7. Elisabeth Christine of Brunswick
15. Christine Louise of Oettingen-Oettingen

== Bibliography ==
- Mahan, J. Alexander: Maria Theresa of Austria, READ BOOKS 2007 ISBN 1-4067-3370-9
