= Rose Marie Toussaint =

Liver transplant surgeon

Rose Marie Toussaint is a Haitian-born Black female surgeon practicing liver transplants in the United States.

== Early life ==
Toussaint was born in Haiti and moved to Miami in 1970. Her goal of becoming a physician at this young age was evident by her serious study of math and science coursework. She was awarded her Bachelor of Science degree in Biology from Loyola University in 1978. Furthering her education, in 1983 she received her Doctorate in Medicine from Howard University.

She wrote an autobiography, Never Question the Miracle: A Surgeon’s Story, in which she describes the prediction of a Vodun priest who predicted she would be a doctor when she grew up. Rose Marie Toussaint is also the founder of the American National Transplant Foundation Inc, where she works with those that need assistance to defray the cost of organ transplants.

== Howard University ==
While graduating from Howard University in 1983, she also maintained high honors within the program. Following her schooling she interned at the Howard University Hospital. Toussaint then became the chief surgeon at Howard University for the liver transplant center. Prior to this, she trained under Thomas Starzl at the University of Pittsburgh Medical School for three years. Starzl also has more liver transplants than anyone else in the world. In 1997, she left Howard University Hospital.

== Professional career ==
Toussaint was commended by Dr. Clive Callender, the Howard University Medical Center Director.

=== Organ Donation / Transplantation ===
Toussaint became an advocate for those who donate organs. Her patients often weren't able to be kept alive long enough to see a liver or kidney transplant. "Twelve patients die [nationwide] every day waiting for an organ," said Toussaint, who lives in North Laurel with her husband, Michael. "This is not acceptable. I want to do something to change this." She founded the National Transplant Foundation in an effort to increase overall donation size.
