= Toussaint Louverture (disambiguation) =

Toussaint Louverture (1743–1803) was the leader of the Haitian Revolution.

Toussaint Louverture or Toussaint L'Ouverture may also refer to:

== Places ==
- Toussaint Louverture International Airport, Tabarre, Port-au-Prince, Haiti
- Toussaint L'Ouverture County Cemetery, Franklin, Williamson County, Tennessee, USA

== Other uses ==
- Toussaint Louverture (film), a 2012 French film
- Toussaint Louverture: The Story of the Only Successful Slave Revolt in History, a three-act play by C. L. R. James
- Toussaint L'Ouverture, song by experimental rock band Swans from their 2014 album To Be Kind
- The song "Toussaint L'Ouverture" from The Santana Band's 1971 album Santana

== See also ==
- Donaldson Toussaint L'Ouverture Byrd II (1932–2013), U.S. jazz musician
- Toussaint (disambiguation)
- Ouverture (disambiguation)
