= Franz Joseph Toussaint =

Austrian politician

Franz or François Joseph Toussaint was advisor and minister of finance to Empress Maria Theresa, being appointed minister of finance in Vienna on 8 June 1741. He was also an advisor to Franz Stephen of Lorraine, later Franz I (1708–1765).
