= Archduchess Maria Anna of Austria (born 1738) =

Austrian archduchess and abbess (1738–1789)

Archduchess Maria Anna
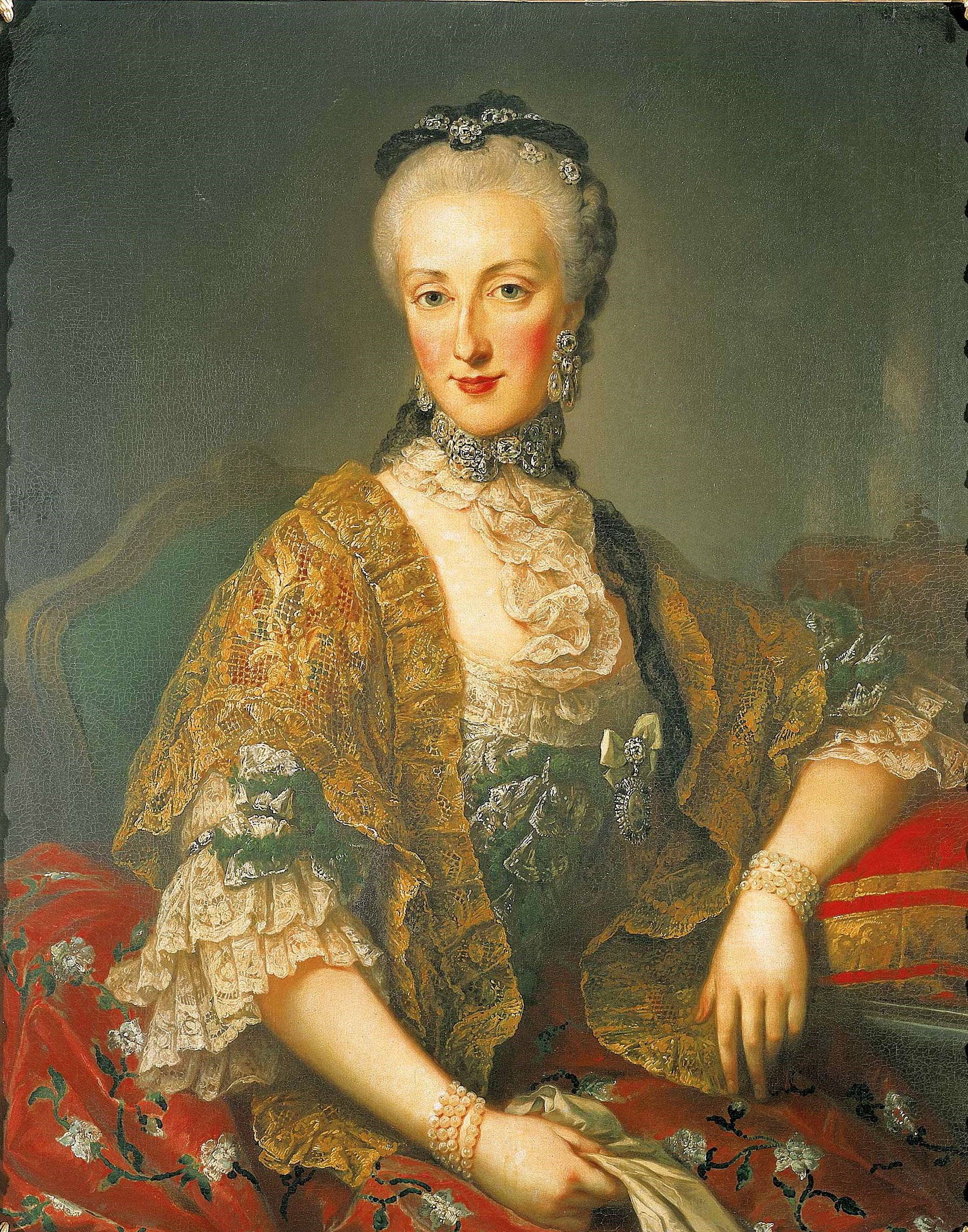
- Portrait by Martin van Meytens, 1760s
- Born: 6 October 1738; Hofburg Palace, Vienna, Archduchy of Austria, Holy Roman Empire
- Died: 19 November 1789 (aged 51); Klagenfurt, Duchy of Carinthia, Holy Roman Empire
Names
- English: Mary Anne Josephine Antonia; German: Maria Anna Josefa Antonia; French: Marie Anne Joséphine Antoinette
- House: Habsburg-Lorraine
- Father: Francis I, Holy Roman Emperor
- Mother: Maria Theresa

Archduchess Maria Anna of Austria (Maria Anna Josepha Antonia; 6 October 1738 – 19 November 1789) was the second child of Francis I, Holy Roman Emperor, and Maria Theresa, Queen of Hungary and Bohemia. As a child, and for a time the eldest surviving child, she was heiress presumptive, but she suffered from ill health and physical disability, and did not marry. In 1766 she became abbess of the Theresian Institution of Noble Ladies in Prague. Soon thereafter she moved to Klagenfurt and remained there for the rest of her life. Her palace in Klagenfurt, the Mariannengasse, now houses the Episcopal Palace.

== Biography ==
=== Early life ===
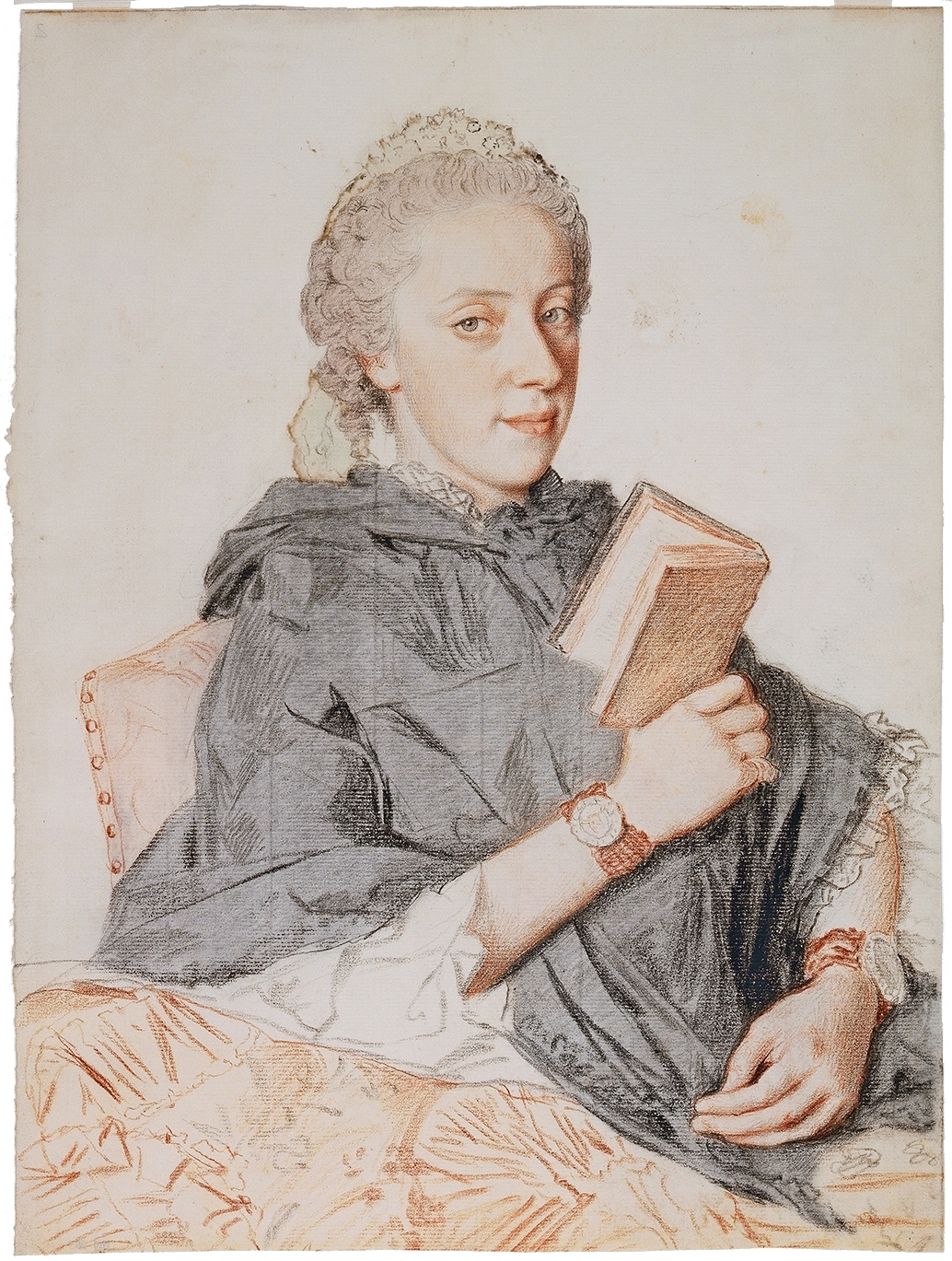
Watercolor of Maria Anna by Liotard, 1762

Archduchess Maria Anna (known as Marianna) was born on 6 October 1738 at the Hofburg Palace in Vienna, the center of the Habsburg monarchy. As the second but eldest surviving daughter of Maria Theresa, Queen of Hungary and Bohemia, and Francis I, Holy Roman Emperor, she was heiress presumptive of the hereditary lands of the Austrian Habsburgs between 1740 and 1741, until her younger brother Joseph (later to be the Holy Roman Emperor Joseph II) was born.

Her mother gave her the customary education of the princely courts at that time. Maria Anna's musical talents were encouraged, but not her humanities talents. Maria Anna was the child least respected and loved by Maria Theresa—her younger brother Joseph and sisters Maria Elisabeth and Maria Christina always received the attention and care of the Empress: Joseph because he was the male heir, Liesl because she was considered the most beautiful of the daughters, and Mimi because she was the undisputed favorite child of her mother.

=== Reign of Maria Theresa ===
Maria Anna was highly intelligent but physically disabled. She suffered from bad health, worsened by the drafty and cold rooms of the Hofburg Palace. In 1757 she contracted pneumonia and almost died, the last rites being called for her. Although she survived, her breathing capacity was permanently damaged, and she also developed a fusion of her spine which caused her to have a lump on her back. After that time, she began to have a close relationship with her father, and reportedly became Francis I's favourite child. She shared his interest in science and conducted experiments in chemistry and physics. Despite being disabled, Maria Anna often played important roles in major events of state, including acting as sponsor at the christening of her youngest sister Marie Antoinette.

In July 1765 the whole Imperial family traveled to Innsbruck for the wedding of the second-oldest son, Leopold. They halted in Klagenfurt, where Maria Anna visited the small monastery that belonged to the Order of Saint Elisabeth, established there in 1710. The encounter with the sisters was to be a turning point in Maria Anna's life. Thea Leitner explains that the Archduchess became enthusiastic for the monastic life because the nuns did not care about appearances and Maria Anna always lived with the fear of being ridiculed because of her hump.

The death of Emperor Francis I on 18 August 1765 was a devastating blow for Maria Anna. Because her mother was unable to find a royal husband for her, in 1766 Maria Anna was made Princess-Abbess of the Theresian Imperial and Royal Convent for Noble Ladies (Frauenstift) in Prague with the promise of 80,000 florins per year. Despite the opposition of her mother, she decided to give up the Prague position and became an abbess in Klagenfurt with a smaller provision. A palace for her was built by Nicolò Pacassi near the monastery as her residence, the construction of which was completed in 1771.

To the abbess of the convent, she wrote:

Gott hat mir die Gnade gegeben, die Welt und ihre Eitelkeit zu erkennen, und dadurch mir die Stärke erteilt, mein Leben nicht als Klosterfrau, doch in der Einsamkeit und im Dienste der Nächsten zu schließen. Ich habe dazu Klagenfurt ausgewählt, und zwar Sie und ihre frommen Schwestern, hoffend, dass mein unvollkommener Wert durch Ihre guten Beispiele angeeifert, meine Seligkeit mir gewiss versichert wird.
"God has given me the grace to know the world and its vanity, and thereby given me the strength to close my life not as a nun, but in solitude and in the service of neighbors. I have thus selected Klagenfurt, specifically you and your pious sisters, hoping that—my imperfect value spurred on by your good examples—my salvation is certainly assured to me."

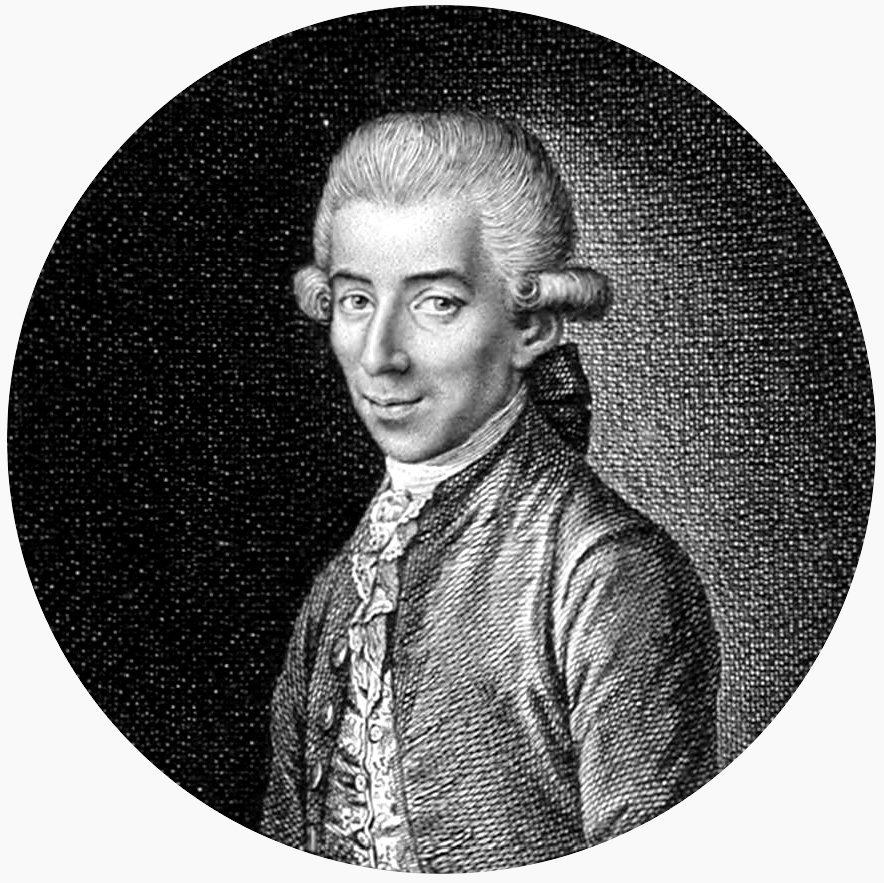
Ignaz von Born. Engraving by Jacob Adam.

During the time prior to her final move to Klagenfurt, Maria Anna completed her father's coin collection (which later became part of the Vienna Museum of Natural History) with the help of her mentor Ignaz von Born, and established her own mineral and insect collection. She financed social projects, archaeological exhumations, artists and scientists.

Maria Anna also wrote a book about her mother's politics. Her watercolors and drawings were praised in the professional world. Maria Anna was made an honorary member of the Academy of Fine Arts Vienna in 1767 and elected member of the Accademia di Belle Arti di Firenze in 1769.

Despite her talents and intelligence, Maria Anna was disliked by high society because her scientific interests were considered unsuitable for her gender, but she was appreciated by the scientific and art world.

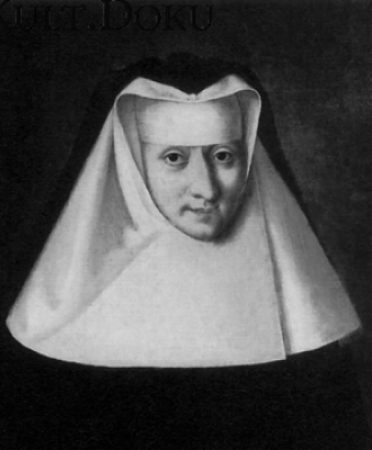
Abbess Xaveria Gasser.

=== Reign of Joseph ===
Empress Maria Theresa died on 29 November 1780, and four months later, Maria Anna moved permanently to Klagenfurt. She quickly developed a deep friendship with Xaveria Gasser, Abbess of the convent. Thanks to the generous financial support of the Archduchess the monastery hospital could soon be extended, and her own personal physician supervised the patients of the hospital. She also provided welfare assistance in the municipality of Klagenfurt.

Her friends were nuns, artists, scientists, and nobles, including the Carinthian iron industrialist Maximilian Thaddäus von Egger. Some of them belonged to the Freemasons. In 1783, the Klagenfurt Masonic Lodge was founded with a dedication "to charitable Marianna" (Zur wohltätigen Marianna) as she was called. Maria Anna devoted herself in Klagenfurt to her scientific interests. She discovered her love for archeology: she donated 30,000 florins for excavations at Zollfeld and also took part in the excavations herself.

Close to her younger sister Maria Elisabeth, the two lived together in the same convents until their deaths. While her youngest sister, Marie Antoinette, was traveling on her way to Versailles in 1770, she stayed at Klagenfurt for one night.

From the winter of 1788 Maria Anna's health deteriorated further. Her shortness of breath became worse and she could hardly move without a wheelchair. She died on 19 November 1789 in the presence of her closest friends. Reportedly, her last words were:

Es ist wohl ein gutes Land, ich hab es immer lieb gehabt. Es sind gute Menschen, mit denen ich vergnügt lebte und die ich hart verlasse.
"It is indeed a good country, I have always loved it. There are good people with whom I lived happily and I leave them reluctantly."

Maria Anna left her entire inheritance (amounting to more than 150,000 guilders) to the monastery of Klagenfurt. Her brother, Emperor Joseph II, deducted the inheritance tax from the income. Her palace is now home to the Prince Bishop's residence, in the Mariannengasse.

== Family ==
Maria Anna never married and had no children.

=== Gallery ===
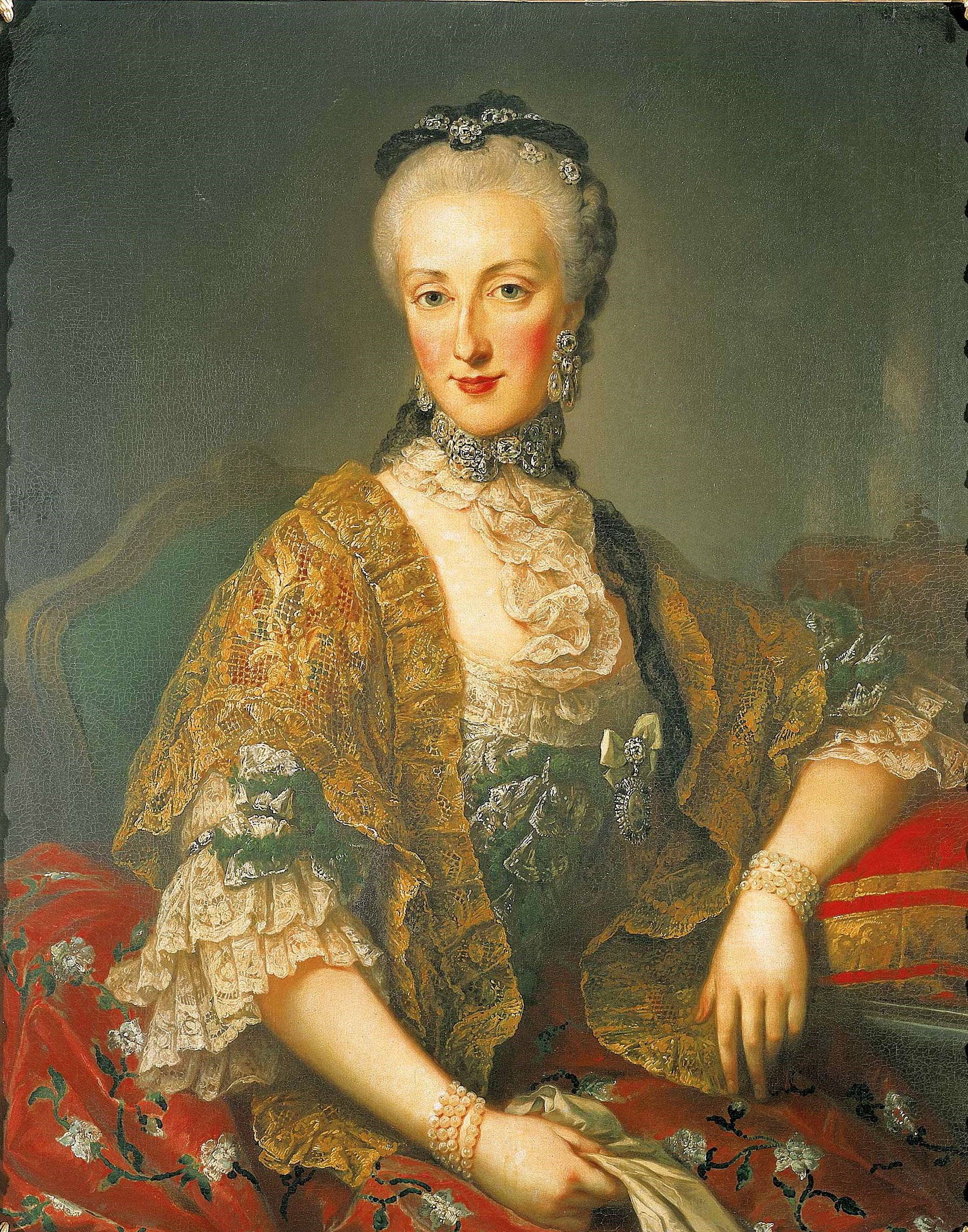
Maria Anna

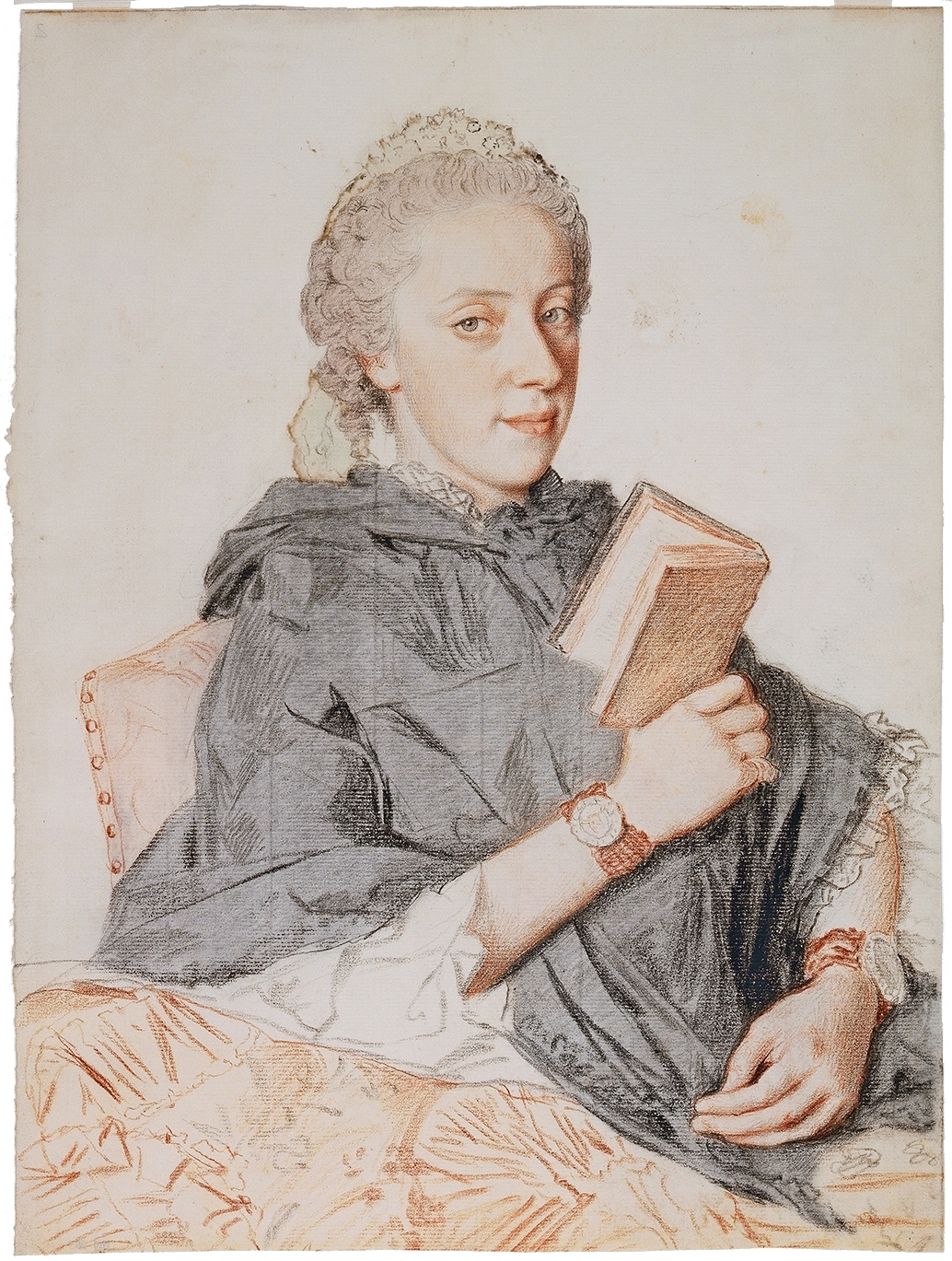
Maria Anna in 1762 by Liotard

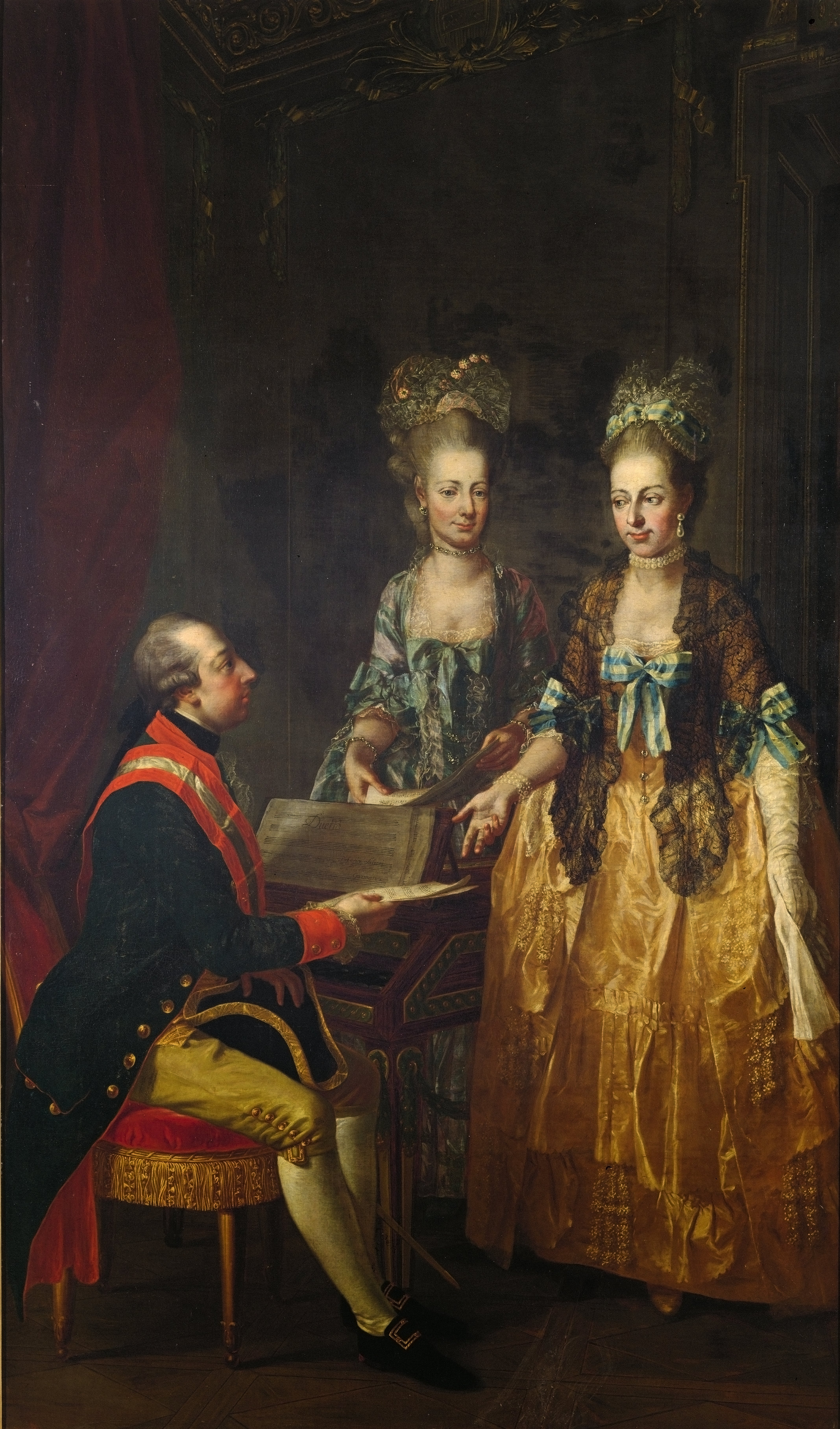
Joseph II, Holy Roman Emperor with Maria Anna and Archduchess Maria Elisabeth

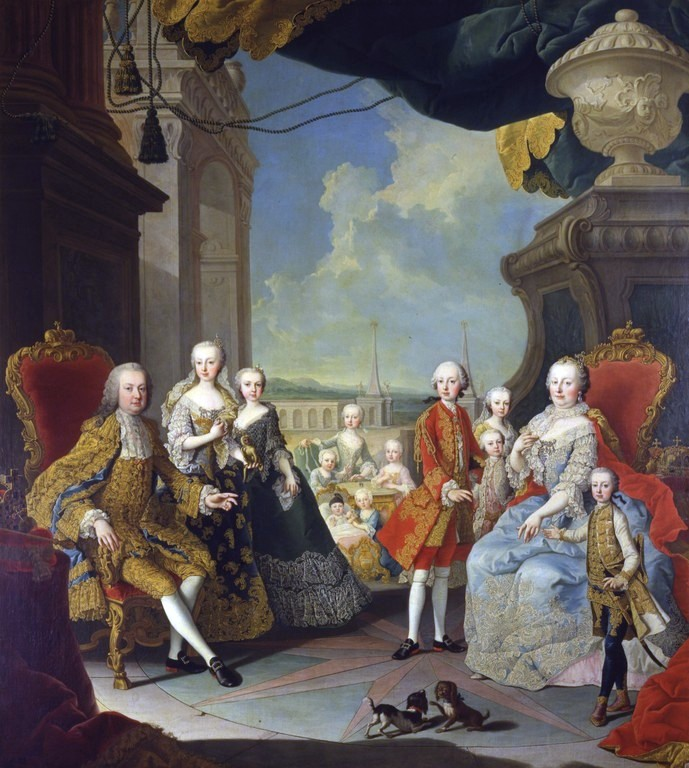
Maria Anna's family

== Legacy ==
Maria Anna is the protagonist of the historical novel ‘The Case of Princess Schwarzenberg 1757’ by Martina Grenze.

== Ancestry ==
Ancestors of Archduchess Maria Anna of Austria (born 1738)

8. Charles V, Duke of Lorraine
4. Leopold, Duke of Lorraine
9. Eleonore of Austria
2. Francis I, Holy Roman Emperor
10. Philippe I, Duke of Orléans
5. Élisabeth Charlotte of Orléans
11. Elizabeth Charlotte of the Palatinate
1. Archduchess Maria Anna of Austria
12. Leopold I, Holy Roman Emperor
6. Charles VI, Holy Roman Emperor
13. Eleonore Magdalene of Neuburg
3. Maria Theresa of Austria
14. Louis Rudolph, Duke of Brunswick
7. Elisabeth Christine of Brunswick
15. Christine Louise of Oettingen-Oettingen

== Bibliography ==
- Brigitte Hamann (1990). "Maria Anna". Neue Deutsche Biographie (in German). Vol. 16. Berlin: Duncker & Humblot. pp. 191–192. (full text online).
- Thea Leitner: Habsburgs vergessene Kinder. Piper, München 1996, ISBN 3-492-21865-2
- Friedrich Weissensteiner: Die Töchter Maria Theresias. Kremayer & Scheriau, Wien 1991, ISBN 3-218-00591-4
- Constantin von Wurzbach: Habsburg, Maria Anna (1738–1789) in: Biographisches Lexikon des Kaiserthums Oesterreich, vol. 7. Imperial and Royal Court and State Printing House, Vienna 1861, p 26. online
