= Franz Anton Maulbertsch =

Austrian painter and engraver

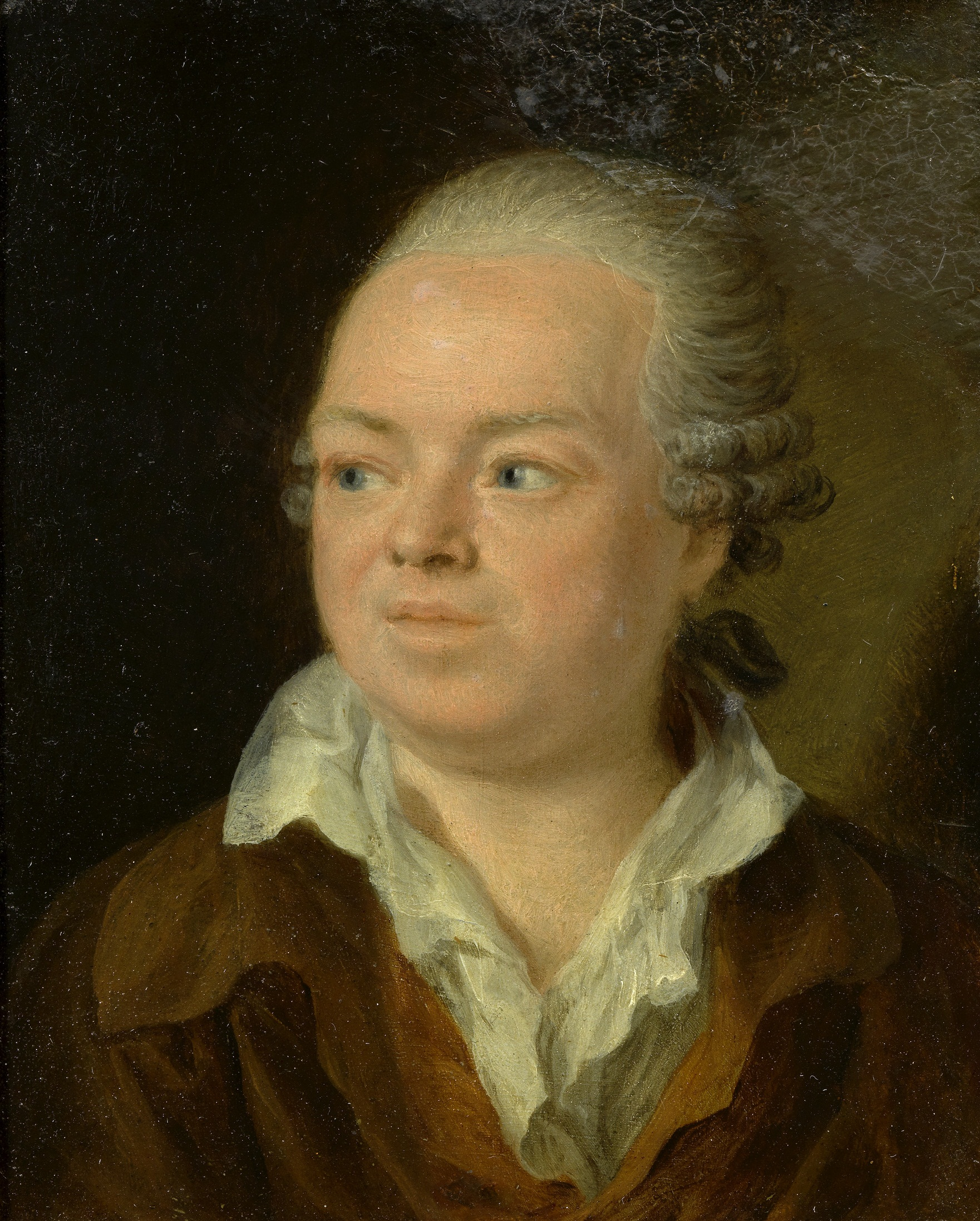
- Maulbertsch portrait by Martin Johann Schmidt
- Born: 7 June 1724; Langenargen
- Died: 8 August 1796 (aged 72); Vienna, Holy Roman Empire
- Occupations: Painter and engraver
- Known for: German Rococo painting

Franz Anton Maulbertsch (7 June 1724 – 8 August 1796) was an Austrian painter and engraver, one of the most renowned exponents of Rococo painting in the German and Hungarian regions.

Maulbertsch was born in Langenargen and studied in the Academy of Vienna. Through the knowledge of Paul Troger, he was influenced by the Venetian painters Piazzetta and Giovanni Battista Pittoni. He also studied the frescoes by Sebastiano Ricci in the Schönbrunn Palace in Vienna, and frequented Giambattista Tiepolo, who was active in Würzburg starting from 1750.

An appreciated frescoer, he received numerous commissions, mostly of ecclesiastical theme. He produced art for churches in Bicske, Kalocsa, Vienna's Michaelerkirche and Piaristenkirche Maria Treu. He also decorated the Porta Coeli in Moravia, the Kroměříž Archbishop's Palace and the villa of Halbturn.

He painted the massive ceiling of the Philosophical Hall at the Strahov monastery in Prague in 1794 in just six months.

He also painted a portrait of Narcissus of Jerusalem.

He died at Vienna in 1796.

== Gallery ==
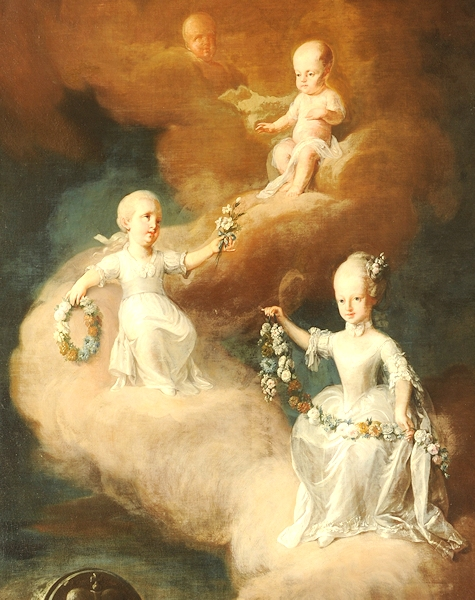
Deceased children of Maria Theresa (mural in Riesensaal, Hofburg, Innsbruck (c. 1765).

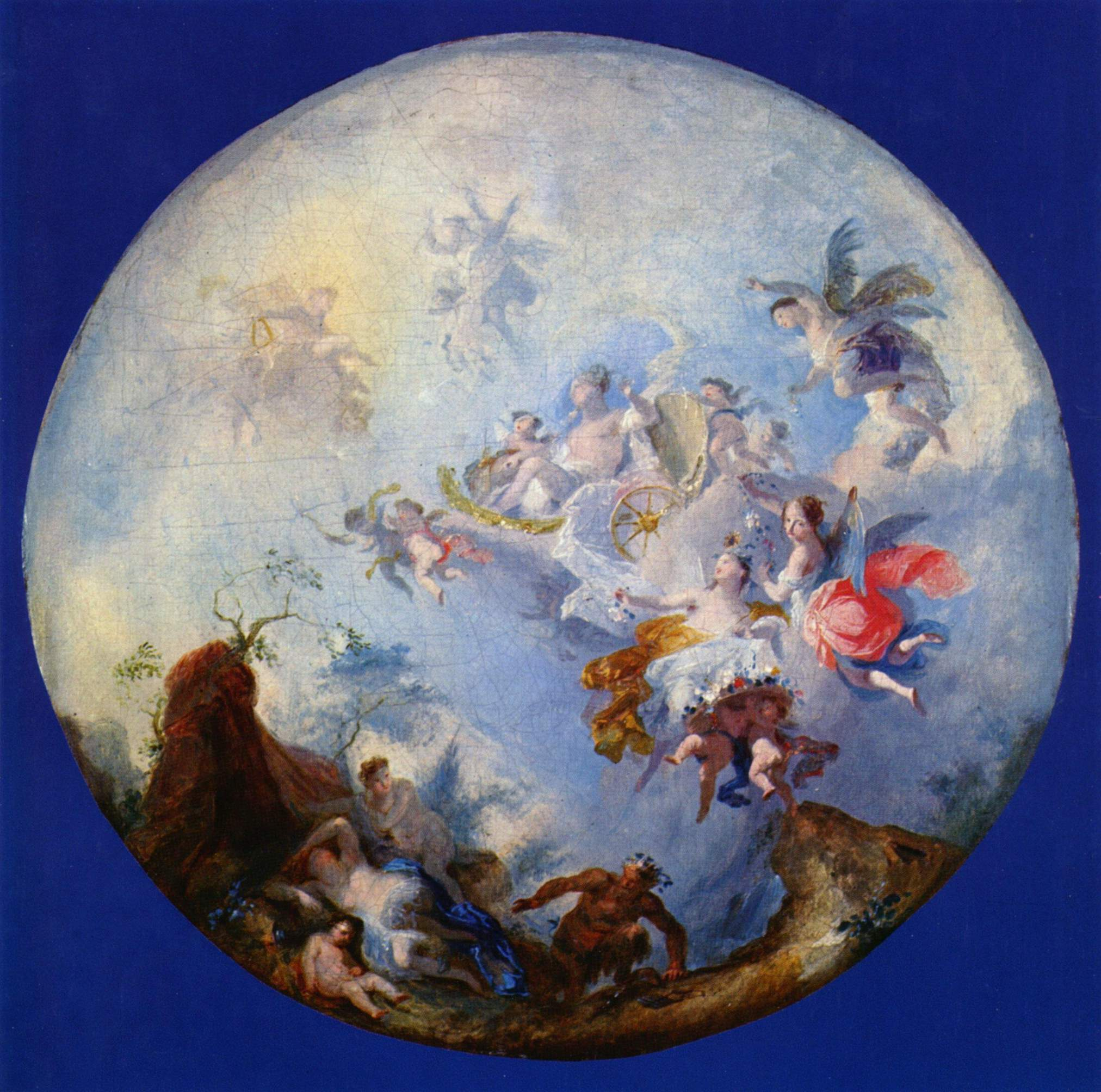
Jupiter and Antiope (c. 1780).

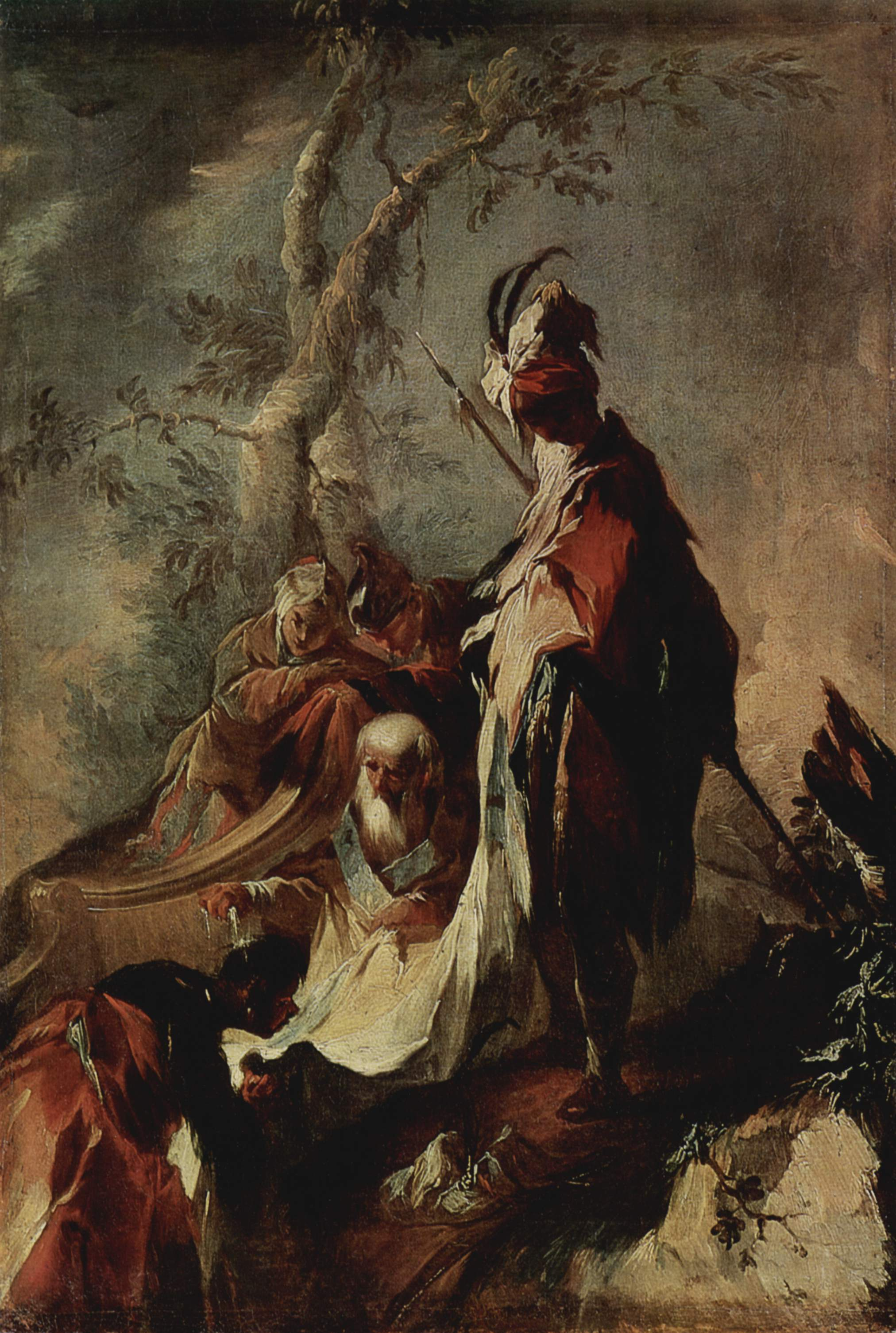
Philip the Apostle Baptizes a Eunuch.

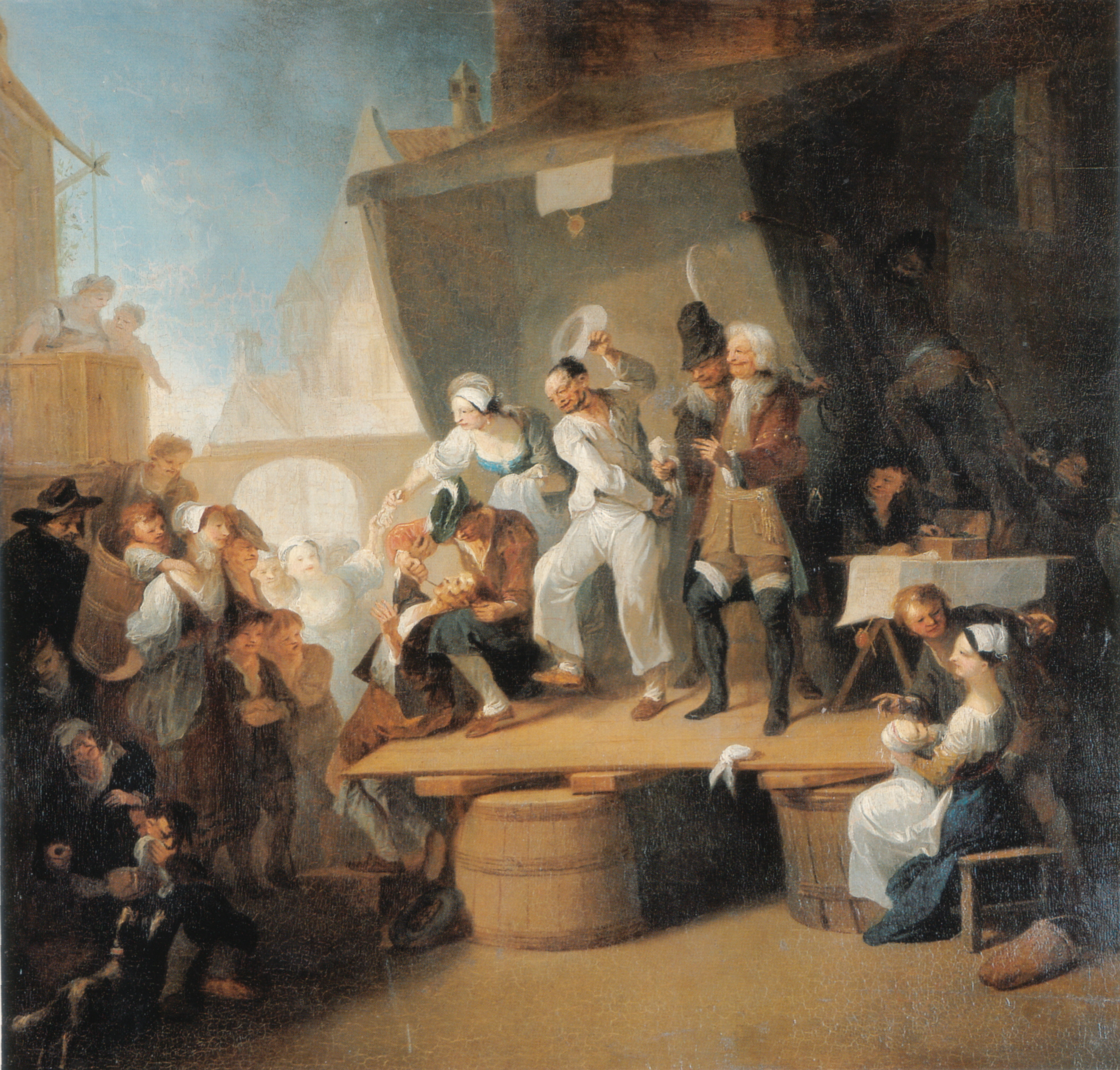
A Barber surgeon at Work.

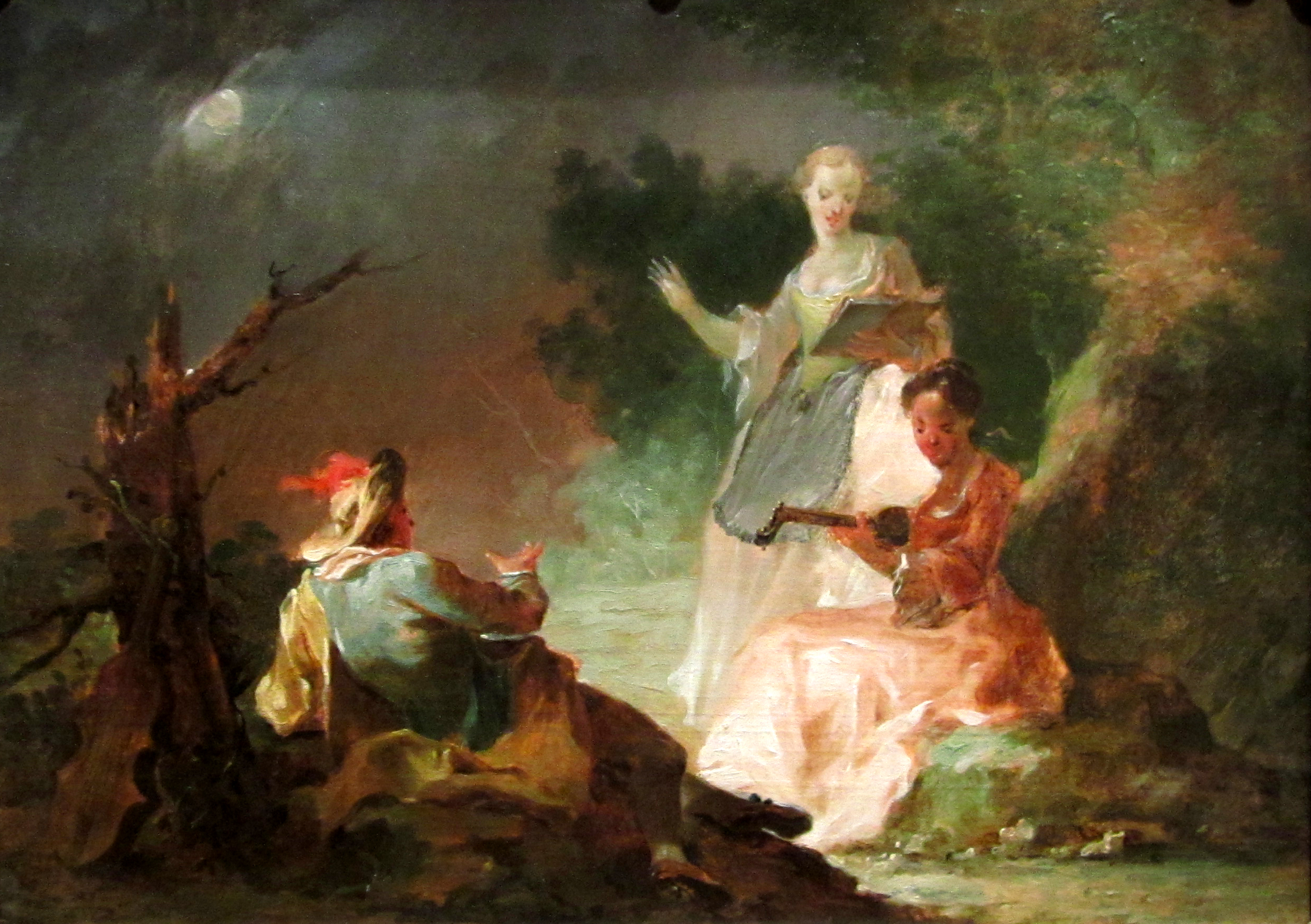
Pastoral Serenade.
