= Le feste d'Apollo =

Opera by Christoph Willibald Gluck

Title page of the original libretto

Le feste d'Apollo (The Festivals of Apollo) is an operatic work by Christoph Willibald von Gluck, first performed at the Teatrino della Corte, Parma, Italy, on 24 August 1769 for the wedding celebrations of Ferdinand, Duke of Parma and Archduchess Maria Amalia of Austria.

Styled a festa teatrale, Le feste d'Apollo consists of a prologue and three self-contained acts on the model of French opéra-ballet (the court of Parma was passionately interested in French culture). Gluck knew the Archduchess Maria Amalia well as she had sung in two of his operas, Il Parnaso confuso and La corona, in Vienna. The composer recycled a lot of music from his earlier operas in the score of Le feste. In fact, the whole of the third act, Orfeo, is a shorter reworking of his most famous piece, Orfeo ed Euridice (1762). The overture to the prologue is taken from Telemaco. Gluck later reused some of the choruses in two of the operas he wrote for Paris, Iphigénie en Aulide and Iphigénie en Tauride.

Gluck travelled to Parma to supervise rehearsals from February to April 1769. The wedding was delayed by the death of Pope Clement XIII and did not take place until 19 July. The celebrations, including the staging of Le feste, followed in August.

== The work ==
The prologue and three acts are as follows:

=== Prologue ===
The Italian libretto is by Carlo Gastone della Torre di Rezzonico (1742-1796). A group of young Athenian men and women, led by Anfrisio and Arcinia, gather to celebrate the festival of Apollo. The priest of Apollo reveals the god has sent him a vision which promises a flourishing future for the Duke of Parma and his bride.

Cast	Voice type	Conductor: Christoph Willibald von Gluck
Sacerdote d'Apollo (Priest of Apollo)	tenor	Gaetano Bernardino Ottani
Anfrisio	soprano castrato	Giuseppe Millico, "il Moscovita"
Arcinia	soprano	Lucrezia Agujari, "la Bastardella"
Chorus: Young Athenian men and women

=== Bauci e Filemone ===
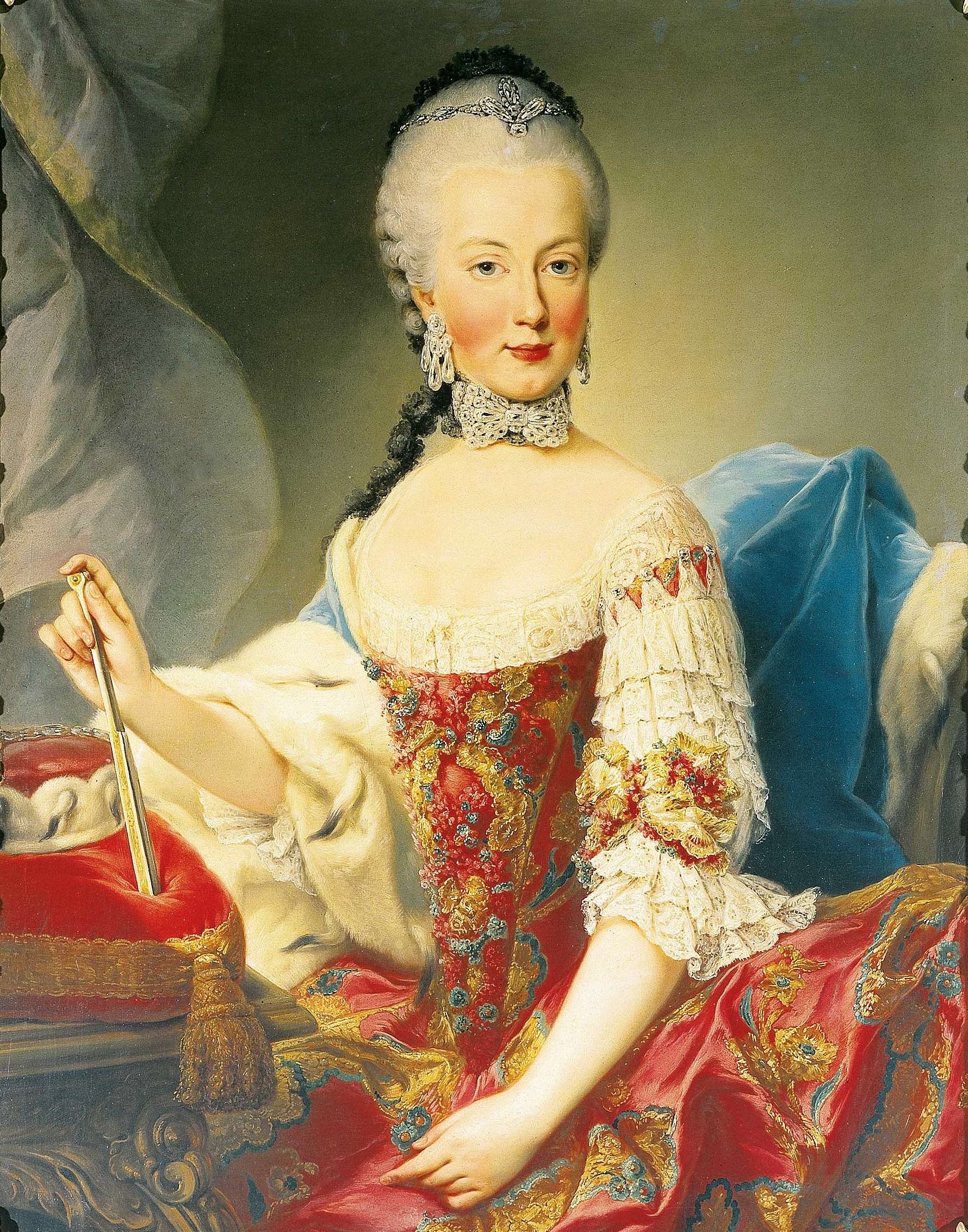
Maria Amalia, Duchess of Parma

The libretto, by Giuseppe Maria Pagnini (1737–1814), is based on the myth of Baucis and Philemon in Ovid's Metamorphoses. In Pagnini's version, Baucis and Philemon are not an old married couple but a pair of young lovers. The king of the gods, Jupiter, visits the world of mortals disguised as a traveller from Crete, intending to punish mankind for its wickedness. However, when he visits the countryside of Phrygia, Baucis and Philemon warmly welcome him to their cottages. Jupiter reveals his true identity and officiates at the wedding of the couple. He tells them they will live together as priests in his temple and when they die they will become demi-gods and protectors of the region.

Bauci's aria "Il mio pastor tu sei" in the third scene is notable for containing several top Gs - higher than Mozart's notoriously famous aria for the Queen of the Night.

Cast	Voice type	Conductor: Christoph Willibald von Gluck
Bauci (Baucis)	soprano	Lucrezia Agujari
Filemone (Philemon)	soprano castrato	Vincenzo Caselli
Giove (Jupiter)	tenor	Gaetano Bernardino Ottani
Una pastorella (A shepherdess)		
Chorus: Shepherds and shepherdesses

=== Aristeo ===
The libretto, by Giuseppe Pezzana (1735–1802), is loosely based on the myth of Aristaeus taken from Virgil's Georgics, Book Four. Aristaeus, the son of the nymph Cyrene, had been in love with Eurydice, the wife of Orpheus, but as he pursued her she had trodden on a snake and died from its venomous bite. To punish Aristaeus, the wood nymphs kill his bees and make him fall in love with the nymph Cydippe, who rejects his advances on the orders of Aristaeus's mother. Aristaeus visits Cyrene in despair and begs for her help. She tells him his sufferings are a result of what he has done to Orpheus and Eurydice and tells him to sacrifice to their shades and the wood nymphs. Aristaeus does so and the gods are appeased. New swarms of bees issue from the carcasses of bulls Aristaeus has slain and Cyrene gives Cydippe to Aristaeus in marriage.

This act includes a bravura aria which Gluck had originally composed for Il Parnaso confuso. This aria was later incorporated into Act 1 of Orphée et Euridice, the 1774 Paris revision of Orfeo ed Euridice, as "L'espoir renaît dans mon âme".

Cast	Voice type	Conductor: Christoph Willibald von Gluck
Aristeo (Aristaeus)	soprano castrato	Vincenzo Caselli
Ati	tenor	Gaetano Bernardino Ottani
Cirene (Cyrene)	soprano	Antonia Maria Girelli-Aguilar
Cidippe (Cydippe)	soprano	Felicita Suardi
Silvia, a wood nymph		
Chorus: Wood nymphs, Silvia's followers; nymphs of the River Peneus; inhabitants of Tempe

=== Orfeo ===
This is a reworking of Orfeo ed Euridice, which had first been performed in Vienna in 1762, with a libretto by Ranieri de' Calzabigi.

Cast	Voice type	Conductor: Christoph Willibald von Gluck
Orfeo (Orpheus)	soprano castrato	Giuseppe Millico
Euridice (Eurydice)	soprano	Antonia Maria Girelli-Aguilar
Amore (Cupid)	soprano (en travesti)	Felicita Suardi

== Recording ==
- Christophe Rousset and his ensemble Les Talens Lyriques recorded two of the acts (Aristeo and Filemone e Bauci) under the title Philémon et Baucis (Ambroisie, 2006)
