= La corona (Gluck) =

Opera by Christoph Willibald Gluck

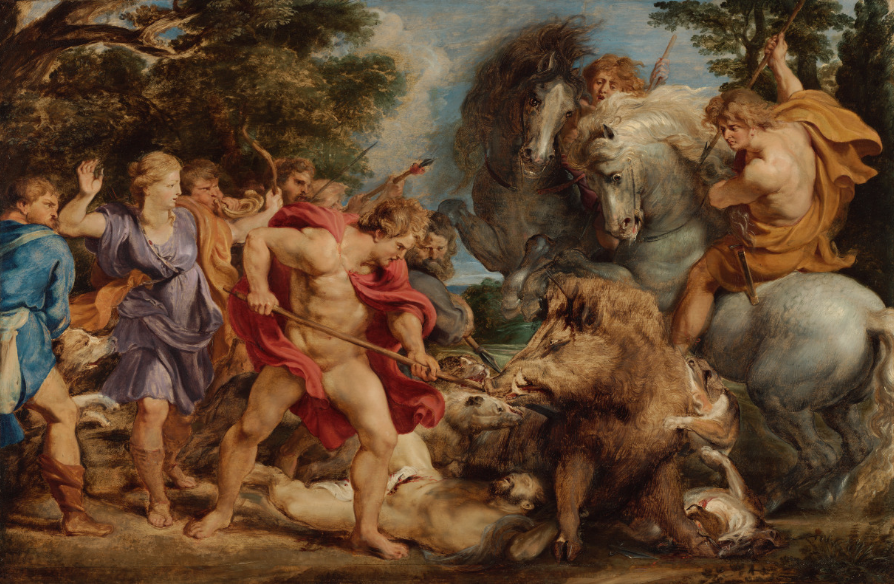
Rubens's depiction of Meleager killing the Calydonian boar, the central point of the opera. Meleager's beloved, the huntress Atalanta, stands behind him, bow in hand.

La corona (The Crown) is an opera by the composer Christoph Willibald Gluck. It takes the form of an azione teatrale in one act. The Italian-language libretto is by Pietro Metastasio. The opera was intended to celebrate the name day of Emperor Francis I on 4 October 1765 but the Emperor died in August and it remained unperformed until the 20th century. It was written for the four archduchess daughters of the Emperor, like Gluck's Il Parnaso confuso, which premiered earlier that year at Schönbrunn Palace in Vienna.

== Roles ==
Cast	Voice type	Cast of the cancelled premiere
Atalanta	soprano	Archduchess Maria Amalia of Austria
Meleagro (Meleager)	soprano (en travesti)	Archduchess Maria Elisabeth of Austria
Climene	soprano	Archduchess Maria Josepha of Austria
Asteria	soprano	Archduchess Maria Carolina of Austria

== Synopsis ==
Princess Atalanta decides to help the inhabitants of Kalydon to be free from the Calydonian wild boar that haunts the city. However, she hesitates as her sister and a friend want to come along. Prince Meleagro does not want women to be exposed to danger. Atalanta enters the forest and wounds the wild boar so that Meleagro can kill it. He gives her the credit but she insists on his having it. In the end, they decide to give the honour to the hunting goddess Diana.

== Performance history ==
The first ever performance of the opera was a concert performance as part of the City of London Festival in July 1987, the bicentenary of Gluck's death.

The first staged performance was in November 1987, in the Schönbrunn Palace in Vienna as part of an international conference about Gluck. The orchestra was Concilium musicum Wien.

A concert performance was given by the Queen's Chamber Band at Merkin Hall in New York on 25 January 2005. This was said to be a New York première. (See also "Recordings" below.)

The opera was performed at Universität Mozarteum in Salzburg in 2014. The orchestra was conducted by Josef Wallnig.

A concert performance by Bampton Classical Opera in London was scheduled for November 2020, but has been postponed to spring 2021. (See also "Recordings" below.)

Staged performances with orchestra were given by the Pacific Opera Project in Camarillo, California, about an hour's drive from Los Angeles, on 20 and 21 November 2020. These were drive-in performances. The Project claims that these performances were the first staged performances of the opera in the US. The opera was performed in a double bill with Il Parnaso confuso, also by Gluck. (See also "Recordings" below.)

== Recordings ==
- La corona Bavarian Radio Chorus, Warsaw Chamber Orchestra, conducted by Tomasz Bugaj (Orfeo, 1988)
- La corona The Queen's Chamber Band, conducted by Rudolph Palmer (Albany Records, 2005) with Julianne Baird in the role of Atalanta
- A video showing soprano Harriet Eyley (Meleagro) and conductor Robert Howarth work on arias from the opera for the Bampton Classical Opera production is on YouTube.
- A recording of the Pacific Opera Project production is on YouTube.

== Sources ==
- Holden, Amanda The Viking Opera Guide (Viking, 1993), page 378.
- Gluck Gesamtausgabe La corona
