= Il gran Tamerlano =

Opera by Josef Mysliveček

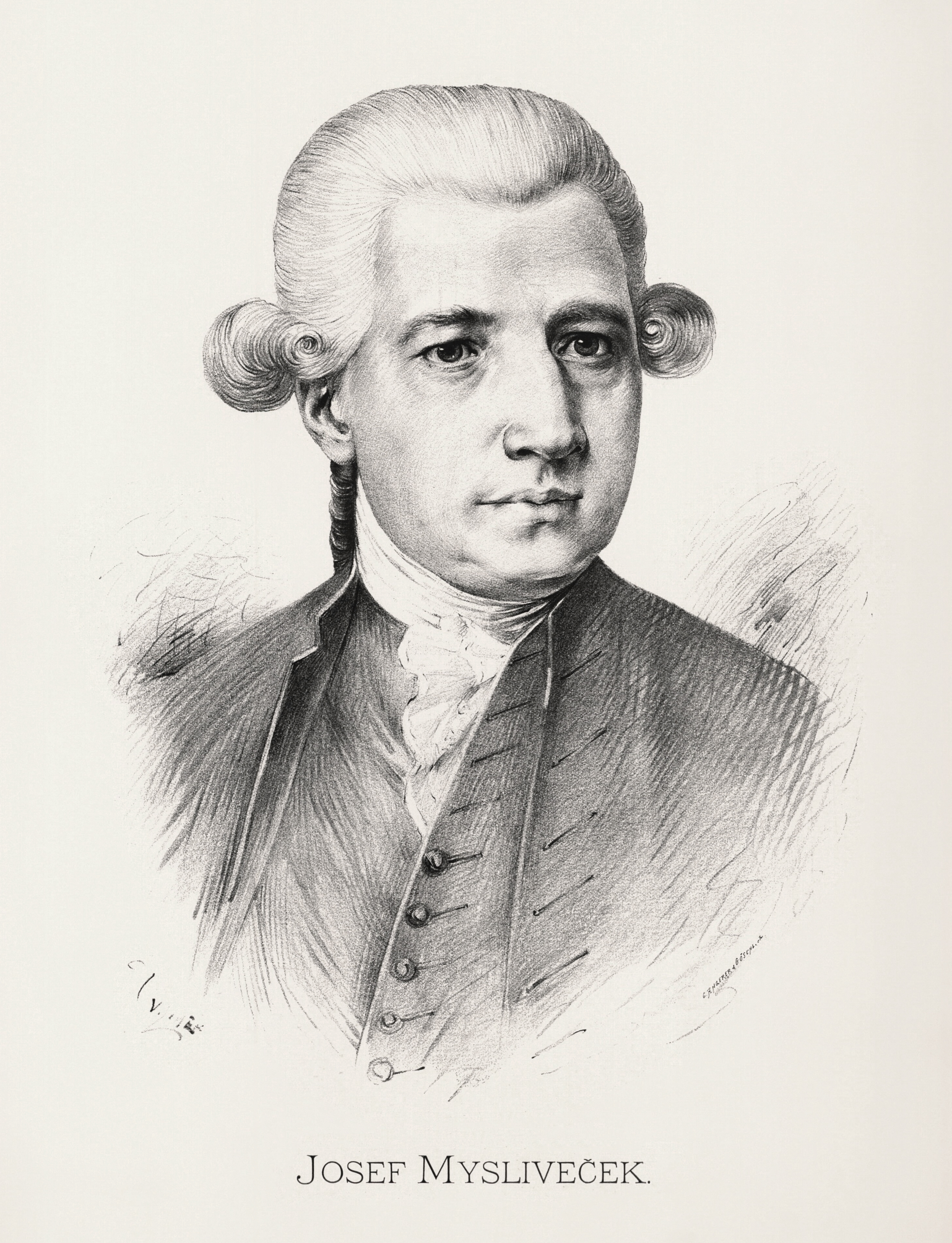
Josef Mysliveček

Il gran Tamerlano ("The Great Tamerlane") is an opera in three acts by the Czech composer Josef Mysliveček. Its libretto is a reworking of a text by Agostino Piovene first set by Giovanni Battista Lampugnani for Milan in 1746. All of Mysliveček's operas are of the serious type in Italian referred to as opera seria that would usually feature the designation dramma per musica in librettos. Generally, this style favored high vocal ranges, both for male and female singers, but for the character of Bajazette, emperor of the Turks, the composer created the only substantial role for a bass singer that appears in any of his operas.

== Performance history ==
The opera was first performed at the Regio-Ducal Teatro in Milan on 26 December 1771 (that is, the first day of the operatic carnival season of 1772). It was very successful when it appeared, indeed one of the most popular operas performed in Milan in its day. A number of vocal pieces from the opera were frequently copied in late eighteenth-century vocal collections, for example the magnificent duet "Di quel amabil ciglio" and the aria "Il caro e solo oggetto." Il gran Tamerlano was revived in Pavia in 1776. The musicologist Daniel E. Freeman has recently demonstrated the remarkable resemblance of the opening of the overture to Il gran Tamerlano and the opening of Mozart's Symphony No. 9, K. 73. Mysliveček visited the Mozarts frequently during all three of their trips to Italy in the early 1770s, and it is likely that Mozart knew the overture from his contacts with Mysliveček at that time.

Mysliveček's Il gran Tamerlano was revived in 2026 at the Josef Kajetán Tyl Theatre in Plzeň, Czech Republic, in a performance conducted by Jiří Petrdlík and Vojtěch Spurný. Earlier, in 1967, the opera was performed as part of a musicological conference in Brno in the former Czechoslovakia that was a part of a first era of the modern revival of the composer's operas. An abbreviated version of that production was given in Prague in 1977.

== Roles ==
Role	Voice type	Premiere cast, 26 December 1771, Regio-Ducal Teatro, Milan
Tamerlano, Emperor of the Tartars	soprano castrato	Giuseppe Millico
Bajazette, Emperor of the Turks	bass	Giovanni Battista Zonca
Asteria, daughter of Bajazette	soprano	Antonia Maria Girelli Aguilar
Andronico, a Greek prince	alto castrato	Giuseppe Cicognani
Irene, Princess of Trabisonda	soprano	Anna Boselli
Idaspe, one of Tamerlano's generals	alto (in a breeches role)	Rosa Polidora

== Synopsis ==
Eighteenth-century Italian operas in serious style are almost always set in a distant or legendary past and are built around historical, pseudo-historical, or mythological characters. The story of Il gran Tamerlano is based on events surrounding the Battle of Ankara of 1402, fought between the forces of the Ottoman sultan Bayezid I and the Turco-Mongol ruler Timur, who is known in English-speaking countries as Tamerlane. The result was an extraordinary military victory for Timur, who actually succeeded in capturing the Ottoman sultan. This is what made the story so attractive for treatment as an opera libretto in eighteenth-century, since stories of rulers who were captured in battle were common. In order to provide the obligatory element of a love story, the librettist Piovene concocted the character of Asteria, a daughter of the Ottoman sultan who is captured along with him and engages in love intrigues with members of Tamerlane's court. A setting in the fifteenth-century would have been rather late for an opera libretto of Mysliveček's day, but the venue in central Asia, rather than in Europe, is what preserves the sense of a serious opera in Italian having to take place in a distant location either chronologically or geographically.

=== Act 1 ===
After capturing the Ottoman sultan Bajazette and his daughter Asteria, Tamerlano falls in love with Asteria, who has no interest in him. Asteria is rather love with the Greek commander Andronico. Tamerlano has the idea of offering Andronico his own kingdom and the hand of his current betrothed, Irene, if he can persuade Bajazette to give his permission to allow him to marry his daughter Asteria. For her part, Irene is shocked at Tamerlano's behavior, and vows to attempt to regain his love. Tamerlano, completely infatuated with Asteria, pressures Baiazette more and more to give his permission to marry Asteria, to the point where he is threatened with death. Asteria has the idea of pretending to be in love with Tamerlano in order to save her father's life.

=== Act 2 ===
Bajazette is determined not to see his daughter married to Tamerlano, no matter what the penalty. Tamerlano threatens Bajazette with death again, and Asteria does agree to him to spare her father. Asteria intends to kill Tamerlano to prevent the wedding. Tamerlano learns of this and seeks revenge.

=== Act 3 ===
Tamerlano seeks to humiliate Asteria by forcing her to work as a maid in his work as Baiazette watches her. Asteria tries to poison Tamerlano when she serves him a glass, but Irene, earlier disguised, saves his life. Tamerlano reflects on the obvious love between Asteria and Adronico, and permits them to marry. He decides to take Irene back as his betrothed. Bajezette, weary of life and humiliated by his defeat at the Battle of Ankara, poisons himself with the same poison intended for Tamerlano.

== Vocal set pieces ==
Act 1, scene 1 - Aria of Bajazette, "Superbo di mia sorte"
Act 1, scene 4 - Aria of Tamerlano, "Vanne la sorte mia"
Act 1, scene 5 - Aria of Andronico, "Chi non ode i miei sospiri"
Act 1, scene 7 - Aria of Tamerlano, "Che per voi sospiro"
Act 1, scene 10 - Aria of Asteria, "Sento nell'alma mia"
Act 1, scene 13 - Aria of Irene, "Tradito ed appresso"
Act 1, scene 14 - Chorus, "Già ti cede il mondo intero"
Act 1, scene 15 - Duet of Tamerlano and Asteria, "Di quel amabil ciglio"

Act 2, scene 2 - Aria of Bajazette, "In mezzo alle tempeste"
Act 2, scene 4 - Aria of Andronico, "Se ti mirre se quest'alma"
Act 2, scene 5 - Aria of Bajazette, "Sazia il tuo fiero orgoglio"
Act 2, scene 6 - Aria of Asteria, "Cadrò, sì cada, io stessa"
Act 2, scene 8 - Aria of Irene, "Quell'empio cor istabile"
Act 2, scene 9 - Aria of Tamerlano, "Il caro e solo oggetto"
Act 2, scene 10 - Aria of Idaspe, "Fra il mar turbato, e nero"
Act 2, scene 11 - Aria of Asteria, "Nacqui in seno alla sventura"
Act 2, scene 12 - Chorus, "Lieti sposi, ah venga Imene"
Act 2, scene 13 - Quartet for Tamerlano, Bajazette, Asteria, and Andronico, "Smanio, veneggio e fremo"

Act 3, scene 2 - Aria of Bajazette, "Pria di salir"
Act 3, scene 4 - Aria of Tamerlano, "M'offende il nemico"
Act 3, scene 7 - Aria of Asteria, "Non mi vedo"
Act 3, scene 9 - Chorus, "Doppo il nembo e la procella"

== Recordings ==
Three vocal excerpts drawn from the role of Baiazette are included in the collection Karel Berman: Operatic Recital, Czech Radio CR04372 (2009), Karel Berman, bass.
