= Archduchess Maria Josepha of Austria (1751–1767) =

Austrian archduchess (1751–1767)

Maria Josepha of Austria
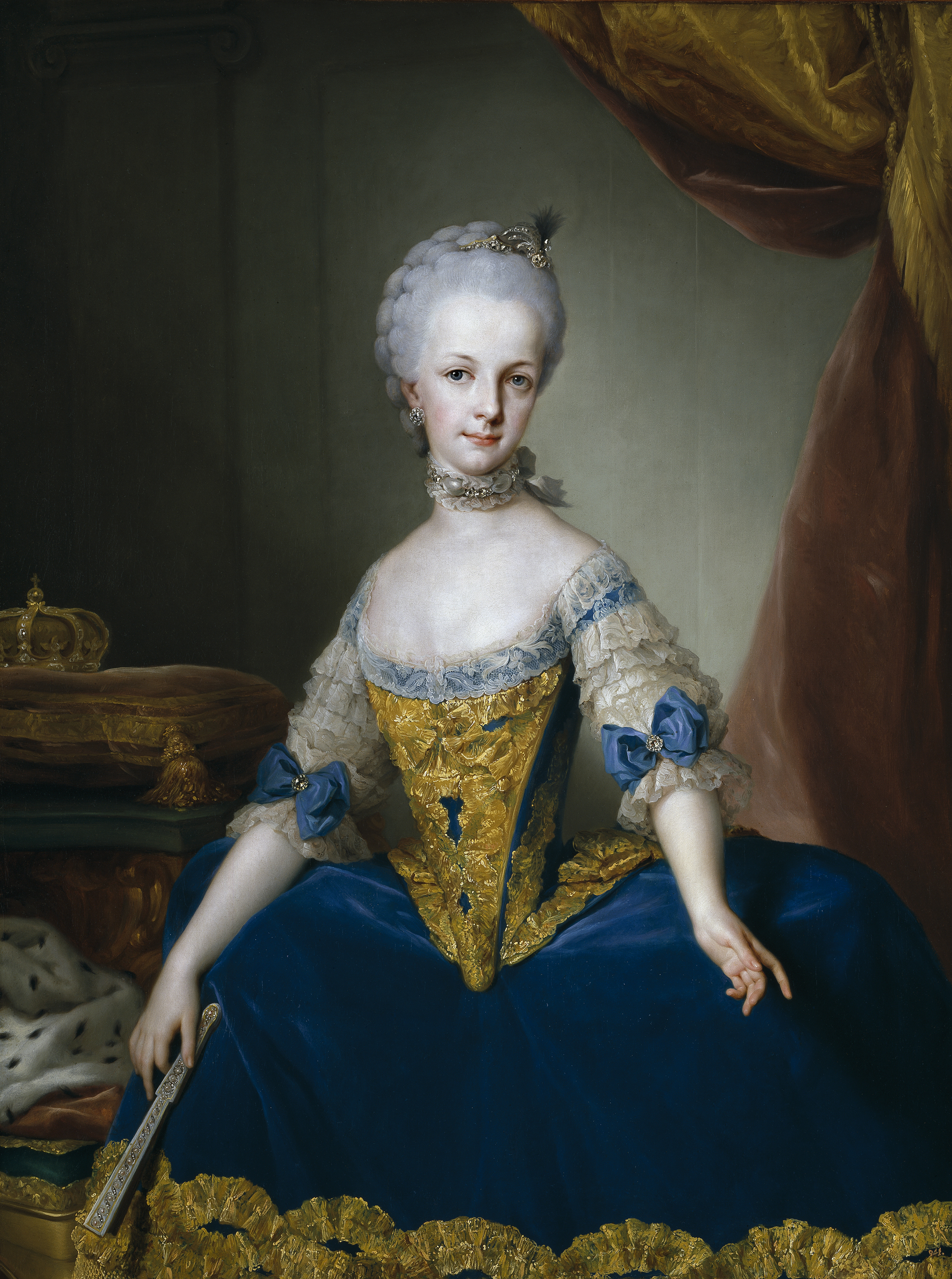
- Portrait by Anton Raphael Mengs, 1767
- Born: 19 March 1751; Hofburg Palace, Vienna, Archduchy of Austria, Holy Roman Empire
- Died: 15 October 1767 (aged 16); Schönbrunn Palace, Vienna, Holy Roman Empire
- Burial: Imperial Crypt, Kaisergruft, Vienna
Names
- English: Mary Josepha Gabriella Joan Antonia Anne of Austria; German: Maria Josefa Gabriele Johanna Antonia Anna von Österreich; French: Marie Josèphe Gabrielle Jeanne Antoinette Anne d'Autriche
- House: Habsburg-Lorraine
- Father: Francis I, Holy Roman Emperor
- Mother: Maria Theresa

Archduchess Maria Josepha of Austria (Maria Josefa Gabriella Johanna Antonia Anna; 19 March 1751 – 15 October 1767) was the twelfth child and ninth daughter of Francis I, Holy Roman Emperor, and Empress Maria Theresa. She was engaged to King Ferdinand IV of Naples and Sicily, but the marriage never materialised due to Maria Josepha's death from smallpox. She was buried in the Imperial Crypt in Vienna, Austria.

== Early life ==
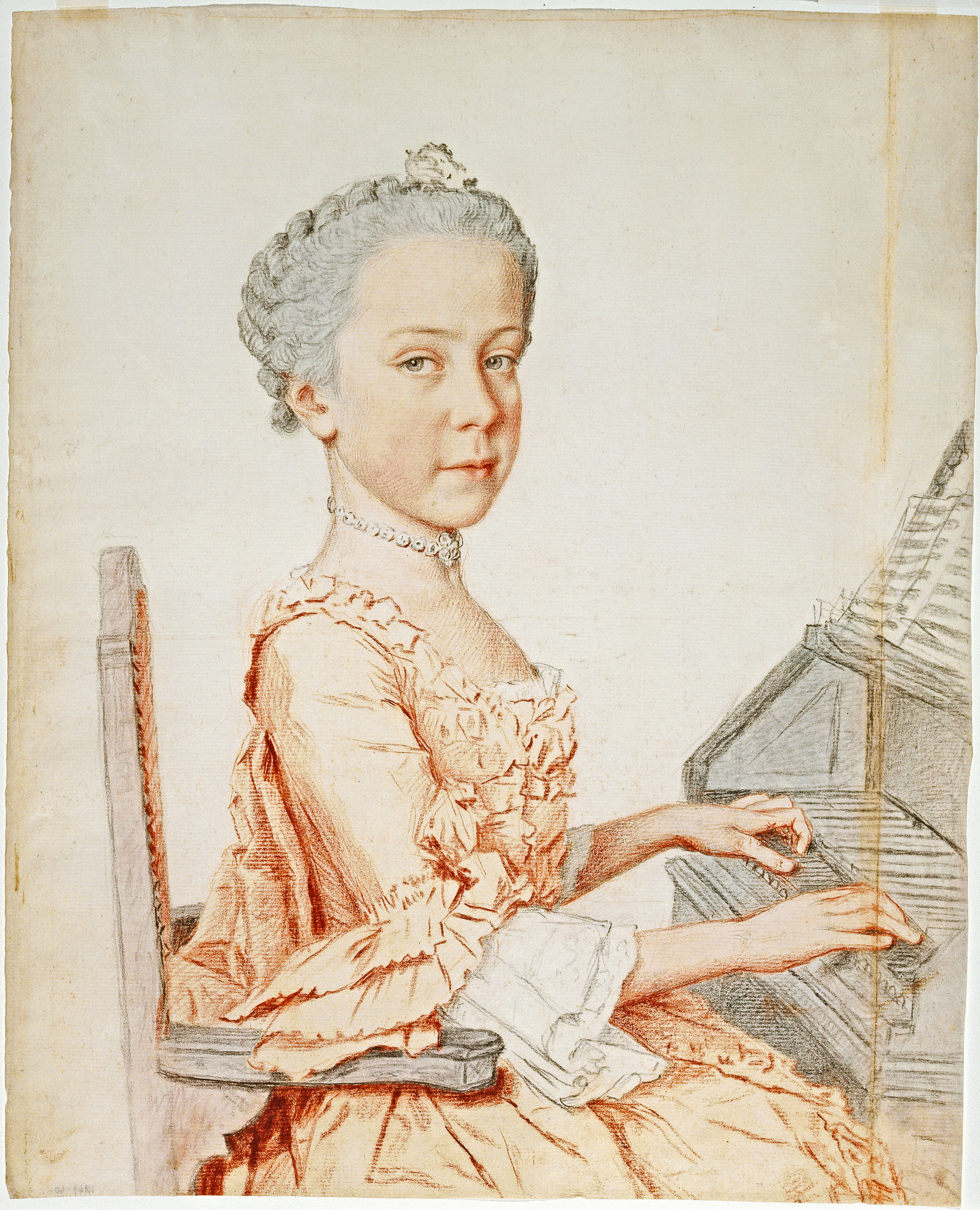
Maria Josepha seated at the harpsichord in 1762 (watercolor by Liotard)

Maria Josepha was born on 19 March 1751 at the Hofburg Palace in Vienna, Austria, as the ninth daughter and twelfth child of Francis I, Holy Roman Emperor and Empress Maria Theresa. By birth, she was entitled to the position of Archduchess of Austria, as her sisters were. Four more siblings followed her birth: Maria Carolina (1752), Ferdinand Karl (1754), Maria Antonia (1755), and Maximillian Francis (1756).

Alongside her other siblings, Maria Josepha lived in the Hofburg Palace during the winter. During the summer, her family resided in both the Schönbrunn Palace and in the Laxenburg castle complex. Maria Josepha was raised in the Kindskammer with her many siblings. Her overall education was taken care of by the governess Countess Lerchenfeld, who also took care of Maria Josepha's sister Maria Johanna, with whom Maria Josepha enjoyed a very close relationship. Maria Josepha was also the favourite sibling of her brother, Archduke Joseph.

Maria Johanna was born only a year before Maria Josepha, in February 1750. The two sisters were raised and educated together, and had the same tutors. Maria Josepha and Maria Johanna "developed satisfactory, worked hard at their lessons and were involved in numerous festivities in which they participated enthusiastically."

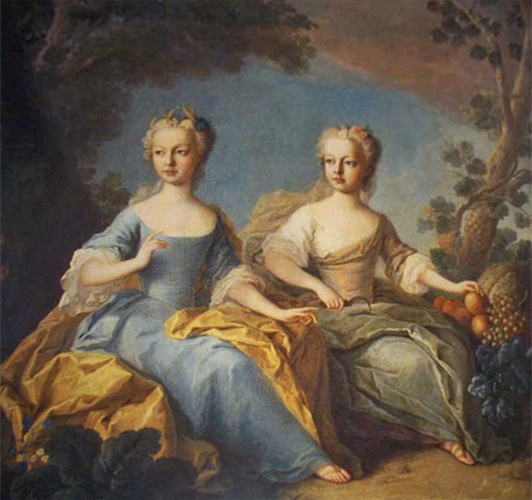
Painting of Maria Josepha (right) and her favourite sister Maria Johanna (left) in 1759

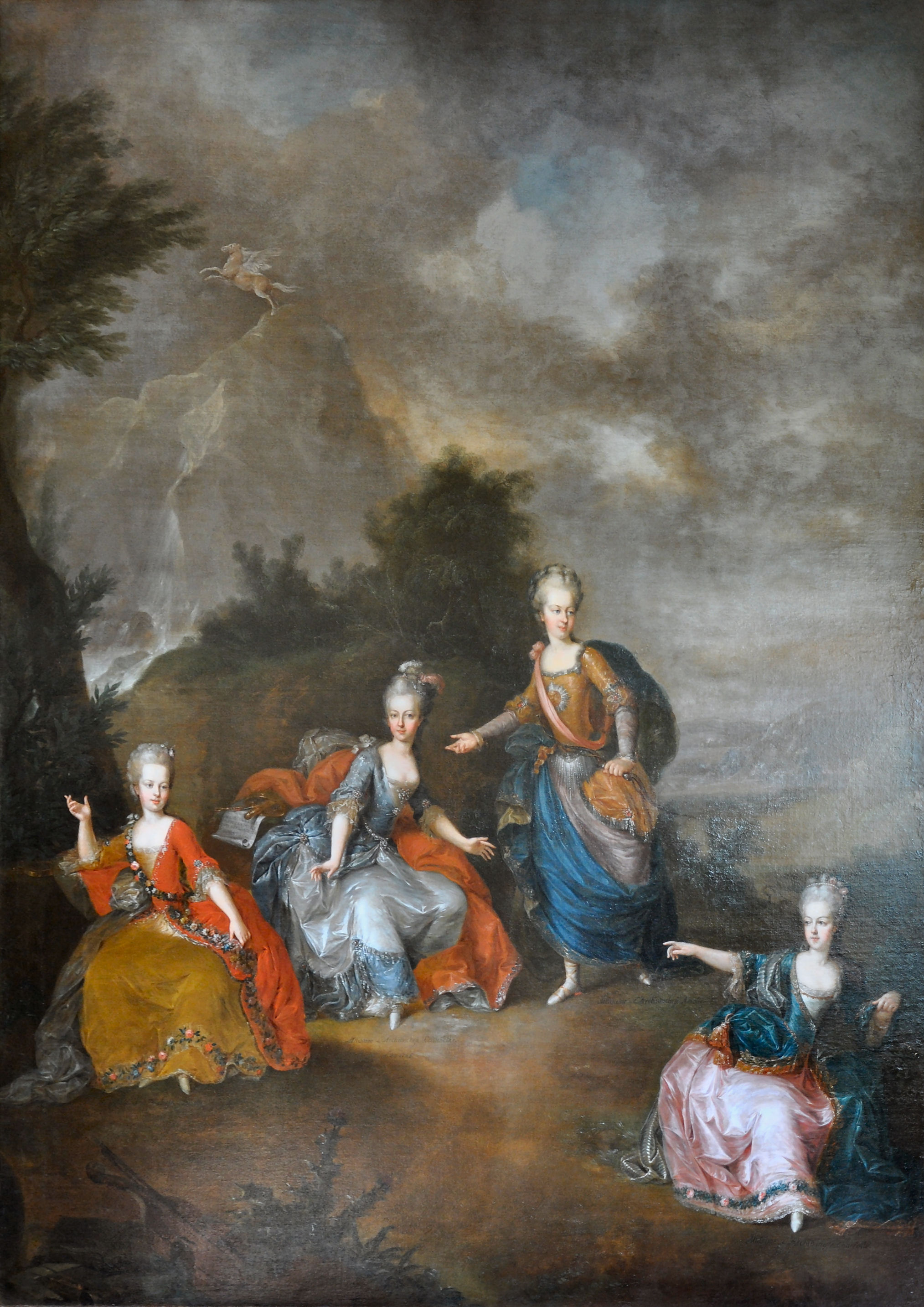
Painting of Maria Josepha and her sisters Maria Elisabeth, Maria Amalia and Maria Carolina performing in Il Parnaso confuso. Maria Josepha is Euterpe, while Maria Elisabeth is Melpomene, Maria Amalia is Apollo, and Maria Carolina is Erato

Maria Josepha and her siblings were taught history, geography, theology, land surveying, and mathematics, with "a scant hour or two devoted to studying maps and reading stories." They were taught the languages English, German, French, Italian, Latin, Spanish, and Greek. Maria Josepha, similar to that of her sister Maria Johanna, liked to act.

After the death of her sister-in-law Princess Isabella of Parma, Maria Josepha was the most important woman at court after her mother, niece and sister. She lost that position during May 1767 when her elder brother, Archduke Joseph, married his second cousin Maria Josepha of Bavaria.

== Betrothal ==
Empress Maria Theresa wanted her fourth eldest surviving daughter, Archduchess Maria Amalia, to marry King Ferdinand of Naples and Sicily for political reasons; however, after Ferdinand's father Charles III of Spain objected to the five-year age difference, Maria Josepha, as the next eldest daughter, was left as the next candidate for Ferdinand's hand in marriage. She and Ferdinand were the same age, and Maria Josepha was considered "delightfully pretty, pliant by nature."

Thus began Maria Josepha's training for her future role as Queen consort of Naples. Countess Lerchenfeld would instruct her for her "political sacrifice." Maria Theresa wrote to the countess about Maria Josepha's education:

It will give definiteness to your efforts to instil into my daughter the virtues and habits which will be essential to her if she is to find her happiness at the Court of Naples, or at least to escape perdition. Above all things, seek to kindle in her a spirit of devotion. She has given little evidence of it so far. Impress upon her that, in this world, prayer is the chief source of strength and consolation. She should not be ashamed of being seen at prayer. She is apt to be self-willed, which is undesirable.

Maria Theresa continued about her daughter's personality:

She is also extremely reserved. In moderation this can do no harm in Naples, but at the same time she must learn to be lively and conciliatory, and able to depend on herself for entertainment. In default of more pressing duty she should resort to reading, painting, and music. Idleness is the poison of life.

Maria Josepha's favourite sister, Maria Johanna, had been chosen as bride for the young king of Naples, however, she died before the marriage could take place.

== Death ==
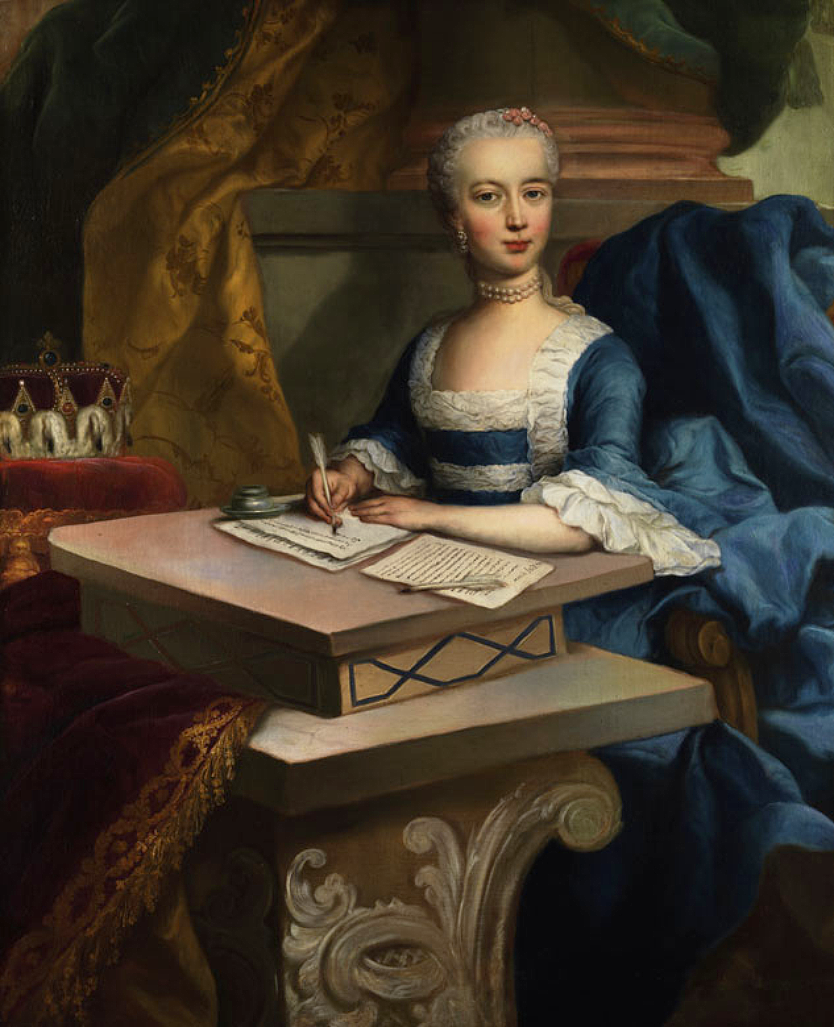
Portrait of Maria Josepha (circle of Martin van Meytens, 18th-century)

Maria Josepha had been terrified of dying of smallpox ever since the death of her elder sister Archduchess Maria Johanna Gabriela in 1762. Her fears were realised when she died of smallpox on the very day she was to have left Vienna for her journey across the Alps to marry Ferdinand. Popular belief holds that she contracted smallpox because her mother, Maria Theresa, insisted that she go and pray at the improperly sealed tomb of her sister-in-law, Empress Maria Josepha, who had recently died of the disease—because they shared the same name. However, the rash appeared two days after Maria Josepha visited the vault, and there is an incubation period of about one week after initial infection before symptoms of a rash appear. Therefore, the archduchess must have been infected before visiting the vault.

On 15 October 1767, at the age of 16, Maria Josepha, clinging to her brother Joseph, died due to the disease. She is buried in vault number 46 at the Imperial Crypt Vaults of the Imperial Crypt in Vienna. After her death, her younger sister, Archduchess Maria Carolina of Austria, was given as a bride to the king of Naples in her place.

Her death seems to have impacted her youngest sister, Maria Antonia. Maria Antonia, who married the future King Louis XVI of France in 1770, recalled a time when Maria Josepha, ill with smallpox, took her in her arms. Maria Josepha told her that she would be leaving her forever — not for Naples, but for the family crypt.

== Ancestry ==
Ancestors of Archduchess Maria Josepha of Austria (1751–1767)

16. Nicholas II, Duke of Lorraine
8. Charles V, Duke of Lorraine
17. Claude Françoise of Lorraine
4. Leopold, Duke of Lorraine
18. Ferdinand III, Holy Roman Emperor
9. Eleonore of Austria
19. Eleonora Gonzaga
2. Francis I, Holy Roman Emperor
20. Louis XIII of France
10. Philippe I, Duke of Orléans
21. Anne of Austria
5. Élisabeth Charlotte d'Orléans
22. Charles I Louis, Elector Palatine
11. Elisabeth Charlotte of the Palatinate
23. Princess Charlotte of Hesse-Kassel
1. Archduchess Maria Josepha of Austria
24. Ferdinand III, Holy Roman Emperor (= 18)
12. Leopold I, Holy Roman Emperor
25. Maria Anna of Austria
6. Charles VI, Holy Roman Emperor
26. Philip William, Elector Palatine
13. Eleonore Magdalene of Neuburg
27. Princess Elisabeth Amalie of Hesse-Darmstadt
3. Empress Maria Theresa
28. Anthony Ulrich, Duke of Brunswick-Wolfenbüttel
14. Louis Rudolph, Duke of Brunswick-Wolfenbüttel
29. Elisabeth Juliane of Schleswig-Holstein
7. Elisabeth Christine of Brunswick-Wolfenbüttel
30. Albert Ernst I, Prince of Oettingen-Oettingen
15. Christine Luise of Oettingen-Oettingen
31. Christine Friederike of Württemberg

== Bibliography ==
- Erickson, Carolly (2004). To the Scaffold: The Life of Marie Antoinette. Robson Books. ISBN 0-86051-818-3.
- Fraser, Antonia (2001). Marie Antoinette: The Journey. Anchor. pp. 28–29. ISBN 0-7538-1305-X.
- Iby, Elfriede (2009). Maria Theresa: Biography of a Monarch (1st ed.). Schloß Schönbrunn. ISBN 978-3-901568-57-2.
- Moffat, Mary Maxwell (1911). Maria Theresa. New York: E. P. Dutton and Company.
