= Giuseppe Aprile =

Italian castrato (1731-1813)

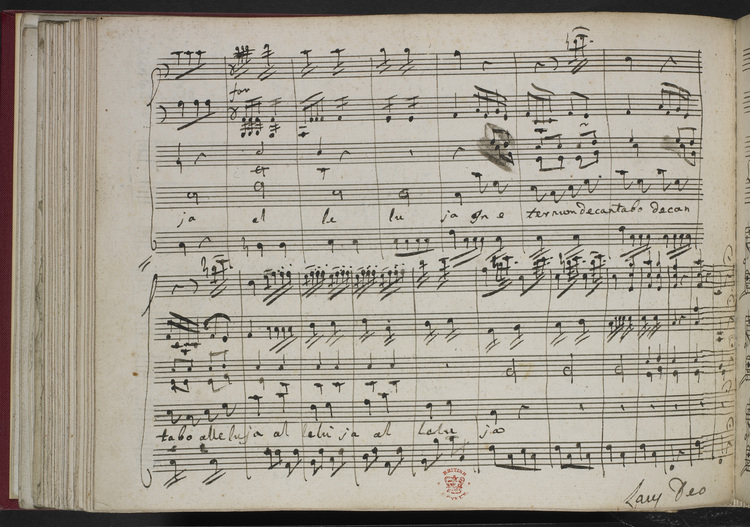
A page from the manuscript for Placide venti ameni by Giuseppe Aprile, written in his own hand.

Giuseppe Aprile (28 October 1731 – 11 January 1813) was an Italian castrato singer and music teacher. He was also known as 'Sciroletto' or 'Scirolino'.

Aprile was born in Martina Franca. After studying with Gregorio Sciroli, composer and singing instructor, in Naples, he began his singing career in 1752 at the Teatro San Carlo in Naples. He then began a great career, performing in prominent theatres throughout Italy, Germany, and even Madrid. His voice could reach E5. He withdrew from the stage in 1785 and became a singing instructor in Naples. Domenico Cimarosa, Michael Kelly and Emma, Lady Hamilton, were among his pupils. See: List of music students by teacher: A to B#Giuseppe Aprile. He wrote a popular book on singing instruction, The Italian Method of Singing, with 36 Solfeggi (1791).

== Operatic roles ==
- Euribate in Ifigenia in Aulide by Niccolò Jommelli and Tommaso Traetta (Naples, 1752)
- Edelberto in Ricimero re de' Goti by Baldassare Galuppi (Naples, 1753)
- Publio Cornelio Scipione in Livia Claudia Vestale by Niccolò Conforto (Rome, 1755)
- Pompeo in Pompeo magno in Armenia by Francesco Saverio Garzia (Rome, 1755)
- Cesare in Catone in Utica by Francesco Poncini (Parma, 1756)
- Giasone in Issipile by Baldassare Galuppi (Parma, 1756)
- Demetrio in the anonymous Antigono (Lucca, 1756)
- Timante in Demofoonte by Antonio Gaetano Pampani (Rome, 1757)
- Ezio in Ezio by Tommaso Traetta (Rome, 1757)
- Aminta in Il re pastore by Antonio Mazzoni (Bologna, 1757)
- Linceo in the anonymous Ipermestra (Venice, 1757)
- Enea in Didone abbandonata by Tommaso Traetta (Venice, 1757)
- Ciro in Ciro riconosciuto by Niccolò Jommelli (Mantua, 1758)
- Timante in Demofoonte by Tommaso Traetta (Mantua, 1758)
- Sesto in La clemenza di Tito by Giuseppe Scarlatti (Venice, 1760)
- Cosrovio in Gianguir by Vincenzo Ciampi (Venice, 1760)
- Castore in I tindaridi by Tommaso Traetta (Parma, 1760)
- Alceste in Demetrio by Baldassare Galuppi (Padua, 1761)
- Tiridate in Zenobia by Giovanni Battista Pescetti (Padua, 1761)
- Megacle in L'Olimpiade of Niccolò Jommelli (Stuttgart, 1761)
- Alceste in Demetrio by Giuseppe Ponzo (Turin, 1762)
- Achille in Ifigenia in Aulide by Ferdinando Bertoni (Turin, 1762)
- Enea in Didone abbadonata by Niccolò Jommelli (Stuttgart, 1763)
- Timante in Demofoonte by Niccolò Jommelli (Stuttgart, 1764)
- Motezuma in Motezuma by Gian Francesco de Majo (Turin, 1765)
- Megacle in L'Olimpiade by Johann Adolf Hasse (Turin, 1765)
- Aminta in Il re pastore by Niccolò Piccinni (Naples, 1765)
- Euriso in Creso by Antonio Sacchini (Naples, 1765)
- Teseo in the pasticcio Arianna e Teseo (Palermo, 1766)
- Fetonte in Fetonte by Niccolò Jommelli (Stuttgart, 1768)
- Gandarte in Nicoraste by Antonio Sacchini (Venice, 1769)
- Giulio Cesare in Cesare in Egitto by Niccolò Piccinni (Milan, 1770)
- Enea in Didone abbandonata by Ignazio Celoniat (Milan, 1770)
- Rinaldo in Armida abbandonata by Niccolò Jommelli (Naples, 1770; Florence, 1775)
- Demetrio in Antigono by Pasquale Cafaro (Naples, 1770)
- Timante in Demofoonte by Niccolò Jommelli (Naples, 1770)
- Eumene in Eumene by Gian Francesco de Majo (Naples, 1771)
- Perseo in Andromeda by Giuseppe Colla (Turin, 1772)
- Maometto in Tamas Kouli-Kan nell'Indie by Gaetano Pugnani (Turin, 1772)
- Sesto in La clemenza di Tito by Pasquale Anfossi (Naples, 1772)
- Achille in Achille in Sciro by Antonio Amicone (Naples, 1772)
- Titano in Cerere placata by Niccolò Jommelli (Naples, 1772)
- Linceo in Ipermestra by Niccolò Piccinni (Naples, 1772)
- Teseo in Arianna e Teseo by Giacomo Insanguine (Naples, 1773)
- Alceste in the pasticcio Demetrio (Florence, 1774)
- Maometto in Tamas Kouli-Kan nell'Indie by Pietro Guglielmi (Florence, 1774)
- Vologeso in Vologeso re de' Parti by Giovanni Marco Rutini (Florence, 1775)
- Marco Antonio in Cleopatra by Carlo Monza (Turin, 1776)
- Sicotenal in Sicotenal by Giovanni Marco Rutini (Turin, 1776)
- Telemaco in Calipso by Bernardino Ottani (Turin, 1777)
- Gengis-Kan in Gengis-Kan by Pasquale Anfossi (Turin, 1777)
- Euriso in Creso re di Lidia by Giovanni Battista Borghi (Florence, 1777)
- Enea in Enea nel Lazio by Antonio Burroni (Rome, 1778)
- Megacle in L'Olimpiade by Pasquale Anfossi (Rome, Perugia, and Treviso, 1778)
- Arsace in Medonte, re di Epiro by Giuseppe Sarti (Perugia, 1778; Florence, 1779)
- Cleomene in Erifile by Francesco Bianchi (Florence, 1779)
- Selimo in the pasticcio Il Solimano (Florence, 1779)
- Tarsile in La Calliroe by Josef Mysliveček (Pisa, 1779)
- Annio in the pasticcio Cajo Mario (Pisa, 1779)
- Annio in Cajo Mario by Domenico Cimarosa (Rome, 1780)
- Tito in Tito nelle Gallie by Pasquale Anfossi (Rome, 1780)

Source: Claudio Sartori. I libretti italiani a stampa dalle origini al 1800. Cuneo, 1992–1994.
