= Creso (Sacchini) =

- Opera seria by Antonio Sacchini
- Antonio Sacchini, engraved portrait
- Librettist: Gioacchino Pizzi
- Language: Italian
- Based on: Histories by Herodotos
- Premiere: 4 November 1765; Teatro San Carlo, Naples

Creso ('Croesus') is an opera seria in 3 acts with music by Antonio Sacchini, set to an Italian libretto by Gioacchino Pizzi after Book I of the Histories by Herodotos. The opera was first performed on 4 November 1765 at the Teatro San Carlo in Naples. The libretto was a popular one that had been first set by Niccolò Jommelli (Rome, 1757).

Creso was the most widely performed of Sacchini's opera serias, and much of the music displays the transition that the aria form of opera seria was undergoing. The standard aria dal segno form is interlaced with examples of abbreviated rondo form (ABAB) and through-composed ternary arias. Some of the music suggests themes from the works of the widely influential Tommaso Traetta.

== Roles ==
| Role | Voice type | Premiere Cast, 4 November 1765 (Conductor:) |
|---|---|---|
| Creso (Croesus) | tenor | Salvatore Casetti |
| Ariene, his daughter, | soprano | Maria Antonia Girelli-Aguilar |
| Euriso, Ariene's betrothed | soprano castrato | Giuseppe Aprile "Sciroletto" |
| Cratina | soprano | Francesca Gabrielli |
| Ciro | soprano castrato | Antonio Muzzio |
| Sibari | soprano castrato | Giuseppe Fabrizi |
