= Archduchess Johanna Gabriele of Austria =

Austrian archduchess (1750–1762)

Archduchess Johanna Gabriele
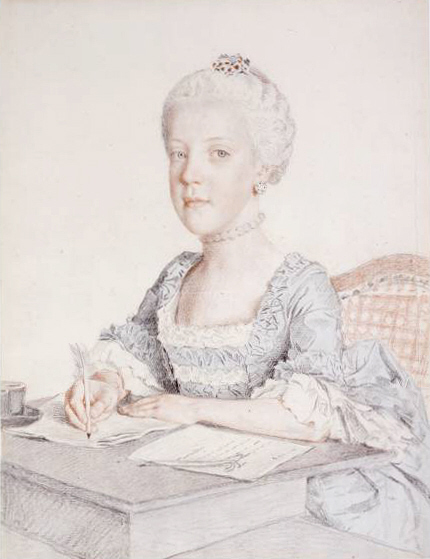
- Portrait by Jean-Étienne Liotard, 1762
- Born: 4 February 1750; Hofburg Palace, Vienna, Archduchy of Austria, Holy Roman Empire
- Died: 23 December 1762 (aged 12); Hofburg Palace, Vienna, Archduchy of Austria, Holy Roman Empire
- Burial: Imperial Crypt
Names
- German: Maria Johanna Gabriella Josepha Antonia; French: Marie Jeanne Gabrielle Josèphe Antoinette; English: Mary Joan Gabriella Josepha Antonia
- House: Habsburg-Lorraine
- Father: Francis I, Holy Roman Emperor
- Mother: Maria Theresa

Archduchess Johanna Gabriele of Austria (German: Maria Johanna Gabriele Josefa Antonia; 4 February 1750 – 23 December 1762) was an Archduchess of Austria as the eleventh child of Empress Maria Theresa and Francis I, Holy Roman Emperor. She was originally meant to marry Ferdinand I of the Two Sicilies, her second cousin; however, the marriage plans were never finalised due to Johanna Gabriele's death from smallpox.

== Childhood ==
Johanna Gabriele was born on 4 February 1750 at the Hofburg Palace in Vienna, Austria, as the eleventh child and eighth daughter of Francis I, Holy Roman Emperor and Empress Maria Theresa. She was raised in the Kindskammer with her many siblings, though she was particularly close with her sister Maria Josepha, who was born a year after Johanna Gabriele in 1751. The two were educated together and had the same tutors.

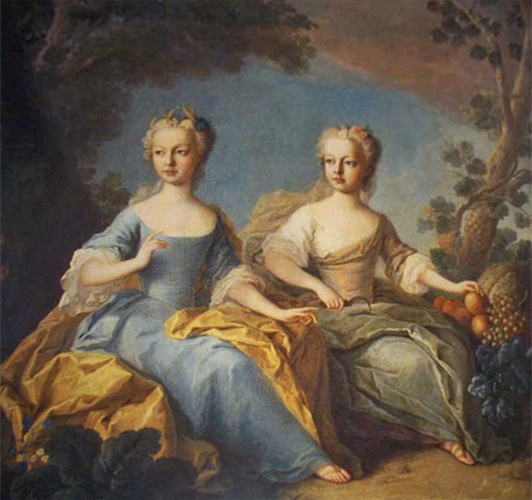
Portrait of Johanna Gabriele (left) and her favourite sister, Maria Josepha (right)

Johanna Gabriele strictly studied Latin, French, Italian, Greek, Spanish, German, English, history, geography, land surveying, mathematics, and theology—from the age of three. She was also taught how to dance and sing, and was known to have excelled at these subjects. She often gave musical performances, as she loved to sing. She also loved to act.

Additionally, Johanna Gabriele and her sisters were highly educated in dance and singing. While her brothers were taught to play different instruments, Johanna Gabriele and her sisters were given singing lessons. A special theatre was built at the Schönbrunn Palace, specially for the children; Johanna Gabriele and her siblings gave frequent musical performances. All in all, Johanna Gabriele and her sister Maria Josepha "developed satisfactory, worked hard at their lessons and were involved in numerous festivities in which they participated enthusiastically."

=== Betrothal ===
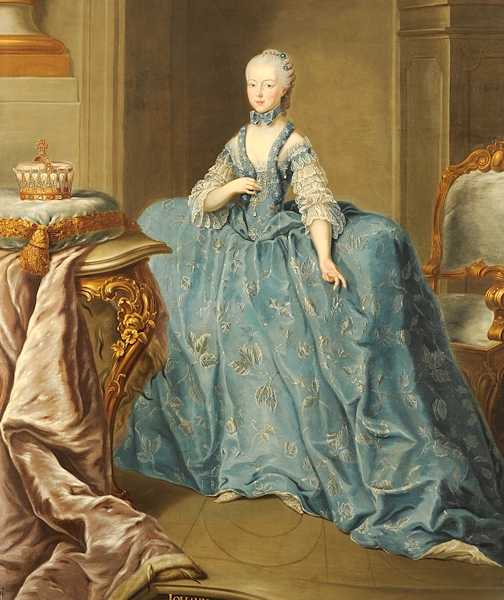
Portrait of Johanna Gabriele by Martin van Meytens, ca. 1760

Maria Theresa and King Charles III of Spain both agreed that Johanna Gabriele's sister, Maria Amalia, would marry Charles' son Ferdinand III, King of Sicily and IV of Naples, however, Charles later wanted to break off the engagement due to Maria Amalia being five years older than Ferdinand. Since Johanna Gabriele was just one year older than Ferdinand, she was betrothed to him instead.

== Death ==
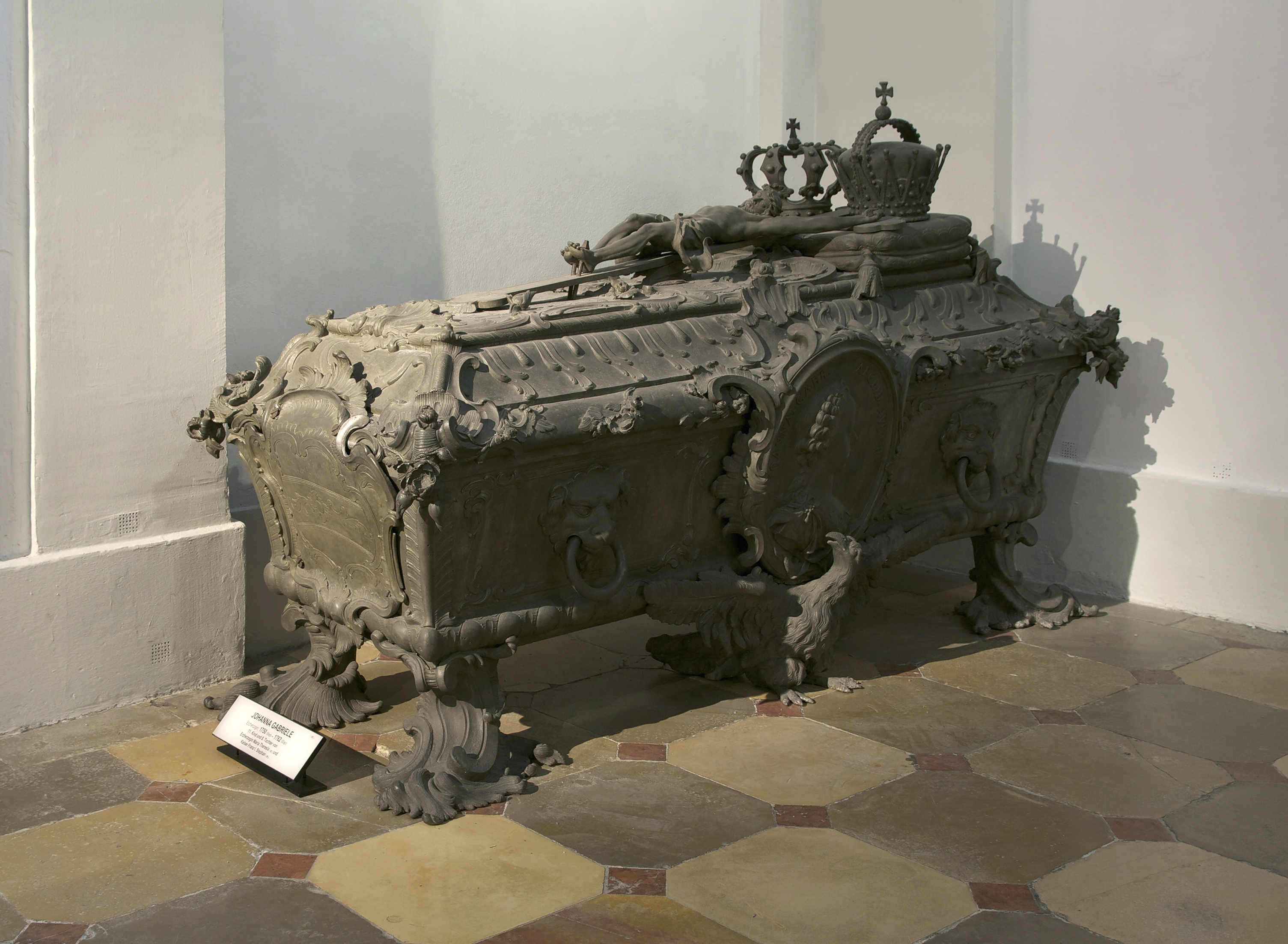
Johanna Gabriele's sarcophagus in the Imperial Crypt

In the second half of the eighteenth-century, smallpox was ravaging through the Holy Roman Empire. Leopold Mozart, father of Wolfgang Amadeus Mozart, wrote that "in the whole of Vienna, nothing was spoken of except smallpox. If 10 children were on the death register, 9 of them had died from smallpox." In December 1762, Johanna Gabriele caught the disease and died on 23 December; her painful death was described by her sister-in-law Isabella. Her mother, Maria Theresa, found comfort in the fact that before her death Johanna Gabriele made a complete confession of her sins to a Catholic priest. Maria Theresa wrote to Johanna Gabriele's sister, Maria Christina:

Your sister has confessed her sins for three-quarters of an hour, with a preciseness, repentance and devotion which brought her confessor to tears; since then, she is very weak. I cannot thank the loving God enough that he gives me this comfort; I give her completely into his hand and expect that her destiny cannot be anything than happy."

=== Aftermath ===
The loss of Johanna Gabriele to smallpox, along with that of other members of the family, contributed to Maria Theresa's decision to have the younger members of her family inoculated, and the subsequent acceptance of smallpox inoculation in Austria.
