= Antonia Maria Girelli =

Italian opera singer

- Born: c. 1730; Bologna
- Died: after 1773
- Other name: Maria Antonia Girelli Anguilar
- Occupation: Operatic soprano
- Years active: 1752–1773

Antonia Maria Girelli, also known as Maria Antonia Girelli Anguilar, (ca. 1730 – died after 1773), was an Italian operatic soprano.

== Biography ==
Antonia Maria Girelli was born in Bologna in c. 1730. She began her career as a dancer at the Teatro San Samuele in Venice in 1752; giving her first performances during Carnival in Ferdinando Bertoni Le pescatrici (lit. 'The fisherwomen') and Baldassare Galuppi's Le virtuose ridicole (lit. 'The virtuous ridiculous women'). She transitioned into work as a singer. Although the exact nature of her training as a musician is unknown, it is likely that she devoted the years 1752 to 1755 preparing for a career as a vocalist. She had a career as a soprano.

Girelli worked as a singer first in Florence in 1756-1757; making her professional debut at the Teatro della Pergola as Timagene in Galuppi's Alessandro nell'Indie (1756). In 1759 she performed at the Teatro San Angelo in Venice. She sang leading roles in Prague at the Divadlo v Kotcích; performing there in 1760–1761 and again in 1764-1765. In Prague her repertoire included Giuseppe Scarlatti's Adriano in Siria (1760).

In 1763 Girelli performed in the premiere of Gluck's Il trionfo di Clelia at the Teatro Comunale di Bologna. In 1765 she portrayed Ariene in the premiere of Antonio Sacchini's Creso at the Teatro di San Carlo in Naples. In 1769, she sang Euridice in the first performance in Italy of Gluck's Orfeo ed Euridice. It was performed as one part of the Le feste d'Apollo; a collection of works staged in celebration of the wedding of Ferdinand, Duke of Parma and Archduchess Maria Amalia of Austria.

In 1771 Girelli created roles in the world premieres of multiple operas at the Teatro Regio Ducale in Milan, including the part of the nymph Silvia in Mozart's Ascanio in Alba and the role of Asteria in Josef Mysliveček's Il gran Tamerlano. In 1772-1773 she was committed to the King's Theatre, London where she performed in operas by Gluck, Sacchini, Tommaso Giordani, Gaetano Pugnani, and Mattia Vento. Charles Burney criticized her singing in London, describing her intonation as "frequently false". She died sometime after 1773.
