= Archduchess Maria Elisabeth of Austria (born 1743) =

Austrian archduchess and abbess (1743–1808)

Maria Elisabeth of Austria
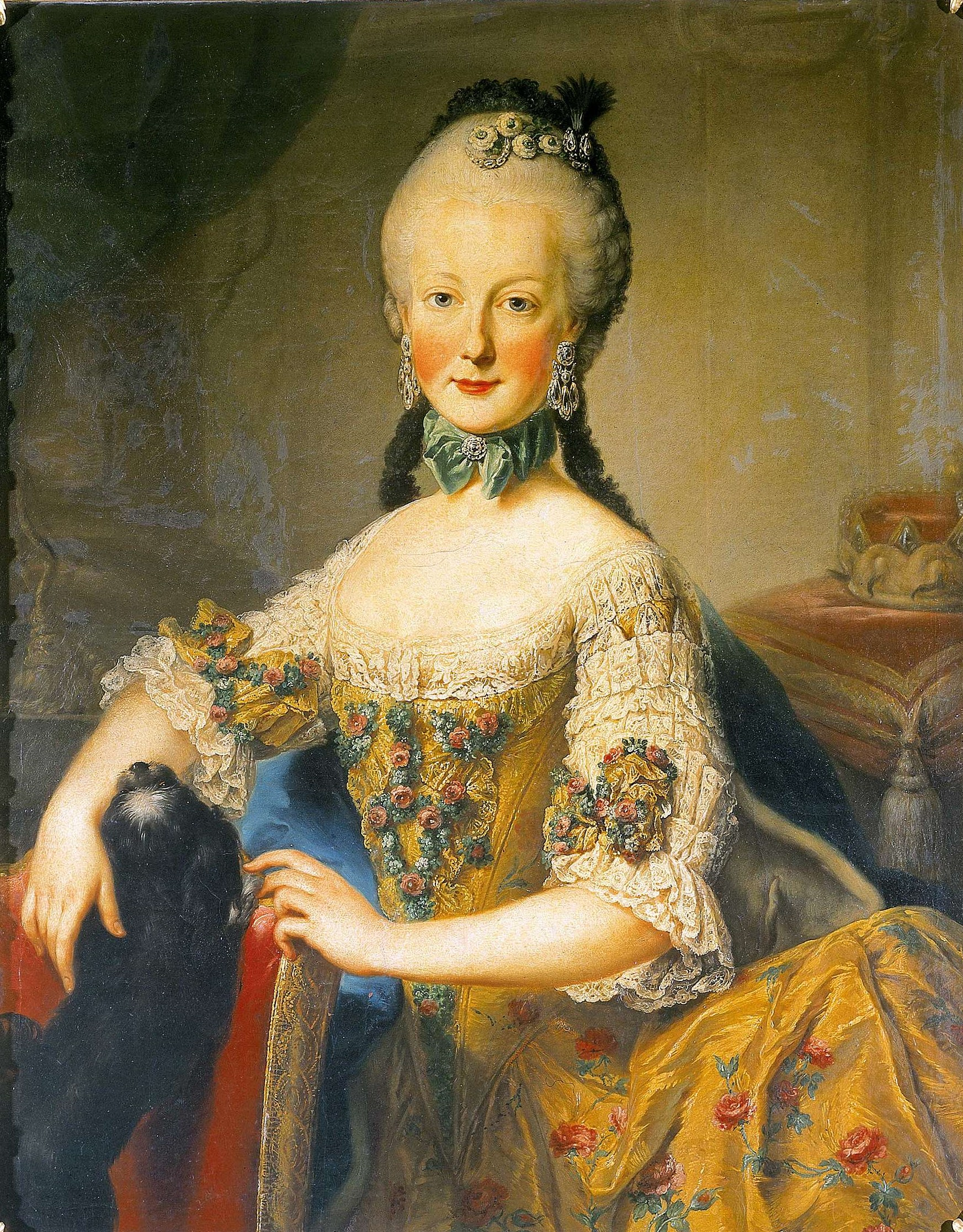
- Portrait by Martin van Meytens, 18th-century
- Born: 13 August 1743; Schönbrunn Palace, Vienna, Archduchy of Austria, Holy Roman Empire
- Died: 22 September 1808 (aged 65); Linzer Palace, Linz, Austrian Empire
- Burial: Old Cathedral, Linz
Names
- German: Maria Elisabeth Josefa Johanna Antonia; French: Marie Élisabeth Joséphine Jeanne Antoinette
- House: Habsburg-Lorraine
- Father: Francis I, Holy Roman Emperor
- Mother: Maria Theresa
- Religion: Roman Catholic

Maria Elisabeth of Austria (German: Maria Elisabeth Josefa Johanna Antonia; 13 August 1743 – 22 September 1808) was an archduchess of Austria and princess of Tuscany, Bohemia, and Hungary as the daughter of Empress Maria Theresa and Emperor Francis I. She was an abbess of the Theresian Institution of Noble Ladies in Innsbruck from 1780 until 1806.

== Early life ==
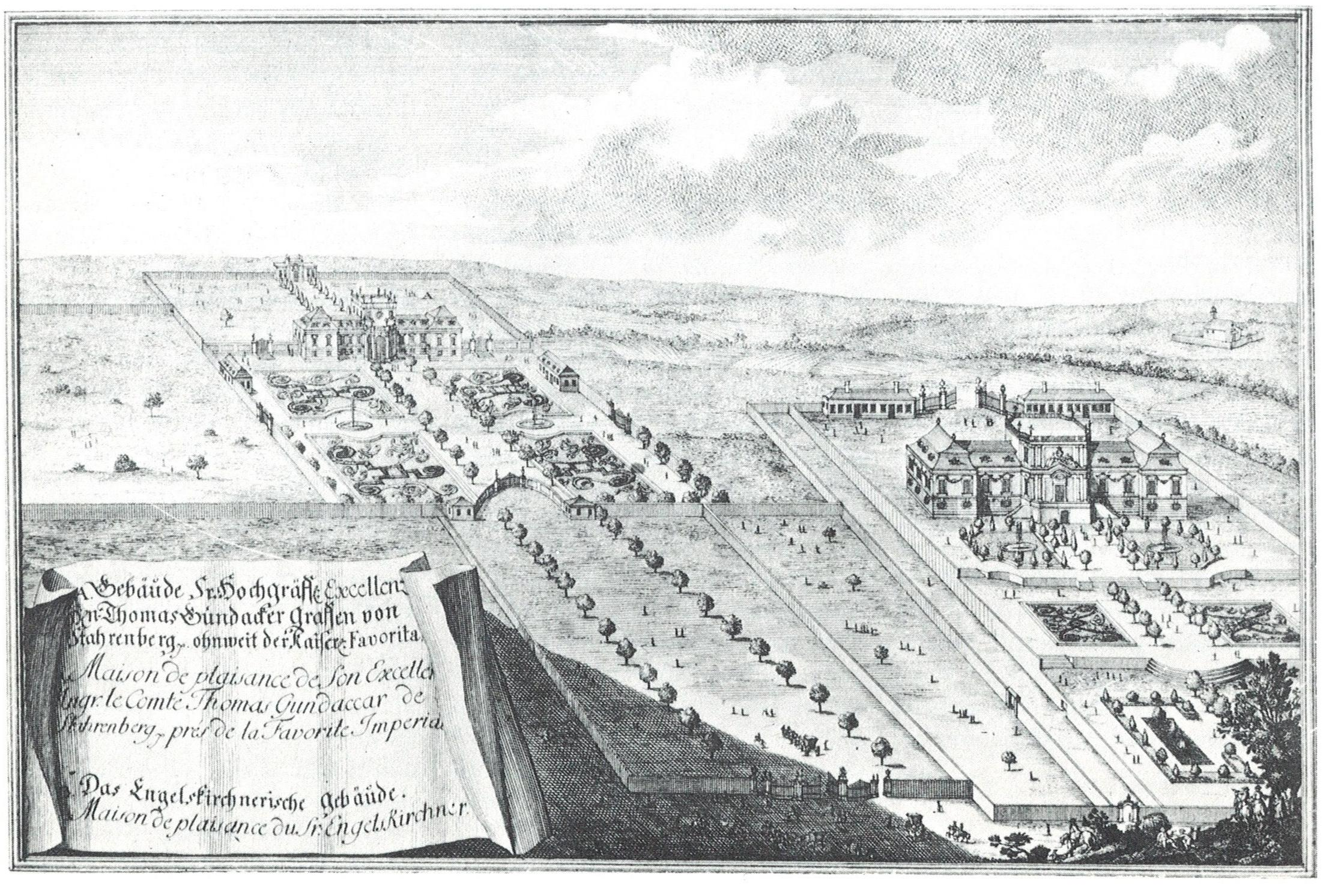
The palace where Elisabeth was raised in her early childhood

Born on 13 August 1743, Maria Elisabeth Josefa Johanna Antonia was the sixth (fourth living) of the sixteen children of Maria Theresa, ruler of the Habsburg monarchy, and Francis I Stephen, Holy Roman Emperor. She was given the customary education of an archduchess with a focus on religion, foreign languages, and etiquette, designed to make her a good consort. She was known as Elisabeth or Liesl in her family. As an infant, Elisabeth was small, frail, and sickly, worrying her family. Probably as a result of some gastrointestinal disease, she often failed to retain food and developed slowly. On the advice of the imperial doctors, she was moved to Engelskirchner Palace (later Archduke Rainer Palace, demolished in 1957) in Wieden; she was also prescribed chocolate drinks. Eventually, Elisabeth strengthened and grew into a lively child, who liked games and jokes, and teased her many siblings often. She was also very vain as a result of being considered the most beautiful among the archduchesses from an early age.

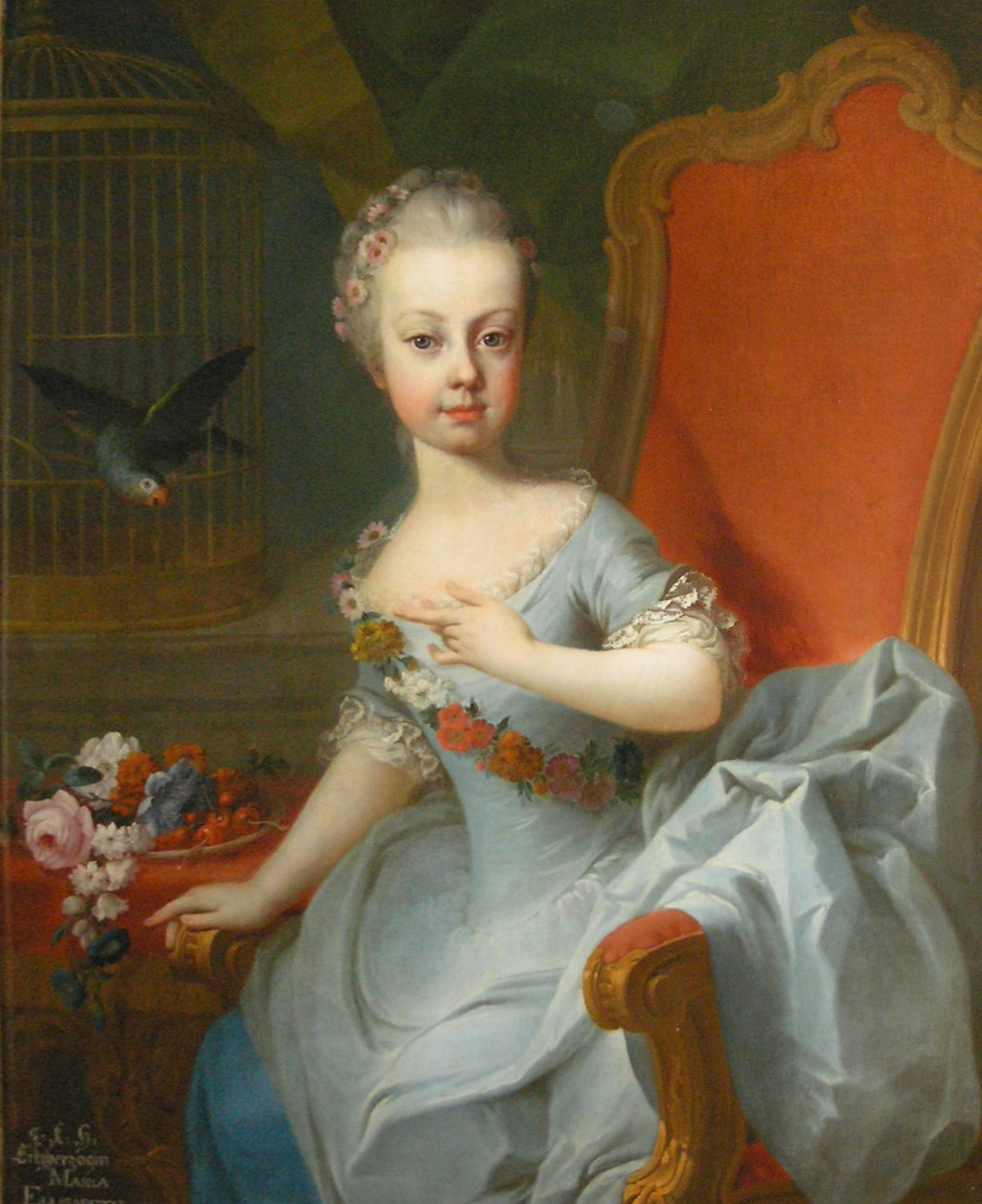
Elisabeth in her childhood

Elisabeth was brought up with her sister Maria Amalia, who was three years younger, and their aya, the Countess of Heister, is said to have had a difficult time with both of them. In adolescence, Elisabeth was described as unstable and eccentric, without any particular interests. She was fun-loving and neglected her studies. She earned her mother's censure by liking gossip and mocking everyone, offending her siblings and attendants with ironic comments. Her staff changed often, as few could stand her. Elisabeth was a difficult child to raise, and five ayas were appointed in turn to educate her; even her confessor needed to be changed once. Her mother considered her childish and immature, calling her eine Kokette der Schönheit ('a pretty coquette'), observing: 'It mattered not if the look of admiration came from a prince or a Swiss guard, Elisabeth was satisfied.'

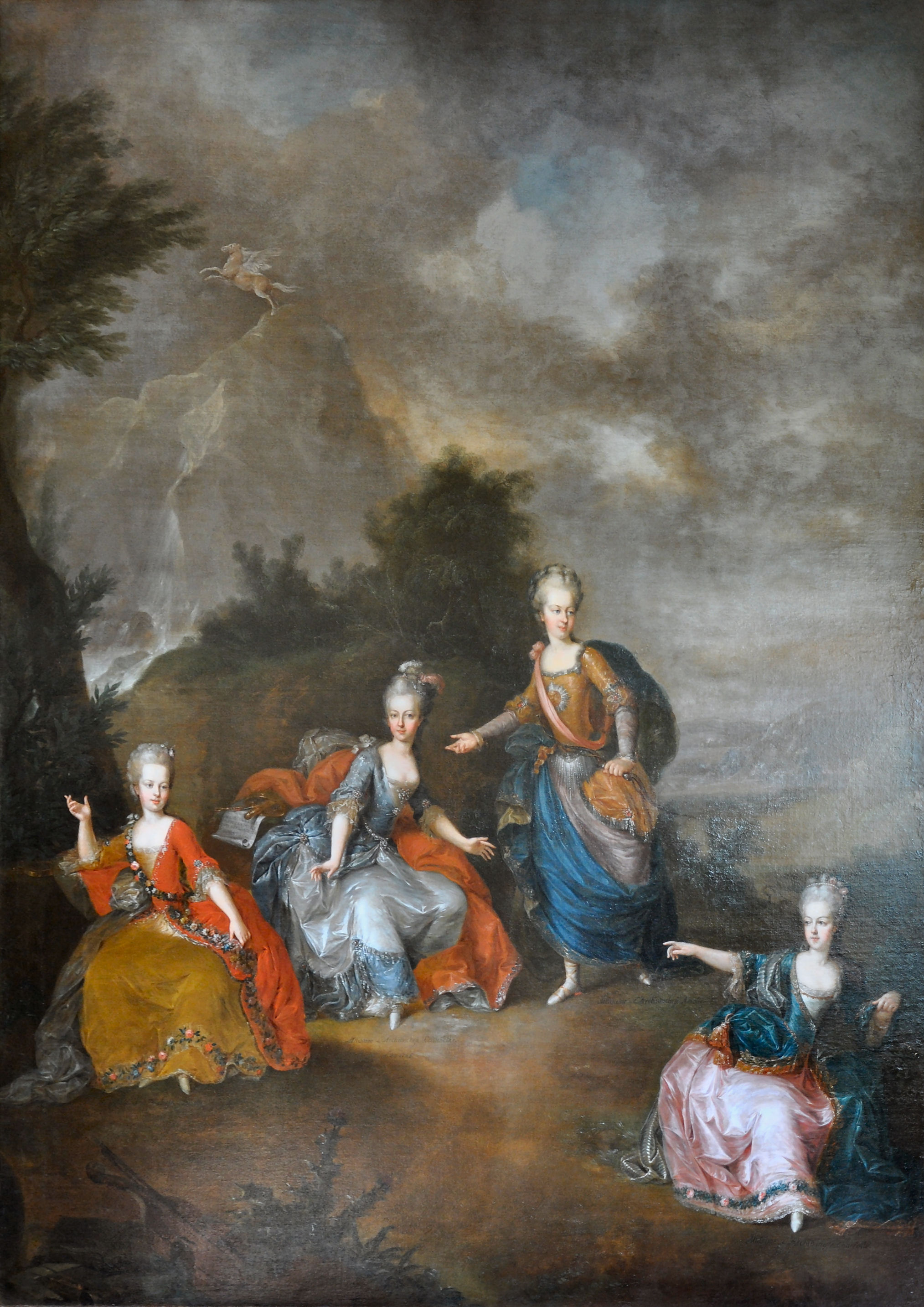
Elisabeth performing in Il Parnaso confuso

She was active in court life: at the wedding of her brother Joseph in 1765, she played the part of Apollo in the operetta Il Parnaso confuso by Christoph Willibald Gluck.

== Marriage negotiations ==
Elisabeth was considered a valuable asset in dynastic marriage negotiations due to her beauty. She was a subject of marriage speculations at an early age, but many proposals were denied because of the Viennese court's high expectations for the status of her groom.

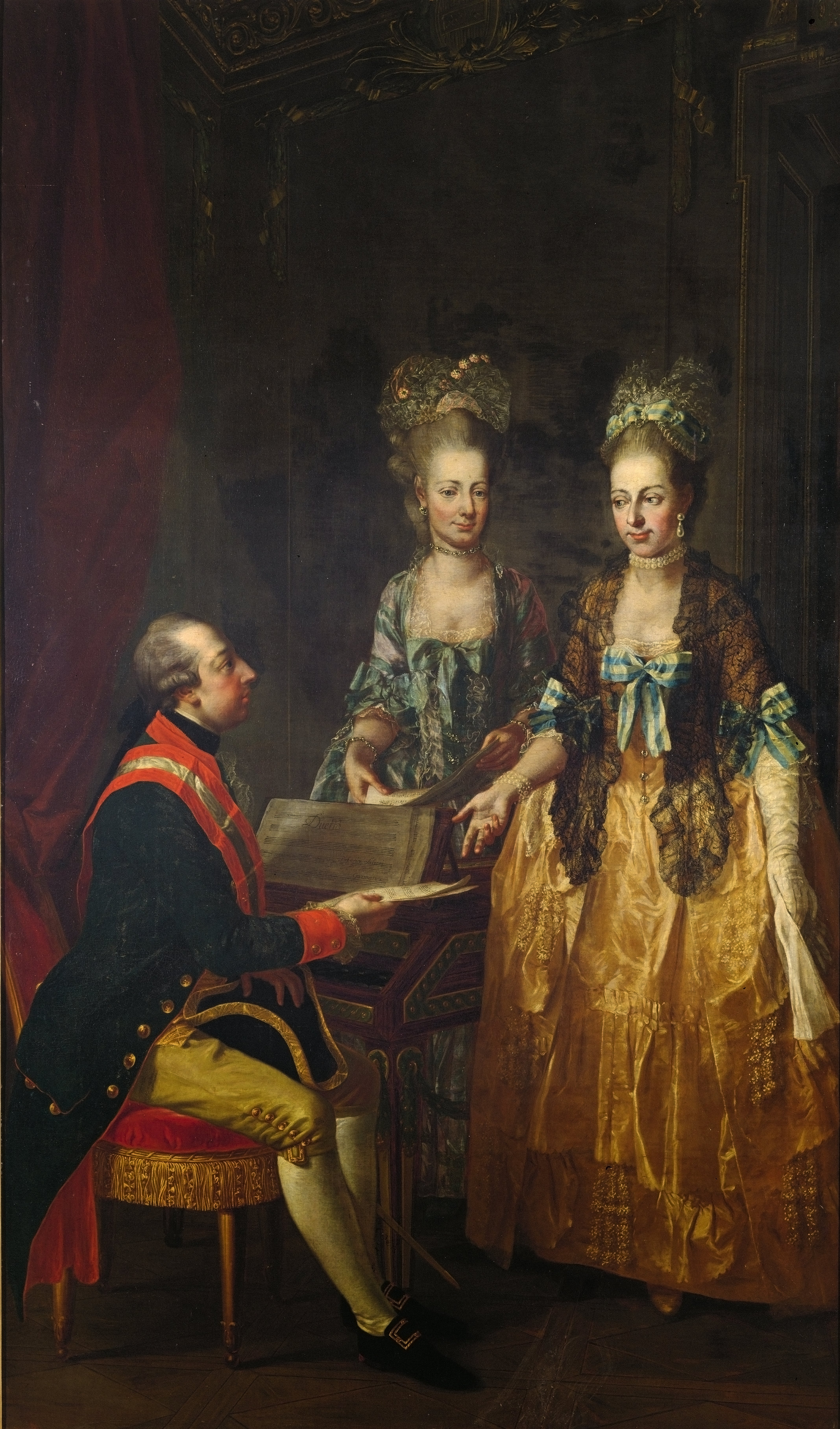
Elisabeth (left) with her two elder siblings: Maria Anna (right) and Joseph, King of the Romans. Portrait by Josef Hauzinger, 1778

When King Charles III of Spain was widowed in 1761, there were negotiations between Spain and Austria about a marriage between him and Elisabeth, but these ultimately failed. A marriage with King Stanisław II August of Poland was suggested after his succession in 1764, but both Catherine the Great of Russia and Maria Theresa disapproved for political reasons. The empress of Russia was wary of the Habsburg monarchy becoming stronger in Central and Eastern Europe, and Elisabeth's mother considered King Stanisław untrustworthy and of lowly origins. Next, her cousin, Prince Benedetto, Duke of Chablais, was proposed. Elisabeth declared herself very willing, but her brother Joseph did not find the match politically advantageous enough. In 1767, Elisabeth was already twenty-four, considered late to be unmarried for a princess in the 18th century.

Ambassadorial report on the Choiseul opposition to Elisabeth's marriage

Persons in power imagine that a queen, judicious and amiable, who would succeed in gaining the affection of her husband, might open his eyes to the irregularities and the enormous abuses which exist in all departments here, and cause much embarrassment to those who direct them. They are consequently of opinion that it behoves them to divert the mind of the King from ideas of marriage; and I have very strong proofs that Madame de Gramont, more interested than any one in the maintenance of the present abuses, has succeeded in persuading M. de Choiseul to renounce his own predilections in this affair.

— Count Mercy, quotes Williams (1905)

In 1768, simultaneously with the discussions of a marriage between her younger sister Archduchess Maria Antonia and Dauphin Louis Auguste (the future Louis XVI), a suggestion was made to engage Elisabeth to the widowed Louis XV of France, the dauphin's grandfather. A marriage contract was prepared and the negotiations were almost completed. However, before they could be finalised, Elisabeth fell ill with smallpox. Although she made a full recovery, it was reported that the illness had terribly scarred her face and destroyed her beauty, thus disrupting all plans of marriage. Additionally, the Choiseul party at the French royal court opposed the idea of King Louis XV remarrying.

== Abbess in Innsbruck ==
Her mother appointed Elisabeth as canoness of Innsbruck's Convent for Noble Ladies, which Maria Theresa had established in 1765 to pray for the soul of her late husband, Francis Stephen. Like her unmarried sister Maria Anna, Elisabeth did not live in the convent but continued to spend her time with the imperial court in Vienna.

After the death of her mother Maria Theresa in 1780, Elisabeth and her sisters Maria Anna and Maria Christina were asked by their brother Joseph II to leave court because he shunned the presence of women there, and wanted to put an end to what he referred to as his sisters Weiberwirtschaft or 'women's republic'. In May 1781, Elisabeth went to Innsbruck, where she would reside in the Imperial Castle as abbess for fifteen years, until January 1806.

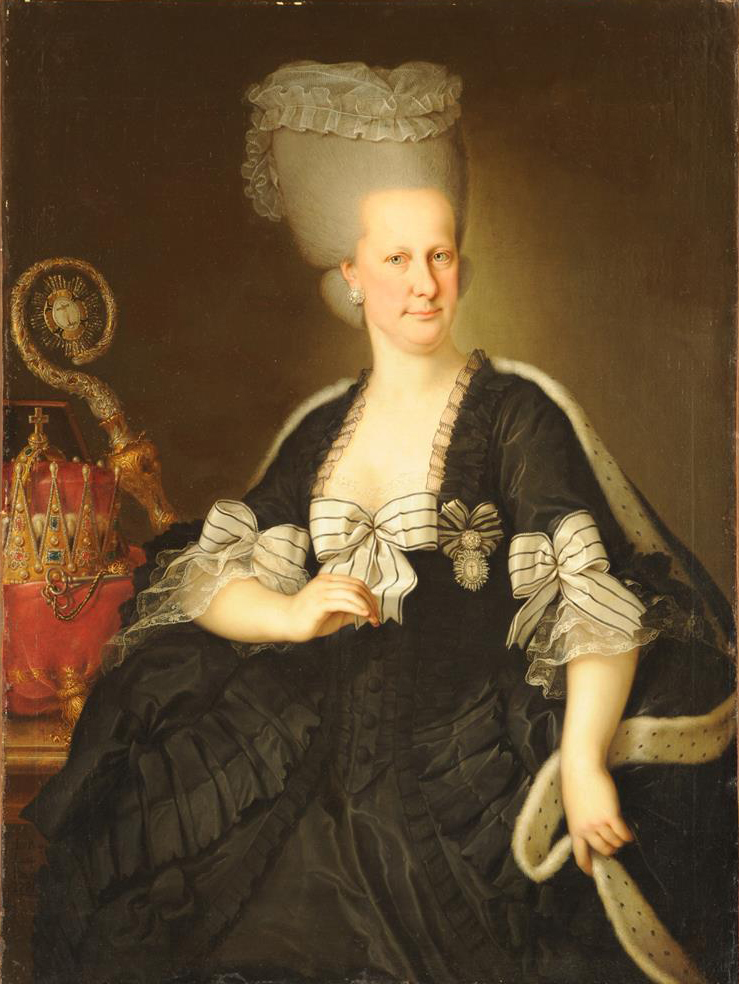
Portrait of Elisabeth in 1781, by Johann Baptist von Lampi the Elder

She did not live a monastic life: the convent afforded its members high rank, a personal allowance, a suite of rooms, and the freedom to participate in public life and high society. Elisabeth entertained much in her apartments, receiving guests and arranging family receptions. During this time, she was described as obese, and was referred to as the 'Kropferte Liesl' because of her smallpox scars. She became known and feared for her sharp wit; her friends described her as popular with a fiery personality. Sir John Swinburne described her sharp wit and humorous self-irony upon his visit.

Her younger brother Leopold, who succeeded Joseph as emperor in 1790, involved her more in state affairs, giving her representational tasks. In 1790, she ceremoniously opened the Landtag (State Diet) of Tyrol in his place, and often acted as his representative at ceremonial occasions. She received many important guests and entertained artists such as Johann Wolfgang von Goethe. Allowed to travel again, she visited the Puster Valley several times with her chamberlain, Count Spaur, and spent the winter of 1800–1801 in Bruneck.

== Flight to Linz and death ==
In January 1806, Elisabeth fled from Innsbruck to Vienna and then to Linz when Tyrol was taken over by Napoleon Bonaparte’s ally, the Kingdom of Bavaria. She spent her last years there, dying on 22 September 1808 at the age of sixty-five. She was buried in the Old Cathedral.

== Ancestry ==
Ancestors of Archduchess Maria Elisabeth of Austria (born 1743)

16. Nicholas II, Duke of Lorraine
8. Charles V, Duke of Lorraine
17. Claude Françoise of Lorraine
4. Leopold, Duke of Lorraine
18. Ferdinand III, Holy Roman Emperor
9. Eleanor of Austria
19. Eleonora Gonzaga
2. Francis I, Holy Roman Emperor
20. Louis XIII of France
10. Philippe I, Duke of Orléans
21. Anne of Austria
5. Élisabeth Charlotte of Orléans
22. Charles I Louis, Elector Palatine
11. Elizabeth Charlotte of the Palatinate
23. Charlotte of Hesse-Kassel
1. Archduchess Maria Elisabeth of Austria
24. Ferdinand III, Holy Roman Emperor (= 18)
12. Leopold I, Holy Roman Emperor
25. Maria Anna of Austria
6. Charles VI, Holy Roman Emperor
26. Philip William, Elector Palatine
13. Eleonor Magdalene of Neuburg
27. Elisabeth Amalie of Hesse-Darmstadt
3. Maria Theresa of Austria
28. Anthony Ulrich, Duke of Brunswick-Wolfenbüttel
14. Louis Rudolph, Duke of Brunswick-Wolfenbüttel
29. Elisabeth Juliana of Schleswig-Holstein
7. Elisabeth Christine of Brunswick
30. Albert Ernest I, Prince of Oettingen-Oettingen
15. Christine Louise of Oettingen-Oettingen
31. Christine Friederike of Württemberg
