= Symphony No. 9 (Mozart) =

1769/1770 symphony by W. A. Mozart

- by W. A. Mozart
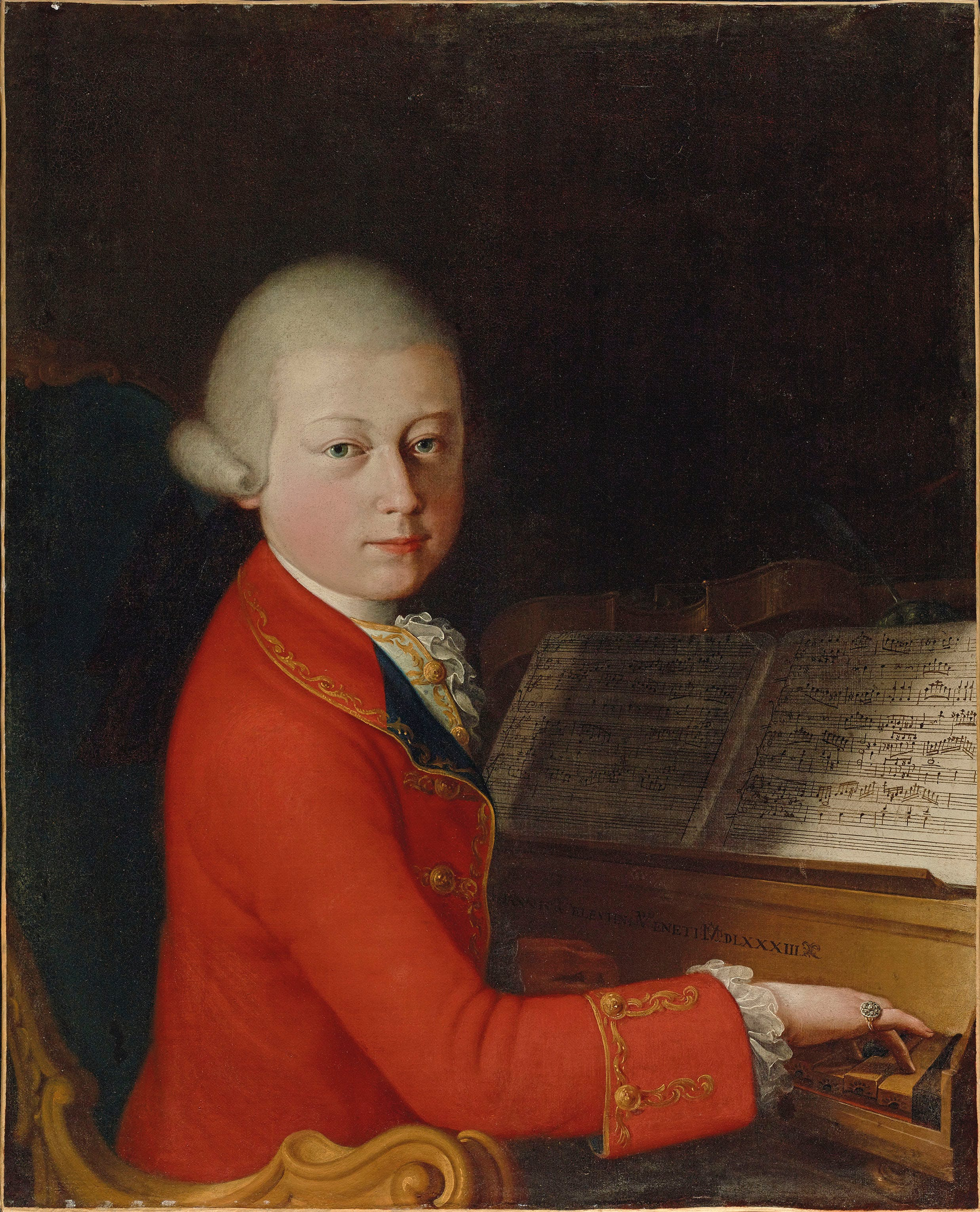
- 1770 Verona portrait of Mozart
- Key: C major
- Catalogue: K. 73
- Composed: Italy, 1769–70
- Movements: 4
- Scoring: Orchestra with continuo

Symphony No. 9 in C major, K. 73 (K^{3} 75a), by Wolfgang Amadeus Mozart, has an uncertain provenance. The most likely date of its composition appears to be late 1769 or early 1770 during Mozart's first Italian journey, although some authorities have dated it "probably not before early summer 1772". It may have been started in Salzburg, before the first Italian journey began, and completed during the trip.

The symphony is in four movements and is Mozart's first extant symphony in the key of C major. There is no information concerning which of the many Italian concerts given by the Mozarts during this visit saw this symphony's first performance. The autograph score is preserved in the Jagiellonian Library in Kraków.

== Movements and instrumentation ==
The symphony is score for 2 flutes, 2 oboes, bassoon, 2 horns in C, 2 trumpets in C, timpani, strings and continuo.

There are four movements:

1. Allegro, 4/4
2. Andante, 2/4 in F major
3. Menuetto and Trio, 3/4
4. Molto allegro, 2/4
