= Il Parnaso confuso =

Opera by Christoph Willibald Gluck

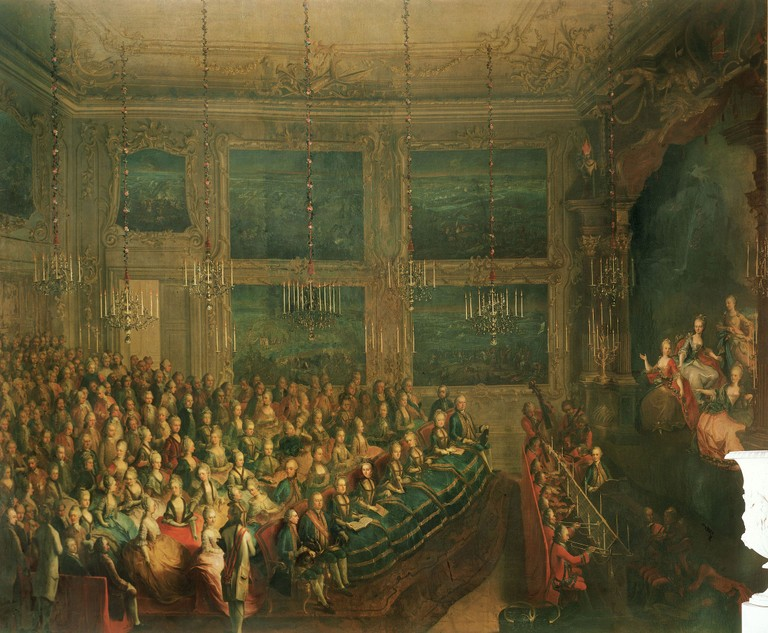
A performance of Il parnaso confuso in 1765, painting by Johann Franz Greipel

Il Parnaso confuso (Parnassus in Turmoil) is an opera by the composer Christoph Willibald Gluck. It takes the form of an azione teatrale in one act. The Italian-language libretto is by Pietro Metastasio. The opera premiered on 24 January 1765 at Schönbrunn Palace in Vienna. All the members of the cast were archduchesses of the Habsburg family and the work was conducted by the future Emperor Leopold II from the harpsichord.

== Roles ==
Cast	Voice type	Premiere
Apollo	soprano (en travesti)	Archduchess Maria Elisabeth of Austria
Melpomene	soprano	Archduchess Maria Amalia of Austria
Erato	soprano	Archduchess Maria Carolina of Austria
Euterpe	soprano	Archduchess Maria Josepha of Austria

== Recording ==
- Il Parnaso confuso The Queen's Chamber Band, conducted by Rudolph Palmer (Albany Records, 2004)

== Sources ==
- Holden, Amanda The Viking Opera Guide (Viking, 1993), page 378.
- Gluck Gesamtausgabe Il Parnaso confuso
