= Martin van Meytens =

Swedish-Austrian painter (1695–1770)

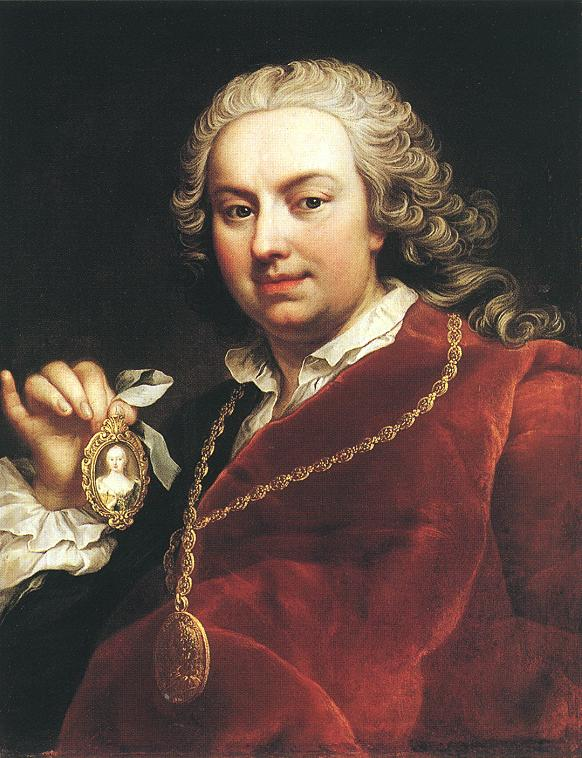
- van Meytens, Self-Portrait, c. 1740s.
- Born: 24 June 1695; Stockholm, Sweden
- Died: 23 March 1770 (aged 74); Vienna, Austria

Martin van Meytens (24 June 1695 – 23 March 1770) was a Swedish-Austrian painter who painted members of the Royal Court of Austria such as Marie Antoinette, Maria Theresa of Austria, Francis I, Holy Roman Emperor, the Emperor's family and members of the local aristocracy. His painting style inspired many other painters to paint in a similar format.

== Life and career ==
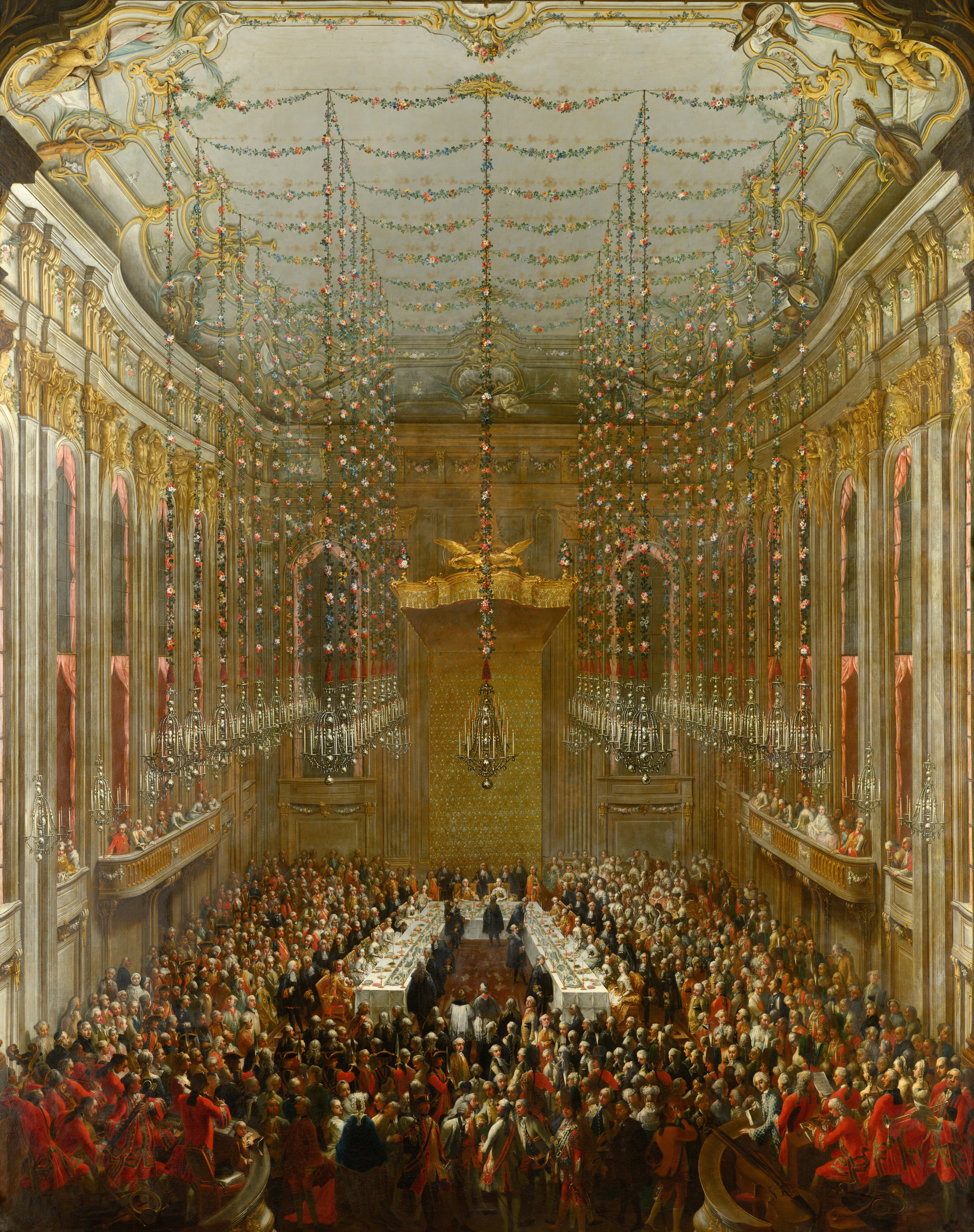
Wedding Supper by Martin van Meytens

Martin van Meytens was born and baptised in Stockholm, Sweden, son of the painter Martin Meytens the Elder, who had moved around 1677 from The Hague to Sweden. He went early in his career on an extended study trip. He visited London, Paris and Vienna, then he lived and worked for a long time in Italy (Rome, Turin). At the beginning he painted little enamel miniature portraits, and he changed to oil painting only around 1730, having settled in Vienna. Here he became very popular as a portrait painter in the circles of the court and the aristocracy. In 1732 he became a court painter, and in 1759 the director of the Viennese Academy of Fine Arts. Franz Xaver Messerschmidt was his protégé.

== Aristocratic Baroque ==
Meytens was paid by Maria Theresa of Austria for opulent commissions. For example in 1943, depicting Maria Theresa as warrior. This was only one instance of Meytens painting aristocratic Baroque culture in expensive splendidness.

The Wedding Supper depicts the wedding of Princess Isabella of Parma and Joseph II, Holy Roman Emperor, 5 October 1760, at Hofburg Palace's Redoutensaele (Redoute Hall). The moment depicted is when the dessert is served, in the middle of the table is a garden made by sugar crust.

Meytens has been credited with painting the European elite true to life. His most noticeable pupil was Joseph Hickel.

== Works ==
- ca. 1731; Kneeling Nun, Recto, (Nationalmuseum – Stockholm)
- 1741; Kaiser Franz I
- 1744; Maria Theresia, (Ghent Town Hall)
- 1745–1750; Familie der Grafen Pálffy
- 1750; Archduke Maximilian, (The Winnipeg Art Gallery)
- 1752–1753; Fam. Grill, ( Museum Gothenburg)
- 1750–1755; Maria Theresia als Herrscherin, (Schönbrunn Palace)
- 1754; Ksl. Familie, (Schönbrunn Palace);
- 1759; Maria Theresia, (Academy of Fine Arts)

== Selected works ==
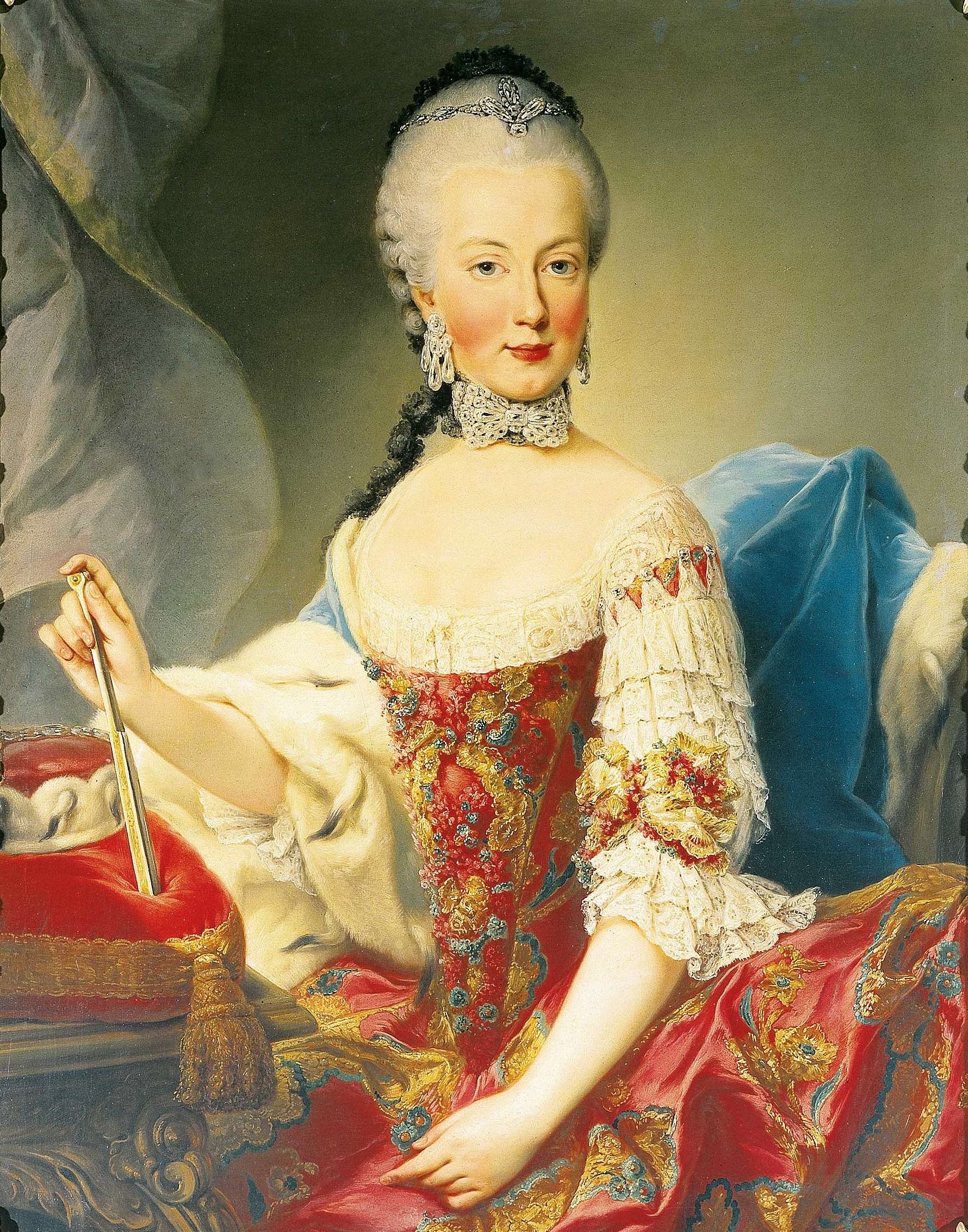
Archduchess Maria Amalia of Austria (later Maria Amalia, Duchess of Parma)

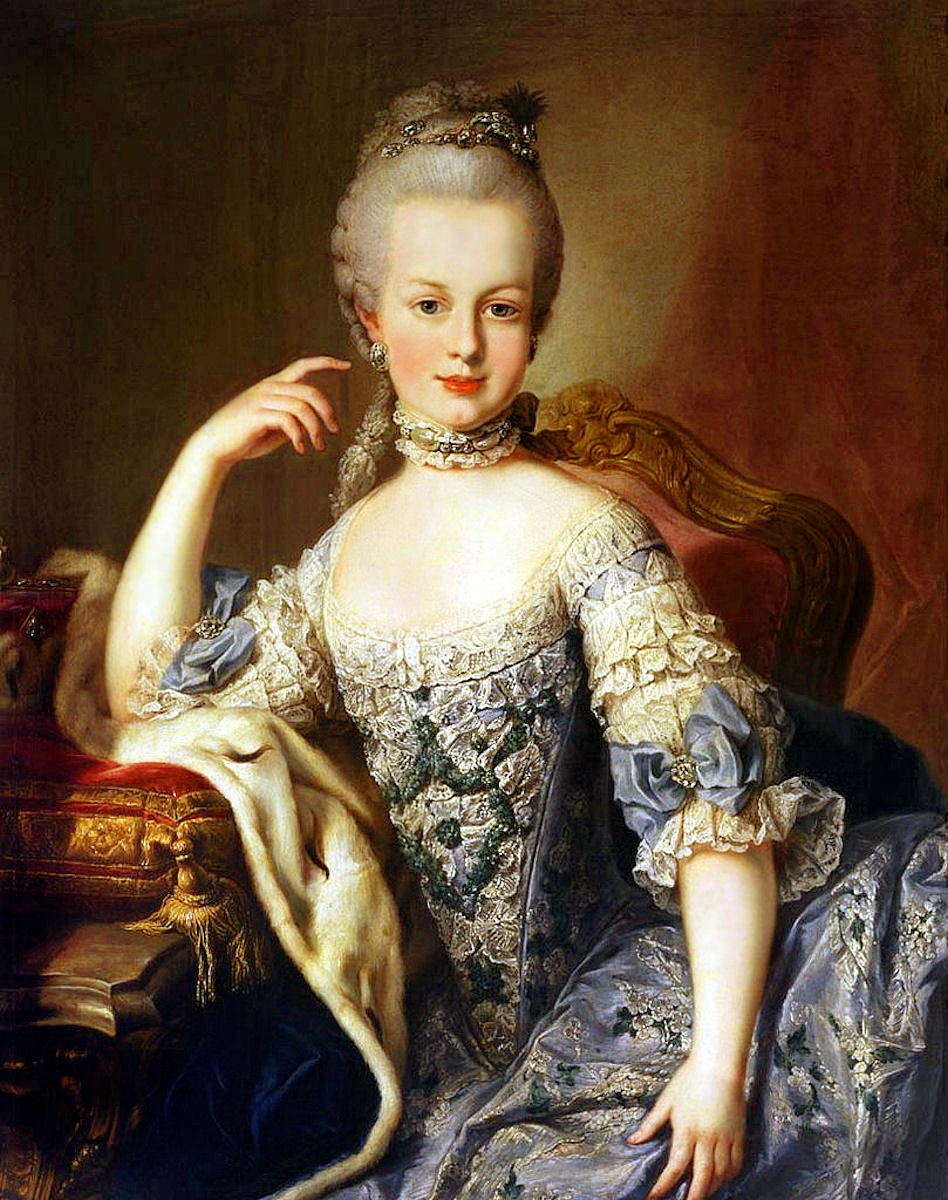
Archduchess Maria Antonia of Austria, 1767 (later Marie Antoinette, Queen of France)

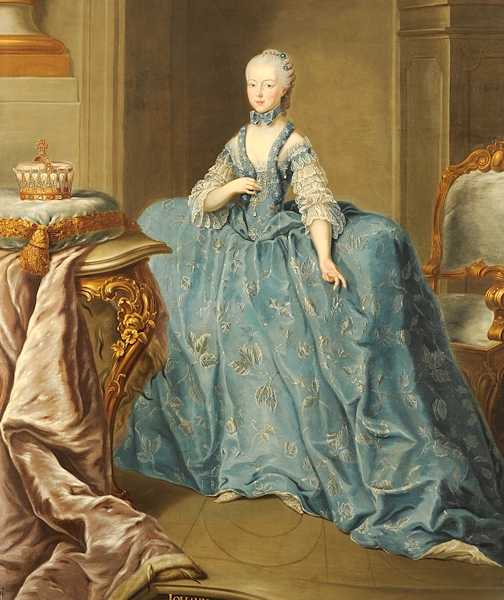
Archduchess Maria Johanna Gabriela of Austria

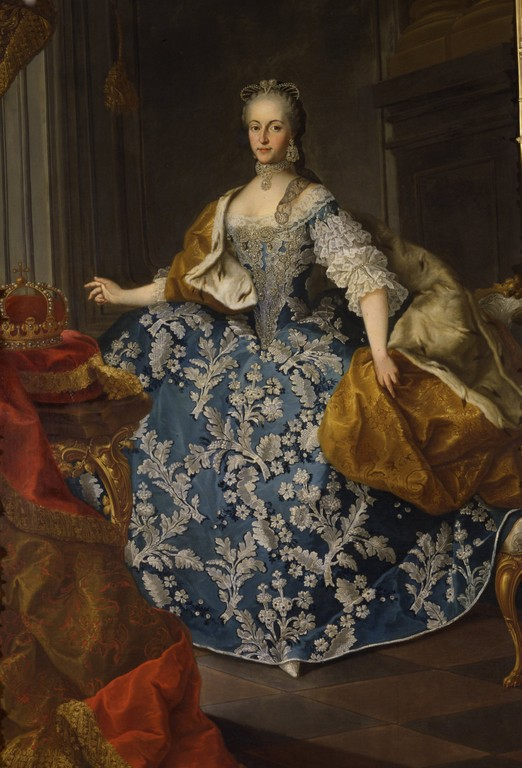
Maria Josepha of Bavaria, Holy Roman Empress

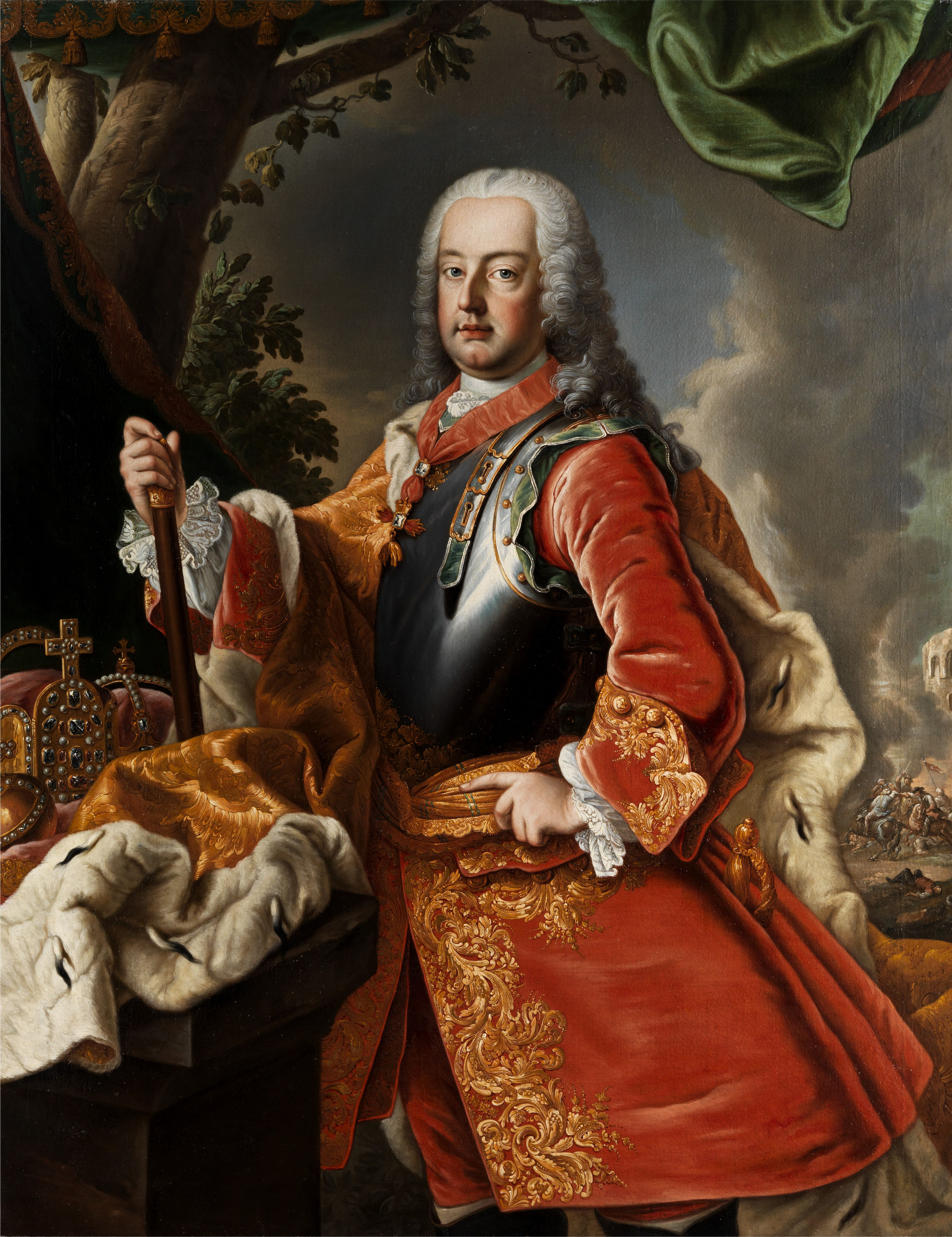
Portrait of Emperor Francis I (workshop)

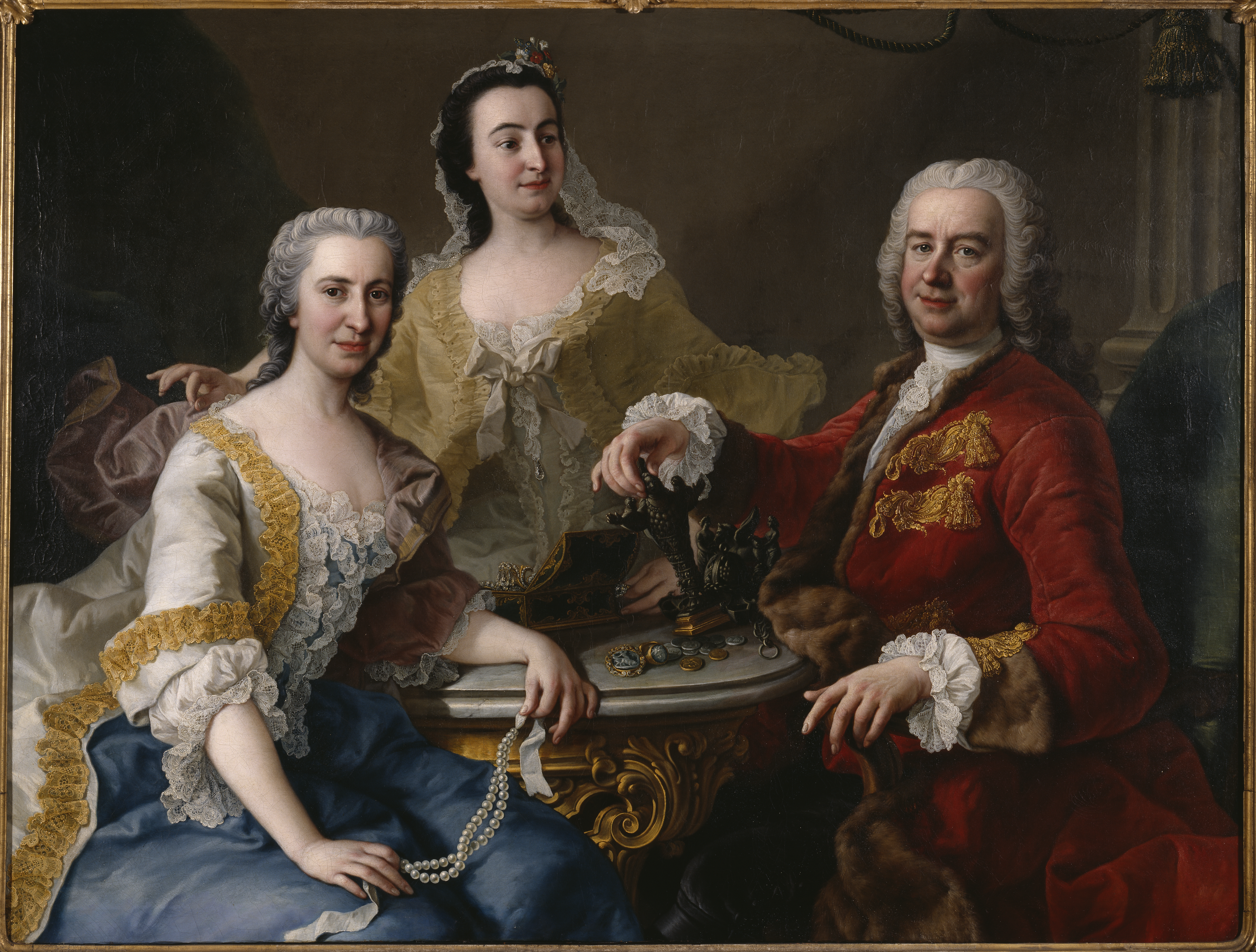
Joseph de France and his Family

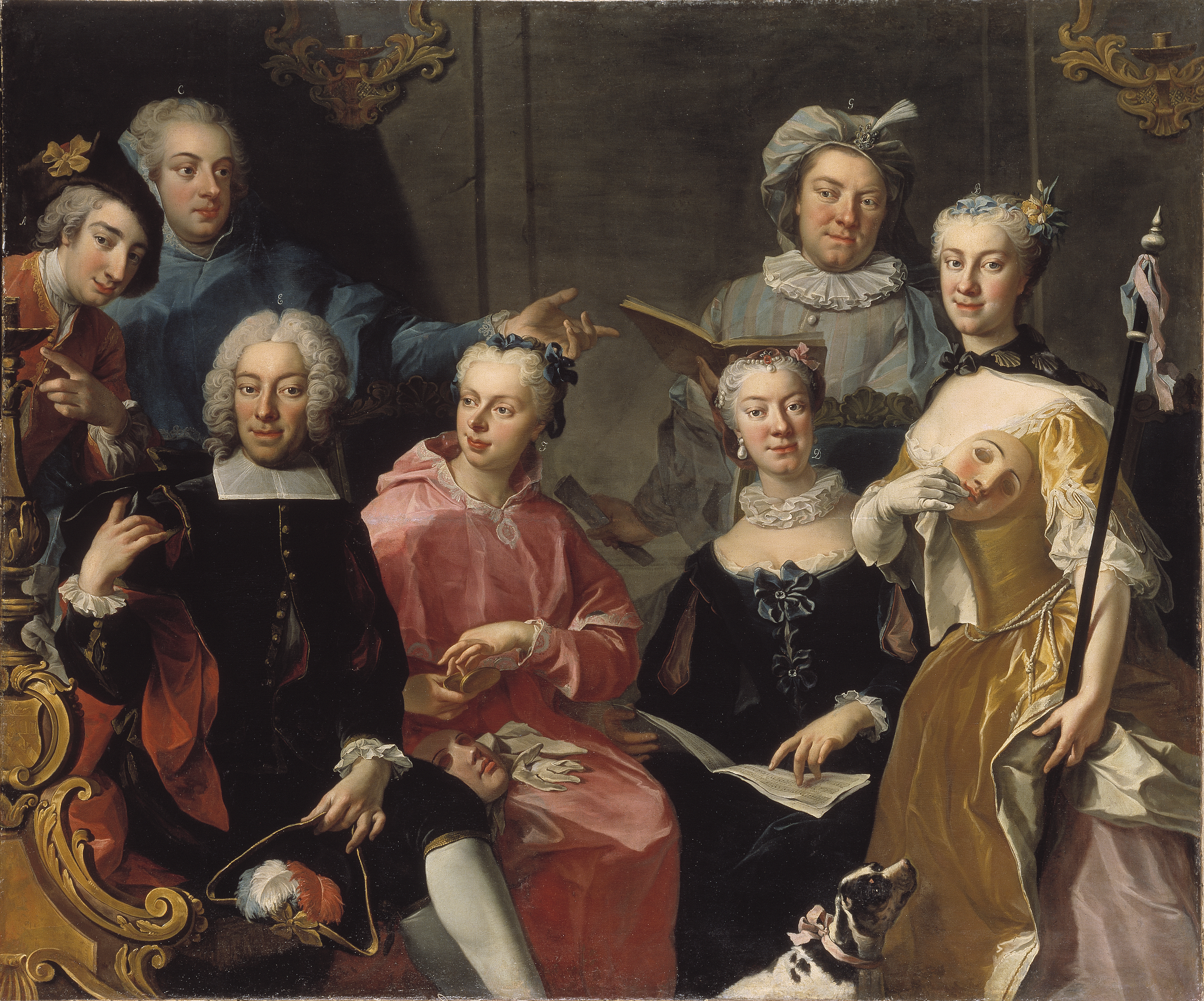
Sackska family painting

Kneeling Nun, 1731 (front)

Kneeling Nun, 1731 (rear)

== Other sources ==
- Biography – Austria Forum
- Biography – Web Gallery of Art
- Biography and more paintings – ArtExperts.
