= Archduchess Maria Anna of Austria (governor) =

Austrian royal (1718–1744)

Archduchess Maria Anna
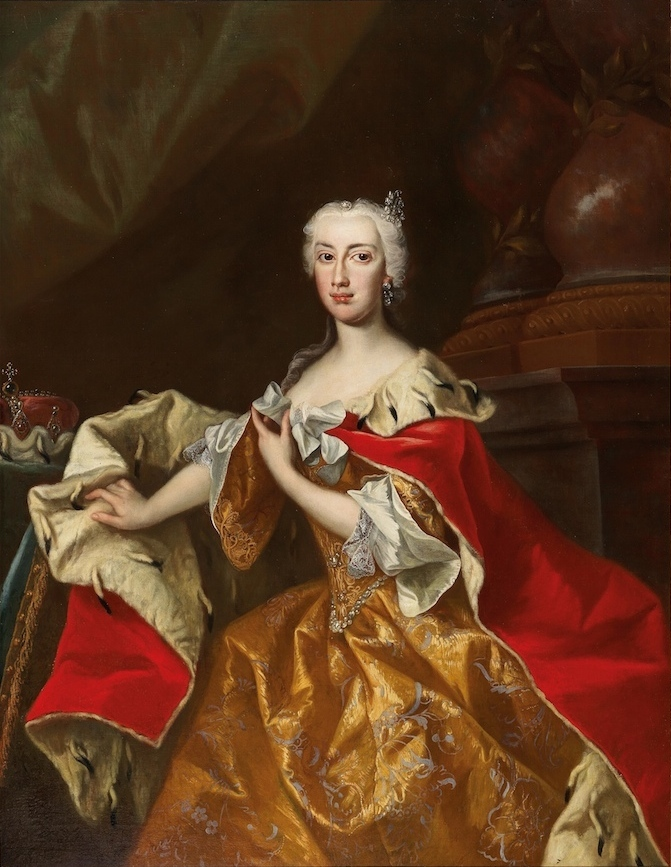
- Portrait by Johann Gottfried Auerbach, c. 1744

Governor of the Austrian Netherlands
- Reign: 8 January 1744 – 16 December 1744
- Predecessor: Friedrich August von Harrach-Rohrau (Interim)
- Successor: Prince Charles Alexander of Lorraine
- Born: 18 September 1718; Hofburg Palace, Vienna, Archduchy of Austria, Holy Roman Empire
- Died: 16 December 1744 (aged 26); Brussels, Duchy of Brabant, Austrian Netherlands, Holy Roman Empire
- Burial: Imperial Crypt, Vienna, Austria
- Spouse: Prince Charles Alexander of Lorraine (m. 1744)
Names
- Maria Anna Eleanor Wilhelmina Josepha of Austria
- House: Habsburg
- Father: Charles VI, Holy Roman Emperor
- Mother: Elisabeth Christine of Brunswick
- Religion: Catholicism

Archduchess Maria Anna of Austria (Maria Anna Eleonore Wilhelmine Josepha; 18 September 1718 – 16 December 1744) was a member of the House of Habsburg who governed the Austrian Netherlands in the name of her elder sister, Empress Maria Theresa till her death in 16 December 1744.

== Life ==
Maria Anna was born at the Hofburg Imperial Palace in Vienna. Her birth was not well received by her father. She and her sister Maria Theresa were the only children of Charles VI, Holy Roman Emperor, and Elisabeth Christine of Brunswick to survive into adulthood. The two sisters were raised in the Imperial Court (Kaiserhof) in Vienna. During her youth she met her future brother in law, Francis Stephen of Lorraine and his younger brother Charles Alexander of Lorraine. The two princes were staying in Austria for their education; their mother Élisabeth Charlotte d'Orléans was in France.

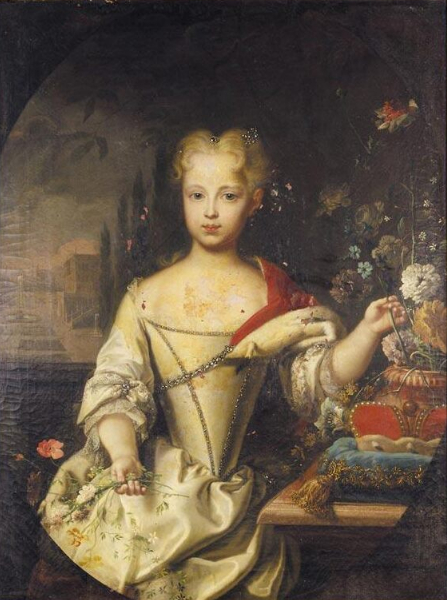
Maria Anna with Archducal coronet by Frans van Stampart, c. 1725

In 1725, negotiations with the Queen of Spain, Elisabeth Farnese had Maria Anna as a possible wife of Philip, Duke of Parma, who was just five. This match was supposed to smooth over relations with Spain. An alliance of Spain and Austria was signed on 30 April 1725 and thus guaranteed the Pragmatic Sanction of 1713, allowing Maria Theresa right of her father's lands being his eldest daughter. Based on the terms of the treaty, the Habsburg monarchy relinquished all claims to the Spanish throne. It also agreed that Spain would invade Gibraltar with the help of the Austrians. Despite this, the Anglo-Spanish War stopped the ambitions of Elisabeth of Parma and with the signing of the Treaty of Seville (9 November 1729) saw the abandonment of the Austro-Spanish marriage plans.

She fell in love with Charles Alexander of Lorraine, the younger brother of Maria Theresa's husband, Francis Stephen. There was considerable resistance to their marriage, not least the wish of her father for a politically more important son-in-law.

Maria Anna's husband-to-be was a half-second-cousin-once-removed, being a third generation descendant of Ferdinand III, Holy Roman Emperor, through two of Ferdinand III's children, Leopold I, Holy Roman Emperor and his half-sister Eleonora Maria of Austria.

=== Governor of the Austrian Netherlands ===
It was only after their father's death that Empress Elisabeth Christine gave the approval for the marriage, which was concluded in the Augustinian Church, Vienna on 7 January 1744. The marriage was recognised by letters patent signed on 8 January.

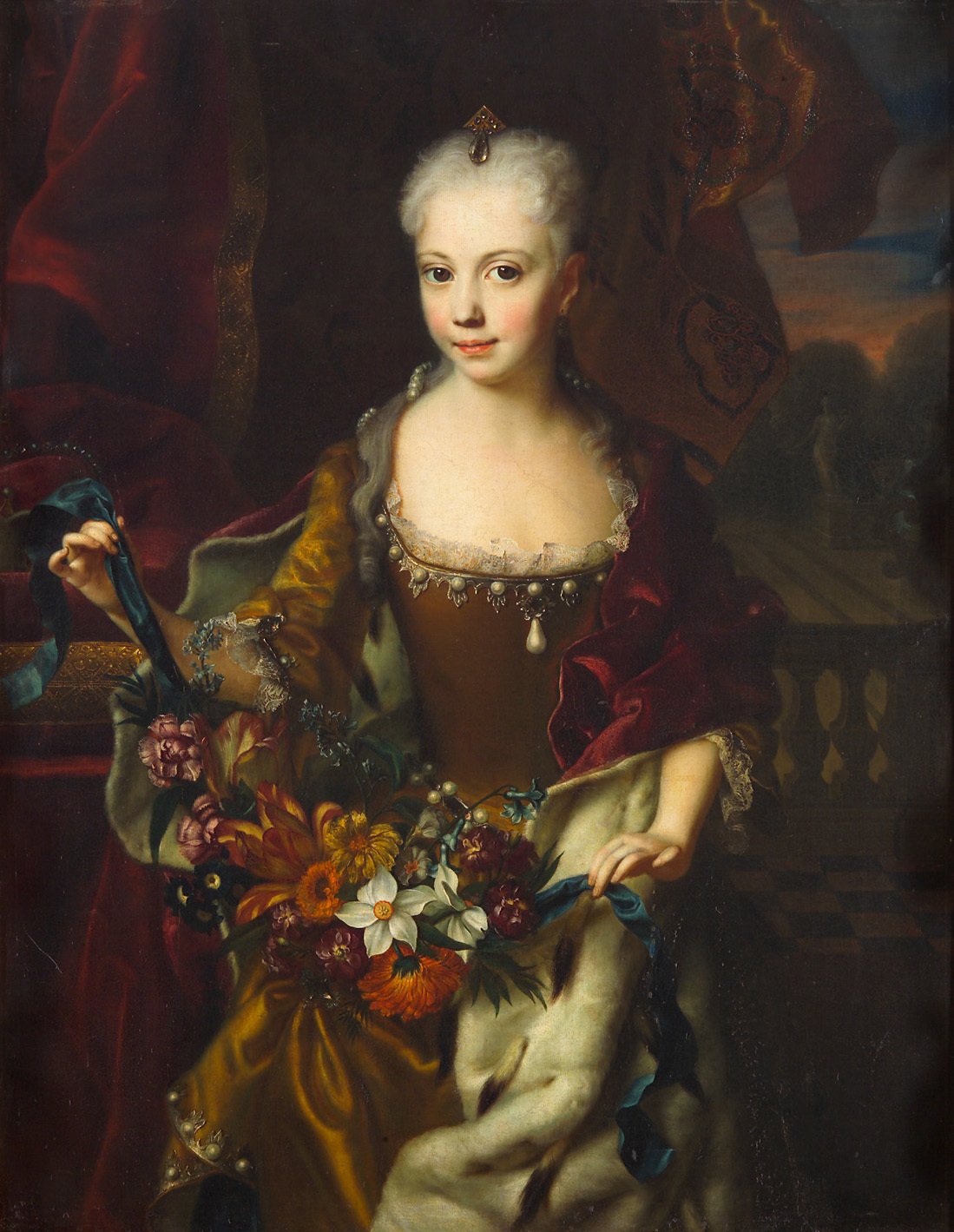
Archduchess Maria Anna in 1729, by Andreas Møller. The flowers which she carries in the uplifted folds of her dress represent her fertility and expectations to bear children in adulthood.

Weeks after the marriage, the couple was appointed governors of the Austrian Netherlands in succession of their aunt Archduchess Maria Elisabeth of Austria, who had died in 1741. The couple left Vienna on 3 February and arrived in Wuustwezel, a town in the Austrian Netherlands, on 24 March where they were met by Count Karl Ferdinand von Königsegg-Erps. Karl Ferdinand was a member of the Supreme council of the Netherlands and had to receive Prince Charles and Maria Anna due to etiquette. Their arrival was greeted with much celebration. A ceremony had been organised for their arrival; this included a Te Deum and a collection of balls and banquets.

The couple only had two months of time together in the Netherlands, as Charles had to leave to participate in the war against Prussia, while Maria Anna, pregnant with their first child, remained in Brussels. Charles left officially on 4 May.

While alone in Brussels, Maria Anna was assisted in governing by the Austrian statesman Count Wenzel Anton von Kaunitz-Rietberg.

=== Death ===
On 9 October 1744 Maria Anna went into labour and gave birth to a stillborn daughter; she never recovered and died 16 December 1744 as after-effect to the difficult childbirth. She and her daughter were buried in the Imperial Crypt in Vienna. Charles Alexander never remarried, and would remain the governor until his death in 1780. He was a very popular governor and died in Brussels like his wife.

== Ancestry ==
Ancestors of Archduchess Maria Anna of Austria (governor)

8. Ferdinand III, Holy Roman Emperor
4. Leopold I, Holy Roman Emperor
9. Maria Anna of Austria
2. Charles VI, Holy Roman Emperor
10. Philip William, Elector Palatine
5. Eleonor Magdalene of Neuburg
11. Elisabeth Amalie of Hesse-Darmstadt
1. Archduchess Maria Anna of Austria
12. Anthony Ulrich, Duke of Brunswick-Wolfenbüttel
6. Louis Rudolph, Duke of Brunswick-Wolfenbüttel
13. Elisabeth Juliana of Holstein-Norburg
3. Elisabeth Christine of Brunswick
14. Albert Ernest I, Prince of Oettingen-Oettingen
7. Princess Christine Louise of Oettingen-Oettingen
15. Christine Friederike of Württemberg

Political offices
Preceded by Friedrich August von Harrach-Rohrau	Governor of the Austrian Netherlands; 1744; Served alongside: Prince Charles Alexander of Lorraine	Succeeded by Charles Alexander of Lorraine
