= Johann Gottfried Auerbach =

Austrian artist (1697–1753)

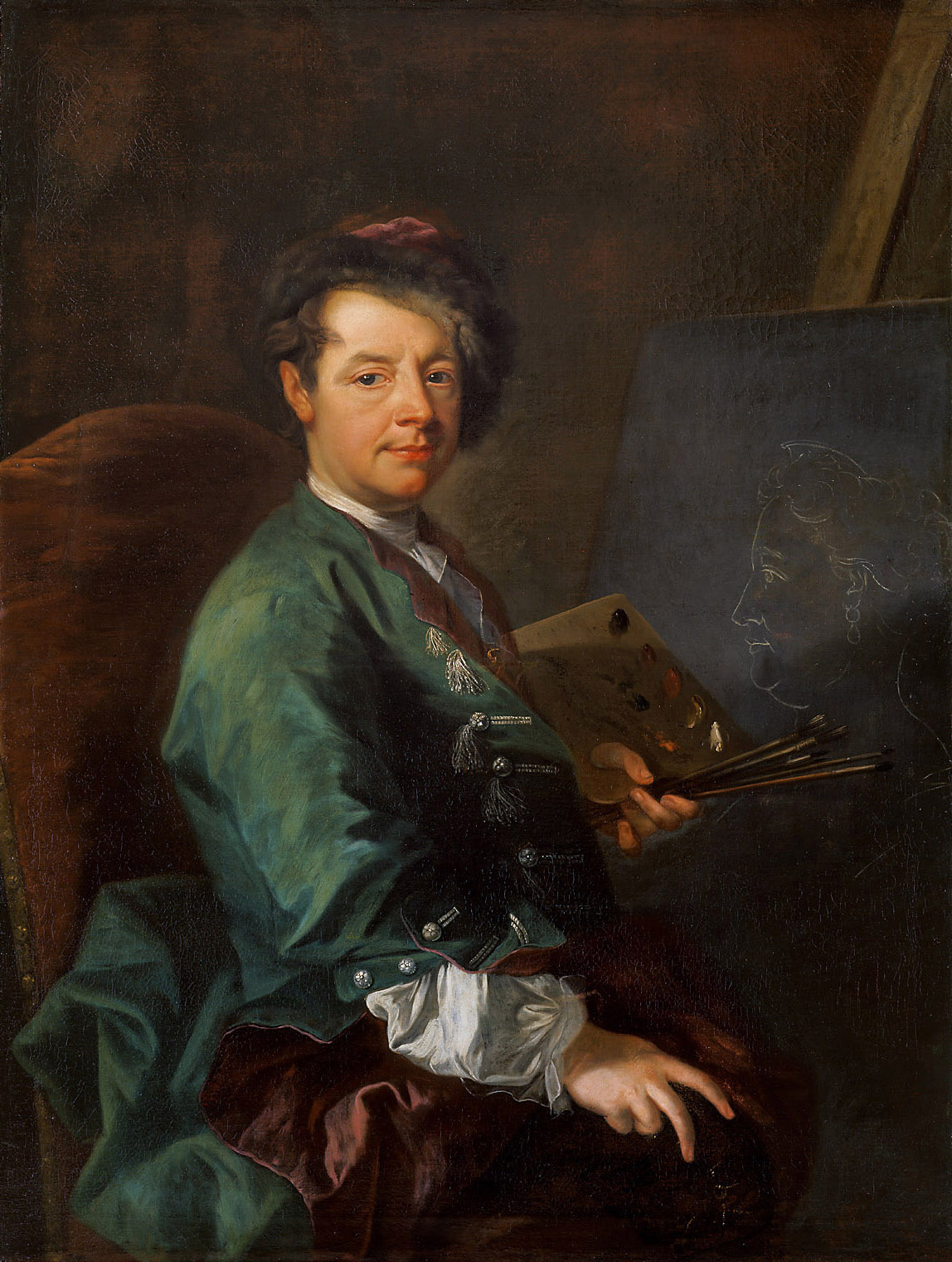
Self Portrait before the Easel with the profile portrait of Empress Elisabeth Christine, 1737

Johann Gottfried Auerbach (28 October 1697 – 5 August 1753) was an Austrian painter and etcher. He painted primarily portraits and battle genre works. Some of his works can be found at the Kunsthistorisches Museum. In 1735, he was appointed Imperial Court Painter by Emperor Charles VI. In 1750, he became a member of the Academy of Fine Arts.

== Works ==
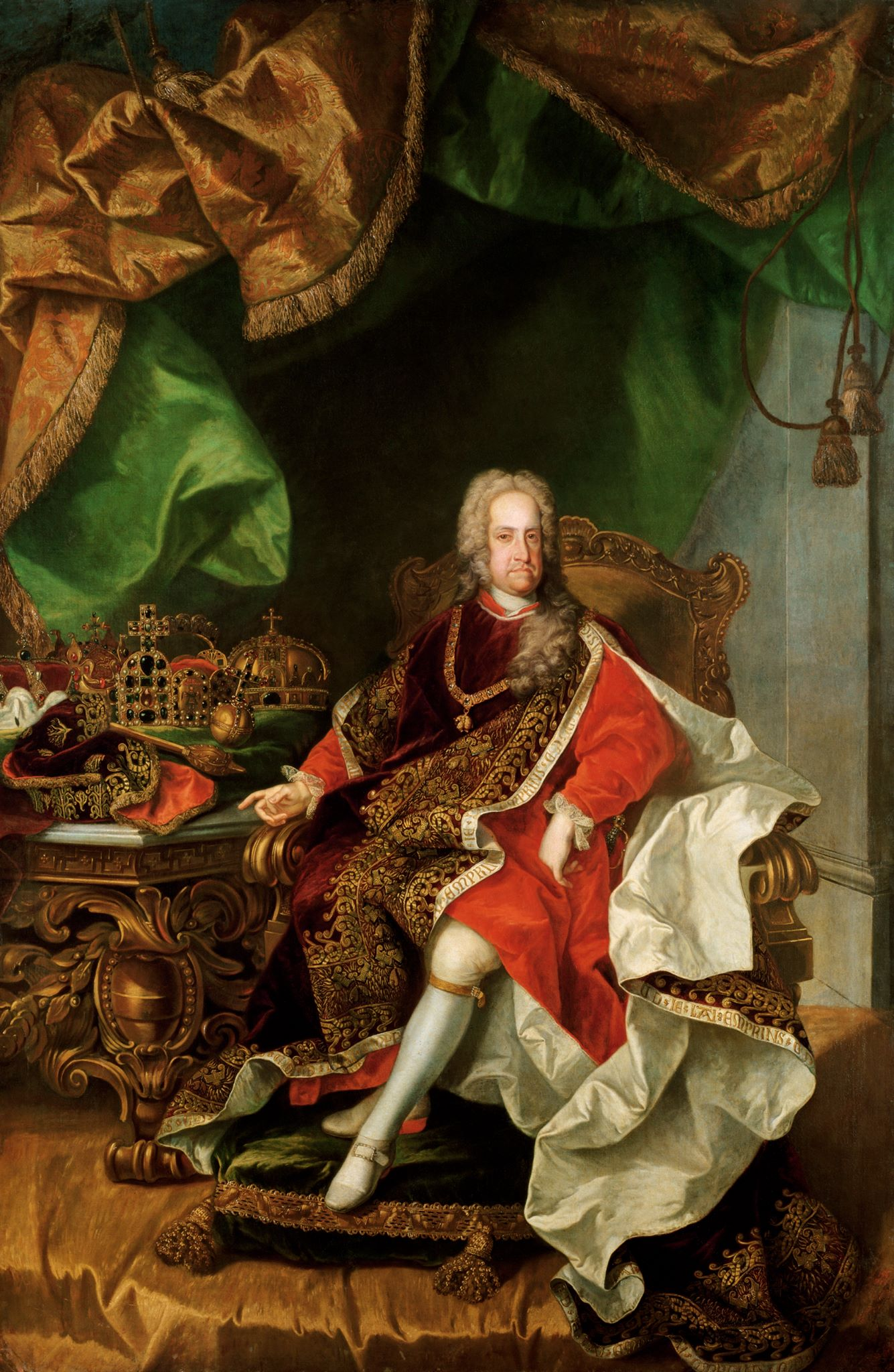
Charles VI wearing the Order of the Golden Fleece, c. 1730s, Hofburg Palace, Vienna

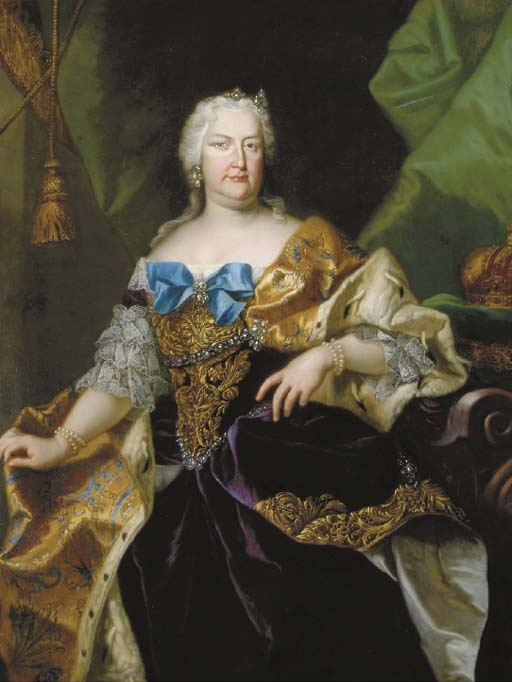
Empress Elisabeth Christine, c. 1735, misidentified as Archduchess Maria Theresa, unidentified location

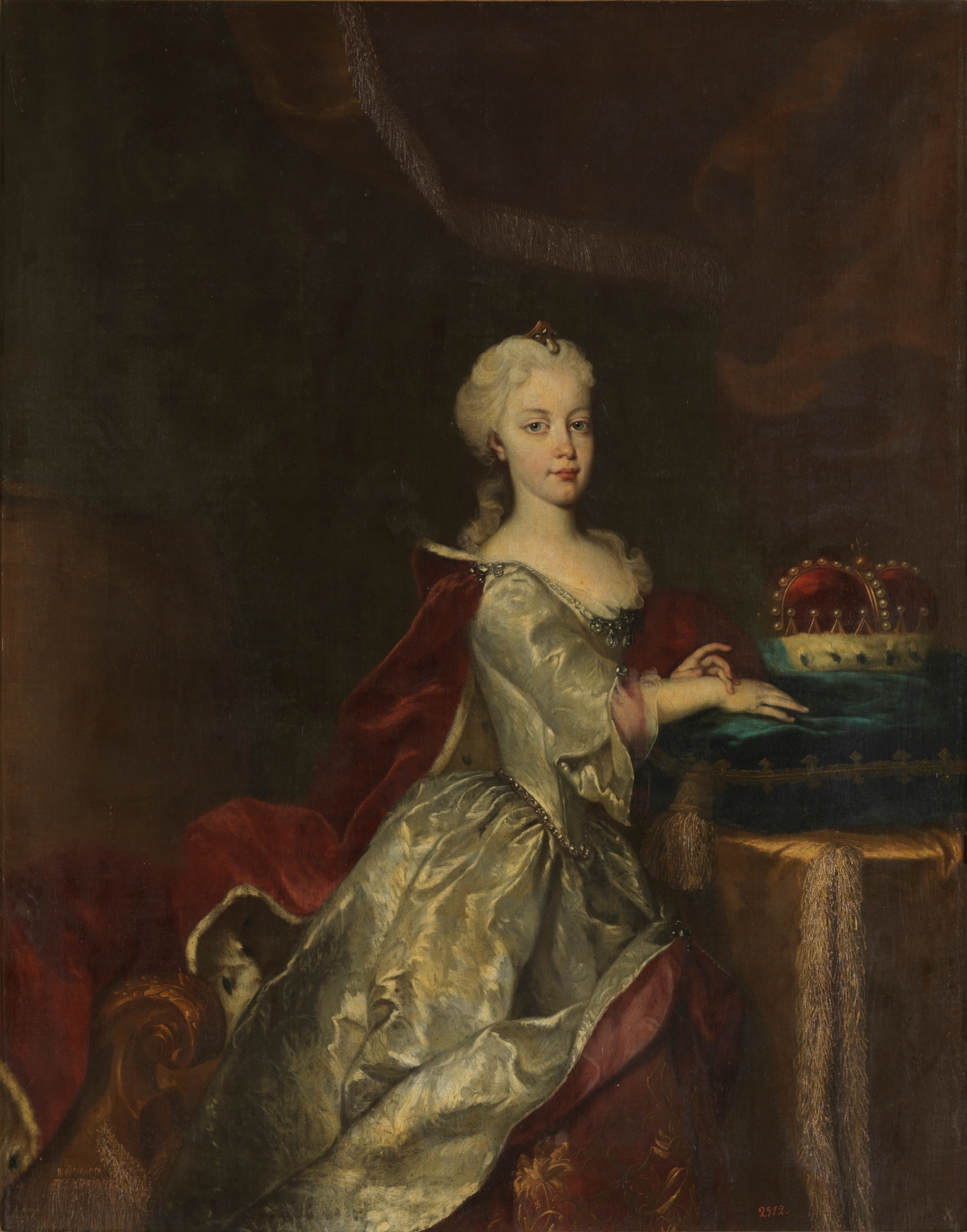
Archduchess Maria Theresa, c. 1724, Prado Museum, Madrid

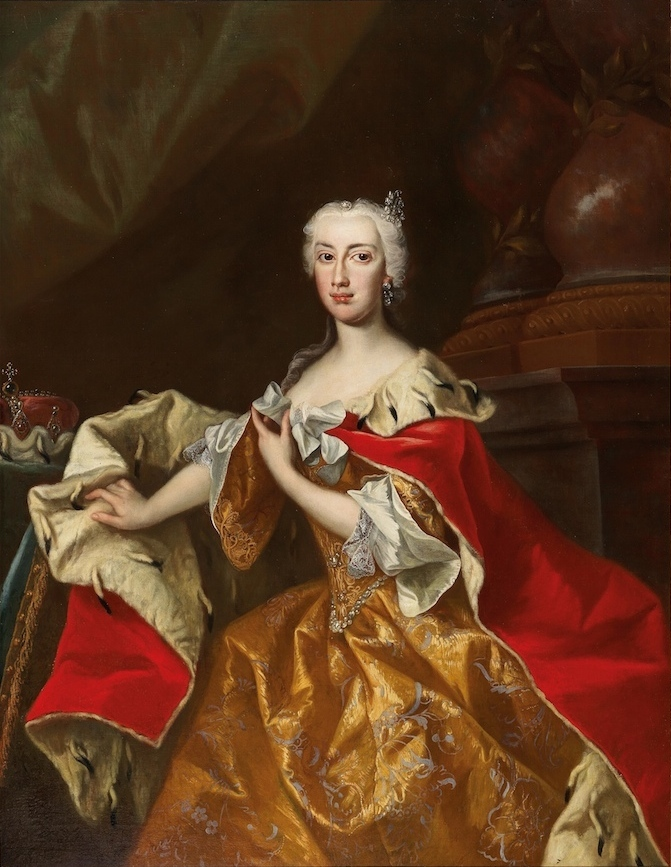
Archduchess Maria Anna, 1744, property of the Royal House of Hanover

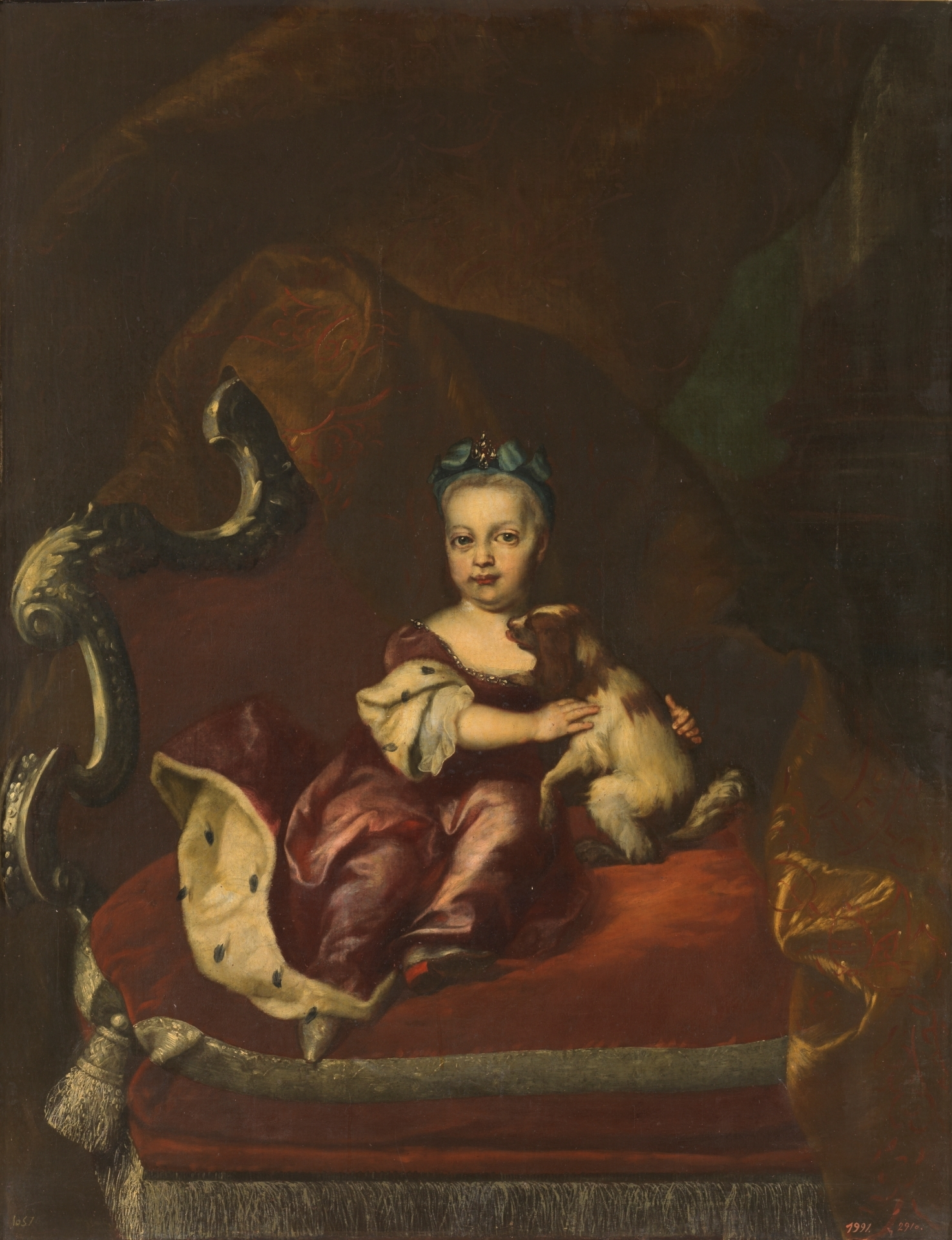
Archduchess Maria Amalia, 1724, Prado Museum, Madrid

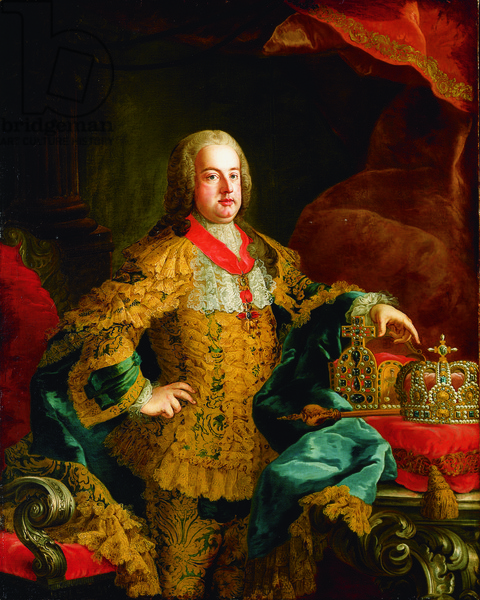
Emperor Franz I, 1752, Private collection

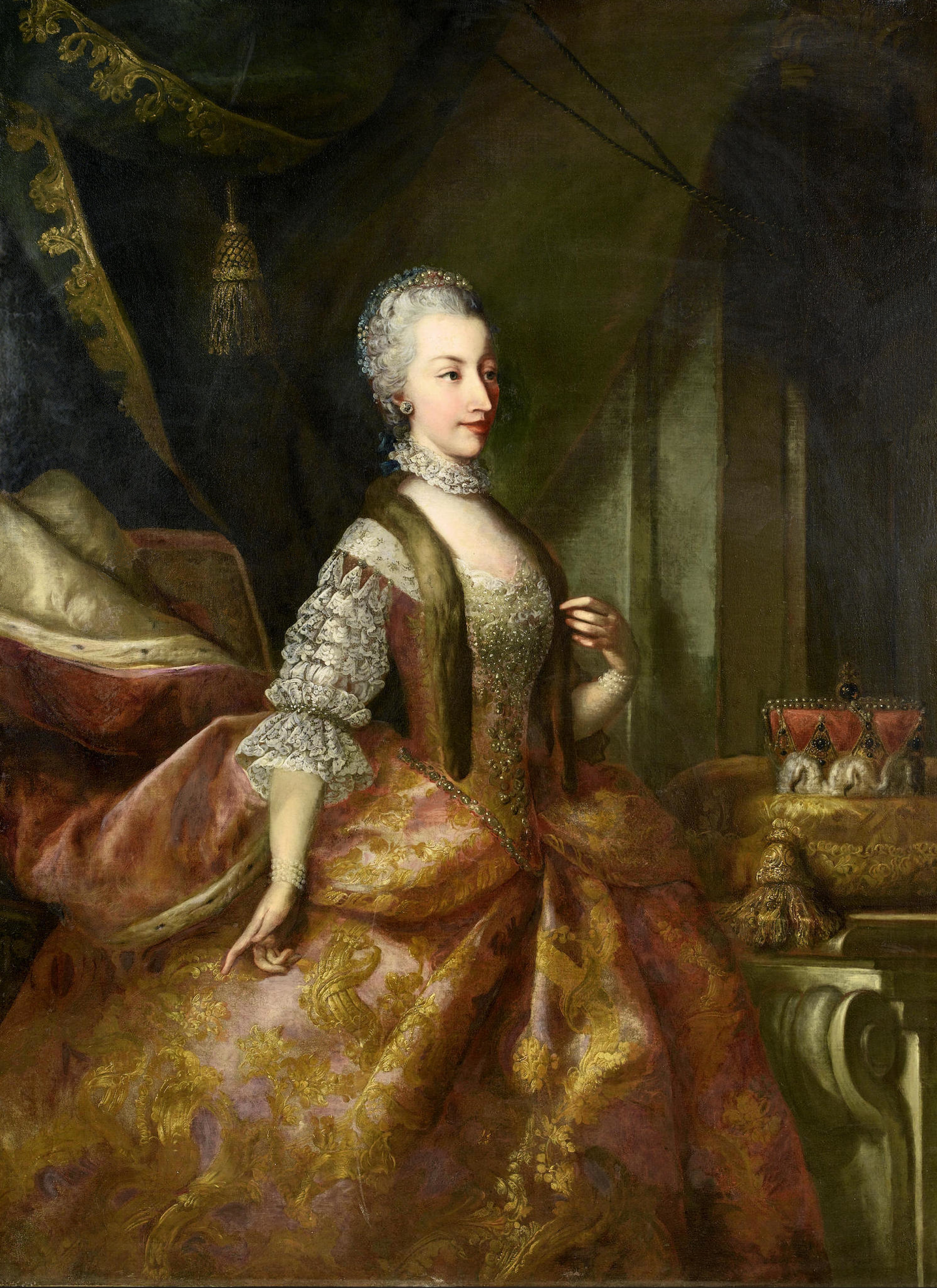
Portrait of an Archduchess of Austria, possibly Maria Amalia, Duchess of Parma, Maria Josepha, Queen of Poland, or Maria Amalia, Holy Roman Empress, before 1753, unidentified location

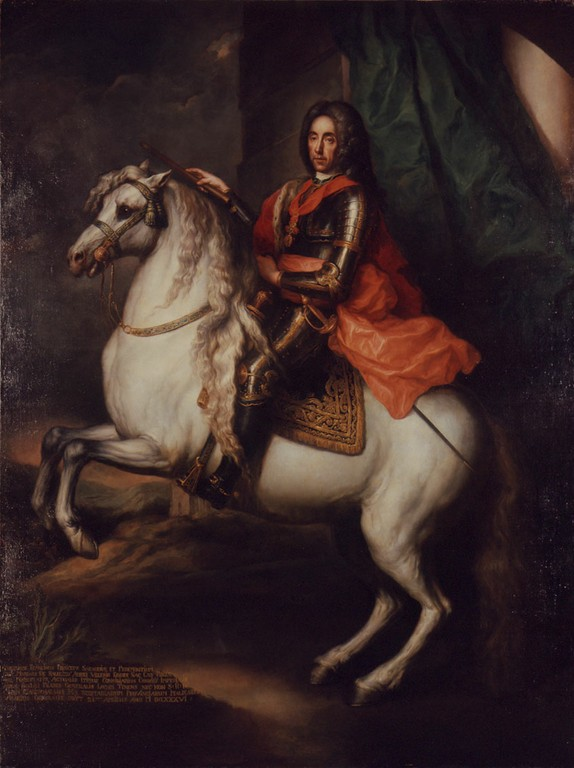
Eugen von Savoyen, or Eugene of Savoy, c. 1725, Heeresgeschichtliches Museum, Vienna
