= Archduke Leopold Johann of Austria =

Last-born male of the House of Habsburg

Archduke Leopold Johann of Austria (13 April 1716 – 4 November 1716), was the last-born male descendant from the House of Habsburg. The only son and long-hoped heir of Charles VI, Holy Roman Emperor, with his death in infancy and his father's death in 1740, the Habsburg male line died out completely. It was succeeded by the House of Habsburg-Lorraine (originated by the marriage of Leopold Johann's younger sister Maria Theresa and Francis III Stephen, Duke of Lorraine) who ruled the Habsburg domains until their dethronement following World War I in 1918.

== Birth and baptism ==
Charles VI, Holy Roman Emperor and his wife Elisabeth Christine of Brunswick-Wolfenbüttel had been married for seven years when the Empress' first pregnancy was confirmed. Elisabeth Christine was under immense pressure to produce a male heir; she underwent numerous treatments to cure her supposed inability to have children. Among other things, she undertook pilgrimages to Mariazell, cures in Karlsbad, a wine cure (court doctors prescribed large doses of liquor to make her more fertile, which gave her face a permanent blush) and visit to clairvoyants and astrologers. The imperial bedchamber was even painted with erotic male scenes on the walls and ceiling to stimulate her to produce a son.

The birth of Leopold Johann on 13 April 1716 at 7:30 p.m. was celebrated with great pomp in the style of the Spanish court ceremonial. At that time Austria, along with the Republic of Venice, was at war against the Turks. As the heir to the throne of the Habsburg dynasty, he received the Order of the Golden Fleece at birth, since his father himself was Grand Master of the Order in Austria. The solemn baptism took place the next day in the Knights' Hall (Rittersaal) of the Hofburg with water from the Jordan River in the Holy Land. The infant's full name Leopold Johann Anton Joseph Franz de Paula Hermengild Rudolph Ignatius Balthasar refers to the Habsburg family tradition and the veneration of saints of the time. The ceremony was performed by the Papal Nuncio together with the Cathedral Provost of St. Stephen's Cathedral and the Abbot of the Schottenstift. Also present were the Archbishop of Prague, Franz Ferdinand von Kuenburg, and the Archbishop of Valencia, Antonio Folc de Cardona, as well as eight other bishops and nine abbots. The godfather was King John V of Portugal, who was married to Maria Anna of Austria, Charles VI's sister. The Portuguese monarch was represented by the Imperial Field Marshal and Prince Maximilian William of Brunswick-Lüneburg.

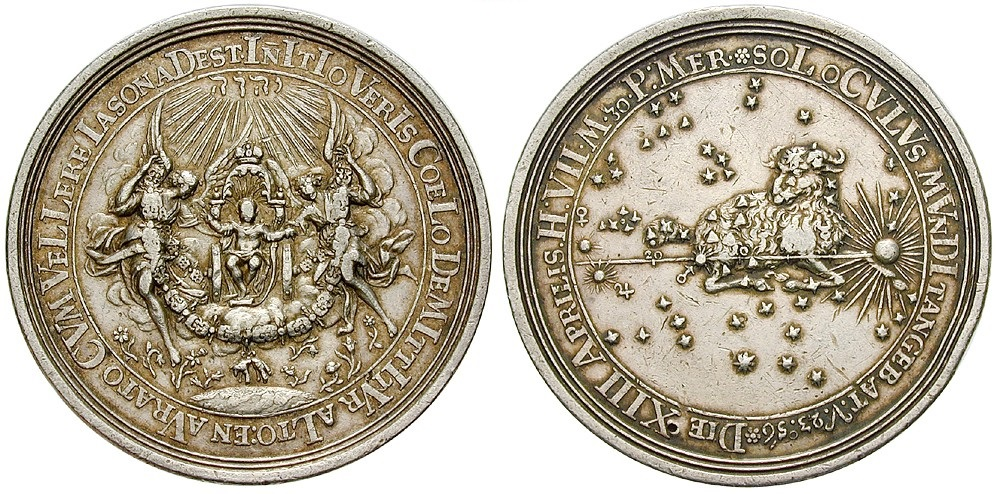
Commemorative medal on occasion of the birth of Archduke Leopold Johann.

On the occasion of the birth, Charles VI commissioned a valuable medal. The translation of the Latin transcription reads:

"At the beginning of spring they are sent down from high heaven. Jason of the Golden Fleece is present / The sun, the eye of the world, reached an altitude of 23° 56' on 13 April 13 at 7:30 p.m."

A medal was also made by Elisabeth Christine, which was created by Georg Wilhelm Vestner. The important Austrian baroque composer Johann Joseph Fux wrote the opera Angelica vincitrice di Alcina to celebrate the birth, which was first performed on 14 September 1716. The set was designed by the stage designer Giuseppe Galli da Bibiena, who placed the stage on two islands in a pond in the Favorita park. In addition to the imperial couple, the court and numerous ambassadors attended the premiere. Georg Philipp Telemann also composed homage music for the birth of Leopold Johann, which was first performed at Frankfurt in 1716.

In June 1716 Reinhard Keiser staged the musical comedy and dance play Das Römische April-Fest (The Roman April Festival) on the occasion of the birth of the heir to the throne. Barthold Feind wrote the libretto. In addition, numerous works were printed across the Holy Roman Empire in homage to the archduke.

== Death and burial ==
The ailing Leopold Johann died in Vienna on 4 November 1716 aged seven months. The hope that the child would remain healthy, since there was no close relationship between his mother Elisabeth Christine and the imperial family (which was not a matter of course in the marriage policy of the House of Habsburg), was not fulfilled. Charles VI was deeply affected by the death of his son, as evidenced by the lack of entries in his diaries from the death of Leopold Johann until the end of 1716.

The burial was based on the 1668 burial ceremony of Archduke Ferdinand Wenzel (28 September 1667 – 13 January 1668), the first-born son of Leopold I, Holy Roman Emperor. On the morning of 5 November 1716, the body was buried in the presence of the Oberhofmeister Anton Florian, Prince of Liechtenstein, the Lady-in-waiting Sabine Christina, Countess of Starhemberg, three imperial physicians and the body surgeon Heinrich Cöster, who opened the corpse for conservation. The internal organs and the heart were removed and the corpse was embalmed. The child's body was then placed on a catafalque in the Antecamera, the Virtue Hall (Tugendsaal) of the Hofburg, and blessed by the court and Imperial Court and Castle priest (K.u.k. Hof- und Burgpfarre). He wore a crown of flowers and around his neck the small chain of the Order of the Golden Fleece. The large fleece necklace and the Archducal hat lay on a silver cushion.

The silver urn containing the heart and the copper urn with the entrails were taken to St. Stephen's Cathedral in Vienna on the same day and placed in the Ducal Crypt. In the evening at 11:00 p.m. the body was consecrated again and led with a large entourage to the Capuchin Church. The coffin was blessed for the last time and opened in the presence of the Oberhofmeister and the Oberkammerer to show the body. Six Capuchin priests then brought the coffin into the Imperial Crypt.

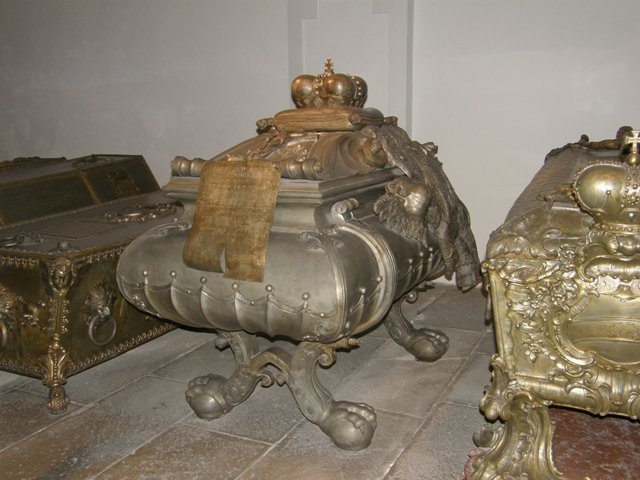
Sarcophagus of Archduke Leopold Johann, Imperial Crypt, Vienna.

Today's sarcophagus of Leopold Johann in the Imperial Crypt was built in 1740 according to the instructions of Charles VI. Made as an overcoffin for the original coffin, it was intended to be reminiscent of ancient models. A fold of ermine mantle covers the ornamented lid and on top of it, on a cushion, is the Archducal hat. The coffin was made of tin. The long sides are decorated with angels' heads with spread wings, the coffin itself rests on four bear paws. It was probably created by the Salzburg tin master Hans Georg Lehrl. At the base under a crucifix is a rolled up tablet. The inscription, written in Latin, reads in translation:

"Dedicated to Christian posterity. Here rests in the ashes Leopold, the son of the exalted Emperor Charles VI. and grandson of the great Leopold, Archduke of Austria and Prince of Asturias, (Note: The Prince of Asturias title mentioned here was a one in pretense, since Austria lost the Spanish throne with the end of the War of the Spanish Succession and according to the provisions of the Treaty of Rastatt on 7 March 1714, but never gave up the claim to it.) whom the heavens only showed the world on 13 April 1716, and took back again, to unspeakable sadness, on 4 November of the same year. Oh! the Emperor's pain is easier to guess than to describe in words".

After the death of their son, the imperial couple donated, as a sign of their piety, a baby Jesus in silver to the Mother of God of Mariazell at the place of grace, which corresponded to the weight of the deceased child.

== Bibliography ==
- Bankl, Hans [in German] (2005). Die kranken Habsburger. Befunde und Befindlichkeiten einer Herrscherdynastie (in German). Munich: Goldmann. ISBN 978-3-442-15360-2.
- Hawlik-van de Water, Magdalena (1989). Der schöne Tod. Zeremonialstrukturen des Wiener Hofes bei Tod und Begräbnis zwischen 1640 und 1740 (in German). Vienna: Herder. ISBN 978-3-210-24945-2.
- Hawlik-van de Water, Magdalena (1993). Die Kapuzinergruft. Begräbnisstätte der Habsburger in Wien (in German). Vienna: Herder. ISBN 978-3-210-25151-6.
- Hirschmann, Wolfgang (2000). Peter Cahn [in German] (ed.). Musikalische Festkultur im politisch-sozialen und liturgisch-religiösen Kontext. Telemanns Serenata und Kirchenmusik zur Geburt des Erzherzogs Leopold (Frankfurt 1716) (in German). Mainz: Schott Music. ISBN 978-3-7957-1337-9.
- Ingrao, Charles W.; Thomas, Andrew L. (2004). "Piety and Power: The Empresses-Consort of the High Baroque". In Campbell Orr, Clarissa (ed.). Queenship in Europe 1660-1815: The Role of the Consort. Cambridge University Press. pp. 107–130. ISBN 0-521-81422-7.
- Kolb, Johann Christoph (1716). Das Frolockende Augspurg. Wie solches wegen der höchst-beglückten Geburt deß Durchleuchtigsten Ertz-Hertzogen und Printzen von Asturien Leopoldi II. Seine allerunterthänigste Freude den 17. May 1716. durch verschiedene Illuminationes dargestellt hat (in German). Augsburg: Maschenbauer.
- Mändl, Kaspar (1716). Vollkomne Freud Deß erhörten Europa. Vorgetragen in einer Jubel- Lob- und Ehren-Predig, Zu unterthänigisten Ehren Deß Durchleuchtigisten Königlichen Printzen, Ertz-Hertzogen von Oesterreich und Printzen von Asturien, c. c. (in German). Augsburg: Labhart.
- Schönwetter, Johann Baptist (1716). Beschreibung Der am 13. April 1716. glücklichst beschehenen Entbindung Ihrer Majestät, der Regierenden Kayserin, Und des andern Tags, dahier, In Der Käyserlichen Burg Prächtigst-vollbrachten Tauff-Ceremonien Des Durchläuchtigsten Printzen Leopold, Ertz-Hertzogen von Oesterreich, und Printzen von Asturien (in German). Freystadt: Adolphi.
- Schwennicke, Detlev, ed. (2005). Die fränkischen Könige und die Könige und Kaiser, Stammesherzoge und Kurfürsten, Markgrafen und Herzoge des Heiligen Römischen Reiches Deutscher Nation | Europäische Stammtafeln (in German). Vol. I. Frankfurt. ISBN 978-3-465-03420-9.
- Seitschek, Stefan; Hutterer, Herbert; Theimer, Gerald (2011). 300 Jahre Karl VI. 1711–1740. Spuren der Herrschaft des letzten Habsburgers (in German). Vienna: Österreichisches Staatsarchiv. Archived from the original on 2013-05-11.
- Wolfsgruber, Cölestin (1887). Die Kaisergruft bei den Kapuzinern in Wien (in German). Vienna: Alfred Hölder.
- Bey Der Höchsterwünschtesten Gebuhrt Des Durchlauchtigsten Kayser- und Königl. Printzen Leopoldi, Josephi, Josephi, Johannis, Antonii, Francisci De Paula, Hermenegildi, Rudolphi, Ignatii, Balthasaris, Ertz-Hertzogs von Oesterreich. (in German). Breslau 1716.
