= Charles VI, Holy Roman Emperor =

Holy Roman Emperor from 1711 to 1740

Charles VI
- Imperator Romanorum
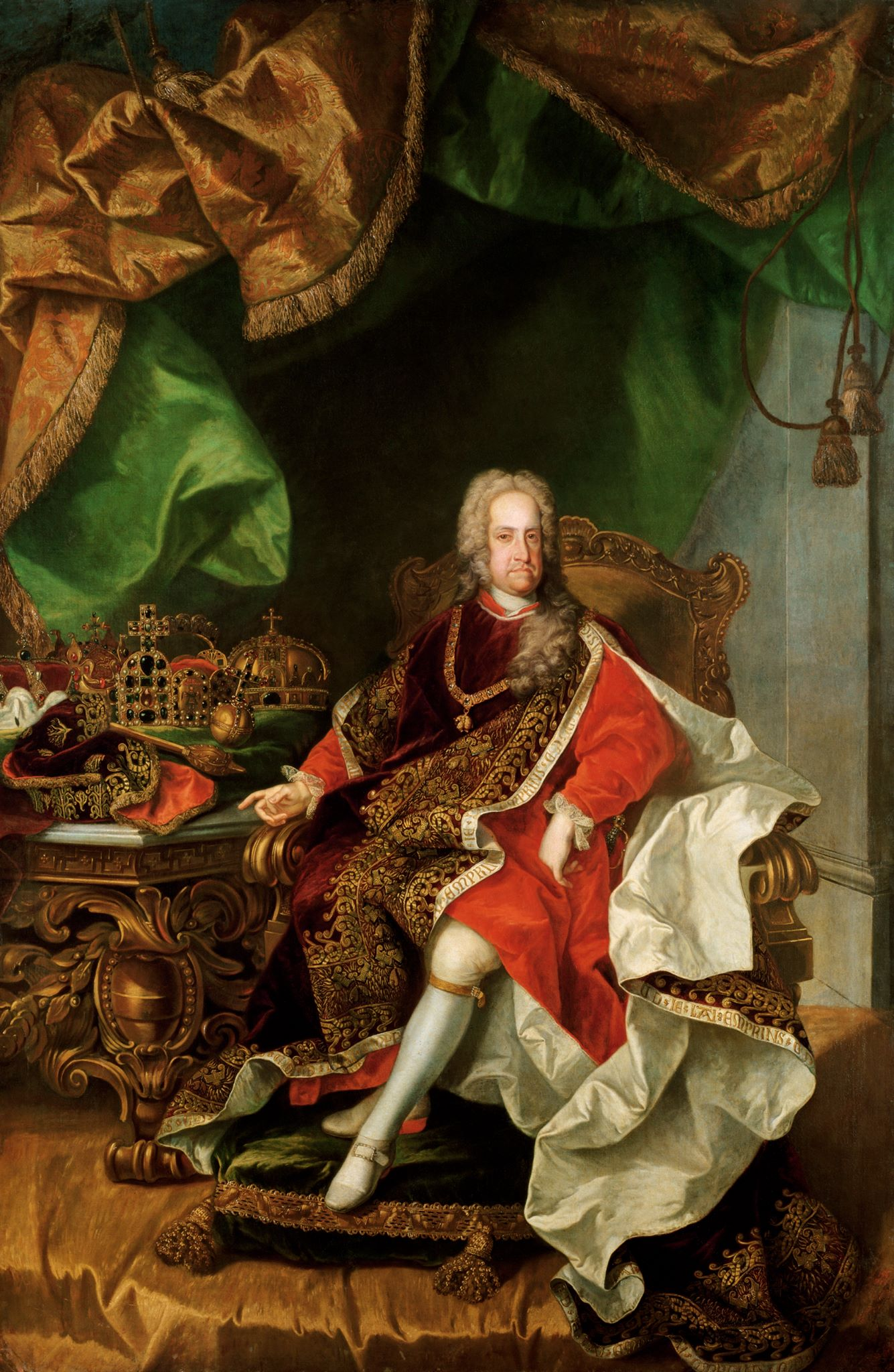
- Portrait by Johann Auerbach, c. 1730–1739

Holy Roman Emperor
- Reign: 12 October 1711 – 20 October 1740
- Coronation: 22 December 1711; Frankfurt Cathedral
- Predecessor: Joseph I
- Successor: Charles VII

Archduke of Austria, King of Hungary, Croatia; and Bohemia
- Reign: 17 April 1711 – 20 October 1740
- Coronation: 22 May 1712
- Predecessor: Joseph I
- Successor: Maria Theresa
- Born: 1 October 1685; Hofburg Palace, Vienna, Austria, Holy Roman Empire
- Died: 20 October 1740 (aged 55); Hofburg Palace, Vienna, Austria, Holy Roman Empire
- Burial: Imperial Crypt
- Spouse: Elisabeth Christine of Brunswick (m. 1708)
- Issue Detail: Archduke Leopold Johann; Maria Theresa, Holy Roman Empress; Archduchess Maria Anna; Archduchess Maria Amalia
Names
- German: Karl Franz Joseph Wenzel Balthasar Johann Anton Ignaz
- House: Habsburg
- Father: Leopold I, Holy Roman Emperor
- Mother: Eleonore Magdalene of Neuburg
- Religion: Catholic Church

Charles VI (German: Karl; Latin: Carolus; 1 October 1685 – 20 October 1740) was Holy Roman Emperor and ruler of the Austrian Habsburg monarchy from 1711 until his death, succeeding his elder brother, Joseph I. He unsuccessfully claimed the throne of Spain following the death of his relative Charles II of Spain. In 1708, he married Elisabeth Christine of Brunswick-Wolfenbüttel, by whom he had his four children: Leopold Johann (who died in infancy), Maria Theresa, Maria Anna (Governess of the Austrian Netherlands), and Maria Amalia (who also died in infancy).

Four years before the birth of Maria Theresa, faced with his lack of male heirs, Charles provided for a male-line succession failure with the Pragmatic Sanction of 1713. The Emperor favoured his own daughters over those of his elder brother and predecessor, Joseph I, in the succession, ignoring the Mutual Pact of Succession he had signed during the reign of his father, Leopold I. Charles sought the other European powers' approval. They demanded significant terms, among which were that Austria close the Ostend Company. In total, the states of Great Britain, France, Saxony-Poland, the Dutch Republic, Spain, Venice, the Papal States, Prussia, Russia, Denmark, Savoy-Sardinia, and Bavaria, plus the Diet of the Holy Roman Empire, recognised the sanction. France, Spain, Saxony-Poland, Bavaria, and Prussia later reneged. Charles died in 1740, sparking the War of the Austrian Succession, which plagued his successor, Maria Theresa, for eight years. His death without male heirs also resulted in the complete extinction of the male line in the Habsburg dynasty.

== Biography ==
=== Early years ===
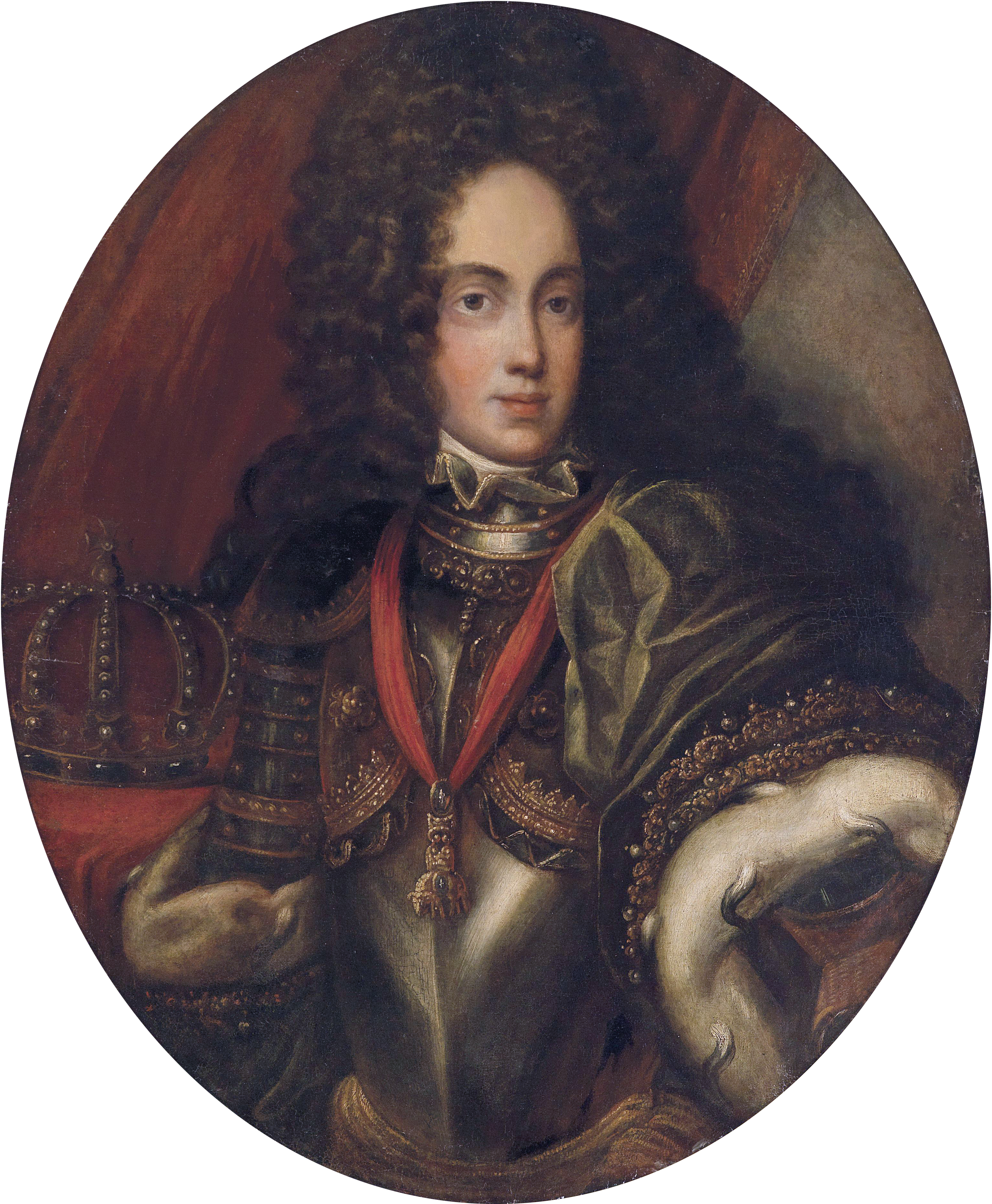
The future Emperor Charles VI

Archduke Charles (baptised Carolus Franciscus Josephus Wenceslaus Balthasar Johannes Antonius Ignatius), the second son of the Emperor Leopold I and of his third wife, Princess Eleonore Magdalene of Neuburg, was born on 1 October 1685.

Following the death of Charles II of Spain in 1700, without any direct heir, Charles declared himself King of Spain — both were members of the House of Habsburg. The ensuing War of the Spanish Succession, which pitted France's candidate, Philip, Duke of Anjou, Louis XIV of France's grandson, against Austria's Charles, lasted for almost 14 years. The kingdoms of Portugal, England, Scotland, Ireland and the majority of the Holy Roman Empire endorsed Charles's candidature. Within Spain his supporters were concentrated in the Crown of Aragon where there was a fear of Bourbon centralism. Charles III, as he was known, disembarked in his kingdom in 1705 and stayed there for six years, only being able to exercise his rule in the Principality of Catalonia until the death of his brother, Joseph I, Holy Roman Emperor; he returned to Vienna to assume the imperial crown.

Not wanting to see Austria and Spain in personal union again, the new Kingdom of Great Britain withdrew its support from the Austrian coalition, and the war culminated with the Treaties of Utrecht, Rastatt and Baden three years later. The former, ratified in 1713, recognised Philip as King of Spain; however, the Kingdom of Naples, the Duchy of Milan, the Austrian Netherlands and the Kingdom of Sardinia — all previously possessions of the Spanish — were ceded to Austria. To prevent a union of Spain and France, Philip was forced to renounce his right to succeed his grandfather's throne. Charles was extremely discontented at the loss of Spain, and as a result, he mimicked the staid Spanish Habsburg court ceremonial, adopting the dress of a Spanish monarch, which, according to British historian Edward Crankshaw, consisted of "a black doublet and hose, black shoes and scarlet stockings".

Charles's father and his advisors went about arranging a marriage for him. Their eyes fell upon Elisabeth Christine of Brunswick-Wolfenbüttel, the eldest child of Louis Rudolph, Duke of Brunswick-Wolfenbüttel. She was held to be strikingly beautiful by her contemporaries.

=== Succession to the Habsburg dominions ===
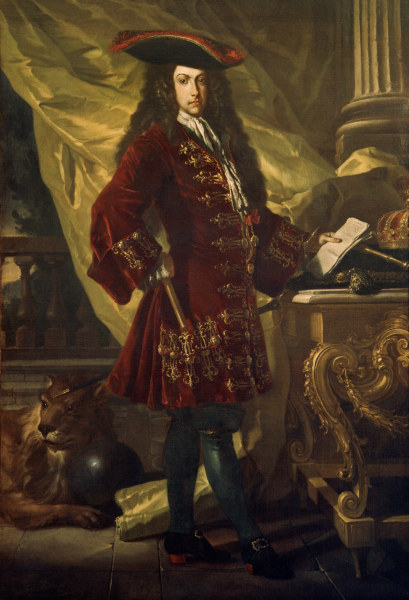
Portrait of a young Archduke Charles during the War of the Spanish Succession

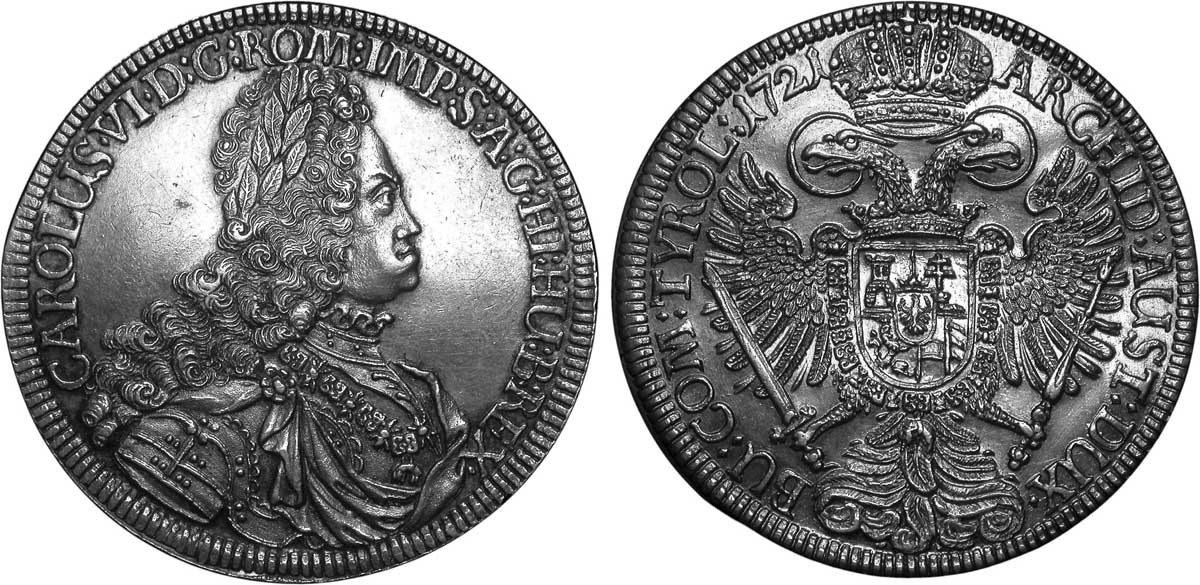
Charles VI on a silver Thaler, 1721

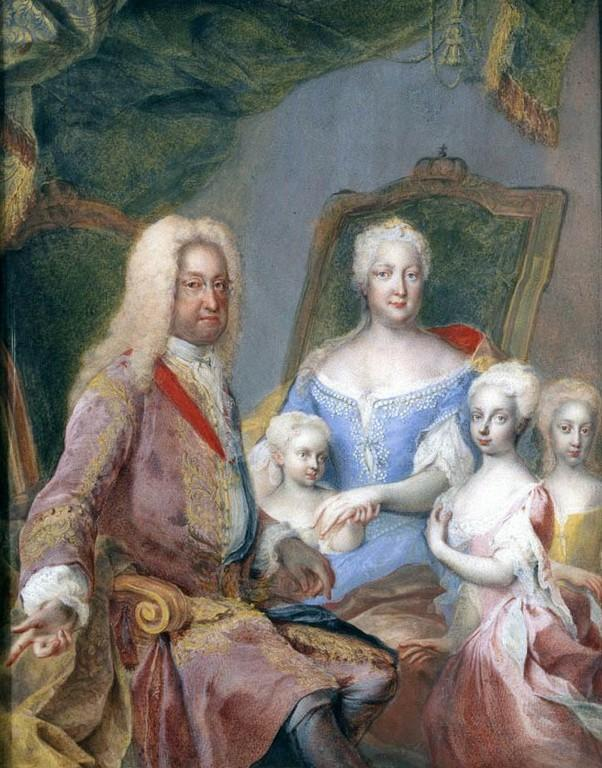
Charles VI with his wife Empress Elisabeth Christine and their daughters in 1730

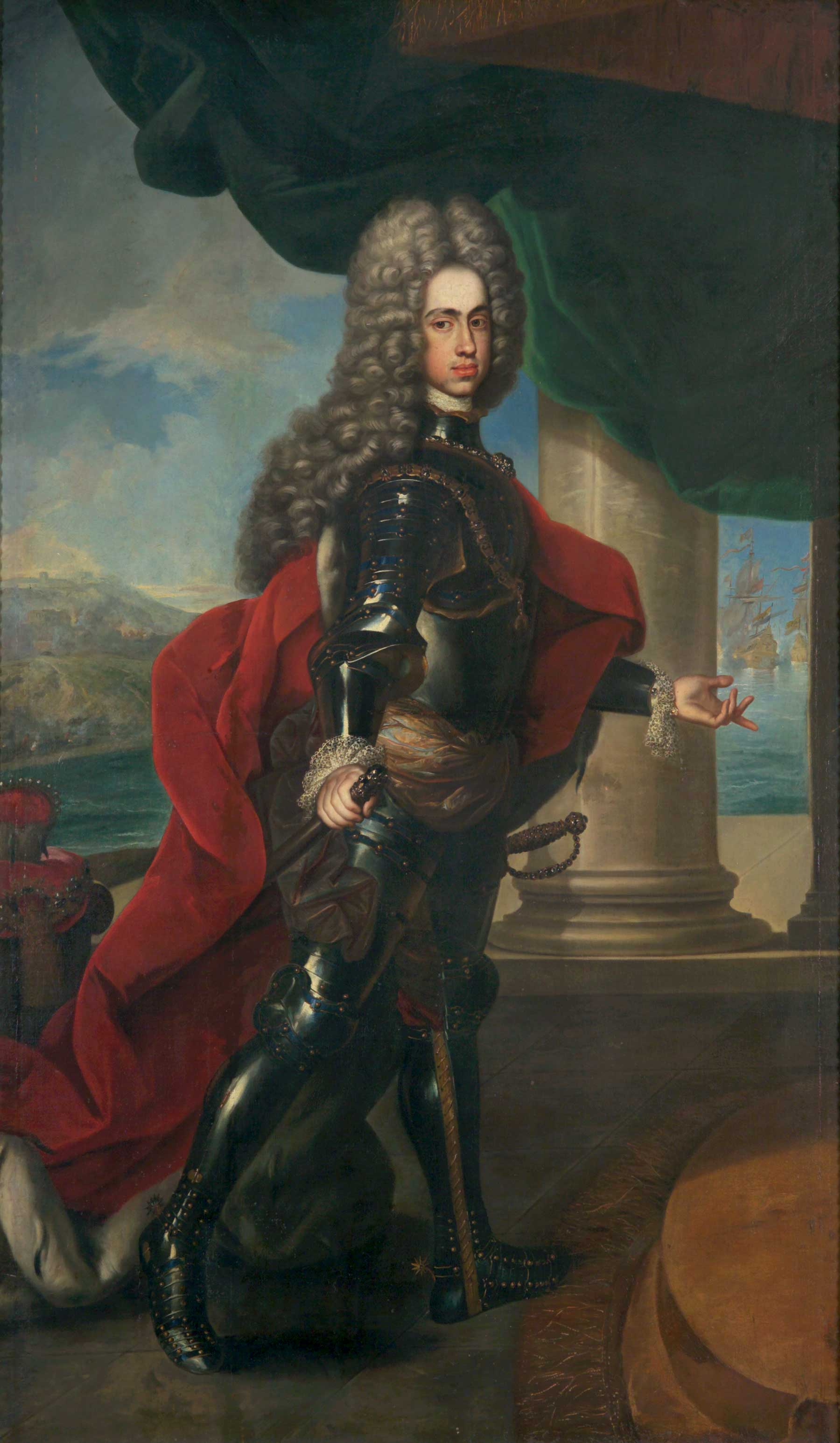
Charles III in front of the port of Barcelona by Frans van Stampart

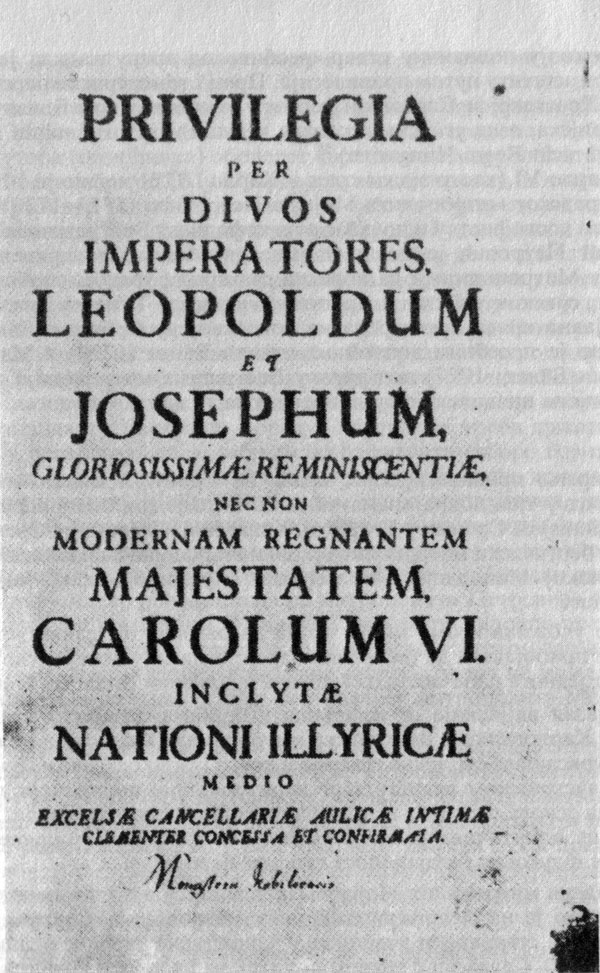
Collection of Serbian privileges, issued by Charles VI in 1732

When Charles succeeded his brother in 1711, he was the last male Habsburg heir in the direct line. Since Habsburg possessions were subject to Salic law, barring women from inheriting in their own right, his own lack of a male heir meant they would be divided on his death. The Pragmatic Sanction of 19 April 1713 abolished male-only succession in all Habsburg realms and declared their lands indivisible, although the Diet of Hungary only approved it in 1723.

Charles had three daughters, Maria Theresa (1717–1780), Maria Anna (1718–1744) and Maria Amalia (1724–1730), but no surviving sons. When Maria Theresa was born, he disinherited his nieces, who were the daughters of his elder brother Joseph I, Maria Josepha and Maria Amalia. It was this act that undermined the chances of a smooth succession as set out in a Pact arranged by his father, and obliged Charles to spend the rest of his reign seeking to ensure enforcement of the sanction from other European powers.

Charles agreed to a demand from Britain that he close a trading company, the Ostend Company, which was based in the Austrian Netherlands and which he himself had founded in 1722. Other signatories included Britain, France, the Dutch Republic, Spain, Russia, Denmark-Norway and Savoy-Sardinia, but subsequent events underlined Prince Eugene of Savoy's comment that the best guarantee was a powerful army and full treasury. Charles's nieces were married to the rulers of Saxony and Bavaria, both of whom ultimately refused to be bound by the decision of the Imperial Diet. France, despite publicly agreeing to the Pragmatic Sanction in 1735, signed a secret treaty with Bavaria in 1738 promising to back the "just claims" of Charles Albert of Bavaria.

In the first part of his reign, the Habsburg monarchy continued to expand thanks to the success in the Austro-Turkish War (1716–1718), adding Banat to Hungary and establishing direct Austrian rule over Serbia and Oltenia (Lesser Wallachia). This extended the Austrian rule to the lower Danube.

The War of the Quadruple Alliance (1718–1720) followed. It too ended in an Austrian victory; by the Treaty of The Hague (1720), Charles swapped Sardinia, which went to the Duke of Savoy, Victor Amadeus II, for Sicily, the largest island in the Mediterranean, which was harder to defend than Sardinia. The treaty also recognised Philip V of Spain's younger son, Don Carlos (the future Charles III of Spain) as heir to the Duchy of Parma and Grand Duchy of Tuscany; Charles had previously endorsed the succession of the incumbent Grand Duke's daughter, Anna Maria Luisa, Electress Palatine.

Peace in Europe was shattered by the War of the Polish Succession (1733–1738), a dispute over the throne of Poland between Augustus of Saxony, the previous king's elder son, and Stanisław Leszczyński. Austria supported the former, France the latter; thus, a war broke out. By the Treaty of Vienna (1738), Augustus ascended the throne, but Charles had to give the kingdoms of Naples and Sicily to Don Carlos in exchange for the much smaller Duchy of Parma and Grand Duchy of Tuscany.

The question of Charles's elder daughter's marriage was raised early in her childhood. She was first betrothed to Léopold Clément of Lorraine, who was supposed to come to Vienna and meet Maria Theresa. Instead, he died of smallpox in 1723, which upset Maria Theresa. Léopold Clément's younger brother, Francis Stephen, then came to Vienna to replace him. Charles considered other possibilities (such as Don Carlos) before announcing the engagement to Francis. At the end of the War of the Polish Succession, France demanded that Francis surrender the Duchy of Lorraine (his hereditary domain) to Stanisław Leszczyński, the deposed king of Poland, who would bequeath it to France at his death. Charles compelled Francis Stephen (duke of Lorraine of 1729-1737) to renounce his rights to Lorraine and told him: "No renunciation, no archduchess."

Charles had a number of sexual relationships with male courtiers, including his Master of the Horse, Prince Schwarzenberg, and a hunter's boy. The love of his life was Michael Joseph, Count Althann, a groom of the bedchamber, whom he called "my only heart, my comfort [...] my soul mate", and with whom he slept regularly. Althann's death in 1722, after a relationship of nineteen years, devastated him.

In 1737, the Emperor embarked on another Turkish War, in alliance with Russia. Its start was promising. Already in the autumn of the same year, imperial troops took Niš and tried to consolidate gains in 1738, but during the next year, Habsburg armies suffered several defeats. By the Treaty of Belgrade (1739), Emperor Charles had to cede several regions to the sultan, including the Bosnian section of Posavina, the central regions of Serbia, and Wallachia Minor (Oltenia). Popular discontent at the costly war reigned in Vienna; Francis of Lorraine, Maria Theresa's husband, was dubbed a French spy by the Viennese.

=== Religious policies ===
As a devout Catholic, Emperor Charles supported the reestablishment of Catholic ecclesiastical structures in various regions that were liberated from Ottoman rule and incorporated into the Habsburg Monarchy by the Treaty of Passarowitz (1718). At the same time, several questions related to the rights and liberties of other Christian denominations were regulated. In the Kingdom of Hungary, a significant portion of both nobility and people belonged to the Reformed Church (Calvinists), while eastern and southern regions were also inhabited by Eastern Orthodox Christians, mainly Serbs and Romanians. On several occasions, Emperor Charles issued confirmations of old privileges that were granted to Eastern Orthodox subjects by previous Habsburg monarchs (Emperors Leopold I and Joseph I), and in 1732, an official collection of those documents was published.

=== Death and legacy ===
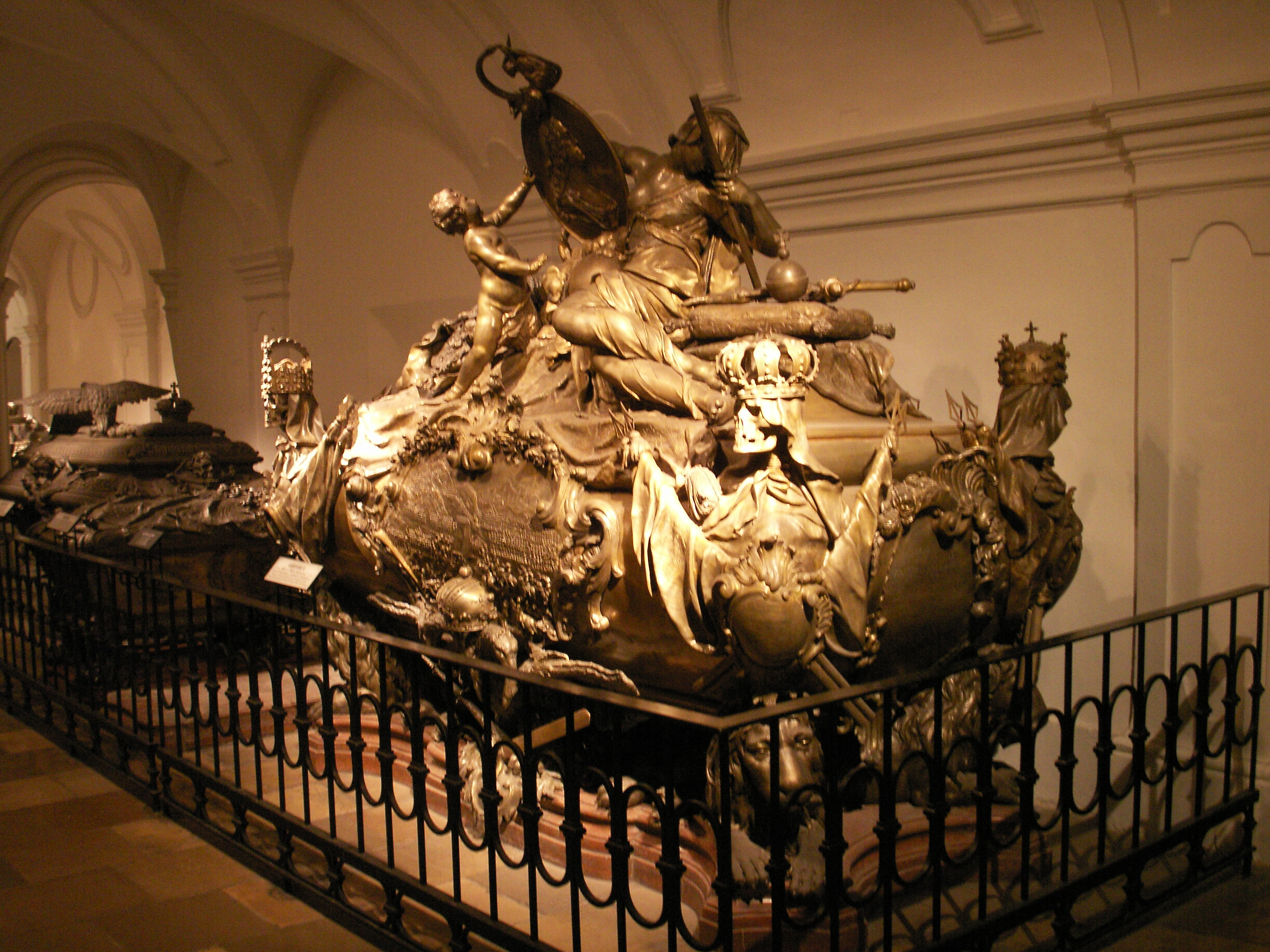
Tomb of the emperor in the Imperial Crypt, Vienna

The Emperor, after a hunting trip across the Hungarian border in "a typical day in the wettest and coldest October in memory", (Note: Edward Crankshaw: Maria Theresa, A & C Black, 2011. And also: « [...] after a day of hunting, the emperor fell ill with a cold and fever. Upon his return to his hunting lodge, Charles requested his cook to prepare for him his favourite dish of mushrooms. Soon after eating them, he fell violently ill. His physicians bled him but to no avail » (Julia P. Gelardi: In Triumph's Wake: Royal Mothers, Tragic Daughters, and the Price They Paid for Glory, Macmillan, 2009).) fell seriously ill at the Favorita Palace, Vienna, and he died on 20 October 1740 in the Hofburg. (Note: In the first days of October 1740, in a cold day of pouring rain Emperor Charles VI, « in spite of the warnings of his physicians » (Eliakim Littell, Robert S. Littell: Littell's Living Age, Volume 183, T. H. Carter & Company, 1889, p. 69), went to hunting ducks on the shores of Lake Neusiedl, close to the Hungarian border and he had come back chilled and soaked through to his little country palace at La Favorita; on his return, though he was feverish and suffering from colic, the Emperor persisted in eating one of his favourite dishes, a Catalan mushroom stew (« a large dish of fried mushrooms » for the Littell brothers), prepared by his cook. He spent the night between 10 and 11 October vomiting. The following morning, he was gravely ill, brought down by a high fever. Carried slowly to Vienna in a padded carriage, he died in the Hofburg nine days after.) In his Memoirs Voltaire (Note: « Charles the Sixth died, in the month of October 1740, of an indigestion, occasioned by eating champignons, which brought on an apoplexy, and this plate of champignons changed the destiny of Europe » (Voltaire: Memoirs of the Life of Voltaire, 1784; pp. 48–49).) wrote that Charles died after consuming a meal of death cap mushrooms. Charles's life opus, the Pragmatic sanction, was ultimately in vain. Maria Theresa was forced to resort to arms to defend her inheritance from the coalition of Prussia, Bavaria, France, Spain, Saxony and Poland — all parties to the sanction — who assaulted the Austrian frontier weeks after her father's death. During the ensuing War of the Austrian Succession, Maria Theresa saved her crown and most of her territory but lost the mineral-rich Duchy of Silesia to Prussia and the Duchy of Parma to Spain.

At the time of Charles's death, the Habsburg lands were saturated in debt; the exchequer contained a mere 100,000 florins; and desertion was rife in Austria's sporadic army, spread across the Empire in small, ineffective barracks. Contemporaries expected that Hungary would wrench itself from the Habsburg yoke upon his death.

Emperor Charles VI has been the main motif of many collectors' coins and medals. One of the most recent samples is a high-value collectors' coin, the Austrian Göttweig Abbey commemorative coin, minted on 11 October 2006. His portrait can be seen in the foreground of the reverse of the coin.

== Children ==
Name	Portrait	Lifespan	Notes
Leopold Johann		13 April 1716 – 4 November 1716	Archduke of Austria, died aged seven months
Maria Theresa		13 May 1717 – 29 November 1780	Archduchess of Austria and heiress of the Habsburg dynasty, married Francis III Stephen, Duke of Lorraine (later Francis I, Holy Roman Emperor) and had issue; succeeded by the House of Habsburg-Lorraine
Maria Anna		14 September 1718 – 16 December 1744	Archduchess of Austria, married Prince Charles Alexander of Lorraine, with whom she served as Governess of the Austrian Netherlands. Died in childbirth
Maria Amalia		5 April 1724 – 19 April 1730	Archduchess of Austria, died aged six

== Heraldry ==
Heraldry of Charles VI, Holy Roman Emperor

Coat of arms as Holy Roman Emperor (1711–1740)	Coat of arms as Claimant to the Throne of Spain	Coat of arms as Claimant to the Throne of Spain in Aragon	Coat of arms as King of Naples & Sicily

== Ancestors ==
Ancestors of Charles VI, Holy Roman Emperor

8. Ferdinand II, Holy Roman Emperor
4. Ferdinand III, Holy Roman Emperor
9. Maria Anna of Bavaria
2. Leopold I, Holy Roman Emperor
10. Philip III of Spain
5. Maria Anna of Spain
11. Margaret of Austria, Queen of Spain
1. Charles VI, Holy Roman Emperor
12. Wolfgang Wilhelm, Count Palatine of Neuburg
6. Philip William, Elector Palatine
13. Magdalene of Bavaria
3. Eleonore Magdalene of Neuburg
14. George II, Landgrave of Hesse-Darmstadt
7. Princess Elisabeth Amalie of Hesse-Darmstadt
15. Sophia Eleonore of Saxony

== Male-line family tree ==
House of Habsburg

Original line
Albert; Count of Habsburg c. 1188–1239
Rudolf I of Germany c. 1218–1291
Albert I of Germany; 1255–1308	Hartmann; 1263–1281	Rudolf II; Duke of Austria; 1270–1290
Rudolf I of Bohemia; 1281–1307	Frederick the Fair c. 1289–1330	Leopold I Duke of Austria; 1290–1326	Albert II; Duke of Austria; 1298–1358	Henry the Friendly; 1299–1327	Otto; Duke of Austria; 1301–1339	John; Parricida c. 1290–1312/1313
Albertinian line	Leopoldian line
Rudolf IV; Duke of Austria; 1339–1365	Frederick III; 1347–1362	Albert III; Duke of Austria; 1349–1395	Leopold III; Duke of Austria; 1351–1386	Frederick II; Duke of Austria; 1327–1344	Leopold II; Duke of Austria; 1328–1344
Albert IV; Duke of Austria; 1377–1404	William; Duke of Austria c. 1370–1406	Leopold IV; Duke of Austria; 1371–1411	Ernest; Duke of Austria; 1377–1424	Frederick IV; Duke of Austria; 1382–1439
Albert II of Germany; 1397–1439	Frederick III; HRE; 1415–1493	Albert VI; Archduke of Austria; 1418–1463	Sigismund; Archduke of Austria; 1427–1496
Ladislaus the Posthumous; 1440–1457	Maximilian I HRE; 1459–1519
Philip I of Castile; 1478–1506
Spanish / Iberian line	Austrian / HRE line
Charles V HRE; 1500–1558	Ferdinand I HRE; 1503–1564
Philip II of Spain; 1527–1598	Maximilian II; HRE; 1527–1576	Ferdinand II; Archduke of Austria; 1529–1595	Charles II; Archduke of Austria; 1540–1590
Carlos; Prince of Asturias; 1545–1568	Philip III of Spain; 1578–1621	Rudolf II; HRE; 1552–1612	Ernest of Austria; 1553–1595	Matthias; HRE; 1557–1619	Maximilian III; Archduke of Austria; 1558–1618	Albert VII; Archduke of Austria; 1559–1621	Wenceslaus; Archduke of Austria; 1561–1578	Andrew; Margrave of Burgau; 1558–1600	Charles; Margrave of Burgau; 1560–1618	Ferdinand II; HRE; 1578–1637	Maximilian Ernest of Austria; 1583–1616	Leopold V Archduke of Austria; 1586–1632	Charles of Austria; 1590–1624
Philip IV of Spain; 1605–1665	Charles of Austria; 1607–1632	Ferdinand of Austria; 1609–1641	John-Charles of Austria; 1605–1619	Ferdinand III; HRE; 1608–1657	Leopold Wilhelm of Austria; 1614–1662	Ferdinand Charles; Archduke of Austria; 1628–1662	Sigismund Francis; Archduke of Austria; 1630–1665
Balthasar Charles; Prince of Asturias; 1629–1646	Charles II of Spain; 1661–1700	Ferdinand IV; King of the Romans; 1633–1654	Leopold I HRE; 1640–1705	Charles Joseph of Austria; 1649–1664
Joseph I HRE; 1678–1711	Charles VI; HRE; 1685–1740
Lorraine
Maria Theresa; HRE; 1740–1780	Francis I HRE; 1745–1765
Habsburg-Lorraine
Joseph II; HRE; 1765–1790	Leopold II; HRE; 1790–1792
Francis II; HRE; 1792–1806

== Bibliography ==
- Acton, Harold (1980). The Last Medici. London: Macmillan. ISBN 0-333-29315-0.
- Backerra, Charlotte (2019). "Disregarding Norms: Emperor Charles VI and His Intimate Relationships". Royal Studies Journal. 6 (2). University of Winchester: 74–88. doi:10.21039/rsj.206.
- Backerra, Charlotte; et al. (Homosexualität am Hof: Praktiken und Diskurse vom Mittelalter bis heute) (2020). Norman Domeier, Christian Mühling (ed.). Intime Beziehungen Kaiser Karls VI in Historiographie und überlieferten Quellen. Frankfurt am Main: Campus Verlag. ISBN 978-3-593-51076-7.
- Black, James (1999). From Louis XIV to Napoleon: The Fate of a Great Power. Routledge. ISBN 185728934X.
- Bocşan, Nicolae (2015). "Illyrian privileges and the Romanians from the Banat" (PDF). Banática. 25: 243–258. Archived from the original (PDF) on 2 January 2019.
- Browning, Reed (1995). The War of the Austrian Succession. London: Palgrave Macmillan. ISBN 0-312-12561-5.
- Crankshaw, Edward (1969). Maria Theresa. London: Longman.
- Fraser, Antonia (2002). Maria Antoinette: the Journey. London: Orion Publishing Group. ISBN 978-0-7538-1305-8.
- Fraser, Antonia (2006). Love and Louis XIV: The Women in the Life of The Sun King. London: Orion books. ISBN 978-0-7538-2293-7.
- Hochedlinger, Michael (2013). Austria's Wars of Emergence: War, State and Society in the Habsburg Monarchy, 1683–1797. London & New York: Routledge. ISBN 978-1-317-88793-5.
- Holborn, Hajo (1982). A History of Modern Germany: 1648–1840. Princeton University Press. ISBN 0-691-00796-9.
- Jones, Colin (2002). The Great Nation: France from Louis XV to Napoleon 1715-1799. Columbia University Press. ISBN 0-231-12882-7.
- Kahn, Robert A. (1992). A History of the Habsburg Empire, 1526–1918. Berkley: University of California Press. ISBN 978-0-520-04206-3.
- Mahan, J. Alexander (1932). Maria Theresa of Austria. New York: Crowell-Collier Publishing Company.
- Mitrović, Katarina (2011). "The Peace of Passarowitz and the Re-establishment of the Catholic Diocesan Administration in Belgrade and Smederevo". The Peace of Passarowitz, 1718. West Lafayette: Purdue University Press. pp. 209–217. ISBN 978-1-61249-195-0.
- Neuhold, Helmut (2008). Das andere Habsburg: Homoerotik im österreichischen Kaiserhaus. Baden-Baden: Tectum Wissenschaftsverlag. pp. passim. ISBN 978-3-828-89669-7.
- Polleroß, Friedrich; et al. (Kunst, Politik, Religion: Studien zur Kunst in Süddeutschland, Österreich, Tschechien und der Slowakei) (2000). Markus Hörsch, Elisabeth Oy-Marra (ed.). Monumenta Virtutis Austriacae: Addenda zur Kunstpolitik Kaiser Karls VI. Petersberg: Michael Imhof Verlag. ISBN 3-9325-2671-6.
- Roider, Karl A. (1972a). The Reluctant Ally: Austria's Policy in the Austro-Turkish War, 1737–1739. Baton Rouge: Louisiana State University Press. ISBN 978-0-8071-0237-4.
- Roider, Karl A. (1972b). "The Perils of Eighteenth-Century Peacemaking: Austria and the Treaty of Belgrade, 1739". Central European History. 5 (3): 195–207. doi:10.1017/S0008938900015478. JSTOR 4545635.
- Seitschek, Stefan (2018). Die Tagebücher Kaiser Karls VI. Horn: Ferdinand Berger & Söhne. ISBN 978-3-85028-856-9.
- Točanac-Radović, Isidora (2018). "Belgrade - Seat of the Archbishopric and Metropolitanate (1718–1739)". Belgrade 1521–1867. Belgrade: The Institute of History. p. 155. ISBN 978-86-7743-132-7.

Charles VI, Holy Roman Emperor House of Habsburg Born: 1 October 1685 Died: 20 October 1740
Regnal titles
Preceded by Joseph I, Holy Roman Emperor	Duke of Teschen; 1711 – 1722	Succeeded by Leopold, Duke of Lorraine
Preceded by Joseph I, Holy Roman Emperor	Holy Roman Emperor; King of the Romans; King in Germany; 1711 – 1740	Succeeded by Charles VII, Holy Roman Emperor
Preceded by Joseph I, Holy Roman Emperor	King of Hungary, Croatia and Bohemia; Archduke of Austria; 1711 – 1740	Succeeded by Maria Theresa
Preceded by Charles III of Spain	Duke of Parma; 1735 – 1740	Succeeded by Maria Theresa
Preceded by Maximilian II Emanuel, Elector of Bavaria	Duke of Luxembourg; Count of Namur; 1714 – 1740	Succeeded by Maria Theresa
Preceded by Philip V of Spain	Duke of Brabant, Limburg, Lothier, and Milan; Count of Flanders and Hainaut; 1714 – 1740	Succeeded by Maria Theresa
Preceded by Philip V of Spain	King of Sardinia; 1714 – 1720	Succeeded by Victor Amadeus II of Sardinia
Preceded by Philip V of Spain	King of Naples; 1714 – 1735	Succeeded by Charles III of Spain
Preceded by Victor Amadeus II of Sardinia	King of Sicily; 1720 – 1735	Succeeded by Charles III of Spain
