= Elisabeth Christine of Brunswick-Wolfenbüttel =

Holy Roman Empress from 1711 to 1740

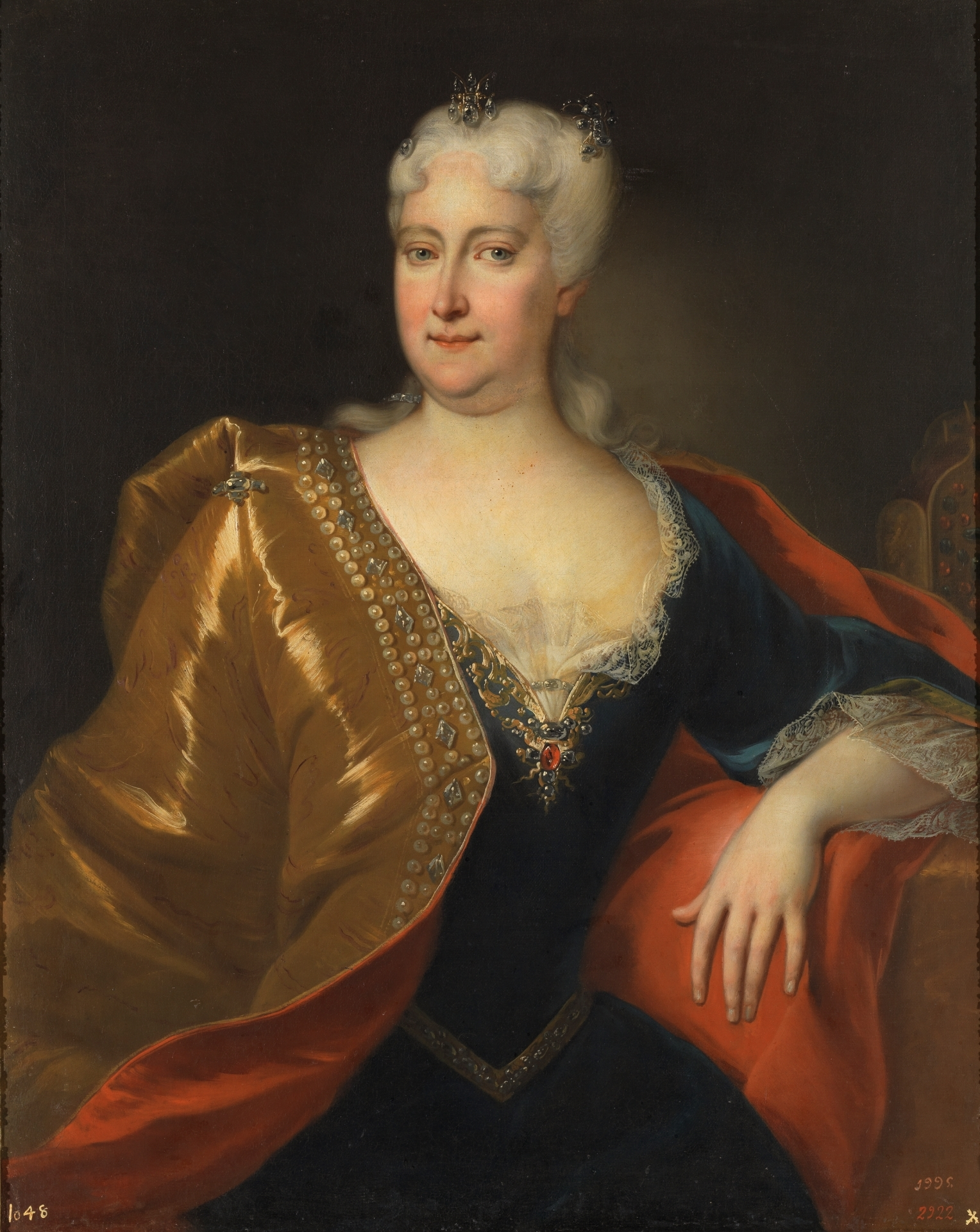
- Portrait, c. 1725-1730

Holy Roman Empress
- Tenure: 12 October 1711 – 20 October 1740
- Born: 28 August 1691; Brunswick, Duchy of Brunswick-Lüneburg
- Died: 21 December 1750 (aged 59); Vienna, Austria
- Burial: Imperial Crypt
- Spouse: Charles VI, Holy Roman Emperor (m. 1708; died 1740)
- Issue: Archduke Leopold Johann; Maria Theresa, Holy Roman Empress; Archduchess Maria Anna; Archduchess Maria Amalia
- House: Welf
- Father: Louis Rudolph, Duke of Brunswick-Wolfenbüttel
- Mother: Princess Christine Louise of Oettingen-Oettingen

Elisabeth Christine of Brunswick-Wolfenbüttel (28 August 1691 – 21 December 1750) was Princess of Brunswick-Wolfenbuttel, Holy Roman Empress, German Queen, Queen of Bohemia and Hungary; and Archduchess of Austria, etc. by her marriage to Charles VI, Holy Roman Emperor. She was renowned for her delicate beauty and also for being the mother of Empress Maria Theresa and grandmother of Joseph II and Leopold II, Holy Roman Emperor, Maria Carolina, Queen of Naples and Sicily and Marie Antoinette, Queen of France. She was the longest serving Holy Roman Empress.

== Biography ==
Elisabeth Christine was born on 28 August 1691 in Brunswick, then located in the Principality of Brunswick-Wolfenbüttel. She was the first child and eldest daughter of Louis Rudolph, Duke of Brunswick-Wolfenbüttel, and his wife, Princess Christine Louise of Oettingen-Oettingen. She had three siblings: Charlotte August (born and died 1692), Charlotte Christine (born 1694), and Antoinette Amalie (born 1696).

At age 13 Elisabeth Christine became engaged to the future Charles VI, Holy Roman Emperor, through negotiations between her ambitious grandfather, Anthony Ulrich, Duke of Brunswick-Wolfenbüttel and Charles' sister-in-law, Empress Wilhelmine Amalia, whose father was John Frederick, Duke of Brunswick-Calenberg and thus belonged to another branch of the House of Welf. However, the Lutheran Protestant bride opposed the marriage at first, since it involved her converting to Catholicism, but finally she gave in. She was tutored in Catholicism by her mother-in-law, Empress Eleonore, who introduced her to the religion and made a pilgrimage with her to Mariazell in 1706. On 1 May 1707, she was converted in Bamberg, Germany. She was required to swear the Tridentine Creed rather than a modified version she had hoped. Prior to the wedding, she was required to undergo a medical examination to prove her fertility by a doctor and the Jesuit confessor of Charles.

=== Spain ===
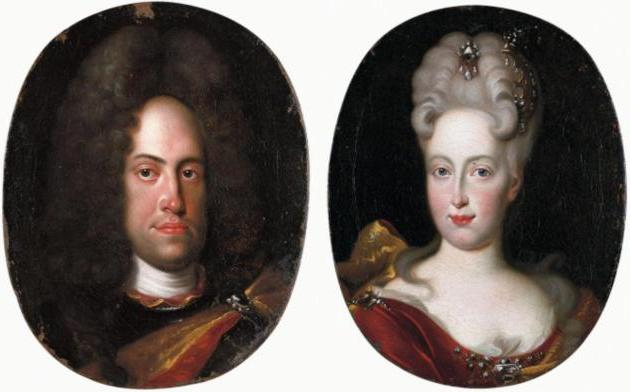
Emperor Charles and Empress Elisabeth Christine at the time of their marriage in 1708

At the time of the wedding, Charles was fighting for his claim to the Spanish throne against the French candidate Philip, so he was living in Barcelona. Elisabeth Christine arrived in Spain in July 1708 and married Charles on 1 August 1708 in the church of Santa María del Mar, Barcelona. As Philip had already fathered a son, Elisabeth Christine was immediately pressured to produce a son. During her time in Spain, she had a long-term correspondence with her mother, which was reportedly a consolation for the continuous pressure to produce a son.

In 1711, Charles left for Vienna to succeed his suddenly deceased brother Joseph I as emperor. He left Elisabeth Christine behind in Spain, appointing her as General Governor of Catalonia in his absence. She ruled Catalonia alone until 1713, when the war ended with Philip recognized by all of Austria's allies. Her official role as regent had been to sustain the morale of Charles's Catalan subjects, but Martino claimed that she actually governed more effectively than Charles had during his Spanish reign. She then joined her husband in Austria.

=== Austria ===
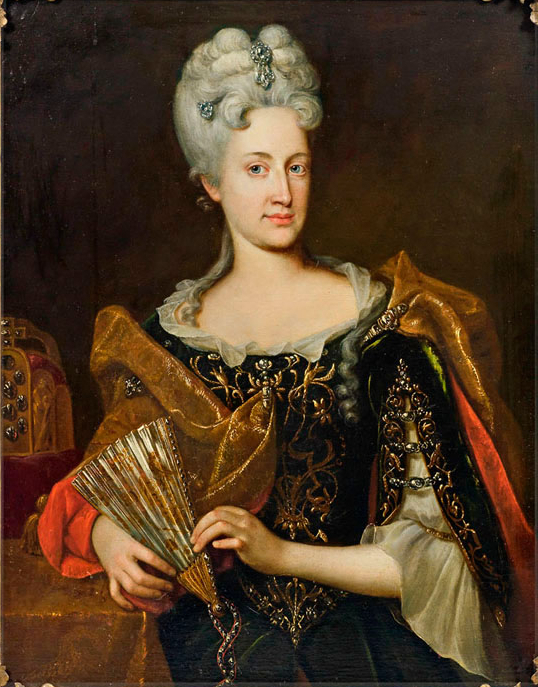
Empress Elisabeth Christine by Frans van Stampart, c. 1720

As empress, Elisabeth Christine as well as her predecessor were described as accomplished in music, discretion, modesty and diligence, and was regarded to fulfill her representational role as empress well both within the Spanish court protocol of hunting and balls and amateur theater as well as the religious devotion days of pietas austriaca. She was an excellent shot and attended shooting matches, participated in hunting while she and her ladies-in-waiting dressed in amazon attire and also played billiards. Elisabeth Christine was later rumored to be a crypto-Protestant, likely because she was a patron of Jansenists such as Johann Christoph von Bartenstein.

Charles VI did not allow her any political influence whatsoever after her arrival in Austria in 1713. However, she was described as intelligent and self-sufficient, and she established political connections among the ministers, especially Guido Starhemberg; and she took some initiative to engage in politics on her own. In the 1720s, she appeared to have had some influence in the treaty with the Russian tsar through her family connections in Northern Germany, and she allied herself with the court faction which opposed the plans to marry her daughters to members of the Spanish royal house.

The marriage of Elisabeth Christine was dominated by the pressure upon her to give birth to a male heir. This she later fulfilled when she gave birth to a male heir named Archduke Leopold John in 1716. However, at age 7 months the infant Leopold died. She reportedly found the situation very stressing and was tormented by the loss of confidence in Charles VI that this caused. Three years after her marriage, court doctors prescribed large doses of liquor to make her more fertile, which gave her face a permanent blush. During her 1725 pregnancy, Charles unsuccessfully had her bedchamber decorated with erotic images of male beauty so as to make her expected baby male by stimulating her fantasy. After this, the court doctors prescribed a rich diet to increase her fertility, which made her so fat that she became unable to walk, experienced breathing problems, insomnia and dropsy and had to be lowered into her chairs by a specially constructed machine.

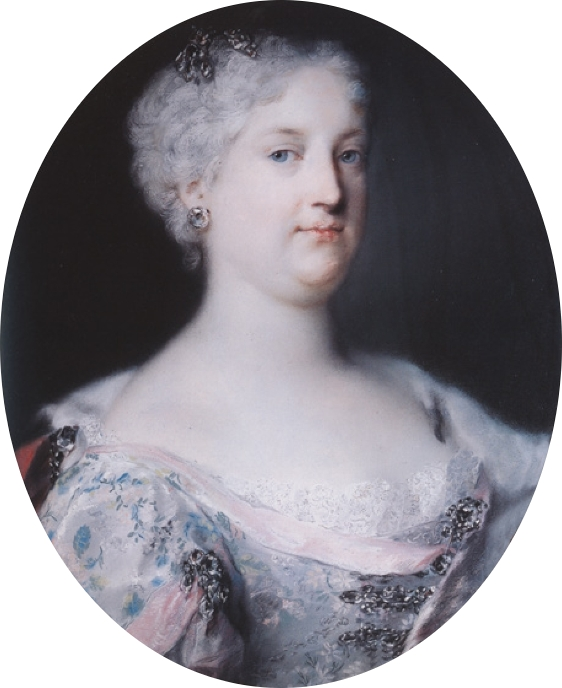
Portrait of Empress Elisabeth Christine by Rosalba Carriera, 1730)

Though her health was devastated by the different prescriptions as how to make her conceive another son, Charles VI apparently did care for her: he continued to refer to her by her pet name White Liz, expressed sincere concern in his diary about her health and left her an independent income in his will. Charles had a mistress before the marriage, as well as several male lovers, notable among them Count Althann.

Elisabeth Christine got along very well with her mother-in-law, Eleonore, and her sister-in-law Wilhelmine Amalia, and the three empresses were described as supportive toward each other: Wilhelmine Amalia nursed Elisabeth Christine when she had smallpox, and Elisabeth Christine nursed Eleonore during her last illness.

Despite her lack of political influence, she was successful in arranging the marriage of her niece Elisabeth Christine, a daughter of her sister Antoinette, with the Prussian crown prince and later King Frederick the Great, in 1732 and the marriage of her nephew Anthony Ulrich of Brunswick with Anna Leopoldovna, the heiress of the Russian Empress Anna in 1739. However, the Austro-Prussian rapprochement she had hoped for only lasted until the death of Frederick William I of Prussia in May 1740 and her husband, the Emperor, in October of the same year. On 16 December, her nephew by marriage, Frederick II, invaded Habsburg Silesia, triggering the First Silesian War.

=== Empress Dowager ===
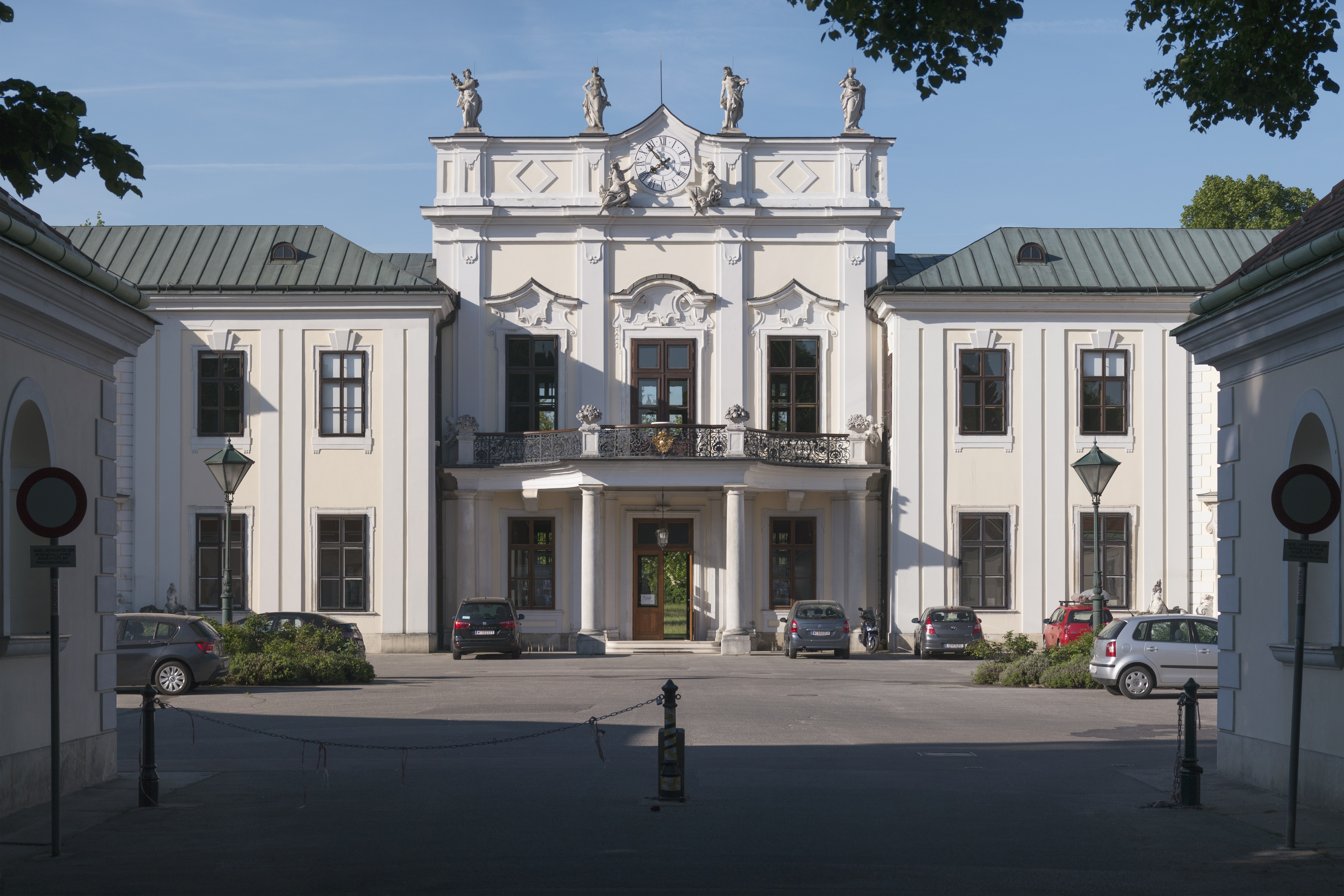
Schloss Hetzendorf

In 1740, Charles VI died, leaving her a widow. As a widow, she never received the large income left to her in the will of Charles because of the crisis of the state, but her daughter Maria Theresa provided a comfortable existence for her court. As a widow's seat, she gave her Schloss Hetzendorf near Vienna.

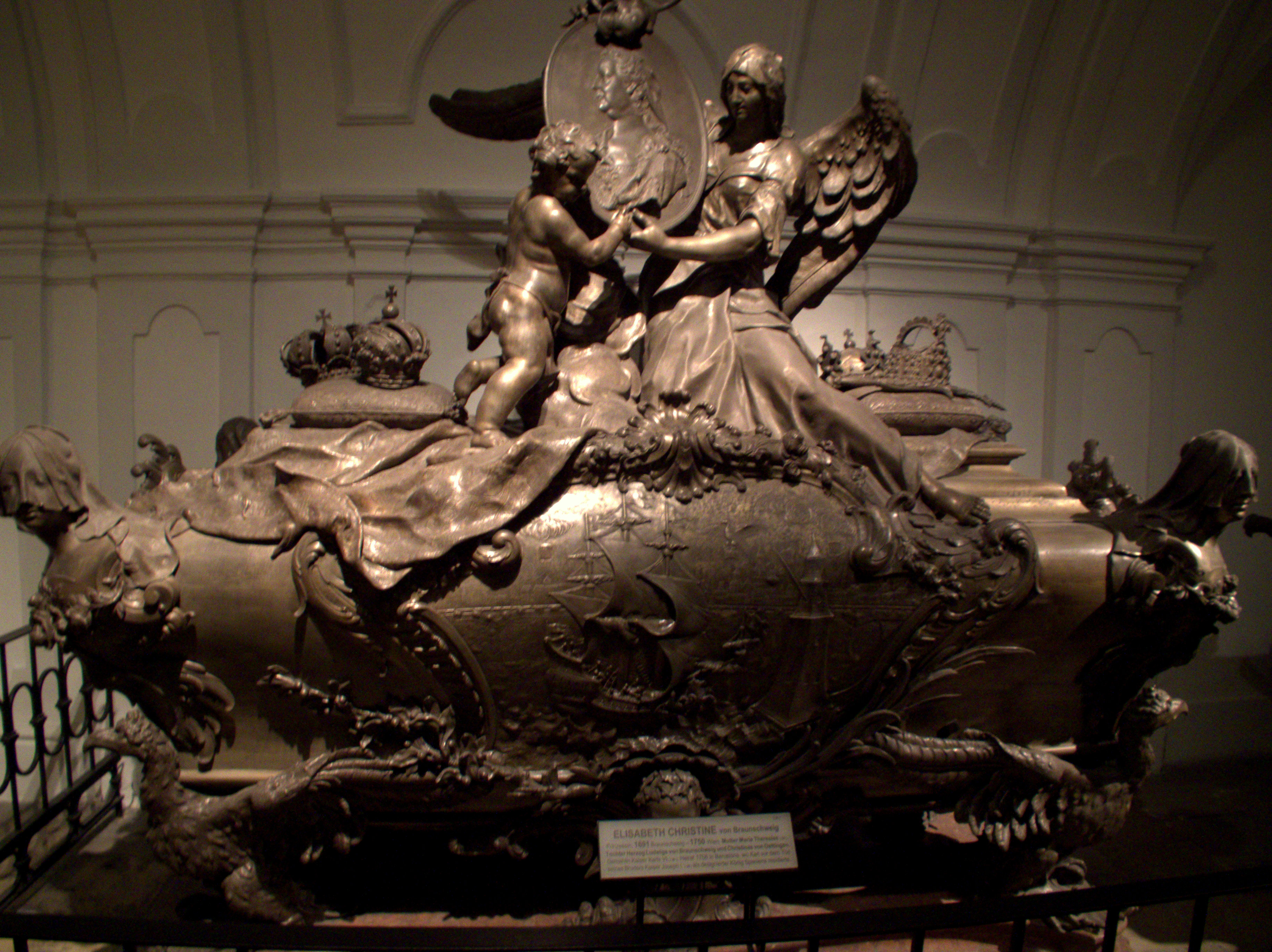
The tomb of Empress Elisabeth Christine, Capuchin Crypt, Vienna, designed by Johann Lukas von Hildebrandt

Though the traditional view has been that she had a good relationship with her daughter the empress, there is actually nothing to confirm such a thing. While Maria Theresa is known to have freely expressed her affection for people she cared for, she never did so with her mother; she visited her regularly, but the visits were formal, and during her interaction she behaved strictly according to Spanish court etiquette. In 1747, the Prussian ambassador claimed that she was politically active, "without arousing the suspicion that she is trying to meddle" in political matters. Elisabeth Christine died in Vienna.

== Children ==
- Leopold Johann (13 April 1716 – 4 November 1716), died in infancy.
- Maria Theresa (13 May 1717 – 29 November 1780), Holy Roman Empress, ruler of the Habsburg domains
- Maria Anna (26 September 1718 – 16 December 1744), governor of the Austrian Netherlands for a few months before her death in childbirth
- Maria Amalia (5 April 1724 – 19 April 1730), died in childhood.

== Ancestry ==
Ancestors of Elisabeth Christine of Brunswick-Wolfenbüttel

8. Augustus II, Duke of Brunswick-Wolfenbüttel
4. Anthony Ulrich, Duke of Brunswick-Wolfenbüttel
9. Princess Dorothea of Anhalt-Zerbst
2. Louis Rudolph, Duke of Brunswick-Wolfenbüttel
10. Frederick, Duke of Schleswig-Holstein-Sonderburg-Norburg
5. Princess Elisabeth Juliana of Schleswig-Holstein-Sonderburg-Norburg
11. Princess Eleanor of Anhalt-Zerbst
1. Elisabeth Christine of Brunswick-Wolfenbüttel
12. Joachim Ernest, Count of Oettingen-Oettingen
6. Albert Ernest I, Prince of Oettingen-Oettingen
13. Countess Anna Dorothea of Hohenlohe-Neuenstein
3. Princess Christine Louise of Oettingen-Oettingen
14. Eberhard III, Duke of Württemberg
7. Duchess Christine Friederike of Württemberg
15. Anna Katharina of Salm-Kyrburg

Coat of arms as consort of the Pretender to the Spanish Throne.

== See also ==
- Order of Elizabeth and Theresa

Elisabeth Christine of Brunswick-Wolfenbüttel House of Welf Born: 28 August 1691 Died: 21 December 1750
Royal titles
Preceded by Anne Marie d'Orléans	Queen consort of Sicily; 1720–1734	Vacant Title next held by Maria Amalia of Saxony
Preceded by Maria Luisa of Savoy	Queen consort of Naples; 1713–1735	Vacant Title next held by Maria Amalia of Saxony
Preceded by Maria Luisa of Savoy	Queen consort of Sardinia; 1713–1720	Succeeded by Anne Marie d'Orléans
Preceded by Wilhelmina Amalia of Brunswick	Holy Roman Empress and German Queen; 1711–1740	Vacant Title next held by Maria Amalia of Austria
Preceded by Wilhelmina Amalia of Brunswick	Queen consort of Bohemia; 1711–1740	Vacant Title next held by Maria Amalia of Austria
Preceded by Wilhelmina Amalia of Brunswick	Queen consort of Hungary and Croatia; 1711–1740	Vacant Title next held by Maria Luisa of Spain
Vacant Title last held by Enrichetta d'Este	Duchess consort of Parma; 1735–1740	Vacant Title next held by Louise Élisabeth of France
