= Królewicz =

Polish title

Królewicz (Polish: [kruˈlɛ.vit͡ʂ], f. królewna [kruˈlɛv.na]; plural forms królewicze and królewny) was the title given to the sons and daughters of the king of Poland (and Grand Duke of Lithuania at the same time), later the Polish–Lithuanian Commonwealth. It was similar in its distinctiveness to the Spanish and Portuguese title of infante, also reserved to the children of the monarch. Though, it was used only to denote one's status as a King's child. Królewicz and królewna has no direct equivalent in other languages and was translated to the English prince and German Prinz, like dynasts of a royal house. Królewicze since the 16th century could not also be regarded as and equivalent to the princes of the blood, because the Polish monarchy was not hereditary since 1573, when after the death of the last Jagiellon king, future Henry III of France was elected. In official Latin titulature children of Polish kings were often styled as Poloniae princeps or princeps Poloniae, meaning Prince/ss of Poland or Polish prince/ss. In more official way, the full style of sons of monarchs was Dei Gratia regius princeps Poloniae et Lithuaniae for the sons.

== Polish królewicze and królewny ==
Polish monarchs with legitimate children and their offspring (since the House of Jagiellon):

- Władysław II Jagiełło
  - Elżbieta Bonifacja (1399)
  - Jadwiga (1408–1431)
  - Władysław (1424–1444) (later King)
  - Kazimierz (1426–1427)
  - Kazimierz (1427–1492) (later King)
- Kazimierz IV Jagiellończyk:
  - Władysław (1456–1516) (later King of Bohemia and Hungary)
  - Jadwiga (1457–1502)
  - Saint Kazimierz (1458–1484)
  - Jan Olbracht (1459–1501) (later King)
  - Aleksander (1461–1506) (later King)
  - Zofia (1464–1512)
  - Elżbieta (1465–1466)
  - Zygmunt (1467–1548) (later King)
  - Fryderyk (1468–1503)
  - Elżbieta (1472–1480/1481)
  - Anna (1476–1503)
  - Barbara (1478–1534)
  - Elżbieta (1482–1517)
- Zygmunt I Stary:
  - Jadwiga (1513–1573)
  - Anna (1515–1520)
  - Izabella (1519–1559)
  - Zygmunt (1520–1572) (later King)
  - Zofia (1522–1575)
  - Anna (1523–1596) (later King)
  - Katarzyna (1526–1583)
  - Olbracht (1527)
- Zygmunt III Waza (also King of Sweden):
  - Anna Maria (1593–1600)
  - Katarzyna (1594)
  - Władysław (1595–1648) (later King)
  - Katarzyna (1596–1597)
  - Krzysztof (1598)
  - Jan Kazimierz (1607–1608)
  - Jan Kazimierz (1609–1672) (later King)
  - Jan Albert (1612–1634)
  - Karol Ferdynand (1613–1655) (later Duke of Opole)
  - Aleksander Karol (1614–1634)
  - Anna Konstancja (1616)
  - Anna Katarzyna Konstancja (1619–1651)
- Władysław IV Waza:
  - Zygmunt Kazimierz (1640–1647)
  - Maria Anna Izabela (1642)
- Jan II Kazimierz Waza:
  - Maria Anna Teresa (1650–1651)
  - Jan Zygmunt (1652)
- Michał Korybut Wiśniowiecki:
  - NN (son) (1670)
- Jan III Sobieski:
  - Jakub Ludwik (1667–1737)
  - Adelajda Ludwika (1672–1677)
  - Maria Teresa (1673–1675)
  - NN (daughter) (1674)
  - Teresa Kunegunda (1676–1730)
  - NN (daughter) (1678)
  - Aleksander Benedykt (1677–1714)
  - Konstanty Władysław (1680–1726)
  - Jan (1683–1685)
- August II Mocny (also Elector of Saxony):
  - Fryderyk August (1696–1763) (later elected King)
- Stanisław Leszczyński (also Duke of Lorraine and Bar):
  - Maria (1703–1768)
  - Anna (1699–1717)
- August III Sas (also Elector of Saxony):
  - Fryderyk August(1720–1721)
  - Józef August (1721–1728)
  - Fryderyk Krystian (1722–1763) (later Elector of Saxony and progenitor of the Kings of Saxony)
  - Maria Amalia (1724–1760)
  - Maria Małgorzata (1727–1734)
  - Maria Anna (1728–1797)
  - Franciszek Ksawery (1730–1806)
  - Maria Józefa (1731–1767)
  - Karol Krystian (1733–1796) (later Duke of Courland and Semigallia)
  - Maria Krystyna (1735–1782) (later Abbess of Remiremont)
  - Maria Elżbieta (1736–1818)
  - Albert Kazimierz (1738–1822) (later Duke of Teschen)
  - Klemens Wacław (1739–1812) (later Archbishop-Elector of Trier)
  - Maria Kunegunda (1740–1826) (later Abbess of Thorn and Abbess of Essen)

== See also ==
- Crown prince
- Prince du sang
- Princess Maria Augusta of Saxony - styled as Polish infanta
