= Crown of Augustus III of Poland =

Crown used by Augustus III of Poland

Crown of Augustus
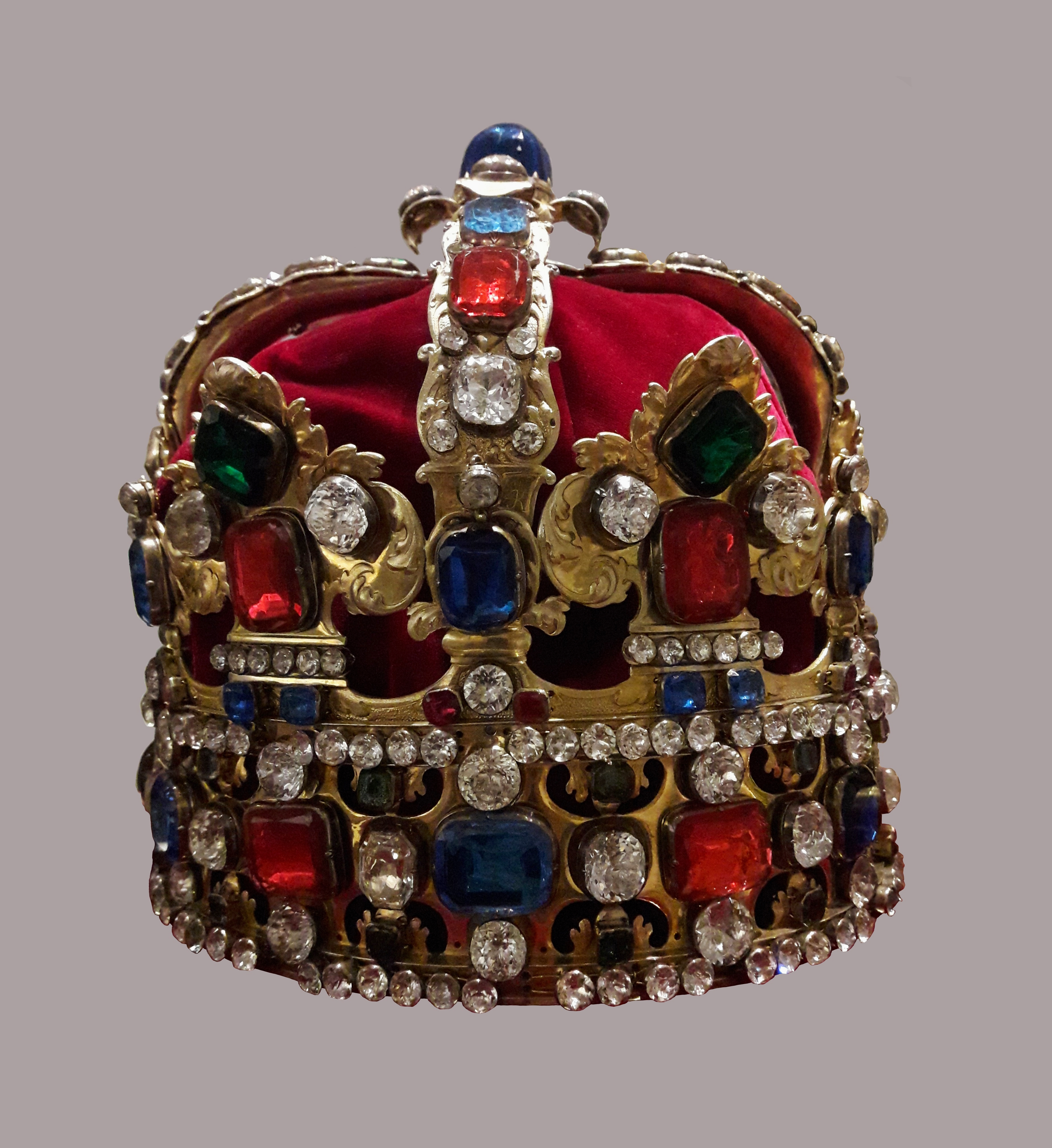
- Crown of Augustus III of Poland

Details
- Country: Poland
- Made: 1733
- Arches: 4
- Cap: Red velvet

The crown of Augustus III was made in 1733 for Augustus III's coronation in Kraków in 1734.

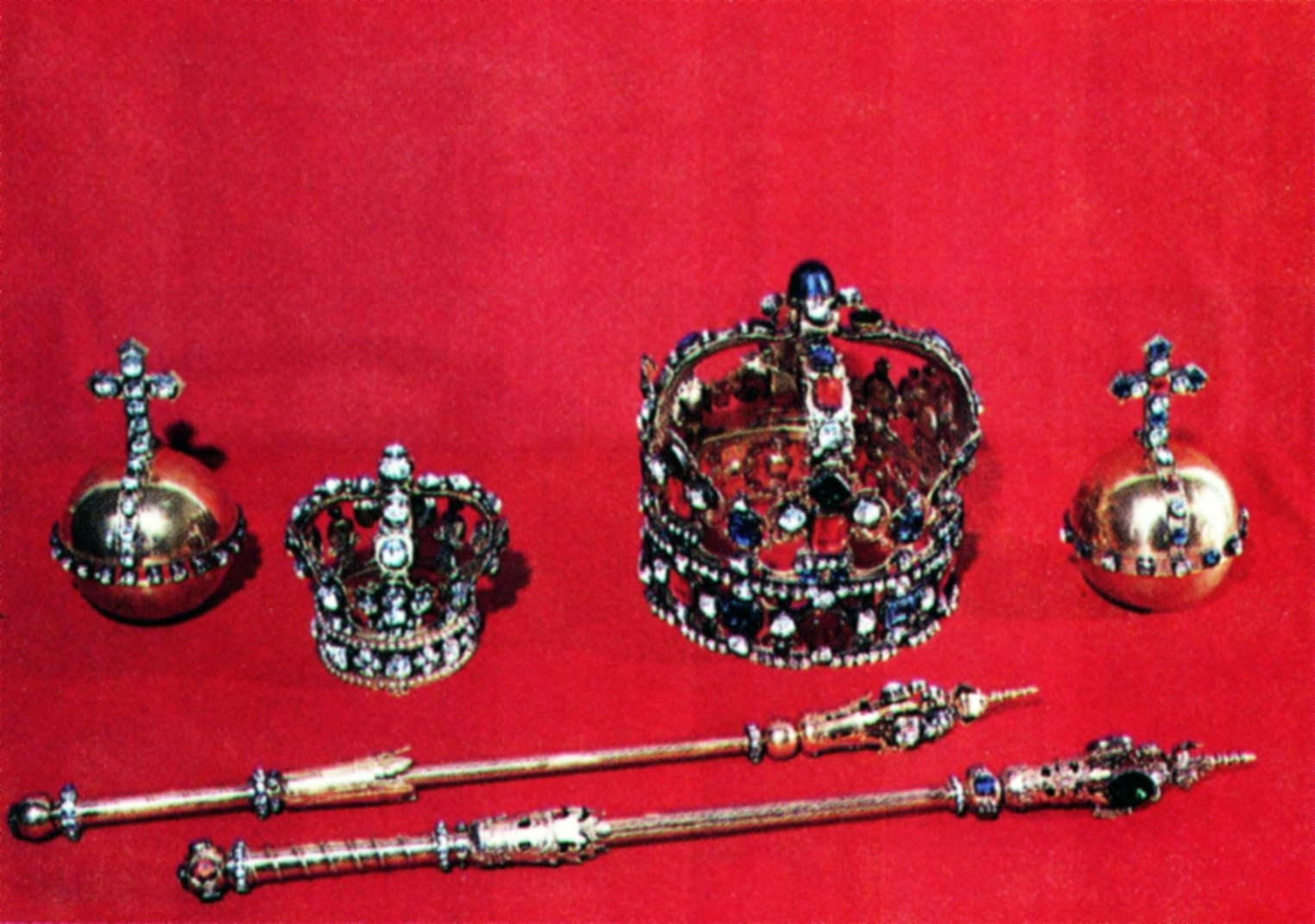
Silver regalia of King Augustus III of Poland and Queen Maria Josepha

== History ==
In 1925 Polish government purchased the silver regalia of King Augustus III and Queen Maria Josepha in Vienna for $35,000 (175 000 zł). It consisted of 2 crowns, 2 sceptres and 2 orbs made in about 1733. The original crown regalia were hidden during the war of the Polish Succession. The jewels were exhibited in Warsaw till 1939 and in 1940 they were stolen by German forces. Later they were found by the Soviet troops in Germany and sent to the USSR where they remained until 1960, when they were returned to Poland. Today they are deposited in the National Museum in Warsaw.
