= Maria Elisabeth of Saxony (1736–1818) =

German Princess of Saxony

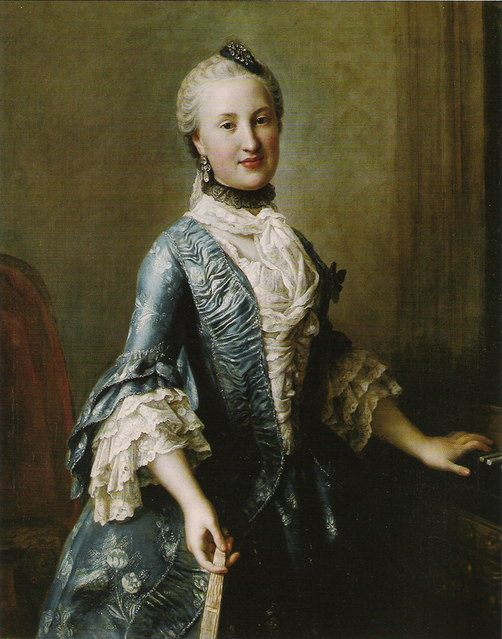
- Maria Elisabeth by Pietro Rotari, c. 1755.
- Born: 9 February 1736; Wilanów Palace, Warsaw, Poland
- Died: 24 December 1818 (aged 82); Dresden, Saxony
Names
- Maria Elisabeth Apollonia Casimira Francisca Xaveria
- House: House of Wettin
- Father: Augustus III of Poland
- Mother: Maria Josepha of Austria

Maria Elisabeth of Saxony (Maria Elisabeth Apollonia Casimira Francisca Xaveria; 2 February 1736 – 24 December 1818) was a German noblewoman and titular Princess of Poland, Lithuania and Saxony of the Albertine branch of the House of Wettin.

== Biography ==
Maria Elisabeth was born at the Wilanów Palace in Poland as the eleventh child of fourteen. Her father, Augustus III of Poland, was the Elector of Saxony (as Frederick Augustus II), King of Poland and Grand Duke of Lithuania (as Augustus II). Her mother Maria Josepha, born an Archduchess of Austria, was a first cousin of Empress Maria Theresa. She came from a close family and her parents made sure they put emphasis on a good education. The young princess was educated in Latin, French, Polish, philosophy, geography, religion, drawing, music and dance.

Her sisters included Maria Amalia, Queen of Spain (wife of Charles III of Spain), Maria Josepha, Dauphine of France (mother of Louis XVI), Maria Anna, Electress of Bavaria, Maria Christina, Abbess of Remiremont and Maria Kunigunde, Abbess of Thorn and Essen. Her brothers included two electors of Saxony: Frederick Christian, Charles of Saxony, Duke of Courland, and also Prince Albert of Saxony, Duke of Teschen (son-in-law of Empress Maria Theresa).

She died on 24 December 1818, unmarried and she had no issue.

== Ancestry ==
Ancestors of Maria Elisabeth of Saxony (1736–1818)

16. John George II, Elector of Saxony
8. John George III, Elector of Saxony
17. Magdalene Sybille of Brandenburg-Bayreuth
4. Augustus II the Strong
18. Frederick III of Denmark
9. Princess Anna Sophie of Denmark
19. Sophie Amalie of Brunswick-Lüneburg
2. Augustus III of Poland
20. Erdmann August of Brandenburg-Bayreuth
10. Christian Ernst, Margrave of Brandenburg-Bayreuth
21. Sophie of Brandenburg-Ansbach
5. Christiane Eberhardine of Brandenburg-Bayreuth
22. Eberhard III, Duke of Württemberg
11. Sophie Luise of Württemberg
23. Anna Catharina of Salm-Kyrburg
1. Maria Elisabeth of Saxony
24. Ferdinand III, Holy Roman Emperor
12. Leopold I, Holy Roman Emperor
25. Maria Anna of Spain
6. Joseph I, Holy Roman Emperor
26. Philipp Wilhelm, Elector Palatine
13. Eleonor Magdalene of the Palatinate
27. Landgravine Elisabeth Amalie of Hesse-Darmstadt
3. Maria Josepha of Austria
28. George, Duke of Brunswick-Lüneburg
14. John Frederick, Duke of Brunswick-Lüneburg
29. Anne Eleonore of Hesse-Darmstadt
7. Wilhelmina Amalia of Brunswick
30. Edward, Count Palatine of Simmern
15. Benedicta-Henrietta of Simmern
31. Anna Gonzaga
