= Polish Prince =

Polish Prince may refer to:

- The Prince of Poland
- Królewicz, Królewna titles given to the sons and daughters of the king of Poland
- Andrzej Fonfara (born 1987), Polish light heavyweight boxer
- Alan Kulwicki (1954–1993), American auto racing driver and team owner
- Edward Wiskoski (1945–2025), American professional wrestler
- Bobby Vinton (born 1935), American singer, songwriter, and actor
