= Princess Maria Christina of Saxony (1735–1782) =

- Abbess of Remiremont
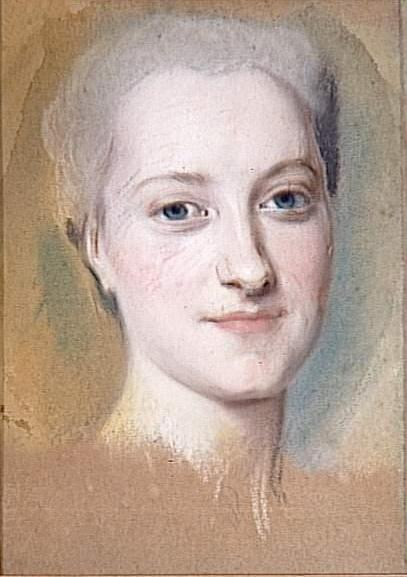
- Maria Christina by Maurice Quentin de La Tour
- Born: 15 February 1735; Wilanów Palace, Warsaw, Poland
- Died: 19 November 1782 (aged 47); Château de Brumath, Brumath, France
- Burial: 15 December 1782; Église des Dames, Remiremont, France
Names
- Maria Christina Anna Theresa Salomea Eulalia Francisca Xaveria
- House: Wettin
- Father: Augustus III of Poland
- Mother: Maria Josepha of Austria
- Religion: Roman Catholicism

Princess Maria Christina of Saxony (Maria Christina Anna Theresa Salomea Eulalia Francisca Xaveria; 12 February 1735 – 19 November 1782) was a Princess of Saxony and later Abbess of Remiremont.

== Life ==
She was the daughter of Augustus III of Poland, Elector of Saxony (as Frederick Augustus II), King of Poland and Grand Duke of Lithuania (as Augustus II), and Maria Josepha of Austria, first cousin of Empress Maria Theresa.

Maria Christina was born at the Wilanów Palace in Poland. She came from a close family and her parents made sure they put emphasis on a good education. She was educated in Latin, French, Polish, philosophy, geography, religion, drawing, music and dance.

Her older sister Maria Josepha married Louis, Dauphin of France in 1747.

=== Abbess ===
In 1764, Maria Christina was sent to France to become a Coadjutorice at the Abbey of Remiremont in Remiremont, northern France. Her position was thanks to the personal intervention of Louis XV himself.

At the time of her arrival, the abbey was under the control of Princess Anne Charlotte of Lorraine, sister of the Holy Roman Emperor and aunt of the future Marie Antoinette.

In France, she was known as Marie Christine de Saxe. In 1773, at the death of Anne Charlotte, Maria Christina was named Abbess, a position she would keep until her death.

Remiremont had seats and votes in the Reichstag including all rights and obligations of an Imperial Princess (such as low justice, tax, legislation, coinage and military service), and enjoyed immunity against temporal power.

She was a frequent visitor to Paris and was fond of the Theatre and the city's social life. She spent a great deal of money, the payment of which was made by Stanisław Leszczyński, Duke of Lorraine, until his death in 1766, and after that, the king Louis XV. Her correspondence with her brother Francis Xavier, Regent of Saxony was preserved at Trojes.

She was created a Dame of the Order of the Starry Cross.

Maria Christina bought the Château de Brumath in the town of Brumath in the Alsace region of France. Purchased in 1775, she chose the building for its location in the country and for its natural setting. She lived a lavish lifestyle at the château, which far outdid her revenues.

Dying at the château on 19 November 1782, her nephew King Louis XVI was obliged to pay her debts in the amount of 136,876 livres for his dead aunt.

She was buried at the abbey in its Église des Dames on 15 December 1782. She was praised for her intelligence, her conversation and for being a cultivated woman for her age. The château de Brumath, later abandoned, was pillaged in the French Revolution.

== Ancestry ==
Ancestors of Princess Maria Christina of Saxony (1735–1782)

16. John George II, Elector of Saxony
8. John George III, Elector of Saxony
17. Magdalene Sybille of Brandenburg-Bayreuth
4. Augustus II of Poland
18. Frederick III of Denmark
9. Princess Anna Sophie of Denmark
19. Sophie Amalie of Brunswick-Lüneburg
2. Augustus III of Poland
20. Erdmann August of Brandenburg-Bayreuth
10. Christian Ernst, Margrave of Brandenburg-Bayreuth
21. Sophie of Brandenburg-Ansbach
5. Christiane Eberhardine of Brandenburg-Bayreuth
22. Eberhard III, Duke of Württemberg
11. Sophie Luise of Württemberg
23. Anna Catharina of Salm-Kyrburg
1. Maria Christina of Saxony
24. Ferdinand III, Holy Roman Emperor
12. Leopold I, Holy Roman Emperor
25. Maria Anna of Spain
6. Joseph I, Holy Roman Emperor
26. Philipp Wilhelm, Elector Palatine
13. Eleonor Magdalene of the Palatinate
27. Landgravine Elisabeth Amalie of Hesse-Darmstadt
3. Maria Josepha of Austria
28. George, Duke of Brunswick-Lüneburg
14. John Frederick, Duke of Brunswick-Lüneburg
29. Anne Eleonore of Hesse-Darmstadt
7. Wilhelmina Amalia of Brunswick
30. Edward, Count Palatine of Simmern
15. Benedicta-Henrietta of Simmern
31. Anna Gonzaga
