= Maria Josepha of Austria =

Queen of Poland from 1733 to 1757

Maria Josepha
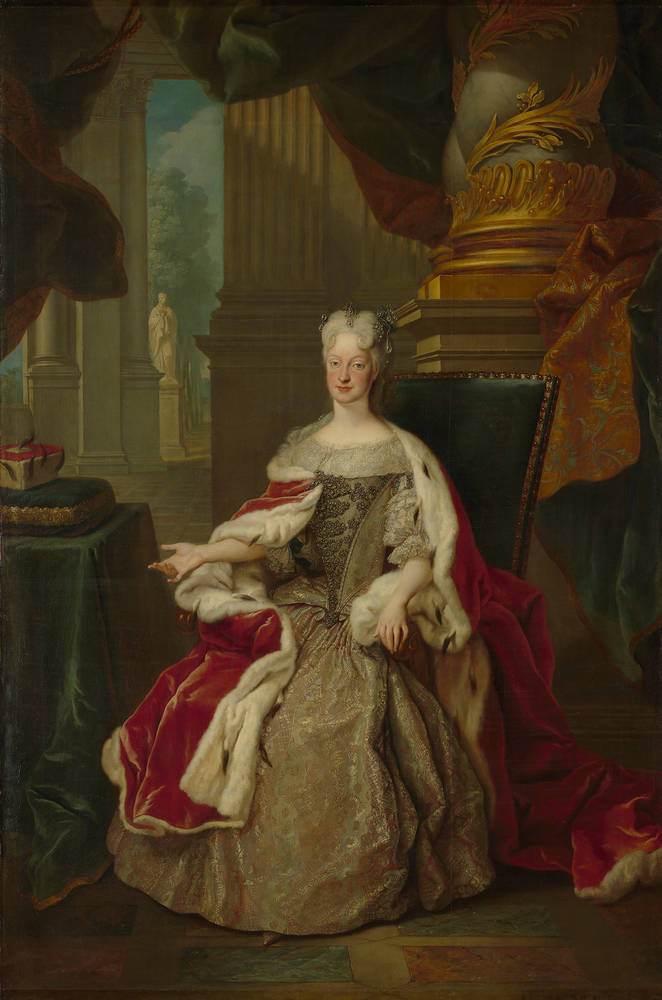
- Portrait by Louis de Silvestre, 1719

Queen consort of Poland; Grand Duchess consort of Lithuania
- Tenure: 5 October 1733 –17 November 1757
- Coronation: 17 January 1734; Wawel Cathedral, Kraków

Electress consort of Saxony
- Tenure: 1 February 1733 –17 November 1757
- Born: 8 December 1699; Hofburg Palace, Vienna, Archduchy of Austria, Holy Roman Empire
- Died: 17 November 1757 (aged 57); Dresden, Electorate of Saxony, Holy Roman Empire
- Burial: Catholic Court Church, Dresden
- Spouse: Augustus III of Poland (m. 1719)
- Issue...among others: Frederick Christian, Elector of Saxony; Maria Amalia, Queen of Spain; Maria Anna, Electress of Bavaria; Franz Xavier, Prince Regent; Maria Josepha, Dauphine of France; Karl, Duke of Courland; Maria Christina, Abbess of Remiremont; Princess Maria Elisabeth; Albert Casimir, Duke of Teschen; Clemens Wenceslaus, Archbishop of Trier; Maria Kunigunde, Abbess of Essen
- House: Habsburg
- Father: Joseph I, Holy Roman Emperor
- Mother: Wilhelmine Amalie of Brunswick

Maria Josepha of Austria (Maria Josepha Benedikta Antonia Theresia Xaveria Philippine, Polish: Maria Józefa, Lithuanian: Marija Juozapa; 8 December 1699 – 17 November 1757) was the Queen of Poland, Grand Duchess of Lithuania and Electress of Saxony by marriage to Augustus III. From 1711 to 1717, she was heiress presumptive to the Habsburg monarchy.

== Early life ==
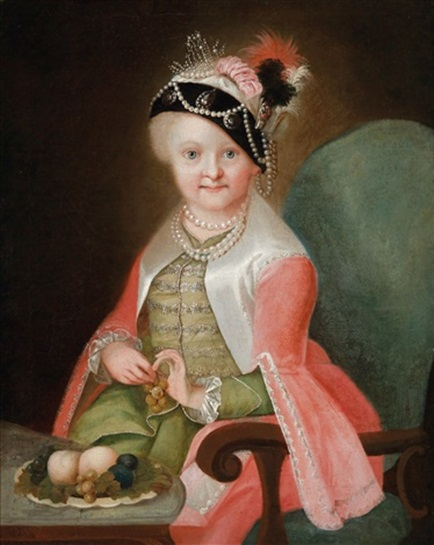
Archduchess Maria Josepha (painting c. 1710)

Maria Josepha was born in Vienna, an Archduchess of Austria, the eldest child and eldest daughter of Joseph I, Holy Roman Emperor and his wife, Princess Wilhelmina Amalia of Brunswick-Lüneburg. She was named Josepha in honor of her father.

=== Heiress presumptive ===
During the times of her childhood, the House of Habsburg had no male heirs, as her only brother, Archduke Leopold Joseph of Austria (1700-1701) died in infancy. During the reign of her grandfather, Maria Josepha's father and uncle signed the Mutual Pact of Succession of 1703, which was issued by her grandfather, Emperor Leopold I, and effectively made Maria Josepha the heiress presumptive to her uncle, Emperor Charles VI. However, Charles VI's Pragmatic Sanction of 1713 annulled the earlier agreement and made his eldest daughter Maria Theresa his successor instead of eldest his niece, Maria Josepha.

=== Marriage ===
A marriage between Maria Josepha and Frederick Augustus II, Elector of Saxony (1696–1763) had been suggested by Frederick's father, Augustus II the Strong, since 1704. The fact that Maria Josepha was not allowed to marry a non-Catholic, however, prevented the marriage. When Augustus converted to Catholicism in 1712, the negotiations became serious.

Emperor Charles VI forbade Maria Josepha and her sister from marrying until they renounced their positions in the line of succession, securing the succession for Charles's future daughter Maria Theresa. Maria Josepha renounced her claim on 10 August 1719. Ten days later, Maria Josepha and Frederick Augustus married. Through this marriage between the Houses of Wettin and Habsburg, Frederick Augustus II's father hoped to place Saxony in a better position should there arise a war of succession to the Austrian territories. The couple's eldest surviving son, Frederick Christian, eventually succeeded his father as Elector of Saxony. In Saxony, the couple lived at Dresden Castle. The marriage has been described as a happy one, and Augustus was apparently never unfaithful.

== Queen and electress ==
In 1733, Frederick Augustus was elected King and Grand Duke of the Polish–Lithuanian Commonwealth as August III the Saxon. Maria Josepha was crowned on 17 January 1734. Queen Maria Josepha was described as ambitious, intelligent and religious. She founded many churches and convents and gave her strong support to the Polish-Lithuanian Jesuits.

As queen of Poland, grand duchess of Lithuania and electress of Saxony, she divided her time between the two nations. Though Saxony was her main residence, she enjoyed her stays in Poland-Lithuania because it was a Catholic nation where she could exercise her faith openly. Between November 1734 to February 1736, she and Frederick Augustus made their longest visit to Poland-Lithuania, prolonged because of the War of the Polish Succession. They continued to make frequent trips, lasting between five and eight months each, plus several shorter trips lasting a couple of months less. She learned to speak Polish and was often present during the assemblies of the Sejm of the Polish-Lithuanian Commonwealth. During her absences from home, she frequently corresponded with her children in French, having a somewhat closer relationship to them than usual for her class. She gave them pet names and encouraged them to write to her in an informal way. She shared an interest in music, art and hunting with her spouse, and they usually spent their autumns at the Palace of Hubertusburg for the hunting season.

She was devoted to Catholicism and especially venerated Saint Francis Xavier and was actively involved in the building of the Catholic Hofkirche in Dresden. Her personal confessor, the Jesuit Fr. Anton Hermann, criticized her for being too religious from what was proper for someone not a Catholic religious order member. She attended mass twice and eventually four times a day and kept more devotions than was normal for a nun or a monk. Fr. Anton Hermann eventually lectured her that she was more fervent than could be regarded as modest for a lay person. Maria Josepha did not persecute non-Catholics, and once stressed to the heir to the throne that he should not persecute them but allow them all freedom while being guided by the Catholic faith. She also gave alms to both Catholic and Protestant poor. Despite her personal strict moral code, she was reportedly not a prude and got along well with her spouse's illegitimate half-siblings.

Queen Maria Josepha was politically active and, though not formally proclaimed regent during the absence of her spouse, she informally acted as his representative. It was known and acknowledged by the court that she participated in the affairs of state, and the ministers and ambassadors duly reported to her. She also managed a large diplomatic correspondence. She was rivalled in her influence over her spouse by Heinrich von Brühl. Maria Josepha was reportedly not on good terms with her eldest son Frederick Christian. She wished for her younger son Francis Xavier to be elected king of Poland and grand duke of Lithuania rather than having Frederick Christian succeed his father on both thrones, and she prevented Frederick Christian and his spouse from visiting Poland-Lithuania, thus preventing them from making connections there. She undermined any attempts of Frederick Christian to found a power base of his own before the death of his father, and among other things prevented a meeting between him and his spouse with Empress Maria Theresa of Austria in 1754.

During the War of the Austrian Succession in 1740, she claimed the throne on behalf of her spouse. She relinquished her claim in favor of her sister, Maria Amalia's spouse, and in 1742, made an alliance with Austria.

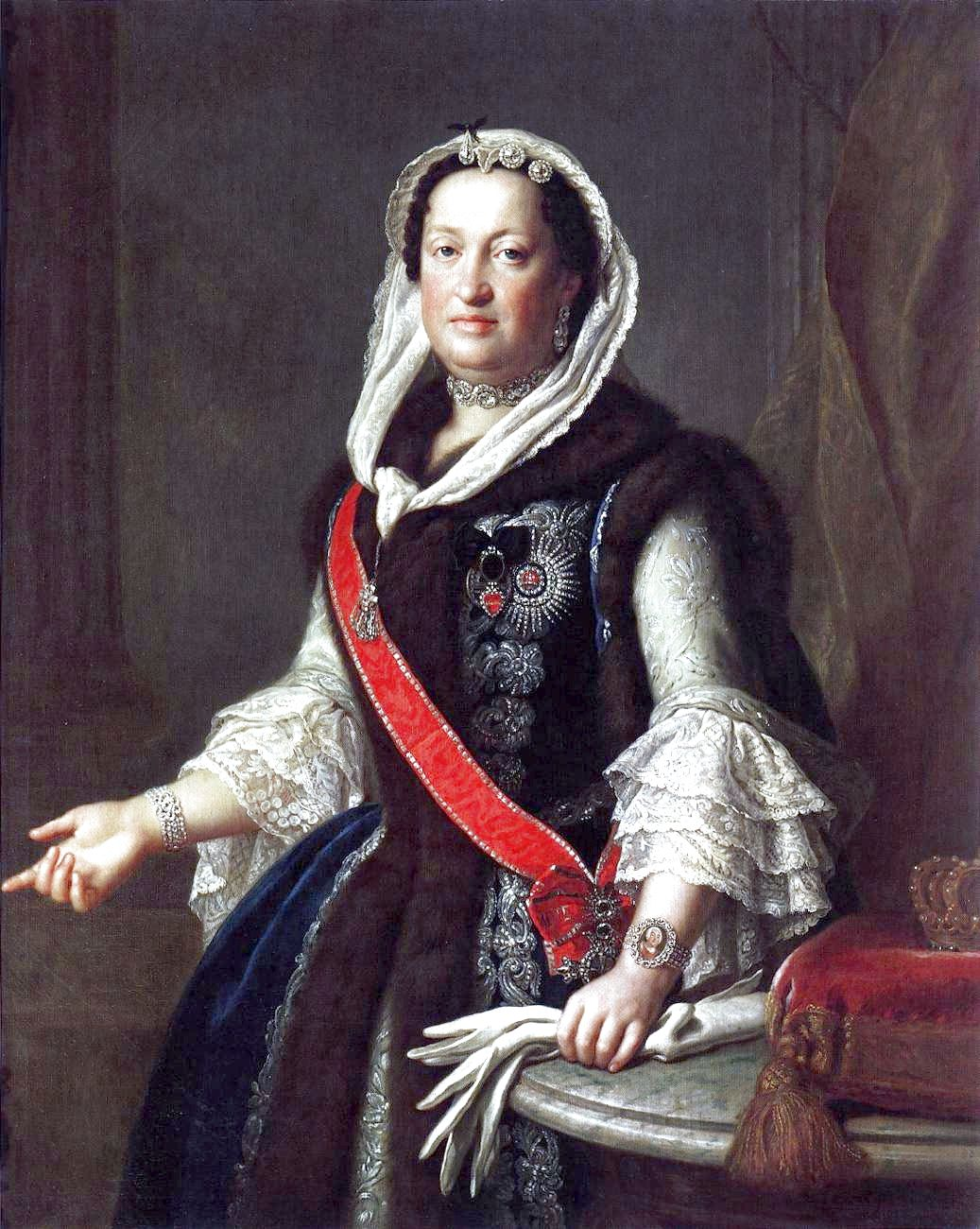
Queen Maria Josepha wearing Polish jupeczka fur garment (by Pietro Rotari, 1755

=== Death ===
During the Seven Years' War, Maria Josepha stayed behind in Dresden with her son, Frederick Christian and his spouse Maria Antonia, after her husband left on 20 October 1756. She remained in Dresden when the city was taken by the Prussian Army. She, as well as Frederick Christian and his spouse Maria Antonia, were all placed under house arrest at the palace of Dresden guarded by a Prussian commandant.

Maria Josepha was banned from writing to her sons, but did engage in correspondence with invisible ink and use her net of correspondents to help her son and daughter-in-law encourage resistance in Saxony against the invading Prussians. Despite several restrictions, she managed to channel secret information about Saxon Field Marshal Maximilian Ulysses Browne, besieged by Frederick the Great at Struppen. On 4 April 1757, her Mistress of the Chamber, Countess Esther Anna Regina von Ogilvy, was arrested. Her last letter of 6 September was sent to the Austrian empress through her exiled son, in which she also states that this would be her last, as she was too heavily guarded.

On 17 November 1757, Maria Josepha died in Dresden of a stroke and was buried in the Wettin vault of the Katholische Hofkirche ("Catholic Court Church") in Dresden.

== Issue ==
Maria Josepha and Frederick Augustus had 14 children recognized by historians:

1. Frederick August of Saxony (1720–1721) died in infancy.
2. Prince Joseph August of Saxony (1721–1728) died in childhood.
3. Frederick Christian, Elector of Saxony (1722–1763) married Maria Antonia of Bavaria and had issue.
4. Maria Amalia of Saxony (1724–1760) married Charles III of Spain and had issue.
5. Maria Margaretha of Saxony (1727–1734) died in childhood.
6. Maria Anna Sophia of Saxony (1728–1797) married Maximilian III Joseph, Elector of Bavaria and had no issue.
7. Francis Xavier of Saxony (1730–1806) married morganatically Maria Chiara Spinucci and had issue.
8. Maria Josepha of Saxony (1731–1767) married Louis, Dauphin of France and had issue.
9. Charles of Saxony (1733–1796) married Countess Franciszka Korwin-Krasińska and had issue.
10. Maria Christina of Saxony (1735–1782) died unmarried.
11. Maria Elisabeth of Saxony (1736–1818) died unmarried.
12. Albert of Saxony (1738–1822) married Maria Christina of Austria and had issue.
13. Clemens Wenceslaus of Saxony (1739–1812) died unmarried.
14. Maria Kunigunde of Saxony (1740–1826) died unmarried.

== Ancestry ==
Ancestors of Maria Josepha of Austria

8. Ferdinand III, Holy Roman Emperor
4. Leopold I, Holy Roman Emperor
9. Maria Anna of Austria
2. Joseph I, Holy Roman Emperor
10. Philip William, Elector Palatine
5. Eleonore Magdalene of Neuburg
11. Elisabeth Amalie of Hesse-Darmstadt
1. Maria Josepha of Austria
12. George, Duke of Brunswick-Calenberg
6. John Frederick, Duke of Brunswick-Calenberg
13. Anne Eleonore of Hesse-Darmstadt
3. Wilhelmine Amalie of Brunswick
14. Edward, Count Palatine of Simmern
7. Benedicta Henrietta of the Palatinate
15. Anne Gonzaga

== Sources ==
- Potter, George R. The New Cambridge Modern History.
- Helen, Watanabe-O'Kelly (2004). "Religion and the Consort: Two Electresses of Saxony and Queens of Poland (1697–1757)". In Campbell Orr, Clarissa (ed.). Queenship in Europe 1660–1815: The Role of the Consort. Cambridge University Press. pp. 252–275. ISBN 0-521-81422-7.

Maria Josepha of Austria House of Habsburg Born: 8 December 1699
Royal titles
| Preceded by Katarzyna Opalińska | Queen consort of Poland; Grand Duchess of Lithuania; 1734–1757 | Vacant |
| Preceded by Christiane Eberhardine of Brandenburg-Bayreuth | Electress consort of Saxony; 1733–1757 | Succeeded by Maria Antonia of Bavaria |
