= Maria Anna Sophia of Saxony =

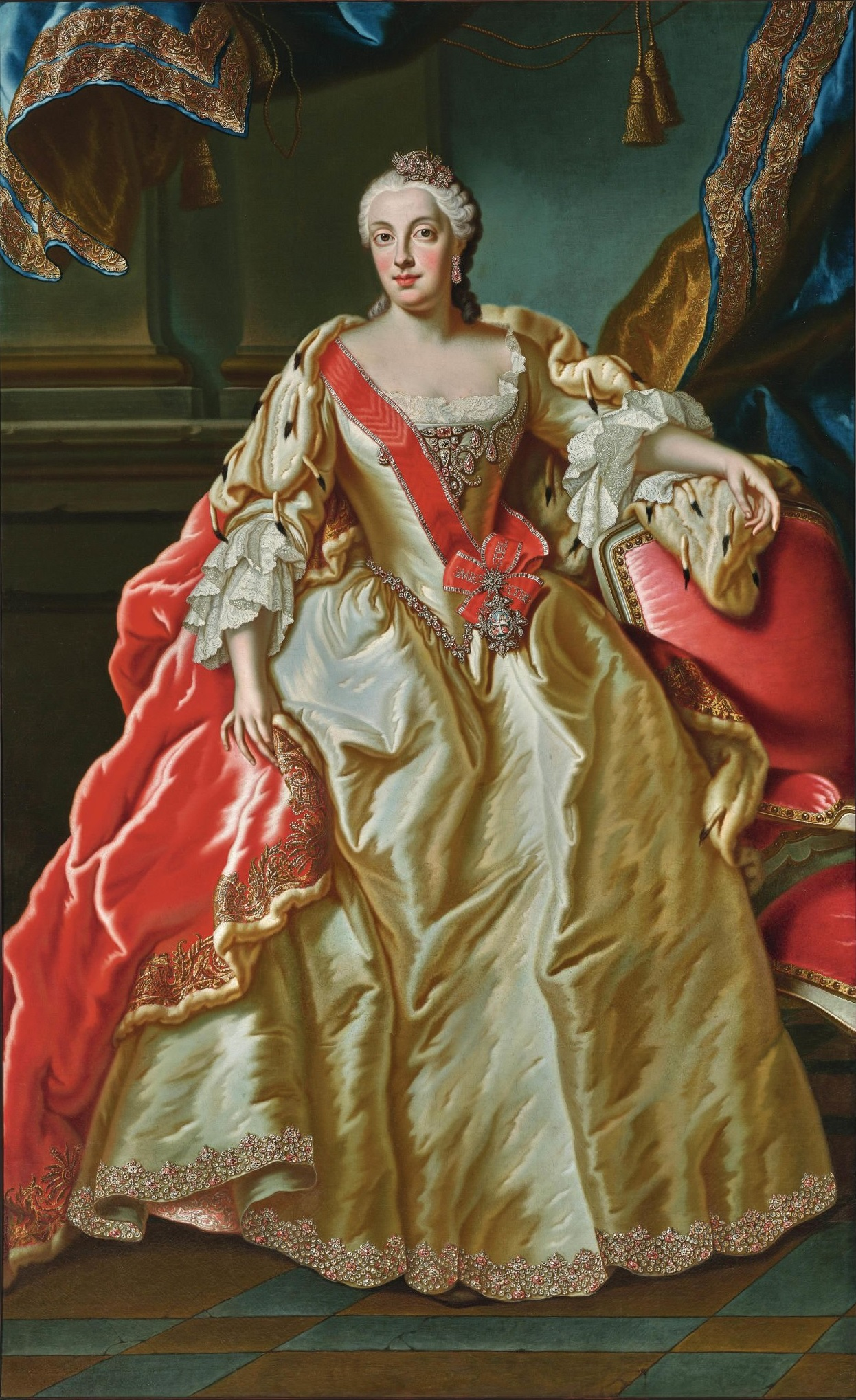

Electress consort of Bavaria
- Tenure: 9 July 1747 – 30 December 1777
- Born: 29 August 1728; Dresden Castle, Dresden
- Died: 17 February 1797 (aged 68); Fürstenried Palace, Munich
- Burial: Theatine Church
- Spouse: Maximilian III Joseph, Elector of Bavaria
Names
- Maria Anna Sophia Sabina Angela Franciska Xaveria
- House: Wettin
- Father: Augustus III of Poland
- Mother: Maria Josepha of Austria

Maria Anna Sophia of Saxony (Maria Anna Sophia Sabina Angela Franciska Xaveria; 29 August 1728 – 17 February 1797) was a daughter of King Augustus III of Poland and his wife Maria Josepha of Austria who became Electress of Bavaria by marriage to Maximilian III Joseph, Elector of Bavaria.

== Biography ==
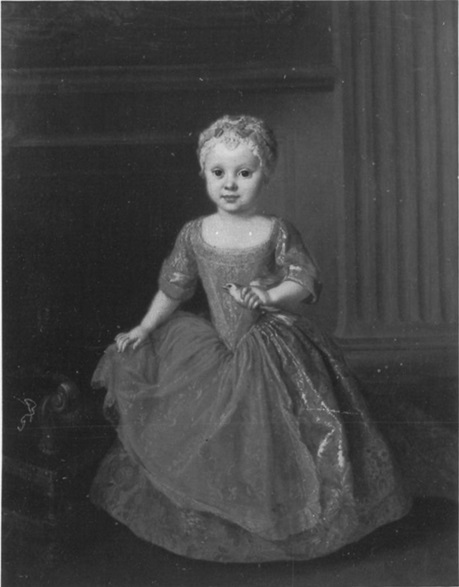
Maria Anna as a child, by Louis de Silvestre. C. 1735.

Maria Anna's parents had sixteen children; her most notable siblings were Frederick Christian, Elector of Saxony, Queen Maria Amalia of Spain and Dauphine Maria Josepha of France, the mother of French Kings Louis XVI, Louis XVIII, and Charles X.

Maria Anna was married to her first cousin, the Bavarian Elector Maximilian III Joseph in 1747.

Having no children of her own, Maria Anna negotiated with King Frederick II of Prussia after her husband's death in 1777 to secure Bavaria's independence against Austria and to support the succession rights of the Wittelsbach branch Palatinate Zweibrücken-Birkenfeld in Bavaria, when the new Elector of Bavaria Charles Theodore attempted to cede Lower Bavaria to Austria. A secret treaty with Holy Roman Emperor Joseph II had been concluded in the end. In exchange for Lower Bavaria, Charles Theodore was to receive the Austrian Netherlands (close to his ancestral domains), the Palatinate (already his patrimony), Jülich and Berg.

However, these plans failed with the War of the Bavarian Succession in 1778, in which King Frederick II stifled the Austrian attempts to exchange the Austrian Netherlands for Bavaria. When Emperor Joseph II tried the scheme again in 1784, Frederick II created the Fürstenbund.

After her husband Maximilian III Joseph died, Maria Anna Sophia spent the rest of her life at Fürstenried Palace and enjoyed the gratitude of the Bavarian people and the heirs of the Zweibrücken-Birkenfeld branch: Charles II, Duke of Zweibrücken, and his brother Maximilian I Joseph of Bavaria, who finally succeeded Charles Theodore in 1799 as first King of Bavaria.

== Ancestry ==
Ancestors of Maria Anna Sophia of Saxony

8. John George III, Elector of Saxony
4. Augustus II of Poland
9. Anne Sophie of Denmark
2. Augustus III of Poland
10. Christian Ernst, Margrave of Brandenburg-Bayreuth
5. Christiane Eberhardine of Brandenburg-Bayreuth
11. Sofie Luise of Württemberg
1. Maria Anna Sophia of Saxony
12. Leopold I, Holy Roman Emperor
6. Joseph I, Holy Roman Emperor
13. Eleonore-Magdalena of Neuburg
3. Maria Josepha of Austria
14. John Frederick, Duke of Brunswick-Lüneburg
7. Wilhelmina Amalia of Brunswick
15. Benedicta-Henrietta of Simmern
