= Maria Chiara Spinucci =

Italian aristocrat (1741–1792)

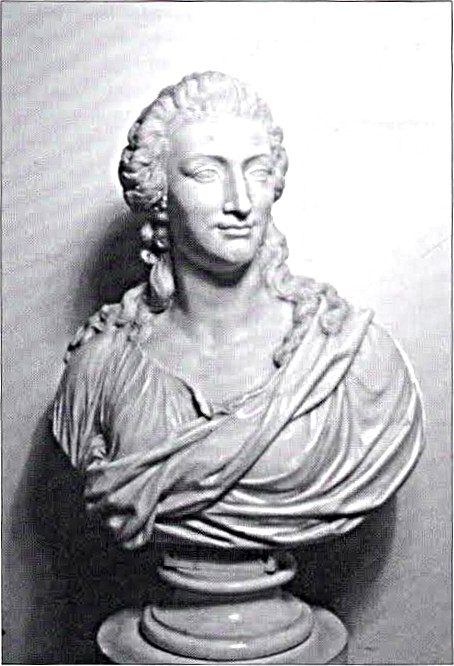
Bust of Maria Chiara Spinucci.

Maria Chiara Spinucci (1741–1792), was an Italian aristocrat, court lady of Duchess Maria Antonia of Bavaria and the morganatic spouse of Prince Francis Xavier of Saxony.

== Early life ==
Maria Chiara was daughter of Count Giuseppe Spinucci (1707–1783) and his wife, Beatrice Vecchi-Buratti (1718–1803). She was younger sister of Cardinal Domenico Spinucci.

== Marriage ==
In Dresden on 9 March 1765, she married Francis Xavier morganatically. The union was keep secret until 1777 when it was formally announced and legitimized.

In 1769, Francis Xavier moved his family to France, the home of his younger sister, the Dauphine Marie-Josèphe, who had died two years earlier. He lived in France for almost twenty years under the assumed title of Count of Lusatia (fr: Comte de Lusace, de: Graf von der Lausitz). In 1774, his nephew, Louis XVI, became the king of the country. Francis Xavier and his family chose to flee France at the beginning of the French Revolution. They moved to Rome; while in Rome, the Prince sat for a bust by Domenico Cardelli.

== Issue ==
During their marriage, Franz Xavier and Maria Chiara had ten children — known as counts and countesses of Lusatia (de: Gräf/Gräfin von der Lausitz) — but only six survived to adulthood:

1. Ludwig Ruprecht Joseph Xavier (Dresden, 27 March 1766 – Pont-sur-Seine, 22 August 1782).
2. Clara Maria Augusta Beatrice (Dresden, 27 March 1766 – Dresden, 18 November 1766), twin with Ludwig.
3. Joseph Xavier Karl Raphael Philipp Benno (Dresden, 23 August 1767 – killed in a duel at Teplitz by Russian prince Nicholas Grigorievich Shcherbatov, 26 June 1802), called "Chevalier de Saxe".
4. Elisabeth Ursula Anna Cordula Xaveria (Dresden, 22 October 1768 – Dresden, 3 May 1844), called "Mademoiselle de Saxe"; married on 8 November 1787 to Henri de Preissac, Duc d'Esclignac.
5. Maria Anna Violente Katharina Martha Xaveria (Siena, 20 October 1770 – Rome, 24 December 1845), married on 15 October 1793 to Principe Don Paluzzo Altieri, Principe di Oriolo and Viano.
6. Beatrix Marie Françoise Brigitte (Chaumot, 1 February 1772 – Dresden, 6 February 1806), married on 18 February 1794 to Don Raffaele Riario-Sforza, Marchese di Corleto.
7. Kunigunde Anna Helena Maria Josepha (Chaumot, 18 March 1774 – Rome, 18 October 1828), married on 1795 to Marchese Don Giovanni Patrizi Patrizi Naro Montoro.
8. Maria Christina Sabina (Pont-sur-Seine, 30 December 1775 – Rome, 20 August 1837), married on 24 March 1796 to Don Camillo Massimiliano Massimo, Prince of Arsoli.
9. Stillborn son (Pont-sur-Seine, 22 December 1777).
10. Cecilie Marie Adelaide Augustine (Pont-sur-Seine, 17 December 1779 – Pont-sur-Seine, 24 June 1781).
