= Prince Francis Xavier of Saxony =

Franz Xavier
- Co-Regent of the Electorate of Saxony
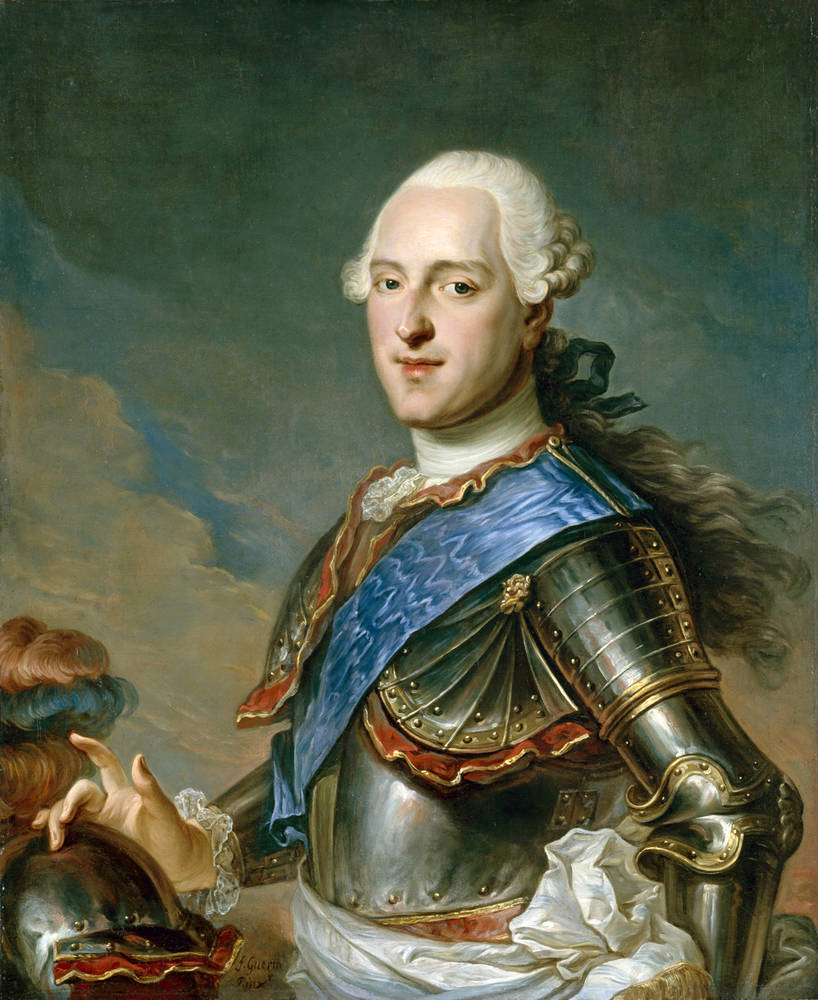
- Portrait by François Guérin, after 1761
- Regency: 17 December 1763 – 23 December 1768
- Born: 25 August 1730; Dresden, Electorate of Saxony, Holy Roman Empire
- Died: 21 June 1806 (aged 75); Dresden, Electorate of Saxony, Holy Roman Empire
- Burial: Katholische Hofkirche
- Spouse: Maria Chiara Spinucci (m. 1765; died 1792)
- Issue Detail: Count Ludwig von der Lausitz; Count Joseph von der Lausitz; Elisabeth de Preissac, Duchesse d'Esclignac; Maria Anna Altieri, Principessa di Oriolo; Beatrix Riario-Sforza, Marchesa di Corleto; Kunigunde Patrizi Naro Montoro, Marchesa di Montoro; Christina Massimo, Principessa di Arsoli
Names
- Franz Xavier Albert August Ludwig Benno
- House: Wettin
- Father: Augustus III of Poland
- Mother: Maria Josepha of Austria

Franz Xavier of Saxony (Polish: Ksawery Saski) (25 August 1730 – 21 June 1806) was a Saxon prince and member of the House of Wettin. He was the fourth but second surviving son of Augustus III, King of Poland and Elector of Saxony, and Maria Josepha of Austria.

== Life ==
=== Regent of Saxony ===
His older brother, Frederick Christian, Elector of Saxony, died on 17 December 1763 after a reign of only 74 days. Franz Xavier took over the regency of the electorate together with his sister-in-law, the Dowager Electress Maria Antonia of Bavaria, on behalf of his nephew, the new Elector Frederick Augustus III. As co-regent, Franz Xavier continued the rationalistic reforms of his brother.

Princes standard

In October 1765, Franz Xavier performed in the name of the young Elector a formal renunciation of the Polish Crown in favor of Stanislaus Poniatowski, as was required by the treaty signed between Prussia and Russia on 11 April 1764. This was done against the wishes of the boy's mother, the Dowager Electress Maria Antonia. During the regency, Franz Xavier attempted to introduce a plan of army reform based upon the Prussian model of Frederick the Great. This brought him into conflict with the estates of the country, who violently refused to implement his proposal because of the high expense associated with his reorganization plan.

According to the regulations imposed by the Golden Bull of 1356, the regency of an underage Elector ended when he reached his eighteenth birthday. As a result, in 1768, the Elector Frederick Augustus III was formally proclaimed an adult, and Franz Xavier ended his functions as the regent of the Electorate of Saxony.

=== Secret marriage, exile and return to Saxony ===
In Dresden on 9 March 1765 Franz Xavier married morganatically an Italian lady-in-waiting to his sister-in-law, the Dowager Electress, the contessa Maria Chiara Spinucci. The union was kept secret until 1777 when it was formally announced and legitimized.

In 1769, Franz Xavier moved his family to France, the home of his younger sister, the Dauphine Marie-Josèphe, who had died two years earlier. He lived in France for almost twenty years under the assumed title of Count of Lusatia (fr: Comte de Lusace, de: Graf von der Lausitz). In 1774, his nephew, Louis XVI, became the king of the country. Franz Xavier and his family chose to flee France at the beginning of the French Revolution. They moved to Rome; while in Rome, the Prince sat for a bust by Domenico Cardelli. His archive was confiscated by the French government in 1793.

After the death of his wife in 1792, he remained in Rome for some years. Eventually, though, he returned to Saxony and settled into Schloss Zabeltitz. Franz Xavier lived there until his death, aged seventy-five.

=== Issue ===
During their marriage, Franz Xavier and Maria Chiara had ten children — known as counts and countesses of Lusatia (de: Graf/Gräfin von der Lausitz) — but only six survived to adulthood:

1. Ludwig Ruprecht Joseph Xavier (Dresden, 27 March 1766 – Pont-sur-Seine, 22 August 1782) died young, unmarried and without issue.
2. Clara Maria Augusta Beatrice (Dresden, 27 March 1766 – Dresden, 18 November 1766), twin with Ludwig, died in infancy.
3. Joseph Xavier Karl Raphael Philipp Benno (Dresden, 23 August 1767 – killed in a duel at Teplitz by Russian prince Nicholas Grigorievich Shcherbatov, 26 June 1802), called "Chevalier de Saxe". Died unmarried and without issue.
4. Elisabeth Ursula Anna Cordula Xaveria (Dresden, 22 October 1768 – Dresden, 3 May 1844), called "Mademoiselle de Saxe"; married on 8 November 1787 to Henri de Preissac, Duc d'Esclignac.
5. Maria Anna Violente Katharina Martha Xaveria (Siena, 20 October 1770 – Rome, 24 December 1845), married on 15 October 1793 to Principe Don Paluzzo Altieri, Principe di Oriolo and Viano.
6. Beatrix Marie Françoise Brigitte (Chaumot, 1 February 1772 – Dresden, 6 February 1806), married on 18 February 1794 to Don Raffaele Riario-Sforza, Marchese di Corleto.
7. Kunigunde Anna Helena Maria Josepha (Chaumot, 18 March 1774 – Rome, 18 October 1828), married on 1795 to Marchese Don Giovanni Patrizi Patrizi Naro Montoro.
8. Maria Christina Sabina (Pont-sur-Seine, 30 December 1775 – Rome, 20 August 1837), married on 24 March 1796 to Don Camillo Massimiliano Massimo, Prince of Arsoli.
9. Stillborn son (Pont-sur-Seine, 22 December 1777).
10. Cecilie Marie Adelaide Augustine (Pont-sur-Seine, 17 December 1779 – Pont-sur-Seine, 24 June 1781) died in early childhood.

== In literature ==
Victorine Chastenay recalls a childhood stay with Prince Francis Xavier in her Mémoires: Je ne crois pas qu'il passât pour avoir de l'esprit. Il m'eût intéressée plus tard : cet homme avait connu une passion violente, et, marié depuis près de vingt ans, il était encore amoureux ! [transl. "I don't think he was known for his intellect. He would have interested me if I had been older: this man had known a violent passion, and, married for more than twenty years, he was still in love!"]

== Ancestry ==
Ancestors of Prince Francis Xavier of Saxony

8. John George III, Elector of Saxony
4. Augustus II of Poland
9. Anna Sophie of Denmark
2. Augustus III of Poland
10. Christian Ernst, Margrave of Brandenburg-Bayreuth
5. Christiane Eberhardine of Bayreuth
11. Sophie Louise of Württemberg
1. Prince Franz Xaver of Saxony
12. Leopold I, Holy Roman Emperor
6. Joseph I, Holy Roman Emperor
13. Eleonore Magdalene of Neuburg
3. Maria Josepha of Austria
14. John Frederick, Duke of Brunswick
7. Wilhelmine Amalie of Brunswick
15. Benedicta Henrietta of the Palatinate
