= Augustus III of Poland =

Ruler of Poland–Lithuania from 1733 to 1763

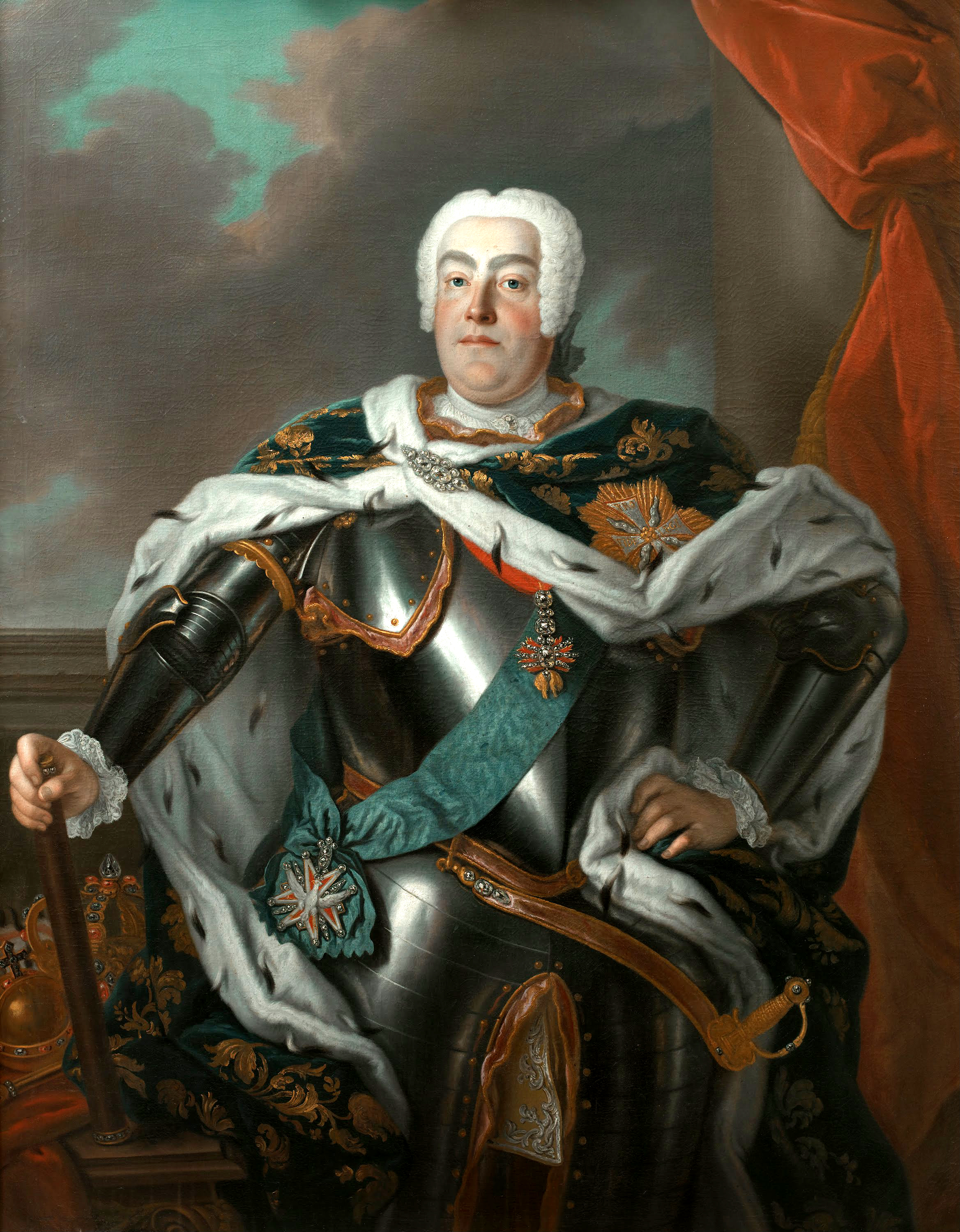
- Portrait by Louis de Silvestre

King of Poland Grand Duke of Lithuania
- Reign: 5 October 1733 – 5 October 1763 (Note: Contested by Stanisław Leszczyński until 26 January 1736.)
- Coronation: 17 January 1734; Wawel Cathedral, Kraków
- Predecessor: Stanisław Leszczyński
- Successor: Stanisław August Poniatowski

Elector of Saxony
- Reign: 1 February 1733 – 5 October 1763
- Predecessor: Frederick Augustus I
- Successor: Frederick Christian
- Born: 17 October 1696; Dresden, Electorate of Saxony, Holy Roman Empire
- Died: 5 October 1763 (aged 66); Dresden, Electorate of Saxony, Holy Roman Empire
- Burial: Dresden Cathedral, Dresden
- Spouse: Maria Josepha of Austria (m. 1719; died 1757)
- Issue More...: Frederick Christian, Elector of Saxony; Maria Amalia, Queen of Spain; Maria Anna, Electress of Bavaria; Prince Francis Xavier of Saxony; Maria Josepha, Dauphine of France; Charles, Duke of Courland; Maria Christina, Abbess of Remiremont; Princess Maria Elisabeth; Albert Casimir, Duke of Teschen; Clemens Wenceslaus, Archbishop-Elector of Trier; Maria Kunigunde, Abbess of Essen
- House: Wettin (Albertine line)
- Father: Augustus II of Poland
- Mother: Christiane Eberhardine of Brandenburg-Bayreuth
- Religion: Catholic (from 1712); Lutheran (until 1712)

Augustus III of Poland (German: August III.; Polish: August III Sas – "the Saxon"; Lithuanian: Augustas III; 17 October 1696 – 5 October 1763) was King of Poland and Grand Duke of Lithuania from 1733 until 1763, as well as Elector of Saxony in the Holy Roman Empire where he was known as Frederick Augustus II (German: Friedrich August II.).

He was the only legitimate son of Augustus II the Strong, and converted to Catholicism in 1712 to secure his candidacy for the Polish throne. In 1719, he married Maria Josepha of Austria, daughter of Joseph I, Holy Roman Emperor, and became elector of Saxony following his father's death in 1733. Augustus III was able to gain the support of Charles VI by agreeing to the Pragmatic Sanction of 1713 and also gained recognition from Russian Empress Anna by supporting Russia's claim to the region of Courland. He was elected king of Poland by a small minority on 5 October 1733 and subsequently banished the former Polish king Stanisław I. He was crowned in Kraków on 17 January 1734.

Augustus was supportive of Austria against Prussia in the War of Austrian Succession and again in the Seven Years' War (1756), both of which resulted in Saxony being defeated and occupied by Prussia. In Poland, his rule was marked by the increasing influence of the Czartoryski and Poniatowski families, and by the intervention of Catherine the Great in Polish affairs. His rule deepened the social anarchy in Poland and increased the country's dependence on its neighbours, notably Prussia, Austria, and Russia. The Russian Empire prevented him from installing his family on the Polish throne, supporting the aristocrat Stanisław August Poniatowski, the lover of Catherine the Great. Throughout his reign, Augustus was known to be more interested in ease and pleasure than in the affairs of state; this notable patron of the arts left the administration of Saxony and Poland to his chief adviser, Heinrich von Brühl, who in turn left Polish administration chiefly to the powerful Czartoryski family.

== Biography ==
=== Early life and education ===
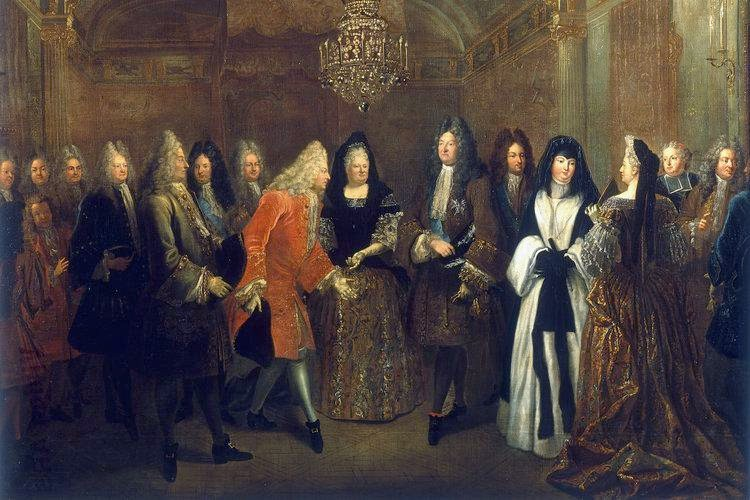
Reception of Augustus at Versailles by Louis XIV, 1714

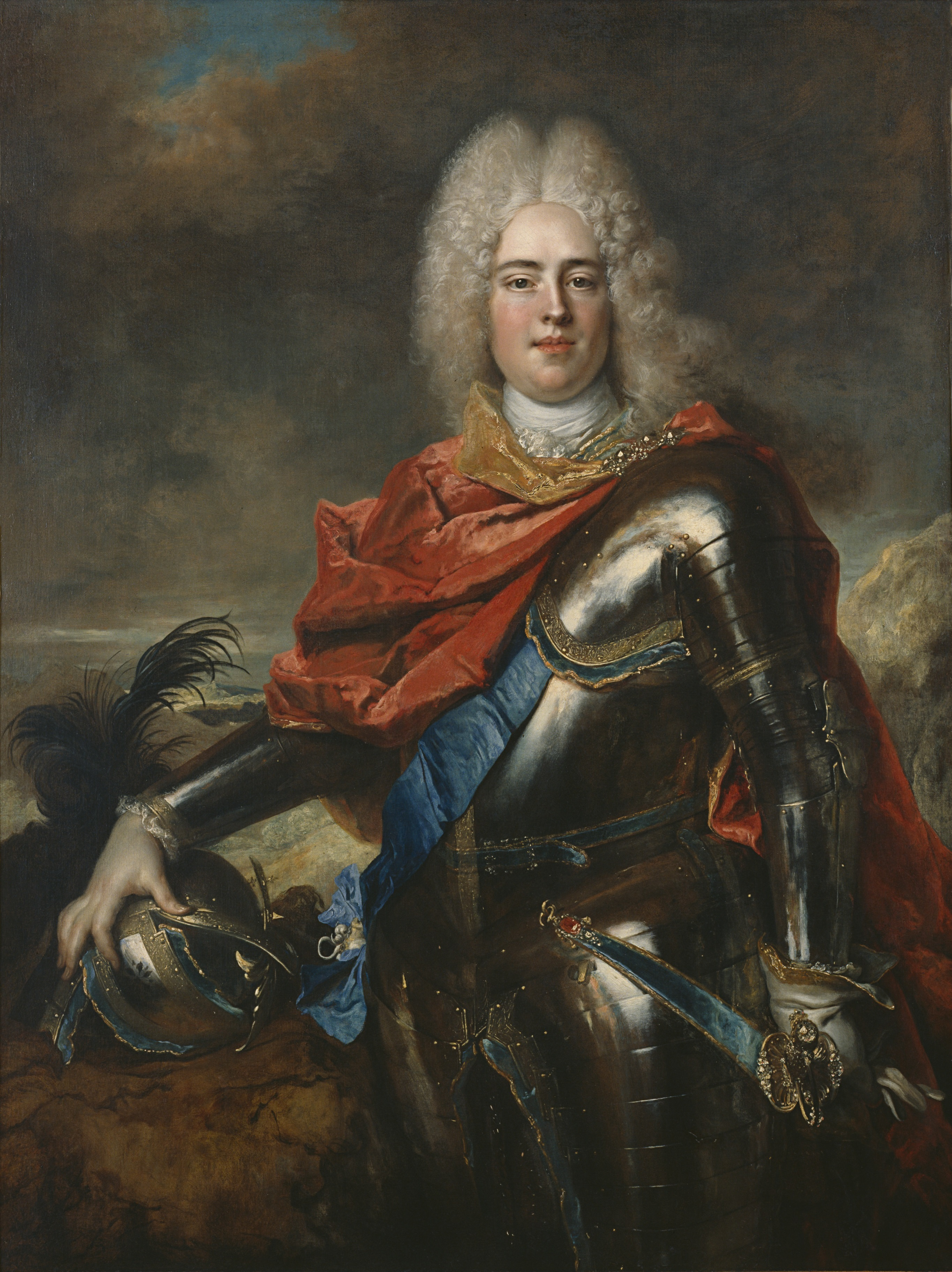
Augustus, aged 19 years in 1715 by Nicolas de Largillière

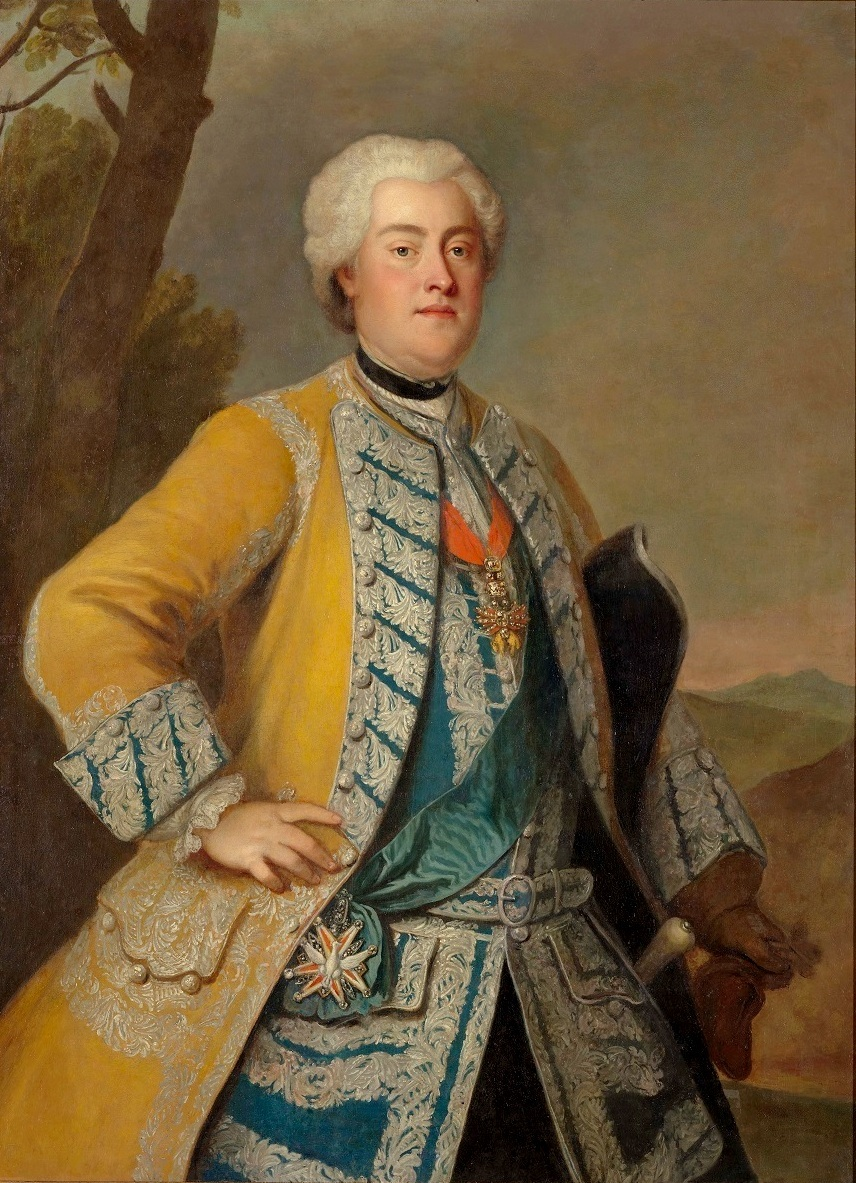
Prince Frederick Augustus, by Louis de Silvestre, 1727

Augustus was born 17 October 1696 in Dresden, the only legitimate son of Augustus II the Strong, Prince-Elector of Saxony and ruler of the Polish–Lithuanian Commonwealth who belonged to the Albertine branch of the House of Wettin. His mother was Christiane Eberhardine of Brandenburg-Bayreuth, daughter of Christian Ernst, Margrave of Brandenburg-Bayreuth. Unlike his father, Christiane remained a fervent Protestant throughout her life and never set foot in Catholic Poland during her 30-year service as queen consort. Despite the pressure from Augustus II, she was never crowned at Wawel in Kraków and purely held a titular title of queen. This move was viewed by the Polish nobility as a provocation and from the beginning, the prince was treated with prejudice in Poland.

From his early years, Augustus was groomed to succeed as king of Poland-Lithuania; the best tutors were hired from across the continent and the prince studied Polish, German, French and Latin. He was taught Russian, but was unable to speak it fluently, as well as exact sciences including mathematics, chemistry and geography. He also practiced equestrianism in his youth. While his father spent time in Poland, the young Augustus was left in the care of his grandmother, Princess Anna Sophie of Denmark, who initially raised him Lutheran. This was particularly unfavourable for the Poles, who wouldn't accept or tolerate a Protestant monarch. As a consequence, a troubled Augustus II organised a tour of Catholic countries in Europe for his son, which he hoped would bring him closer to Catholicism and break the bond between him and his controlling grandmother. In Venice, the Polish entourage thwarted a kidnapping attempt organised by British agents of Queen Anne in order to prevent him from converting. He also witnessed the coronation of Charles VI in 1711 after the death of his brother and predecessor, Joseph I.

Augustus eventually converted to Catholicism in November 1712 while extensively touring Italy, and its cultural and religious heritage. He was then under the supervision of the Jesuits, who certainly contributed to the cause. The public announcement of conversion in 1717 triggered discontent among the Protestant Saxon aristocracy. Faced with a hereditary Catholic succession for Saxony, Prussia and Hanover attempted to oust Saxony from the directorship of the Protestant body in the Reichstag of the Holy Roman Empire, but Saxony managed to retain the directorship.

On 26 September 1714, Augustus was warmly welcomed by Louis XIV at Versailles. Louis rejoiced when he heard that Augustus had converted to Catholicism and permitted him to stay at the royal court and in Paris. The young prince participated in balls, masquerades and private parties that were hosted by the Sun King himself. During this time, Augustus improved his knowledge of the French language and learnt how to approach politics and diplomacy. In June 1715, he departed Versailles and travelled across France, visiting Bordeaux, Moissac, Toulouse, Carcassonne, Marseille and Lyon. Apart from sightseeing, the purpose of this trip was to understand how cities and villages function. Being brought up in great wealth, Augustus was not entirely aware of how extensive poverty and poor living conditions could be in the countryside.

=== Marriage and wedding ===
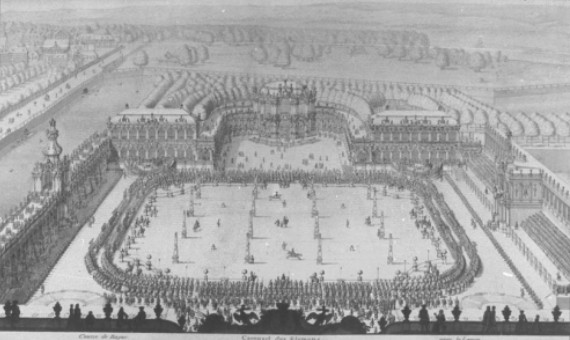
Wedding reception of Augustus III and Maria Josepha at the Zwinger Palace in Dresden, 1719

Royal Monogram of King Augustus III of Poland.

On 20 August 1719, Augustus married Maria Josepha of Austria in Vienna. She was the daughter of the deceased Emperor Joseph I and niece of Charles VI of the Holy Roman Empire, whose coronation young Augustus attended. This marriage wasn't coincidental; Augustus II the Strong orchestrated it to maintain the position of the Saxons within the Holy Roman Empire. The alliance with Catholic Charles would prove fruitful in case of hostile or armed opposition from the Protestant states within the Empire. Ten days earlier, on 10 August 1719, Maria Josepha was forced to renounce her claim to the throne of Austria in favour of her uncle's daughter, Maria Theresa. In accordance with the Pragmatic Sanction of 1713 issued by Charles, a female heir or the eldest daughter would be permitted to inherit the throne of Austria. Augustus II also hoped to place Saxony in a better position should there arise a war of succession to the Austrian territories.

The wedding celebration in Dresden was one of the most splendid and expensive of the Baroque era in Europe. Over 800 guests were invited for a 2-week celebration. The main banquet was held in a chamber that was transformed into an artificial silver mine to astound the invitees. Apart from exotic dishes, over 500 deer were brought in from the Białowieża Forest for the feast. Approximately 4 million thalers were spent for this occasion.

=== Succession ===
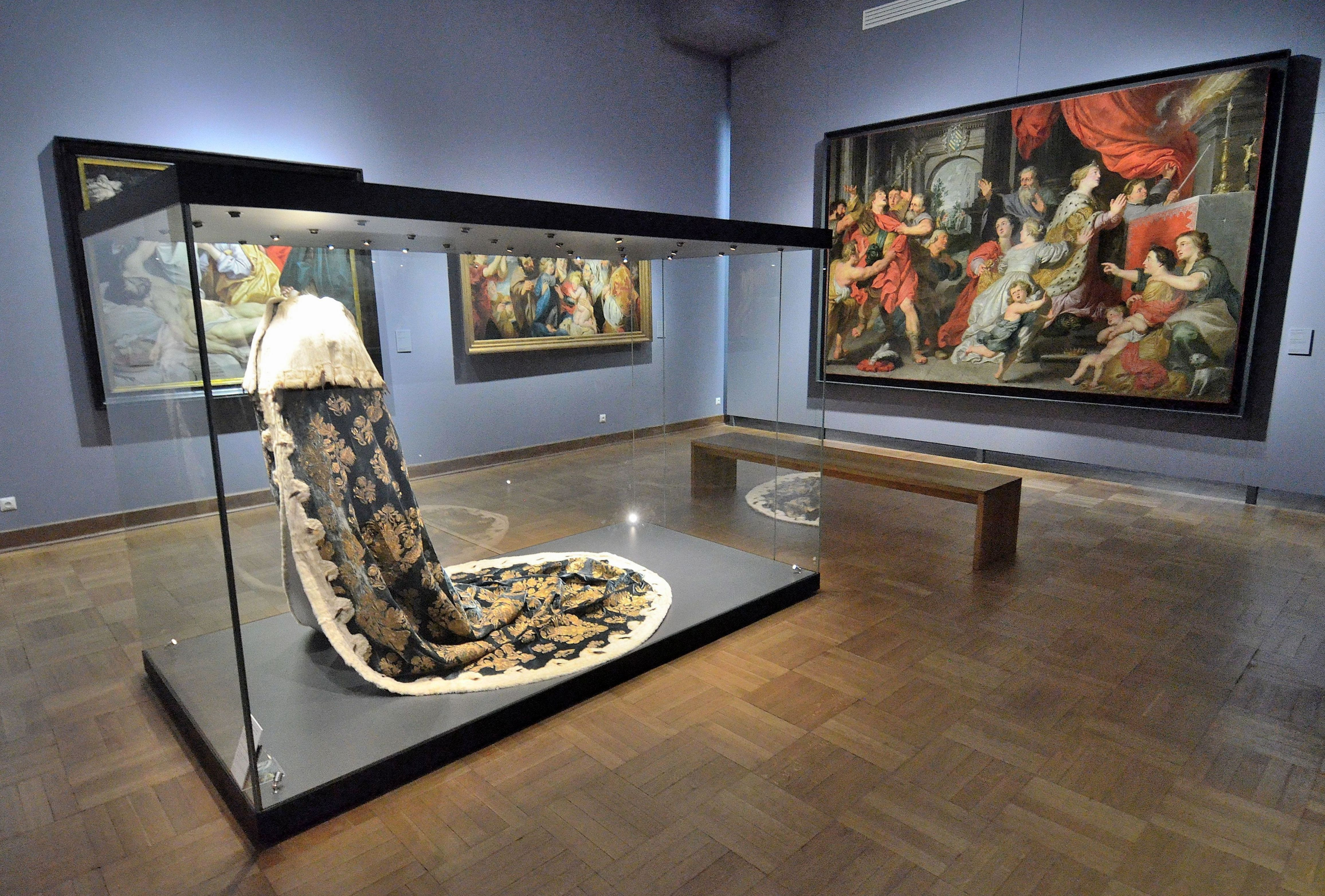
Coronation mantle of Augustus III, National Museum in Warsaw

Augustus II died suddenly on 1 February 1733, following a Sejm (Polish parliament) session in Warsaw. Augustus III inherited the Saxon electorate without any problems, but his election to the Polish throne was much more complicated. Shortly before the ailing king died, Prussia, Austria and Russia signed a pact known as the Treaty of the Three Black Eagles, which would prevent Augustus III and Stanisław Leszczyński from inheriting the Polish throne. The royal elections in Poland and the elective monarchy, in general, weakened the country and allowed other powers to meddle in Polish affairs. The neighbouring countries that signed the treaty preferred a neutral monarch like Infante Manuel, Count of Ourém, brother of John V of Portugal, or any living relative of the Piast dynasty. The agreement had provisions for all three powers to agree that it was in their best interest that their common neighbour, the Polish–Lithuanian Commonwealth, did not undertake any reforms that might strengthen it and trigger expansionism. The new king would also have to maintain friendly relations with these countries.

The treaty quickly became ineffective as Prussia began to support Leszczyński and allowed him safe passage from France to Poland through German lands. As a result, Austria and Russia signed on 19 August 1733 the Löwenwolde's Treaty, named after Karl Gustav von Löwenwolde. The terms of Löwenwolde's Treaty were direct; Russia opted for a quid pro quo – they would provide troops to ensure Augustus III was elected king and in turn, Augustus would recognise Anna of Russia as Empress of Russia, thus relinquishing Polish claims to Livonia and Courland. Austria received a promise that as king, Augustus would both renounce any claim to the Austrian succession and continue respecting the Pragmatic Sanction of 1713.

=== War of the Polish Succession ===
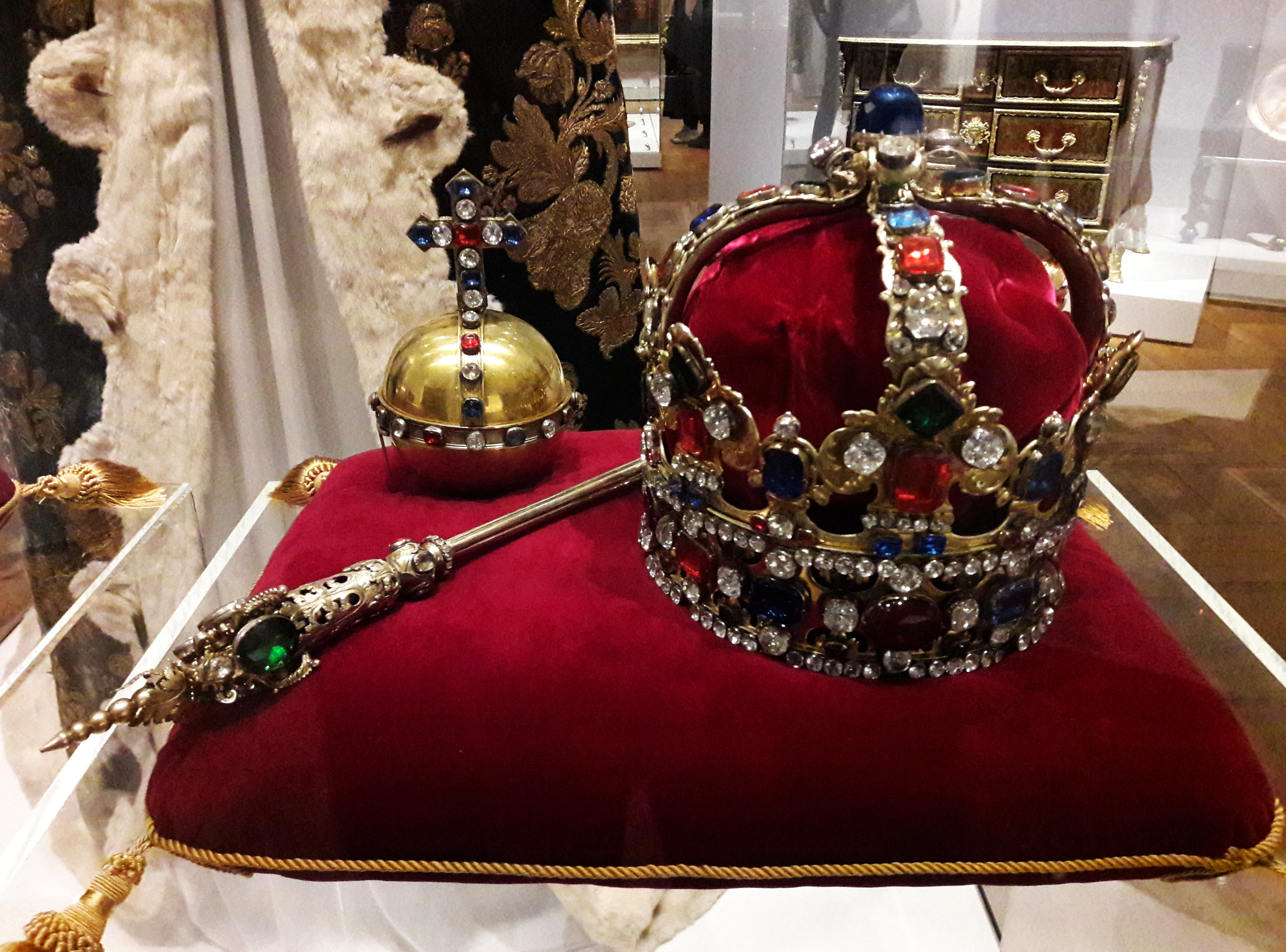
Royal Polish Regalia of Augustus III, made around the time of the Succession War

Augustus, in his candidacy to the Polish throne, was opposed by Stanisław Leszczyński, who had usurped the throne with Swedish support during the Great Northern War. Reigning from 1706 until 1709, Stanisław was overthrown after the Swedish defeat at Poltava. Returning from exile in 1733 with the support of Louis XV of France and Philip V of Spain, Stanisław sparked the War of the Polish Succession.

Throughout the spring and summer of 1733, France began mobilising and stationing forces along its northern and eastern borders, while Austria massed troops on the Polish frontier, reducing garrisons in the Duchy of Milan for the purpose. Prince Eugene of Savoy recommended to the emperor a more warlike posture against its longtime rival, France. He suggested that the Rhine valley and northern Italy should be strengthened with more troops; only minimal steps were taken to improve imperial defences on the Rhine. In July 1733, Augustus agreed to Austria's and Russia's terms per Löwenwolde's Treaty. During the election sejm in August, Russian troops counting 30,000 men under the command of Peter Lacy, entered Poland to secure Augustus' succession. The election was de jure won by Stanisław, with 12,000 votes. Augustus received 3,000; however, he had the support of Poland's influential, wealthiest and most corrupt magnates, such as Michał Serwacy Wiśniowiecki.

The Franco-Spanish coalition declared war on Austria and Saxony on 10 October. The Italian states of Savoy-Sardinia and Parma also joined the struggle against Austrian rule in northern Italy. Most of the battles took place outside of Poland and the main focus of the war was personal interests and the demonstration of superiority. The Russian-Saxon forces chased Stanisław until he was besieged at Gdańsk (Danzig) on 22 February 1734. In June, when the garrisons at Gdańsk surrendered, Stanisław fled to Königsberg and then back to France. The Pacification Sejm in 1736 de facto confirmed Augustus III as King of Poland and Grand Duke of Lithuania.

To this day, the aphorism and phrase od Sasa do Lasa (lit. from the Saxon to Leszczyński) exists in the Polish language and is used when describing two opposite things in everyday life.

=== Reign and diplomacy ===
==== Poland ====
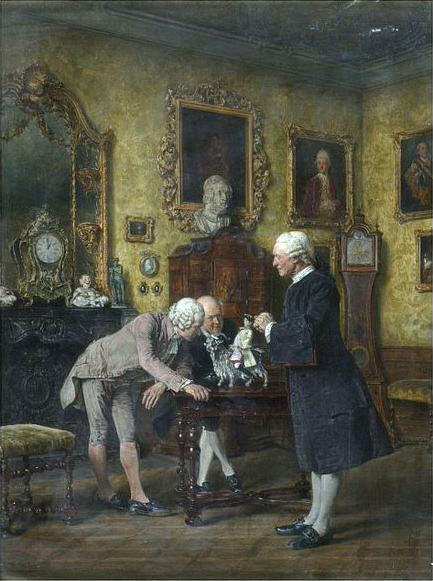
Count von Brühl exhibiting his extravagant Meissen porcelain. Brühl was the viceroy of Poland and headed the Saxon court.

As King, Augustus was uninterested in the affairs of his Polish–Lithuanian dominion, focusing instead on hunting, opera and the collection of artwork at the Gemäldegalerie Alte Meister. He spent less than three years of his thirty-year reign in Poland, where political feuding between the House of Czartoryski and the Potocki paralysed the Sejm (Liberum veto), fostering internal political anarchy and weakening the Commonwealth. Augustus delegated most of his powers and responsibilities in the Commonwealth to Heinrich von Brühl, who served in effect as the viceroy of Poland. Brühl, in turn, left the politics in Poland to the most powerful magnates and nobles, which resulted in widespread corruption. Under Augustus, Poland was not involved in any major conflicts, which further lessened its position in Europe and allowed the neighbouring countries to take advantage of the disorder. Any opposition was violently crushed by Brühl, who used either Saxon or Russian forces that were permanently stationed in the country.

Brühl was a skillful diplomat and strategist; Augustus could only be reached through him if an important political feud arose. He was also the head of the Saxon court in Dresden and was fond of collectables, such as gadgets, jewellery and Meissen porcelain, the most famous being the Swan Service composed of 2,200 individual pieces made between 1737 and 1741. It has been described as possibly "the finest table service ever produced" and part of it are exhibited at the National Museum in Warsaw. He also owned the largest collections of watches, vests, wigs and hats in Europe, though this cannot be accurately assessed. Brühl was depicted by his rivals as a nouveau-riche materialist, who used his wealth to gain support. His lavish spending was immortalised by Augustus' reported question to the viceroy, "Brühl, do I have money?"

By 1748, Augustus III completed extending the Saxon Palace in Warsaw and made significant contributions in remodelling the Royal Castle. In 1750, von Brühl purchased a residence adjacent to the larger Saxon Palace and transformed it into a rococo masterpiece, which later became known as the Brühl Palace. Both buildings were destroyed by the Nazis during World War II.

==== War of the Austrian Succession ====
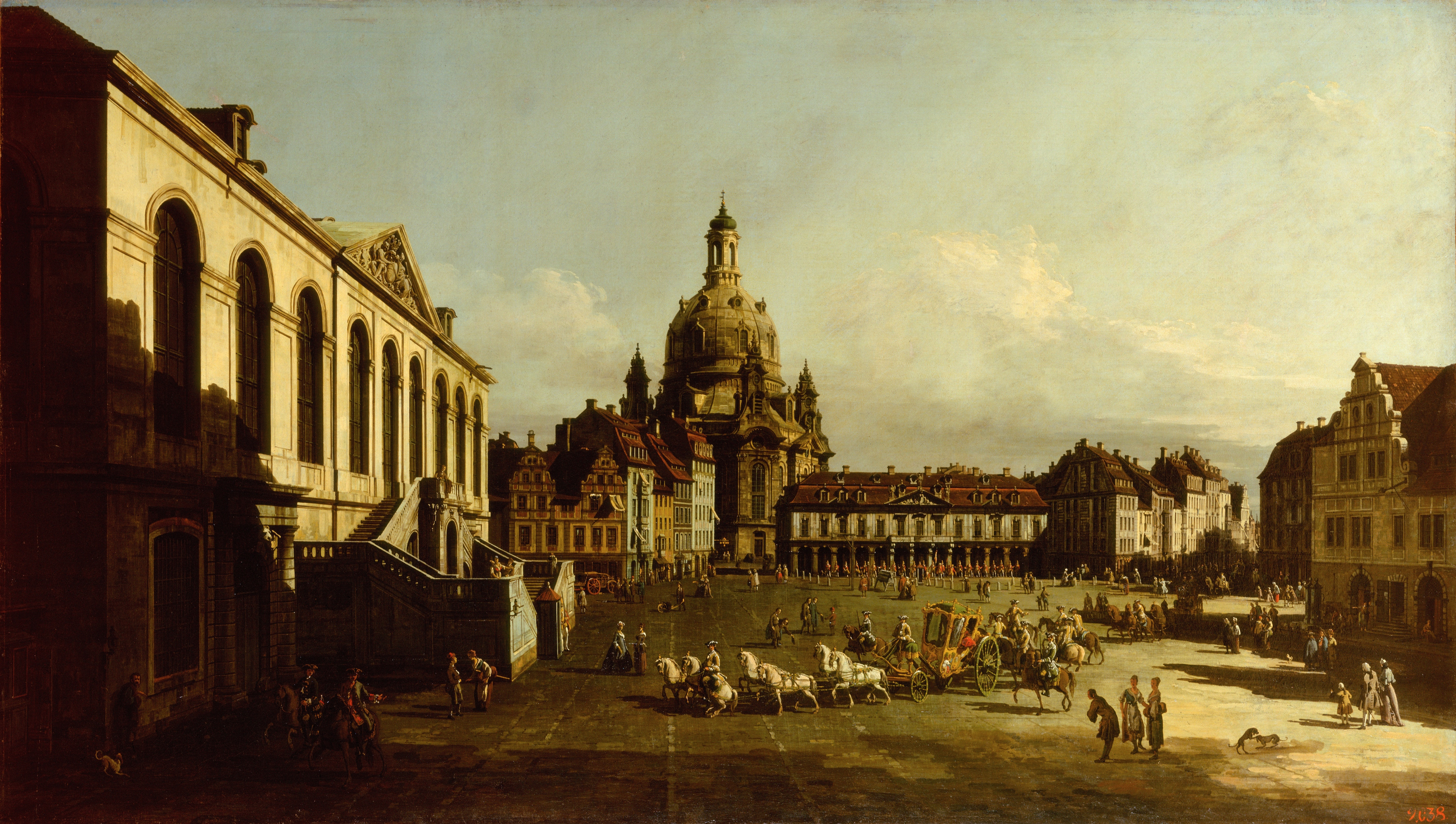
View of Dresden's Neumarkt in 1747, by Bernardo Bellotto

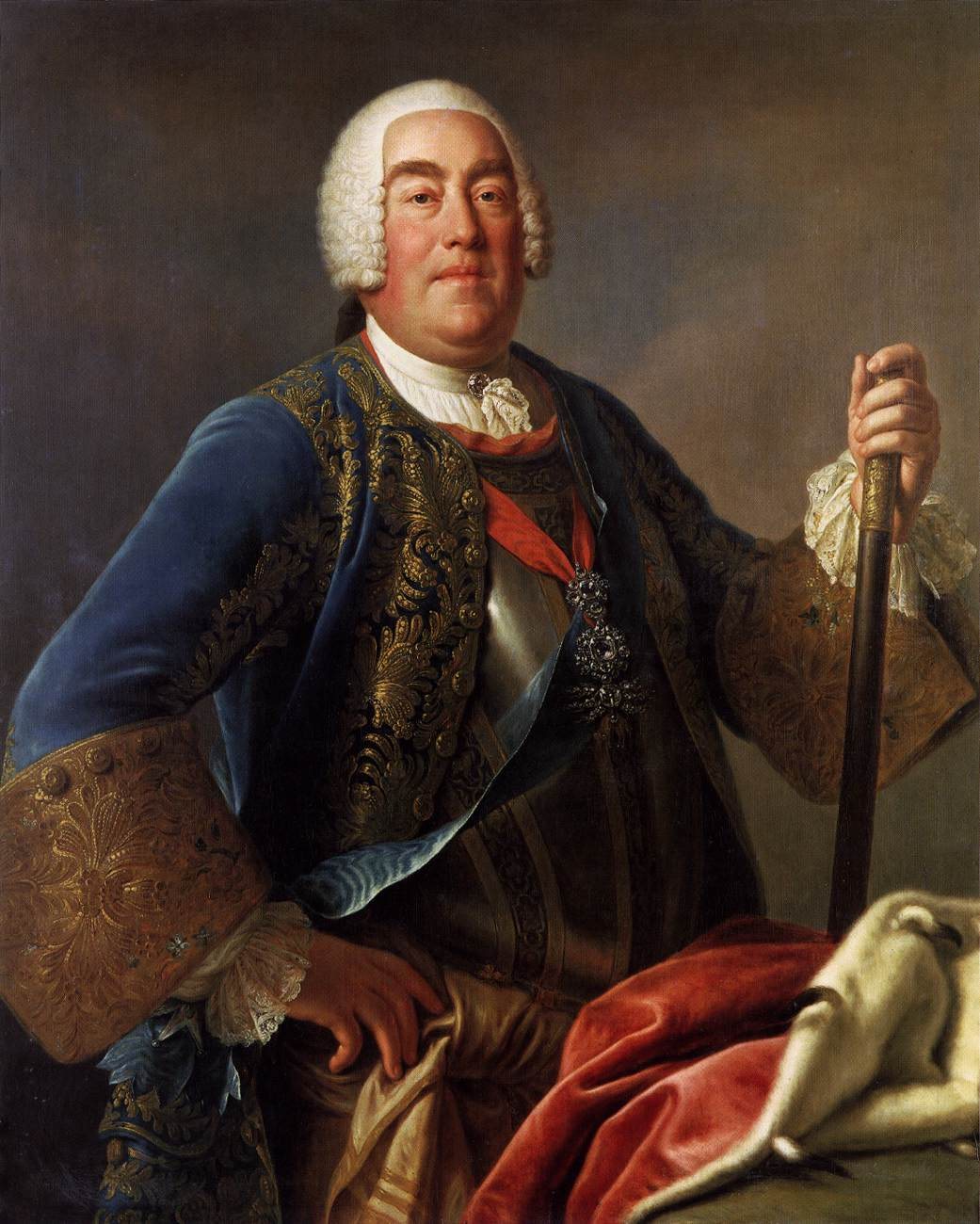
Augustus III by Rotari, 1755

With the marriage to the Austrian princess Maria Josepha, Augustus was bound to accept the succession of her cousin, Maria Theresa, as Archduchess of Austria and Queen of Hungary and Bohemia. Saxony mediated between the friendly French faction and the Habsburg faction of Maria Theresa. Between 1741 and 1742, Saxony was allied with France, but changed sides with the help of Austrian diplomats.

In the first days of December 1740, the Prussians assembled along the Oder river and on 16 December, Frederick II invaded Silesia without a formal declaration of war. The Austrian troops, which were then stationed in Silesia, were poorly supplied and outnumbered as the Habsburgs concentrated their supreme force on Hungary and Italy. They held onto the fortresses of Glogau, Breslau, and Brzeg, but abandoned the rest of the region and withdrew into Moravia. This campaign gave Prussia control of most of the richest provinces in the Habsburg monarchy, with the commercial centre of Breslau as well as mining, weaving and dyeing industries. Silesia was also rich in natural resources such as coal, chalk, copper and gold.

Saxony joined Austria in the Second Silesian War, which erupted after Prussia proclaimed its support of Charles VII as Holy Roman Emperor and invaded Bohemia on 15 August 1744. The true cause behind the invasion was Frederick's personal expansionist ideas and goals. On 8 January 1745, the Treaty of Warsaw united Great Britain, the Habsburg monarchy, the Dutch Republic and Saxony into what became known as the "Quadruple Alliance", which was aimed at securing the Austrian throne for Maria Theresa. Soon after, Charles VII died of gout in Munich, which weakened the Prussians. However, Prussia still maintained military superiority; the successful battles of Hennersdorf and Kesselsdorf opened the way to Dresden, which Frederick occupied on 18 December. The Treaty of Dresden was eventually completed on Christmas Day (25 December) and Saxony was obliged to pay one million rixdollars in reparations to the Prussian state. The treaty ended the Second Silesian War with a status quo ante bellum.

Maria Theresa was finally recognised in her inheritance with the Treaty of Aix-la-Chapelle in 1748, which proved a Pyrrhic victory for Augustus III; the conflict nearly bankrupted Saxony. Meanwhile, the affairs in Poland remained highly neglected.

==== Seven Years' War ====
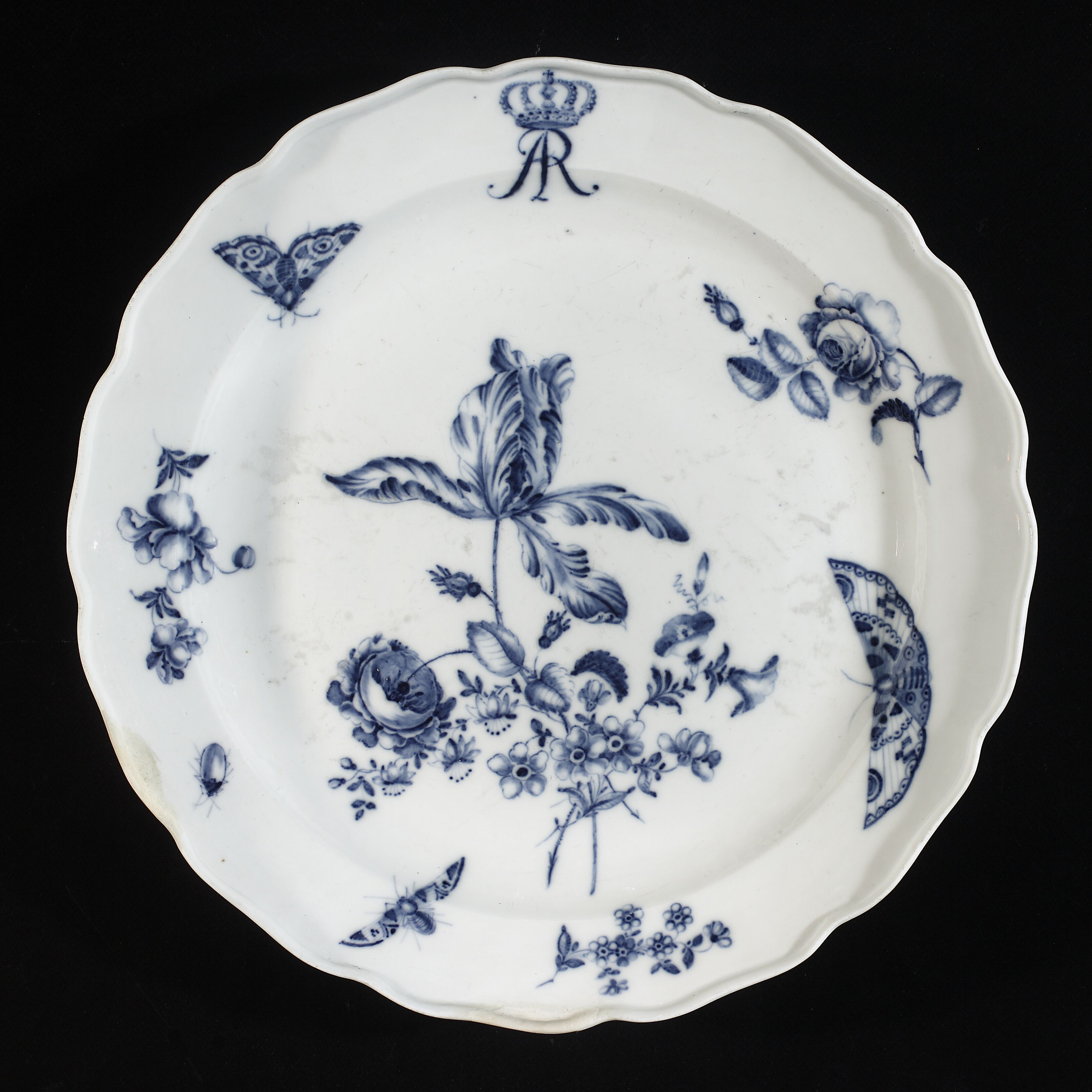
A Meissen porcelain platter from Augustus III's dinner set for the Warsaw Royal Castle. The service was delivered to Warsaw in August 1756, where it was used by the king during the Seven Years' War and is currently held at the National Museum in Warsaw.

The Electorate of Saxony was involved in the Seven Years' War from 1756 to 1763. The Saxons were allied with Austria and Russia against Frederick the Great of Prussia, who saw Saxony as another potential field for expansion. Saxony was then merely a buffer zone between Prussia and the Austrian Bohemia as well as Silesia, which Frederick attempted to annex in their entirety. Moreover, Saxony and Poland were separated by a strip of land in Silesia and Lusatia, which made the movement of troops even more difficult. Frederick's plans also entailed annexing the Electorate of Hanover, but joining France would trigger an Austro-Russian attack and occupation. On 29 August 1756, the Prussian Army preemptively invaded Saxony, beginning the Third Silesian War, a theatre of the Seven Years' War. Saxony was bled dry and exploited to the maximum extent to support Prussia's war effort. The Treaty of Hubertusburg, signed on 15 February 1763, ended the conflict with Frederick's victory and Saxony renounced its claim to Silesia.

=== Death ===
In April 1763, Augustus returned ill and frail from Poland to Dresden with his closest advisors, leaving Primate Władysław Aleksander Łubieński behind to take care of the affairs in the Commonwealth. He died suddenly on 5 October 1763 in Dresden from apoplexy (stroke). Unlike his father, who rests at Wawel in Kraków, Augustus III was buried at Dresden Cathedral and remains one of the few Polish monarchs who were buried outside of Poland.

Augustus's eldest surviving son, Frederick Christian, succeeded his father as elector but died two and a half months later.

In the Commonwealth, on 7 September 1764, with the small participation of the szlachta initiated by the Czartoryski's and the strong support of Russia, Stanisław August Poniatowski was elected king of Poland and Grand Duke of Lithuania. Reigning under the name Stanisław II Augustus, Poniatowski was the son of the elder Stanisław Poniatowski, a powerful Polish noble and a onetime agent of Stanisław I; in youth, he was a lover of Catherine the Great of Russia, and as such enjoyed strong support from that Empress's court.

== Legacy ==
=== Patron of the arts ===
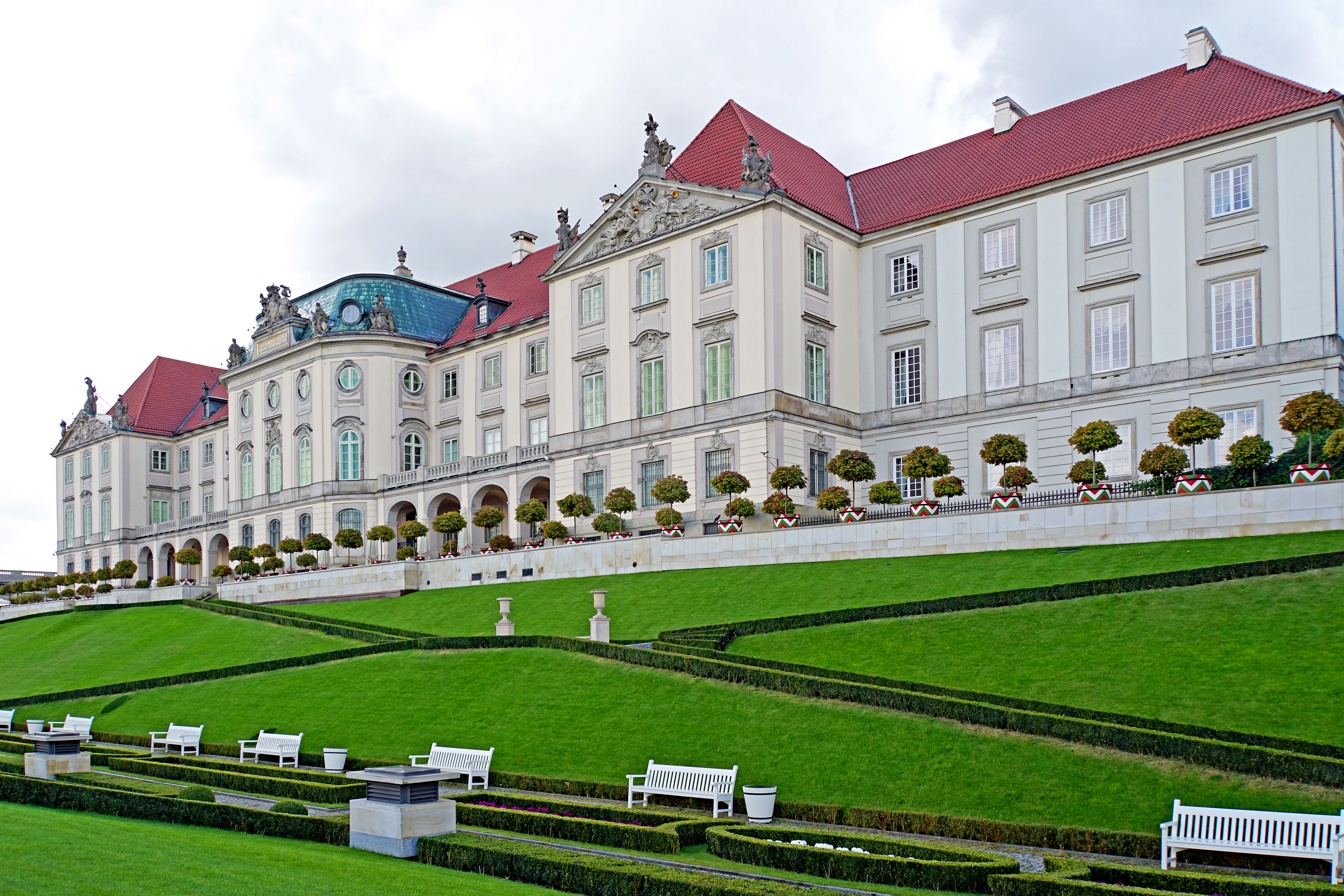
Saxon Facade of the Royal Castle in Warsaw

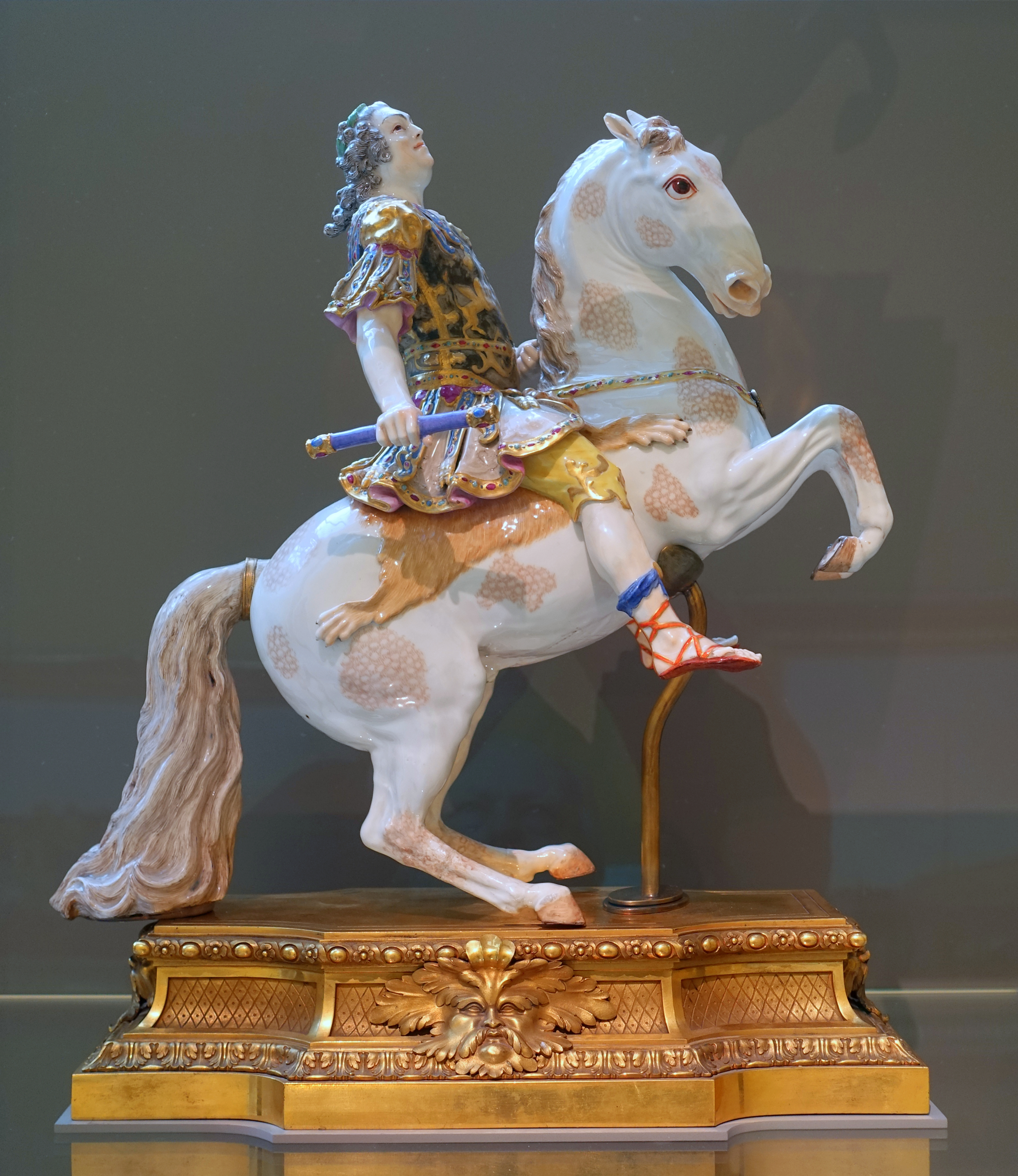
Meissen porcelain figure of King Augustus III

Augustus III was a great patron of the arts and architecture. During his reign, the Baroque Catholic Church of the Royal Court in Dresden (present-day Dresden Cathedral) was built, in which he was later buried as one of the few Polish kings buried outside the Wawel Cathedral in Kraków. He greatly expanded the Dresden art gallery, to the extent that in 1747 it was placed in a new location at the present-day Johanneum, where it remained until 1855 when it was moved to the newly built Semper Gallery. In 1748, he founded the Opera House (Operalnia) in Warsaw and the Collegium medico-chirurgicum, the first medical school in Dresden. During his reign, the extension of the Saxon Palace in Warsaw, begun by his father Augustus II, was completed, and the reconstruction of the eastern façade of the Royal Castle was ordered, thus creating the so-called Saxon Façade, an iconic part of the Vistula panorama of the Warsaw Old Town.

In 1733, the composer Johann Sebastian Bach dedicated the Kyrie–Gloria Mass in B minor, BWV 232 I (early version), to Augustus in honor of his succession to the Saxon electorate, with the hope of appointment as Court Composer, a title Bach received three years later. Bach's title of Koeniglicher Pohlnischer Hoff Compositeur (Royal Polish Court Composer, and court composer to the Elector of Saxony) is engraved on the title page of Bach's famous Goldberg Variations. Augustus III was also the patron of composer Johann Adolph Hasse, who was granted the title of the Royal-Polish and Electoral-Saxon Kapellmeister by his father, Augustus II, in 1731, and thanks to Augustus III the same title was obtained in 1716 by composer Johann David Heinichen.

=== Personal life and criticism ===
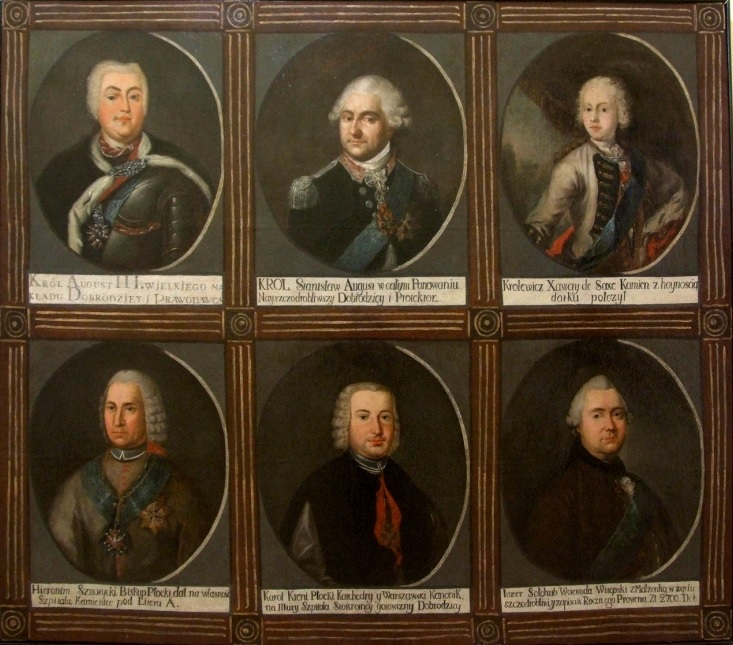
Donors to the General Hospital of Infant Jesus; Augustus III is in the top left corner, 18th century depictions

In 1732, a French priest named Gabriel Piotr Baudouin founded the first orphanage in Poland, situated in Warsaw's Old Town. The facility was later moved to the nearby Warecki Square (now Warsaw Insurgents Square), and in 1758 Augustus III decreed that the new institution be called Szpital Generalny Dzieciątka Jezus (The General Hospital of Infant Jesus). The newly established hospital expanded its operations into treating not only orphans but also the sick and the poor. Augustus remained a charitable man throughout his life and donated to the hospital. His successor, Stanisław Augustus, also contributed to the cause.

Despite his charitable manner, Augustus was viewed in Poland as an impotent monarch, obese, plump, ugly and lazy sybarite with no interest in the affairs of the state. Such harsh critique and opinion continues to this day. On the other hand, historian Jacek Staszewski was able to find a description of Augustus' character in the Dresden archives in the late 1980s; he was considered an honest and affectionate man, who was widely respected during his reign by both the Saxons and the Poles. In his personal life, Augustus was a devoted husband to Maria Josepha, with whom he had sixteen children. Unlike his father, who was a notorious womaniser, he was never unfaithful and enjoyed spending time with his wife, uncommon among the royalty in those days. He also favoured hunting.

== Depictions ==
Augustus III was portrayed by Ernst Dernburg in the 1941 film Friedemann Bach.

== Issue ==
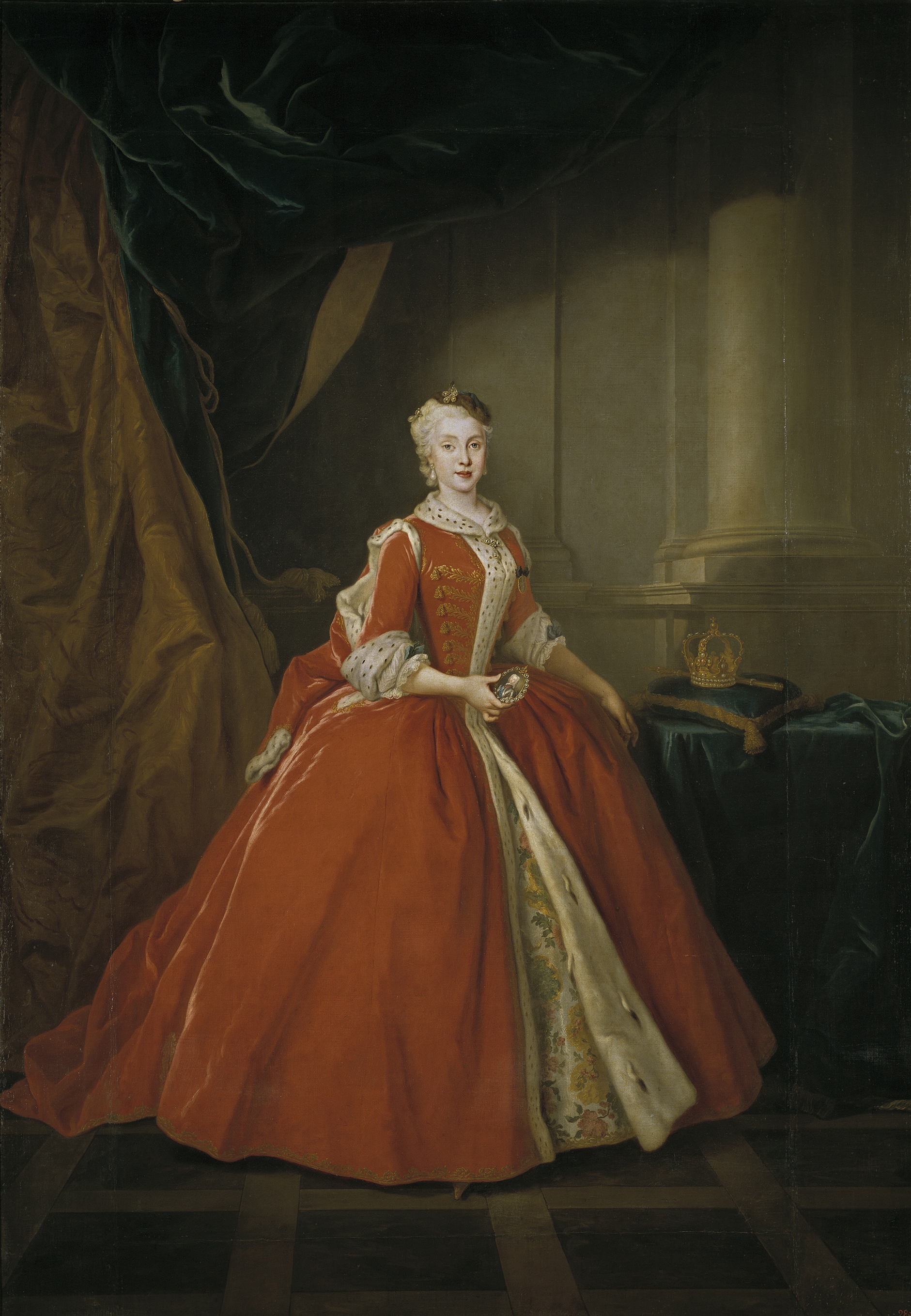
Maria Amalia, Queen of Spain, Naples and Sicily, pictured in Polish dress (1738).

On 20 August 1719, Augustus married Maria Josepha of Austria, the eldest child of Joseph I, the Holy Roman Emperor. They had sixteen children, but only fourteen or fifteen are recognised by historians:

- Frederick Augustus Franz Xavier (18 November 1720, Dresden – 22 January 1721, Dresden) died in infancy;
- Joseph Augustus Wilhelm Frederick Franz Xavier Johann Nepomuk (24 October 1721, Pillnitz – 14 March 1728, Dresden) died in childhood;
- Frederick Christian, Elector of Saxony (5 September 1722, Dresden – 17 December 1763, Dresden), successor to his father as Elector of Saxony;
- Unknown stillborn daughter (23 June 1723, Dresden);
- Maria Amalia of Saxony (24 November 1724, Dresden – 27 September 1760, Buen Retiro); married on 19 June 1738 to Charles VII, King of Naples, later King Charles III of Spain;
- Maria Margaretha Franziska Xaveria (13 September 1727, Dresden – 1 February 1734, Dresden), died in childhood;
- Maria Anna Sophia of Saxony (29 August 1728, Dresden – 17 February 1797, Munich); married on 9 August 1747 to Maximilian III Joseph, Elector of Bavaria;
- Unknown child (1729–1730);
- Prince Francis Xavier of Saxony (25 August 1730, Dresden – 21 June 1806, Dresden), Regent of Saxony (1763–1768);
- Maria Josepha of Saxony, Dauphine of France (4 November 1731, Dresden – 13 March 1767, Versailles); married on 9 February 1747 to Louis, Dauphin of France (born 1729), son of King Louis XV (she was the mother of Kings Louis XVI, Louis XVIII and Charles X of France);
- Carl Christian Joseph of Saxony, Duke of Courland (13 July 1733, Dresden – 16 June 1796, Dresden), Duke of Courland and Zemgale (1758–1763);
- Princess Maria Christina of Saxony (1735–1782) (12 February 1735, Warsaw – 19 November 1782, Brumath), Princess-Abbess of Remiremont;
- Maria Elisabeth of Saxony (1736–1818) (9 February 1736, Warsaw – 24 December 1818, Dresden), died unmarried;
- Albert Kasimir August Ignaz Pius Franz Xavier (11 July 1738, born Moritzburg, near Dresden – 10 February 1822, Vienna), Duke of Teschen and Governor of the Austrian Netherlands (1781–1793);
- Clemens Wenceslaus of Saxony (28 September 1739, Schloss Hubertusburg, Wermsdorf – 27 July 1812, died Marktoberdorf, Allgäu), Archbishop of Trier;
- Maria Kunigunde of Saxony (10 November 1740, Warsaw – 8 April 1826, Dresden), Princess-Abbess of Thorn and Essen.

== Royal titles ==
Royal titles in Latin: Augustus tertius, Dei gratia rex Poloniae, magnus dux Lithuaniæ, Russiæ, Prussiæ, Masoviæ, Samogitiæ, Kijoviæ, Volhiniæ, Podoliæ, Podlachiæ, Livoniæ, Smolensciæ, Severiæ, Czerniechoviæque, nec non-hæreditarius dux Saxoniæ et princeps elector etc.

English translation: August III, by the grace of God, King of Poland, Grand Duke of Lithuania, Ruthenia, Prussia, Masovia, Samogitia, Kiev, Volhynia, Podolia, Podlachia, Livonia, Smolensk, Severia, Chernihiv, and also hereditary Duke of Saxony and Prince-Elector, etc.

== Gallery ==
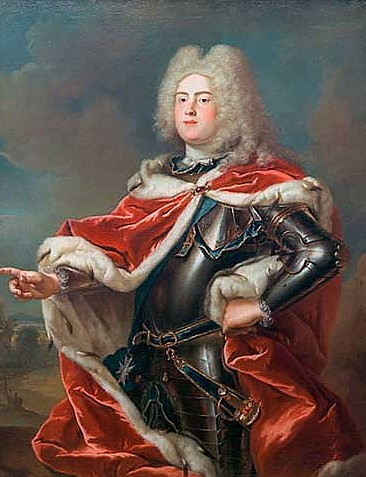
Portrait of Crown Prince Augustus

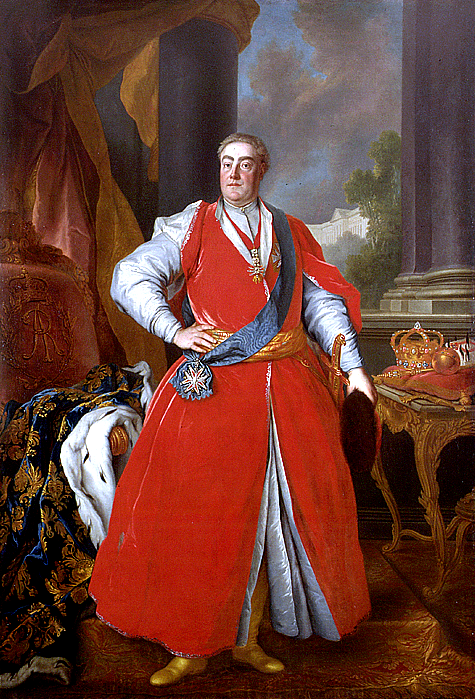
Augustus III in Sarmatian costume, by Louis de Silvestre, c.1737

Coat of arms of Augustus III of Poland as vicar of the Holy Roman Empire

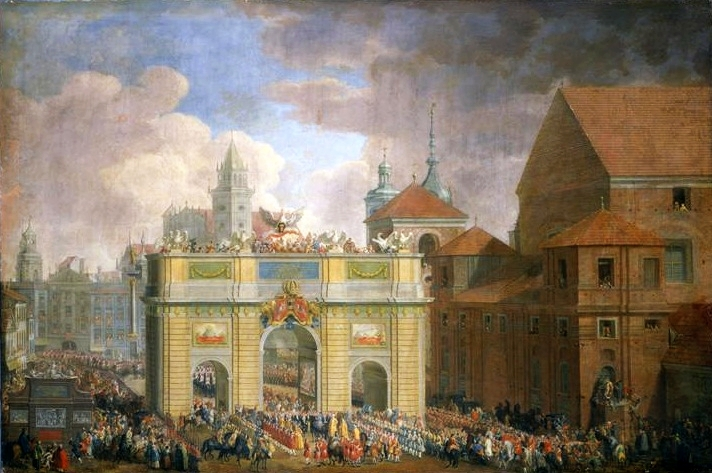
Entry of Augustus III into Warsaw by Johann Samuel Mock

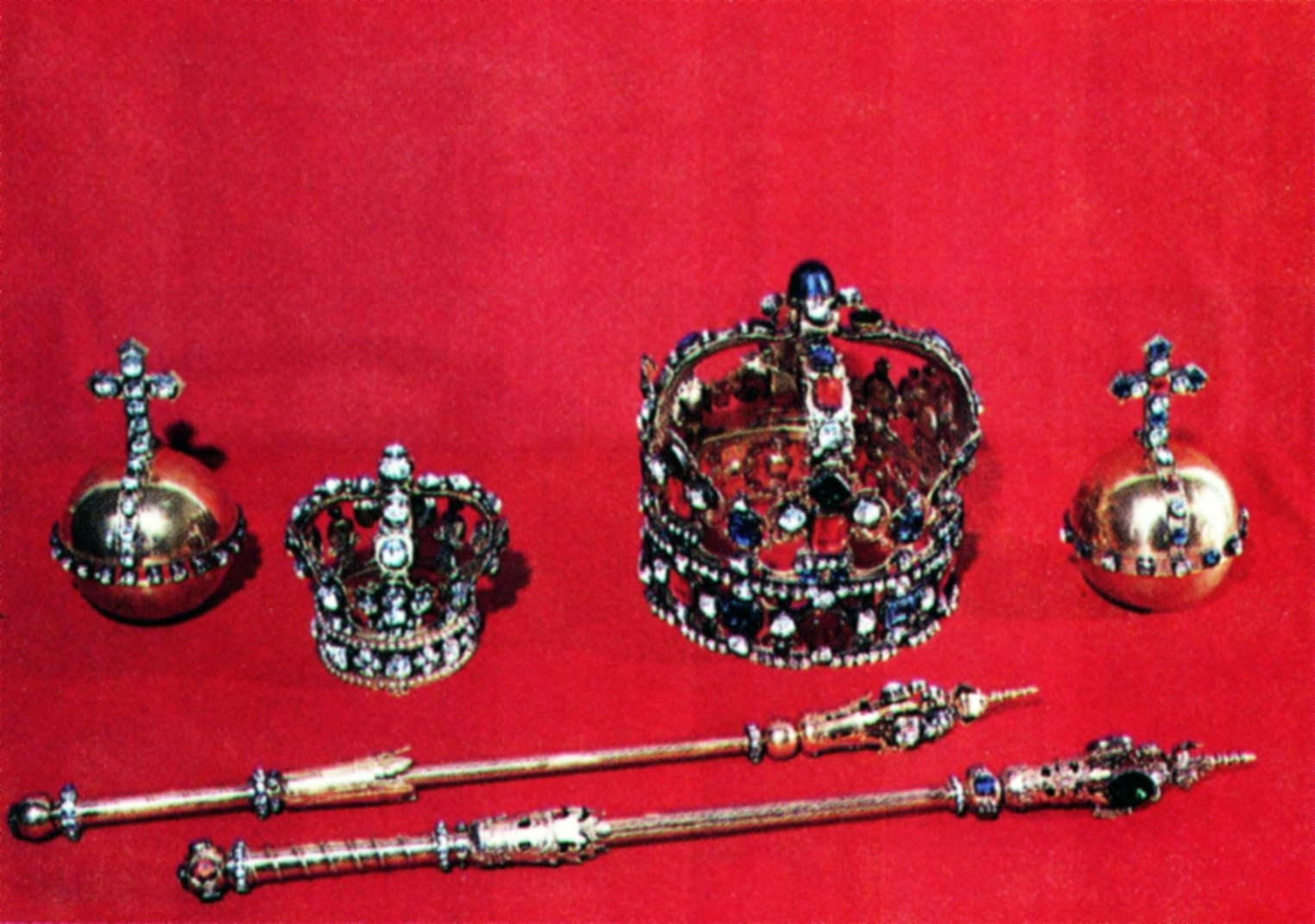
Crown Regalia of King Augustus and Maria Josepha

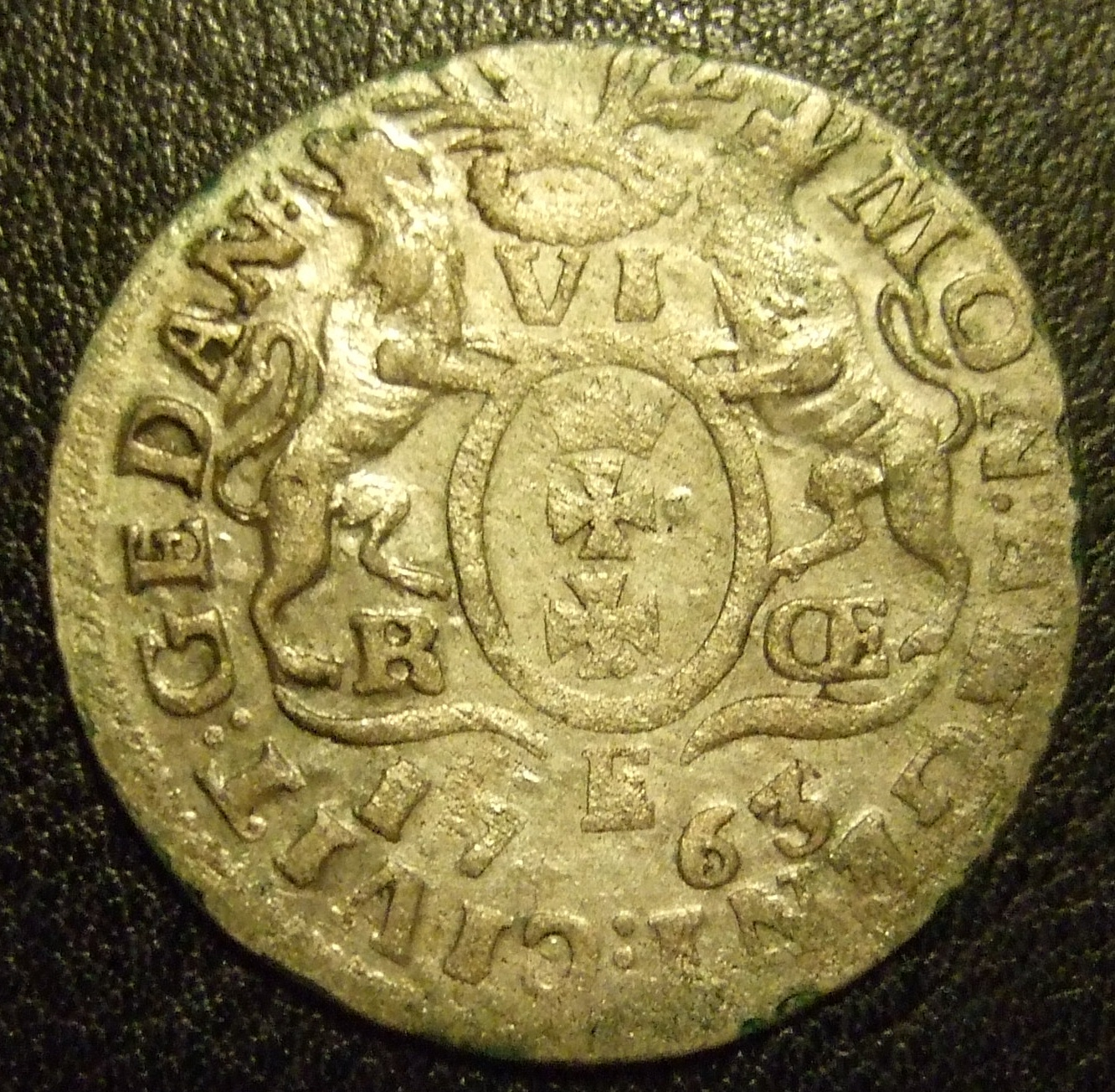
6 groschen, 1763

== See also ==
- History of Saxony
- History of Poland (1569–1795)
- Rulers of Saxony
- List of Lithuanian rulers
- Dresden Castle – Residence of Augustus III

== Bibliography ==
- Groß, Reiner (2007). Die Wettiner. Stuttgart: Kohlhammer Verlag.
- Whaley, Joachim (2012). Germany and the Holy Roman Empire, II: From the Peace of Westphalia to the Dissolution of the Reich 1648-1806. Vol. 2. New York: Oxford University Press.
- Wilson, Peter H. (2016). Heart of Europe: A History of the Holy Roman Empire. Cambridge: Harvard University Press.

Augustus III of Poland (Frederick Augustus II of Saxony) House of Wettin Born: 17 October 1696 Died: 5 October 1763
Regnal titles
Preceded by Stanisław Leszczyński	King of Poland; 1733 – 1763	Succeeded by Stanisław August Poniatowski
Preceded by Frederick Augustus I	Elector of Saxony; 1733 – 1763	Succeeded by Frederick Christian
