= Christiane Eberhardine of Brandenburg-Bayreuth =

Queen of Poland (1697–1706; 1709–1727)

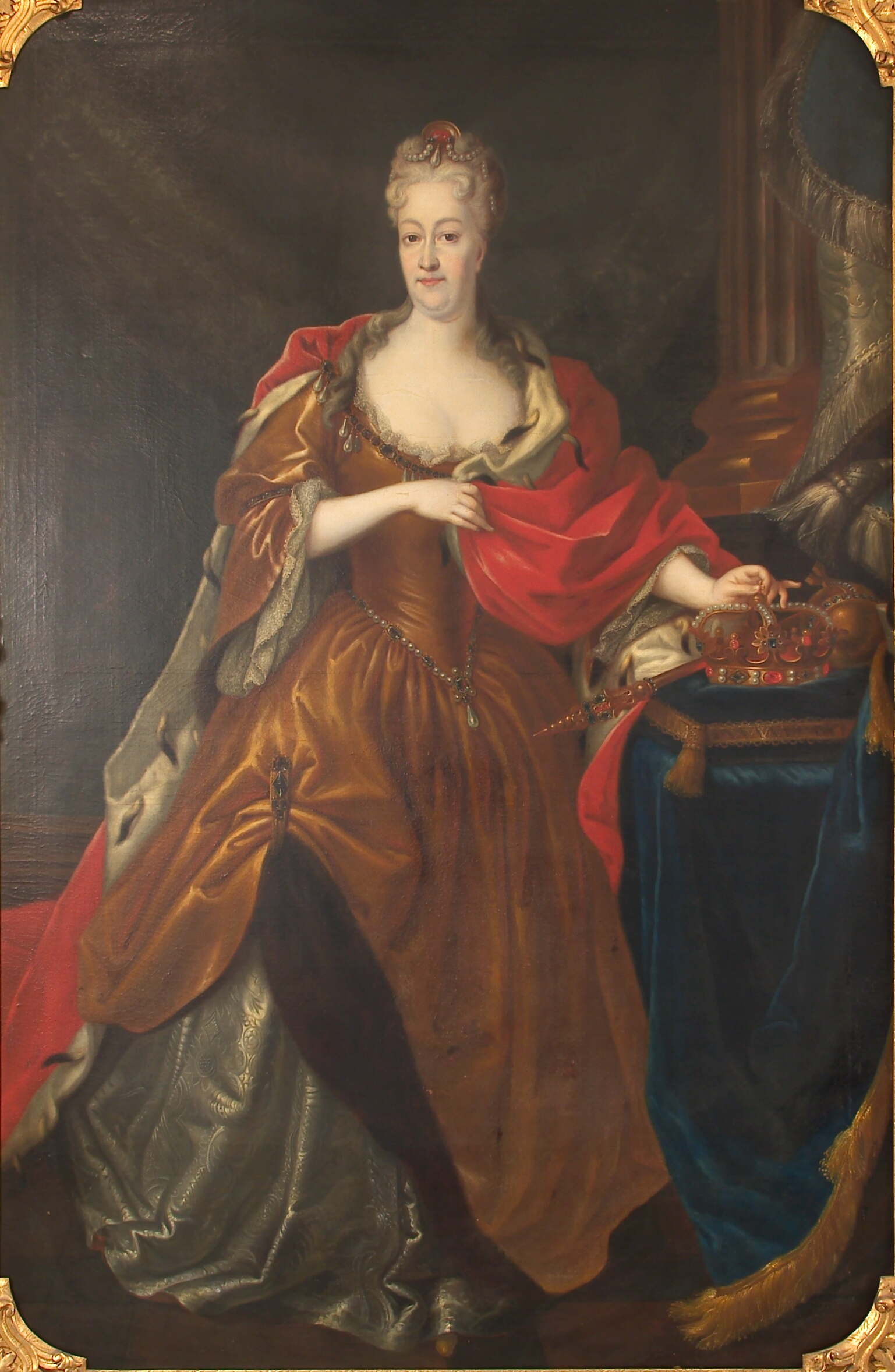

Queen consort of Poland Grand Duchess consort of Lithuania
- Tenure: 15 September 1697 – 1 September 1706
- Tenure: 9 October 1709 – 4 September 1727

Electress consort of Saxony
- Tenure: 27 April 1694 – 4 September 1727
- Born: 19 December 1671; Bayreuth
- Died: 4 September 1727 (aged 55); Pretzsch an der Elbe
- Burial: St. Nicholas Evangelical Church, Pretzsch an der Elbe
- Spouse: Augustus II of Poland (m. 1693)
- Issue: Augustus III of Poland
- House: Hohenzollern
- Father: Christian Ernst, Margrave of Brandenburg-Bayreuth
- Mother: Sophie Luise of Württemberg

Christiane Eberhardine of Brandenburg-Bayreuth (19 December 1671 – 4 September 1727) was Electress of Saxony from 1694 to 1727 (her death), Queen Consort and Grand Duchess Consort of the Polish–Lithuanian Commonwealth from 1697 to 1727 by marriage to Augustus II the Strong. Not once throughout the whole of her thirty-year queenship did she set foot in Poland-Lithuania, instead living in Saxony in self-imposed exile. Born a German margravine, she was called Sachsens Betsäule, "Saxony's pillar of prayer", by her Protestant subjects for her refusal to convert to Catholicism. Despite the allegiance of Christiane Eberhardine and her mother-in-law, Anna Sophie of Denmark, to Lutheranism, her husband and son, later Augustus III, both became Catholics, ensuring Catholic succession in the Albertine lands after a century and a half.

== Biography ==
=== Early life ===
She was the firstborn child of Christian Ernst, Margrave of Brandenburg-Bayreuth, and his second wife, Princess Sophie Luise of Württemberg, daughter of Eberhard III, Duke of Württemberg. She was named for her father, Christian, and her mother's father, Eberhard. As the daughter of the Margrave of Brandenburg-Bayreuth, she was margravine by birth. She had five younger siblings, only two of whom survived infancy. She remained close to her relatives in Bayreuth and continued to visit them after her marriage.

=== Marriage and issues ===
She married Frederick Augustus, Duke of Saxony, the younger brother of the elector, John George IV, on 20 January 1693 at age 21. The marriage was purely political and deeply unhappy. Augustus considered her boring, while she was shocked and hurt by his constant infidelity.

Three years later, on 17 October 1696, their son Frederick Augustus was born in Dresden. This was the only pregnancy in their entire 34-year-long marriage. He was brought up by his paternal grandmother, Anna Sophie of Denmark. Because Christiane Eberhardine and her mother-in-law got on well, she visited her son frequently.

Christiane Eberhardine's husband converted to Catholicism to become king of Poland and grand duke of Lithuania, but she remained faithful to her Protestant beliefs and was not present at her husband's coronation, and was never crowned queen of Poland and grand duchess of Lithuania. Her Protestant countrymen named her "The Pillar of Saxony."

=== Queen, Grand Duchess and Electress ===
Christiane Eberhardine became electress when Augustus succeeded his brother as elector in 1694. In the carnival procession with which Augustus celebrated his elevation, and where the members of his court drove through Dresden dressed as gods and goddesses, the mistress of her husband, Maria Aurora von Königsmarck, participated in the procession, driving the wagon of Apollo dressed as the goddess Aurora, while she participated in a minor role as one of the Vestal Virgins escorting the goddess Vesta. In 1696, Christiane Eberhardine gave birth to her only child, the heir to the throne, after the only pregnancy during her entire marriage.

In 1697, Augustus converted to Catholicism and was elected King of Poland and Grand Duke of Lithuania. Apparently, he had discussed neither his conversion nor his candidacy with her. His conversion caused a scandal in Saxony, and he was forced to guarantee the religious freedom of Saxony. According to the contemporary norms, Christiane Eberhardine, now queen and grand duchess, was expected to follow him to the Polish-Lithuanian Commonwealth and support him by hosting his court as queen and grand duchess by his side and be crowned with him in Kraków, and from the summer of 1697 until the coronation on 15 September 1697, Augustus tried to negotiate for her to come. However, Christiane Eberhardine refused to attend the coronation and to set foot in the Polish-Lithuanian Commonwealth even though her father also united with Augustus in persuading her. According to the Pacta Conventa, which Augustus had signed after his election, he was obliged to persuade her to convert, which she refused. In March 1698, Augustus invited her to come to Danzig, where there was a large Protestant minority and where her father was to meet her. He promised her the freedom to remain a Protestant, bring with her a Protestant clergyman and practice her own faith, as long as the clergyman did not appear in public dressed in office and she did not visit Protestant churches in public. Augustus further guaranteed that their son would not convert by entrusting him to the care of his Protestant mother, Dowager Electress Anna Sophie. Christiane Eberhardine did not agree with the terms and refused to follow her father to Danzig and therefrom to Warsaw. In April 1698, her spouse and father signed a document in Warsaw, promising freedom of religion for her in Danzig and Thorn, though not publicly. Her father then returned with the document to Dresden and tried to convince her to come to Poland-Lithuania. Despite repeated attempts and demands from her husband and father, Christiane Eberhardine refused to go to Poland-Lithuania, and she never did during the entire reign of Augustus, nor was she ever crowned queen.

During his reign, Augustus travelled between the Polish-Lithuanian Commonwealth and Saxony, and during his visits to Saxony, Christiane Eberhardine appeared at his side at official functions, such as when he returned to Saxony after his election in Dresden in August 1699, when they appeared at the theater. Often, however, they did not meet for years at a time, such as for example in 1700–1703 and 1714–1717, when he spent all his time in Poland-Lithuania. Augustus visited her at Pretzsch every year he travelled to Dresden.

Queen Christiane Eberhardine lived separated from her spouse with her own court in Hartenfels Castle in Torgau in winters and in her castle at Pretzsch an der Elbe in the summers, which was close to the residence of her mother-in-law, who also had the custody of her son, whom she often visited, as she and her mother-in-law were on friendly terms. She made trips to her relatives in Bayreuth and the spa at Ems and regularly visited Dresden during the carnival season and Christmas. Christiane Eberhardine continued to participate in representational court life in Dresden whenever her presence was required, the biggest festivities being the state visit of the King of Denmark in 1709 and the wedding of her son in 1719.

In her voluntary exile she concentrated on cultural activities and took interest in the faith of orphaned children. At her court, she took many relatives as courtiers to educate them, among them Charlotte of Braunschweig, who married the Russian heir to the throne, Sophie Magdalene who married the Crown Prince of Denmark and Sophie Caroline who married the Prince of Ostfriesland. She was also active in the field of economics; in 1697 she took over operation of the glass factory in Pretzsch, founded by Constantin Fremel. She enjoyed playing cards and billiards, which is noted to have amassed great debts by 1711. She founded an orangery and during the last year of her life she was in the midst of planning a Protestant convent for female nobles.

Queen-Grand Duchess Christiane Eberhardine, as did her mother-in-law, enjoyed immense popularity in Saxony as a symbol of Protestant faith and protection against Catholic Poland-Lithuania, which the Protestants feared would enforce a counter-reformation. In this role, Protestant preachers liked to portray her as a miserable Protestant martyr, isolated as a virtual prisoner in her lonely castle, a portrait even more accentuated after her son had been taken from Saxony and converted to Catholicism.

Christiane Eberhardine of Brandenburg-Bayreuth died at the age of 55 and was buried on 6 September in the parish church of Pretzsch. Neither her husband nor her son were present at the funeral. In commemoration of her death, Johann Sebastian Bach composed the cantata Laß, Fürstin, laß noch einen Strahl, BWV 198, to a text of Johann Christoph Gottsched, first performed on 15 October 1727 in the Paulinerkirche, the church of the University of Leipzig.

== Sources ==
- Watanabe-O'Kelly, Helen. "Enlightenment, Emancipation, and the Queen Consort." Enlightenment and Emancipation. Ed. Susan Manning and Peter France. Lewisburg, Pa.: Bucknell UP, 2006. 119–25. Print.

Christiane Eberhardine of Brandenburg-Bayreuth House of Hohenzollern
Royal titles
Preceded by Marie Casimire Louise de la Grange d'Arquien	Queen consort of Poland; Grand Duchess consort of Lithuania; 1697–1706	Succeeded by Katarzyna Opalińska
Preceded by Katarzyna Opalińska	Queen consort of Poland; Grand Duchess consort of Lithuania; 1709–1727	Succeeded by Katarzyna Opalińska
Preceded by Eleonore Erdmuthe of Saxe-Eisenach	Electress consort of Saxony; 1694–1727	Succeeded by Maria Josepha of Austria
