= Princess Maria Ferdinanda of Saxony =

Grand Duchess of Tuscany from 1821 to 1824

Maria Ferdinanda of Saxony
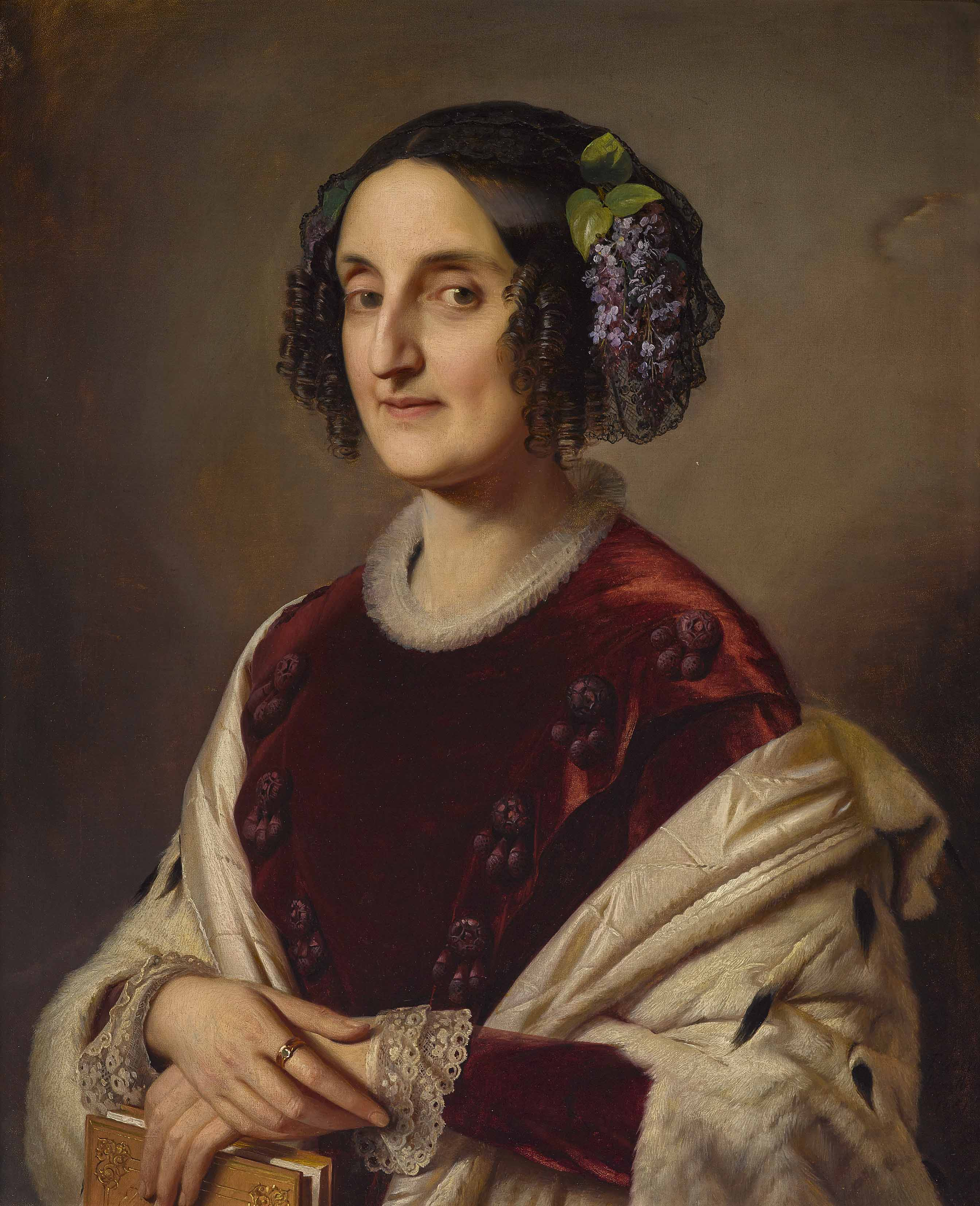
- Portrait, 1851

Grand Duchess consort of Tuscany
- Tenure: 6 May 1821 – 18 June 1824
- Born: 27 April 1796; Dresden
- Died: 3 January 1865 (aged 68); Brandýs nad Labem-Stará Boleslav
- Burial: Imperial Crypt
- Spouse: Ferdinand III, Grand Duke of Tuscany (m. 1821; died 1824)
Names
- German: Maria Ferdinanda Amalia Xaveria Theresia Josepha Anna Nepomucena Aloysia Johanna Vincentia Ignatia Dominica Franziska de Paula Franziska de Chantal; Italian: Maria Ferdinanda Amalia Saveria Teresa Giuseppa Anna Nepomucena Luisa Giovanna Vincenza Ignazia Domenica Francesca di Paola Francesca di Chantal
- House: Wettin
- Father: Maximilian, Crown Prince of Saxony
- Mother: Princess Carolina of Parma

Princess Maria Ferdinanda of Saxony (27 April 1796 – 3 January 1865) was a daughter of Maximilian, Crown Prince of Saxony and his first wife Princess Carolina of Parma. She was by marriage Grand Duchess of Tuscany from 1821 to 1824.

== Early life and family ==
Maria Ferdinanda was born to Maximilian, Crown Prince of Saxony and his first wife Princess Caroline of Parma on 27 April 1796. She was their second eldest daughter. As her mother died in 1804, her father remarried in 1825 to Princess Maria Luisa Carlota of Parma, but this marriage would produce no new siblings. Her father died in 1838, having renounced his rights to the succession of Saxony in favor of his eldest son.

Maria Ferdinanda had seven siblings, most of whom married well. Her older sister was Princess Amalie, a notable composer. Her next younger brother would become Frederick Augustus II of Saxony in 1836. Her next brother was Prince Klemens, who would die at the age of 24. Her next three siblings (Maria Anna, John, and Maria Josepha Amalia) would become by birth or marriage Grand Duchess of Tuscany, King of Saxony, and Queen of Spain respectively.

In 1817, Maria Ferdinanda accompanied her younger sister Princess Maria Anna of Saxony to Florence, where she was going to marry the future Leopold II, Grand Duke of Tuscany. The two were very close, so that Maria Anna was too scared to go without Maria Ferdinanda's company. The couple duly married. Something decidedly unexpected occurred however. Maria Ferdinanda caught the eye of Leopold's elderly father Ferdinand III, Grand Duke of Tuscany.

== Marriage ==
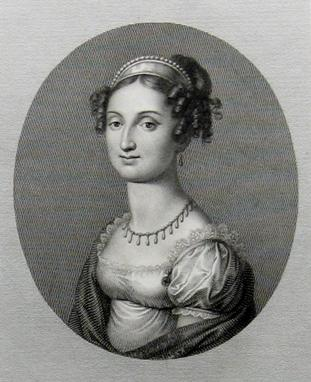
Maria Ferdinanda in 1822, the year after her marriage

On 6 May 1821, Maria Ferdinanda was married to Ferdinand III, Grand Duke of Tuscany in Florence. She was his second wife, and he was twenty-seven years older. She was his first cousin once removed as well as a first cousin once removed of his first wife Princess Luisa of Naples. Ferdinand may have desired this second marriage because the succession was in doubt: though his only son had recently married Maria Ferdinanda’s sister Maria Anna, he was considered sickly. No children were born of this marriage.

As Maria Ferdinanda's younger sister Princess Maria Anna of Saxony was married to Ferdinand's son Leopold, Maria Ferdinanda thus became her own sister's step-mother-in-law.

Ferdinand died in 1824 in Florence, causing his son Leopold, and Leopold's wife Maria Anna, to succeed as Grand Duke and Grand Duchess of Tuscany.

== Later life ==
In 1859, the Tuscan royal family lost their claims to the throne during the Italian Unification. The royal family left the Palazzo Pitti in Florence for the Austrian court of Emperor Francis Joseph and Empress Elisabeth in Vienna. Maria Ferdinanda lived mainly from then on in Schlackenwerth, but was often a guest of her brother King John of Saxony in Dresden. She had an especially close relationship with her sister Amalie. Maria Ferdinanda was a bearer of the royal Order of the Noble Ladies of Maria Luisa, an order founded by Queen Maria Louisa of Spain.

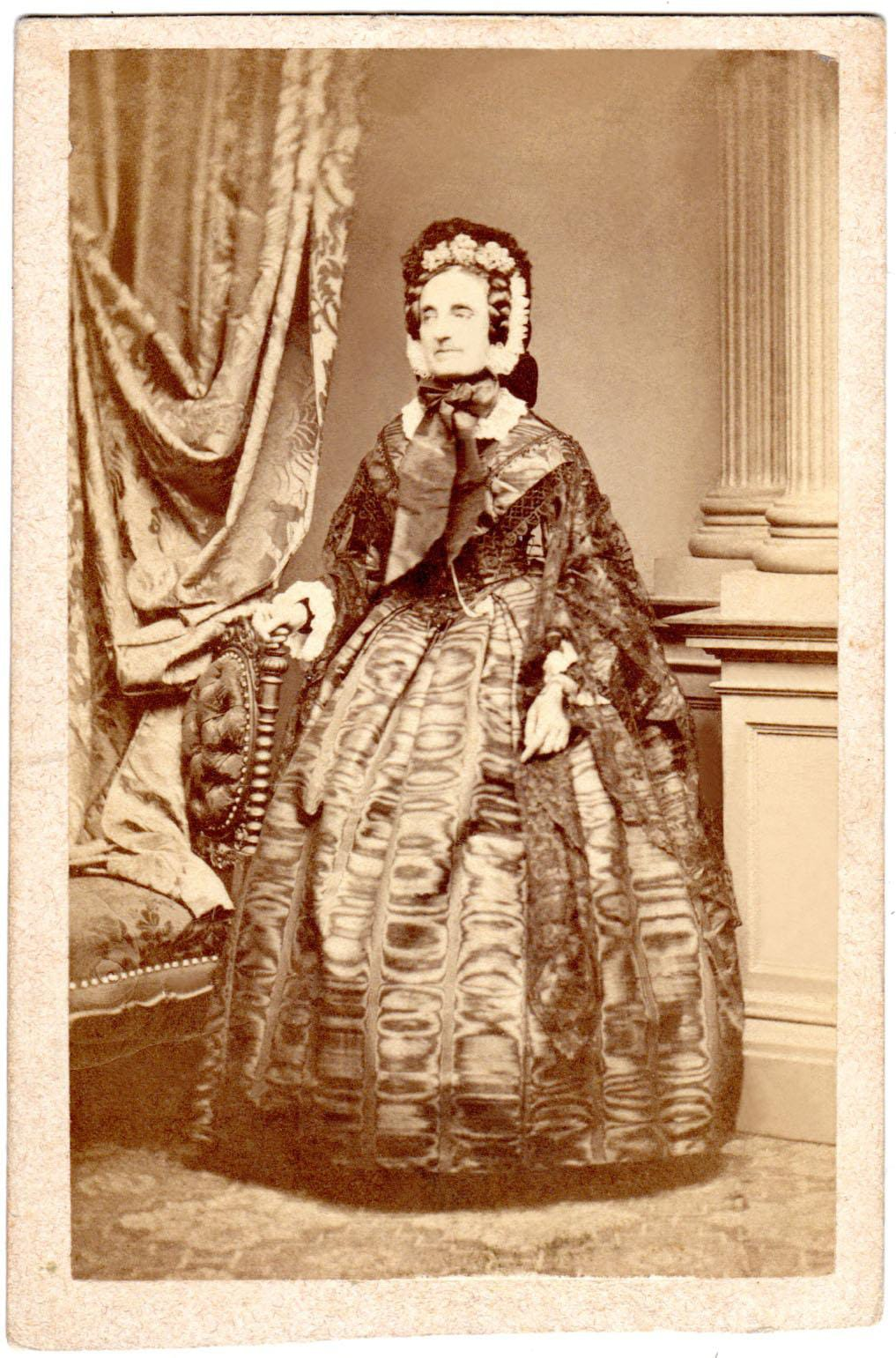
Photograph of Maria Ferdinanda, 1862

Maria Ferdinanda remained a widow for forty-one years. She died of natural causes on 3 January 1865 at the age of 68. She was buried in the Imperial Crypt, Vienna.

== Ancestry ==
Ancestors of Princess Maria Ferdinanda of Saxony

8. Augustus III of Poland
4. Frederick Christian, Elector of Saxony
9. Maria Josepha of Austria
2. Maximilian, Hereditary Prince of Saxony
10. Charles VII, Holy Roman Emperor
5. Maria Antonia of Bavaria
11. Maria Amalia of Austria
1. Princess Maria Ferdinanda of Saxony
12. Philip, Duke of Parma
6. Ferdinand, Duke of Parma
13. Louise Élisabeth of France
3. Carolina of Parma
14. Francis I, Holy Roman Emperor
7. Maria Amalia of Austria
15. Maria Theresa of Austria

== Sources ==
- Toscana, Luise von (1911). My Own Story. London: Ballantyne & Company LTD. "My own story Toscana."

Princess Maria Ferdinanda of Saxony House of Wettin Born: 27 April 1796 Died: 3 January 1865
Italian royalty
Vacant Title last held by Luisa of Naples and Sicily	Grand Duchess consort of Tuscany; 1821–1824	Succeeded by Maria Anna of Saxony
