= Prince Clemens of Saxony =

Prince of Saxony

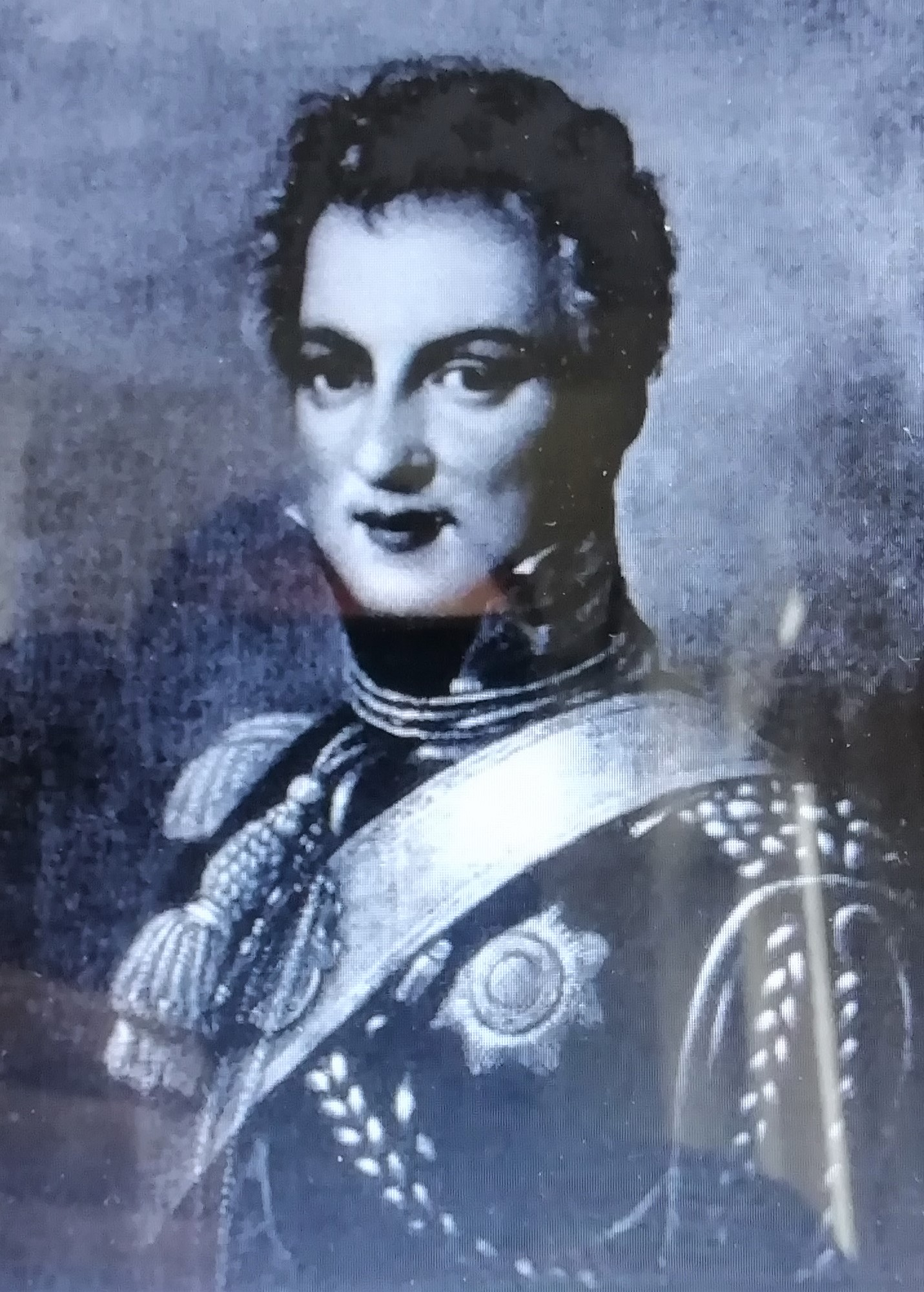
- Born: 1 May 1798; Dresden
- Died: 4 January 1822 (aged 23); Pisa
Names
- Clemens Maria Joseph Nepomuk Aloys Vincenz Xaver Franz de Paula Franz de Valois Joachim Benno Philipp Jakob
- House: Wettin
- Father: Prince Maximilian of Saxony
- Mother: Princess Carolina of Parma

Clemens of Saxony (Clemens Maria Joseph Nepomuk Aloys Vincenz Xaver Franz de Paula Franz de Valois Joachim Benno Philipp Jakob; 1 May 1798 – 4 January 1822) was a Prince of Saxony. He was the second son of Prince Maximilian of Saxony (1759–1838) and his first wife, Princess Carolina of Parma (1770–1804), daughter of Ferdinand, Duke of Parma. He was a member of the house of Wettin.

== Biography ==
Clemens was born in Dresden, one of the seven children of Maximilian of Saxony by his first wife Princess Carolina of Parma. His father was a son of Frederick Christian, Elector of Saxony, while his mother was a daughter of Ferdinand, Duke of Parma. Through his mother, Clemens was also a direct descendant of King Louis XV of France and Empress Maria Theresa of Austria. He was raised alongside his two brothers, the future kings Frederick Augustus II and Johann I. Clemens was a young boy during the time of the Napoleonic Wars and had to flee from his home several times; he and his family were forced to sleep on straw wherever they could find shelter.

In 1815, Clemens visited the Austrian headquarters accompanied by his older brother. Archduke Ferdinand of Austria-Este gave them the warmest welcome. After visiting Paris and the capitals of southern Germany, Clemens and Frederick Augustus returned to Dresden in October, where they continued their studies with their younger brother Johann. During a trip to Italy with his brothers, Clemens contracted a fever and died in Pisa on January 4, 1822.

Throughout his life, he was third in the line of succession of the then Electorate of Saxony, later the Kingdom of Saxony. Had he lived longer, he would have become King, since both his uncles Frederick Augustus I and Anthony had no surviving children, while his older brother Frederick Augustus II would also not have legitimate offspring from his two marriages. His younger brother, Johann, succeeded their childless brother in 1854.

== Ancestry ==
Ancestors of Prince Clemens of Saxony

8. Augustus III of Poland
4. Frederick Christian, Elector of Saxony
9. Maria Josepha of Austria
2. Maximilian, Hereditary Prince of Saxony
10. Charles VII, Holy Roman Emperor
5. Maria Antonia of Bavaria
11. Maria Amalia of Austria
1. Prince Clemens of Saxony
12. Philip, Duke of Parma
6. Ferdinand, Duke of Parma
13. Louise-Élisabeth of France
3. Carolina of Parma
14. Francis I, Holy Roman Emperor
7. Maria Amalia of Austria
15. Maria Theresa of Austria
