= Princess Amalie of Saxony =

German composer and writer

Princess Amalia Augusta
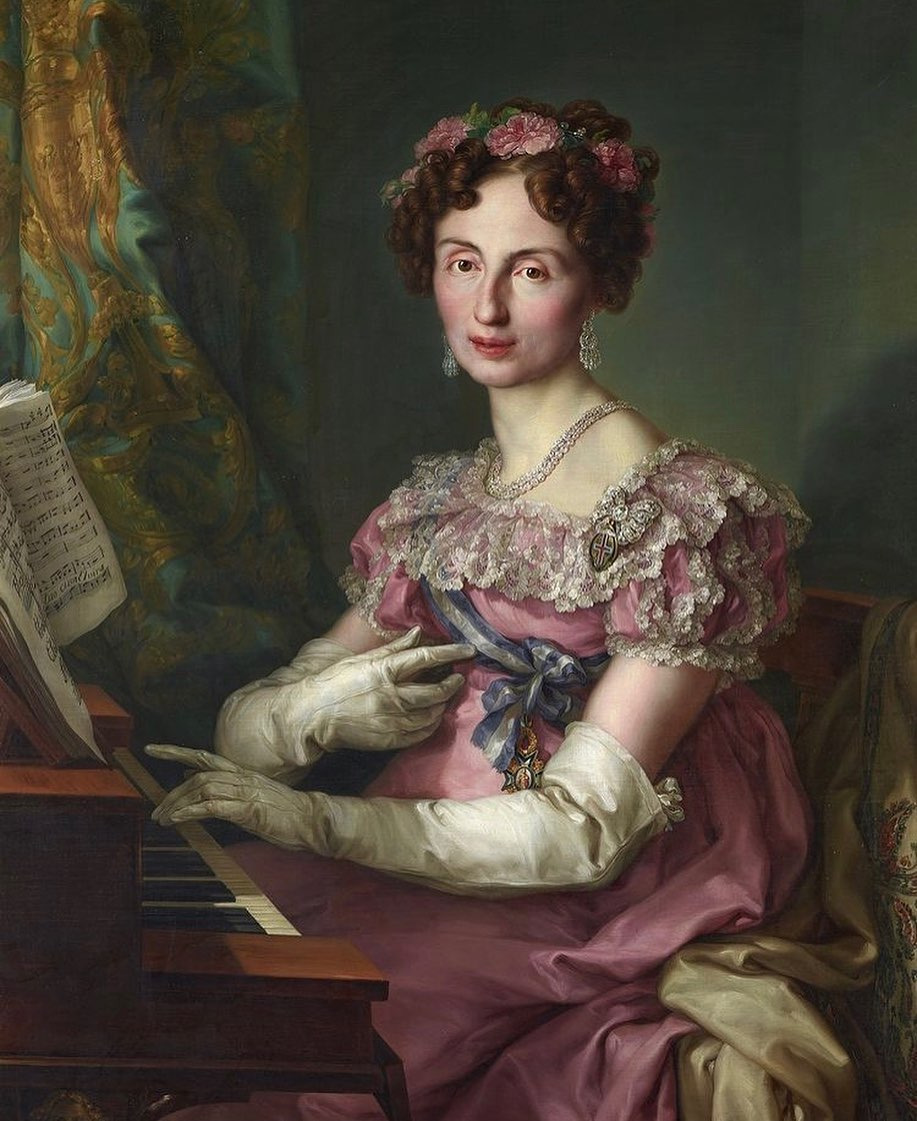
- Maria Amalie in 1825, portrait by Vicente López Portaña.
- Born: 10 August 1794; Pillnitz, Dresden
- Died: 18 September 1870 (aged 76); Pillnitz, Dresden
- Burial: Katholische Hofkirche
Names
- German: Maria Amalia Friederike Augusta Karolina Ludovica Josepha Aloysia Anna Nepomucena Philippina Vincentia Franziska de Paula Franziska de Chantal
- House: Wettin
- Father: Prince Maximilian of Saxony
- Mother: Princess Carolina of Parma

Maria Amalia Augusta (10 August 1794 – 18 September 1870), Princess of Saxony, full name Maria Amalia Friederike Augusta Karolina Ludovica Josepha Aloysia Anna Nepomucena Philippina Vincentia Franziska de Paula Franziska de Chantal, was a German composer writing under the pen name A. Serena, and a dramatist under the name Amalie Heiter. She was the daughter of Prince Maximilian of Saxony and Princess Carolina of Parma.

== Life ==
Princess Amalie was the eldest child of Prince Maximilian of Saxony and Princess Carolina of Parma. She was named after her maternal grandmother, Maria Amalia, Duchess of Parma. She was also the granddaughter of Frederick Christian, Elector of Saxony; niece of Frederick Augustus I, King of Saxony and Anthony, King of Saxony; sister of Frederick Augustus II, King of Saxony and John, King of Saxony; and aunt of Albert, King of Saxony and George, King of Saxony.

She spent most of her life in Pillnitz Castle near Dresden. Known for her education and intellectual interests, she composed chamber, opera, and sacred music, performed as a singer, wrote comedies, and played the harpsichord.

Amalie was a young girl during the time of the Napoleonic Wars and had to flee from her castle several times. She and her family were forced to sleep on straw wherever they could find shelter. She met Napoleon several times and held a negative opinion of him. When Napoleon observed that she was angry with him because he warred against her family, but that she should and would accustom herself to the situation, she firmly replied that there were some things one can't be accustomed to.

== Career ==
=== Music ===
Amalie studied music with Joseph Schuster, Vincenzo Rastrelli, Johann Miksch, Franz Schubert, and Carl Maria von Weber. She began writing music in 1811 and composed numerous operas, popular among the Dresden elite. She published her musical works under the pseudonym A. Serena. Her most popular compositions were her comedic operas. She portrayed her characters with innovation and color. Weber found her "highly talented".

=== Dramatics ===
In 1829/30, she published two dramas under the name of Amalie Heiter. Among her subsequent dramatic works, which were noted for a love of humanity and virtue, her comedies Der Onkel ("The Uncle") and Die Fürstenbraut ("The Prince's bride") became very popular. The latter was performed in Paris under the title Une femme charmante ("A charming woman", 1840). Some of her other plays were also adapted to the French stage. A complete edition of her dramatic works was published in Dresden, for the benefit of the women's association, under the title of Originalbeiträge zur deutschen Schaubühne ("Original contributions to the German stage", 6 vols., 1837–42). A third edition of the first volume appeared in 1858, and a French version of it (Comédies) at Paris in 1841. Six of her dramas were translated into English by Anna Jameson (London, 1846), and six others were translated anonymously (1848).

== Musical works ==
- Una donna (1816)
- Le nozze funeste (1816)
- Le tre cinture (1817)
- Il prigioniere (1820)
- L'americana (1820)
- Elvira (1821)
- Elisa ed Ernesto (1823)
- La fedeltà alla prova (1826)
- Vecchiezza e gioventù (1828)
- Il figlio pentito (1831)
- Il marchesino (1833)
- Die Siegesfahne (operetta, 1834)
- La casa disabitata (1835)

== Ancestry ==
Ancestors of Princess Amalie of Saxony

8. Augustus III of Poland
4. Frederick Christian, Elector of Saxony
9. Maria Josepha of Austria
2. Maximilian, Crown Prince of Saxony
10. Charles VII, Holy Roman Emperor
5. Duchess Maria Antonia of Bavaria
11. Maria Amalia of Austria
1. Princess Amalie of Saxony
12. Philip, Duke of Parma
6. Ferdinand, Duke of Parma
13. Louise-Élisabeth of France
3. Princess Carolina of Parma
14. Francis I, Holy Roman Emperor
7. Archduchess Maria Amalia of Austria
15. Maria Theresa of Austria

== Bibliography ==
=== Modern works ===
- Slonimsky, Nicolas, ed. (2001). Baker's Biographical Dictionary of Musicians. New York: Schrimer Books.
- Women in World History: A Biographical Encyclopedia. Woodbridge, CT: Yorkin. 1999.
- Rieger, Eva, ed. (1995). The Norton/Grove Dictionary of Women Composers. New York: W. W. Norton and Company.

=== Older sources ===
- Henry Gardiner Adams, ed. (1857). "Amelia Maria Frederica Augusta" . A Cyclopaedia of Female Biography: 36–37. Wikidata Q115654216 – via Wikisource.
- Gilman, D. C.; Peck, H. T.; Colby, F. M., eds. (1905). "Amalie, Marie Friederike Auguste" . New International Encyclopedia (1st ed.). New York: Dodd, Mead.
- "The Princess Amalie of Saxony and Napoleon". The New York Times. 13 May 1883. This is an extract from another publication.
