= Albert, King of Saxony =

King of Saxony from 1873 to 1902

Albert
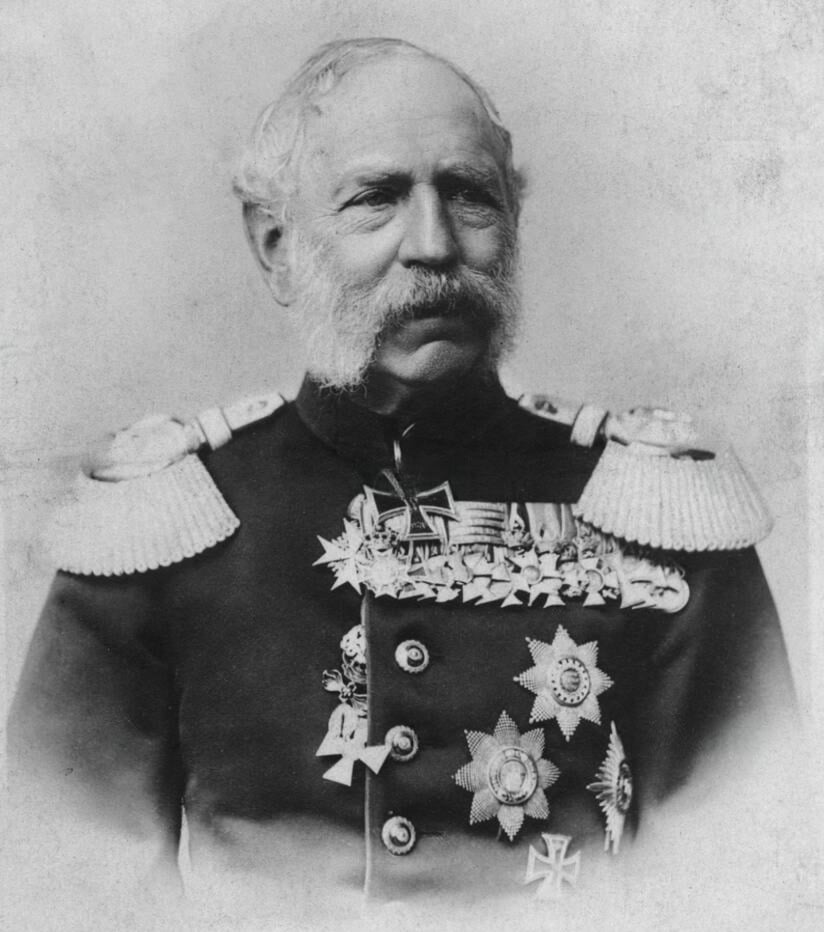
- Albert in 1890

King of Saxony
- Reign: 29 October 1873 – 19 June 1902
- Predecessor: John
- Successor: George
- Born: 23 April 1828; Dresden, Kingdom of Saxony
- Died: 19 June 1902 (aged 74); Sibyllenort, German Empire
- Burial: Katholische Hofkirche
- Spouse: Carola of Vasa (m. 1853)
Names
- German: Friedrich August Albert Anton Ferdinand Joseph Karl Maria Baptist Nepomuk Wilhelm Xaver Georg Fidelis; English: Frederick Augustus Albert Antony Ferdinand Joseph Charles Maria Baptist Nepomuk William Xavier George Fidelis
- House: Wettin (Albertine line)
- Father: John of Saxony
- Mother: Amalie Auguste of Bavaria
- Religion: Roman Catholicism
- Military career
- Branch: Royal Saxon Army; Prussian Army
- Conflicts: Austro-Prussian War; • Battle of Gitschin; Franco-Prussian War; • Battle of Villiers; • Battle of Le Bourget

Albert (23 April 1828 – 19 June 1902) was King of Saxony from 29 October 1873 until his death in 1902.

He was the eldest son of Prince John (who succeeded his brother Frederick Augustus II on the Saxon throne as King John in 1854) by his wife Amalie Auguste of Bavaria.

Albert had a successful military career, leading Saxon troops that participated in the First Schleswig War, the Austro-Prussian War, and the Franco-Prussian War.

== Early life ==
Albert's education, as usual with German princes, concentrated to a great extent on military matters, but he attended lectures at the University of Bonn. His first experience of warfare came in 1849, when he served as a captain in the First War of Schleswig against Denmark.

When the Austro-Prussian War broke out in 1866, Albert, then Crown Prince (German: Kronprinz), took up the command of the Saxon forces opposing the Prussian Army of Prince Friedrich Karl of Prussia. No attempt was made to defend Saxony, and the Saxons fell back into Bohemia and effected a junction with the Austrians. They took a prominent part in the battles by which the Prussians forced the line of the Jizera and in the Battle of Jičín. The Crown Prince, however, succeeded in effecting the retreat in good order, and in the decisive Battle of Königgrätz (3 July 1866), he held the extreme left of the Austrian position. The Saxons maintained their post with great tenacity but were involved in the disastrous defeat of their allies.

During the operations, the Crown Prince won the reputation of a thorough soldier. After peace was made and Saxony had entered the North German Confederation, he gained the command of the Saxon army, which had now become the XII army corps of the North German army, and in that position, he carried out the necessary reorganisation. He proved a firm adherent of the Prussian alliance. On the outbreak of the Franco-Prussian War in 1870, he again commanded the Saxons, who were included in the 2nd army under Prince Friedrich Karl of Prussia, his old opponent. At the Battle of Gravelotte, they formed the extreme left of the German army, and with the Prussian Guard carried out the attack on St Privat, the final and decisive action in the battle.

In the reorganisation of the army which accompanied the march towards Paris, the Crown Prince gained a separate command over the 4th army (Army of the Meuse) consisting of the Saxons, the Prussian Guard corps, and the IV (Prussian Saxony) corps. He was succeeded in command of the XII corps by his brother Prince George, who had served under him in Bohemia.

Albert took a leading part in the operations which preceded the battle of Sedan, the 4th army being the pivot on which the whole army wheeled round in pursuit of MacMahon; and the actions of Buzancy and Beaumont on 29 and 30 August 1870 were fought under his direction. In the Battle of Sedan itself (1 September 1870), with the troops under his orders, Albert carried out the envelopment of the French on the east and the north.

Albert's conduct in the engagements won for him the complete confidence of the army, and during the Siege of Paris, his troops formed the north-east section of the investing force. During the siege, he blocked French attempts to break out of the encirclement at Le Bourget and Villiers. After the conclusion of the Treaty of Frankfurt (1871), he was left in command of the German army of occupation, a position which he held till the fall of the Paris Commune. On the conclusion of peace, he was made an inspector-general of the army and a field marshal.

== King ==
Portrait of King Albert, 1880

On the death of his father, King John on 29 October 1873, the Crown Prince succeeded to the throne as King Albert. His reign proved uneventful, and he took little public part in politics, devoting himself to military affairs, in which his advice and experience were of the greatest value, not only to the Saxon corps but also to the German army in general. During his reign, the Saxon monarchy became constitutional.

In the 1870s, Albert initiated the construction of a Dresden suburb, the Albertstadt. It was then the largest garrison in Germany. Near the former suburb other buildings and places still bear his name: the Albertbrücke, the Alberthafen, the Albertplatz and the Albertinum.

In 1879, he initiated the reconstruction of the Saint Afra School in Meissen. In 1897, he was appointed arbitrator between the claimants for the Principality of Lippe.

== Marriage and succession ==
In Dresden on 18 June 1853, Albert married Princess Carola, daughter of Gustav, Prince of Vasa and granddaughter of Gustav IV Adolf, the second to last king of Sweden of the House of Holstein-Gottorp. The marriage was childless although Carola miscarried many times. They included:

- A miscarriage of a daughter in the 4th month of pregnancy (19 December 1853).
- A miscarriage of a daughter in the 6th month of pregnancy (16 August 1854).
- A miscarriage in the 1st month of pregnancy (22 January 1855).
- A miscarriage of a son in the 4th and a half month of pregnancy (17 January 1856).
- A miscarriage in the 1st month of pregnancy (4 December 1856).
- A miscarriage in the 1st month of pregnancy (30 January 1857).
- A miscarriage in the 1st month of pregnancy (30 March 1857).
- A miscarriage of a son in the 5th and a half month of pregnancy (11 January 1858).
- A miscarriage of a son in the 4th and a half month of pregnancy (20 March 1859).
- A miscarriage in the 1st month of pregnancy (30 March 1860).

Albert died at his Sibyllenort Palace on 19 June 1902 and was succeeded as king by his brother George. He was buried in Dresden on 23 June, among the mourners present were both the German Emperor Wilhelm II and the Austrian Emperor Franz Joseph I.

== Honours, decorations and awards ==
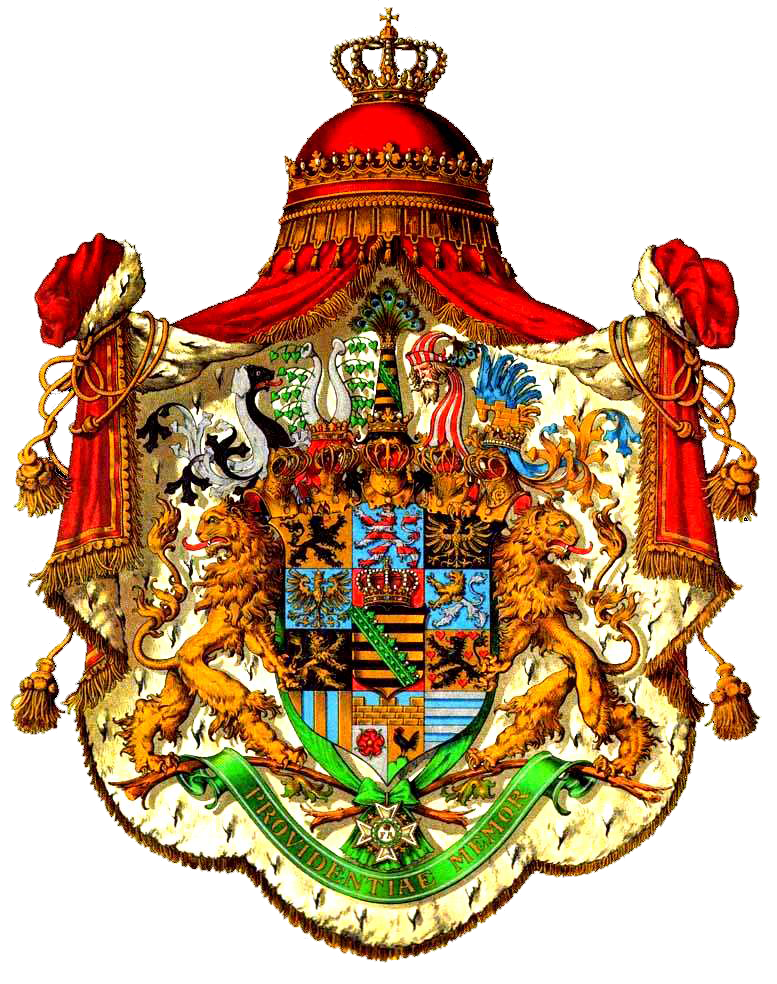
Coat of Arms of the King of Saxony

The King of Saxony bird-of-paradise was named in Albert's honour; the Queen Carola's parotia was named for his wife.

=== German honours ===
- Saxony:
  - Knight of the Rue Crown, 1831
  - Knight of the Military Order of St. Henry, 22 April 1849; Grand Cross, 16 July 1866
  - Grand Cross of the Albert Order
- Prussia:
  - Knight of the Black Eagle, with Collar, 21 September 1844; with Collar, 1861
  - Pour le Mérite (military), 21 June 1849; with Oak Leaves, 6 December 1870; with Crown, 15 July 1899
  - Iron Cross, 1st and 2nd Classes; Grand Cross, 22 March 1871
  - Grand Commander's Cross of the Royal House Order of Hohenzollern, 6 September 1876
- (Saxe-Coburg and Gotha) (Duchy of Saxe-Altenburg) (Saxe-Meiningen) Ernestine duchies: Grand Cross of the Saxe-Ernestine House Order, June 1846
- Hanover: Grand Cross of the Royal Guelphic Order, 1849
- Saxe-Weimar-Eisenach: Grand Cross of the White Falcon, 1 February 1850
- Bavaria:
  - Knight of St. Hubert, 1850
  - Grand Cross of the Military Order of Max Joseph, 14 April 1871
  - Grand Cross of the Military Merit Order, with Swords
- Hesse and by Rhine:
  - Grand Cross of the Ludwig Order, 9 June 1851
  - Military Merit Cross, 9 July 1871
- Baden:
  - Knight of the House Order of Fidelity, 1853
  - Grand Cross of the Zähringer Lion, 1853
  - Grand Cross of the Military Karl-Friedrich Merit Order, 1871
- Hesse-Kassel: Knight of the Golden Lion, 6 October 1854
- Nassau: Knight of the Gold Lion of Nassau, November 1858
- Württemberg:
  - Grand Cross of the Württemberg Crown, 1864
  - Grand Cross of the Military Merit Order, 30 November 1870
- Oldenburg: Grand Cross of the Order of Duke Peter Friedrich Ludwig, with Golden Crown and Swords, 18 January 1871
- Anhalt: Grand Cross of Albert the Bear, 1879

=== Foreign honours ===
- Austrian Empire:
  - Grand Cross of St. Stephen, 1849
  - Knight of the Golden Fleece, 1850
  - Knight of the Military Order of Maria Theresa, 1866
- Kingdom of Sardinia:
  - Knight of the Annunciation, 11 April 1850
  - Grand Cross of Saints Maurice and Lazarus, 1850
- Russian Empire:
  - Knight of St. Andrew, 20 July 1851
  - Knight of St. Alexander Nevsky, 20 July 1851
  - Knight of St. George, 2nd Class, September 1870 – for his defeat of McMahon at the Battle of Beaumont on 30 August
- Belgium: Grand Cordon of the Order of Leopold, 25 May 1853
- Spain: Knight Grand Cross of the Order of Charles III, 4 March 1856; with Collar, 8 October 1883
- French Empire: Grand Cross of the Legion of Honour, August 1867
- Sweden-Norway:
  - Knight of the Seraphim, 2 June 1875
  - Grand Cross of St. Olav, 19 July 1888
- Denmark: Knight of the Elephant, 14 June 1878
- Netherlands: Knight Grand Cross of the Military William Order, 9 July 1878
- United Kingdom: Stranger Knight Companion of the Garter, 20 February 1882
- Empire of Japan: Grand Cordon of the Order of the Chrysanthemum, 27 November 1882
- Siam: Knight of the Order of the Royal House of Chakri, 24 August 1897

== Ancestry ==
Ancestors of Albert, King of Saxony

8. Frederick Christian, Elector of Saxony
4. Maximilian, Hereditary Prince of Saxony
9. Duchess Maria Antonia of Bavaria
2. John of Saxony
10. Ferdinand, Duke of Parma
5. Princess Carolina of Parma
11. Archduchess Maria Amalia of Austria
1. Albert of Saxony
12. Frederick Michael, Count Palatine of Zweibrücken
6. Maximilian I Joseph of Bavaria
13. Countess Palatine Maria Franziska of Sulzbach
3. Princess Amalie Auguste of Bavaria
14. Charles Louis, Hereditary Prince of Baden
7. Princess Caroline of Baden
15. Princess Amalie of Hesse-Darmstadt

== Bibliography ==
- Konrad Sturmhoefel: König Albert von Sachsen. Ein Lebensbild. Voigtländer, Leipzig 1898. (in German)
- Georg von Schimpff: König Albert: Fünfzig Jahre Soldat. Baensch, Dresden 1893. (in German)
- Joseph Kürschner (Hrsg.): König Albert und Sachsenland: Eine Festschrift zum 70. Geburtstage und 25jährigen Regierungsjubiläum des Monarchen. Schwarz, Berlin 1898. (in German)
- Dem Gedächtnis König Alberts von Sachsen, Dresden: v. Zahn & Jaensch, 1902 (in German)
- Ernst von Körner: König Albert von Sachsen: Der Soldat und Feldherr. Oestergaard, Berlin-Schöneberg 1936. (in German)
- Bernd Rüdiger: Wahre Geschichten um König Albert, Taucha: Tauchaer Verl., 1994 (in German)
- Bernhard Schwertfeger (1953). "Albert, König von Sachsen". Neue Deutsche Biographie (in German). Vol. 1. Berlin: Duncker & Humblot. pp. 131–132. (full text online).
- Albert Herzog zu Sachsen: Die Wettiner in Lebensbildern. Styria-Verlag, Graz/Wien/Köln 1995, ISBN 3-222-12301-2. (in German)
- Thomas Eugen Scheerer (Hrsg.): Albert von Sachsen – Kronprinz, Soldat, König. Militärhistorisches Museum der Bundeswehr, Dresden 2002. (in German)
- Arbeitskreis sächsische Militärgeschichte (Hrsg.): Sibyllenort und König Albert von Sachsen: Sonderheft zum 100. Todestag von König Albert. Arbeitskreis Sächsische Militärgeschichte, Dresden 2003. (in German)

Albert, King of Saxony House of Wettin Born: 23 April 1828 Died: 19 June 1902
Regnal titles
| Preceded by John | King of Saxony; 1873–1902 | Succeeded by George |
