= Frederick Augustus of Saxony =

Frederick Augustus of Saxony may refer to:

- Elector Augustus II the Strong (1670–1733), King of Poland and Frederick Augustus I of Saxony
- Elector Augustus III the Saxon (1696–1763), King of Poland and Frederick Augustus II of Saxony
- Frederick Augustus I of Saxony (1750–1827), Elector, later King of Saxony, Duke of Warsaw
- Frederick Augustus II of Saxony (1797–1854), King of Saxony
- Frederick Augustus III of Saxony (1865–1932), last King of Saxony
- Frederick Augustus of Saxe-Eisenach (1663–1684), hereditary Prince of Saxe-Eisenach
