= Maria Josepha Amalia of Saxony =

Queen of Spain from 1819 to 1829

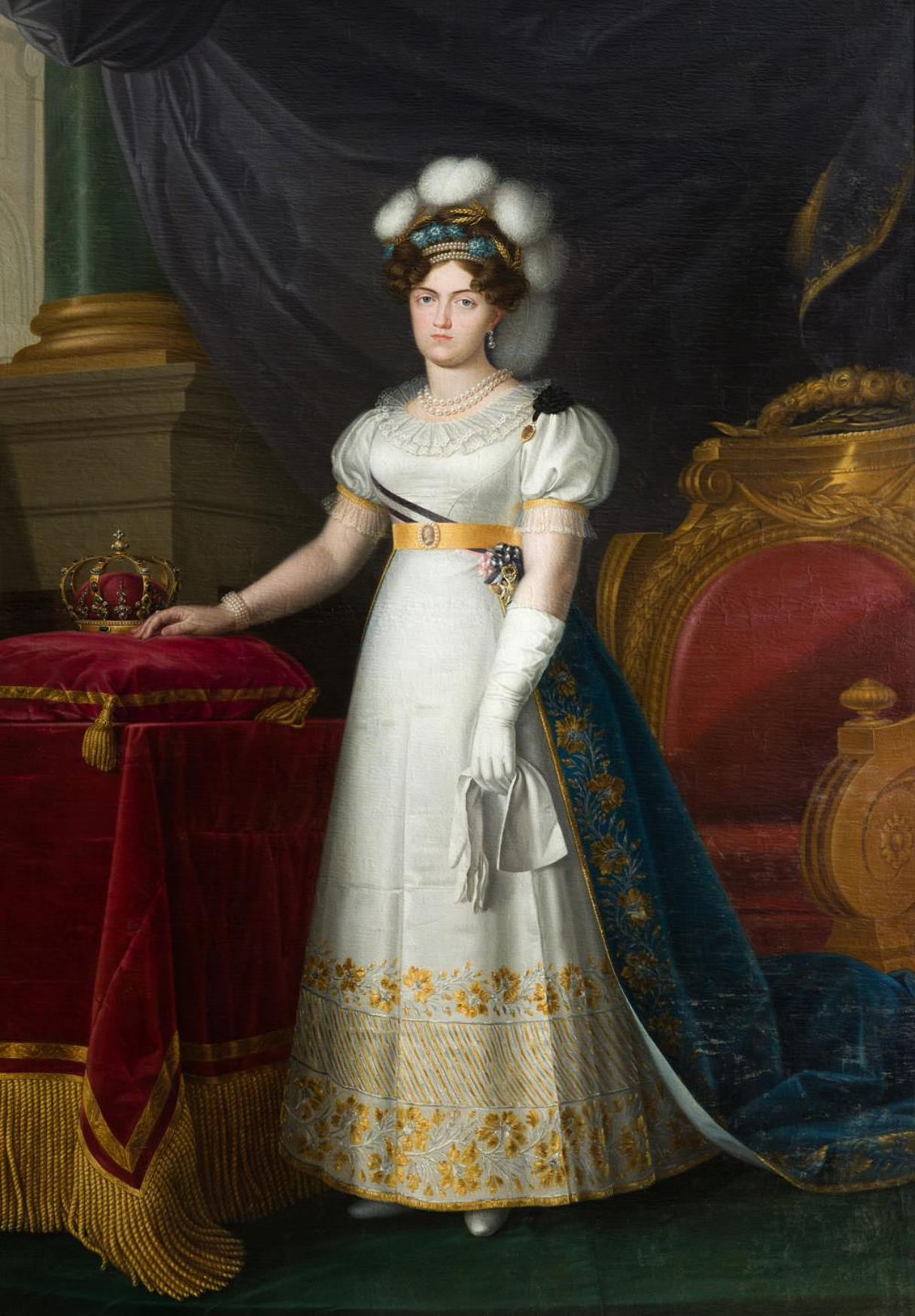
- Portrait by Luis de la Cruz, 1829

Queen consort of Spain
- Tenure: 20 October 1819 – 18 May 1829
- Born: 6 December 1803; Dresden, Electorate of Saxony
- Died: 18 May 1829 (aged 25); Royal Palace of Aranjuez, Aranjuez, Spain
- Burial: Royal Crypt, El Escorial, Spain
- Spouse: Ferdinand VII of Spain (m. 1819)
Names
- Maria Josepha Amalia Beatrix Xaveria Vincentia Aloysia Franziska de Paula Franziska de Chantal Anna Apollonia Johanna Nepomucena Walburga Theresia Ambrosia; Spanish: María Josefa Amalia Beatriz Javiera Vincentia Aloysía Francisca de Paula Francisca de Chantal Ana Apolonia Johanna Nepomucena Walburga Teresa Ambrosia
- House: Wettin
- Father: Maximilian, Crown Prince of Saxony
- Mother: Caroline of Parma
- Coat of arms of Queen Maria Josepha of Spain

Maria Josepha Amalia of Saxony (Maria Josepha Amalia Beatrix Xaveria Vincentia Aloysia Franziska de Paula Franziska de Chantal Anna Apollonia Johanna Nepomucena Walburga Theresia Ambrosia; 6 December 1803 – 18 May 1829) was Queen of Spain as the third wife of King Ferdinand VII of Spain. She was the youngest daughter of Prince Maximilian of Saxony (1759–1838) and his first wife, Princess Carolina of Parma (1770–1804), daughter of Ferdinand I, Duke of Parma. She was a member of the house of Wettin.

== Childhood ==
Princess Maria Josepha Amalia was born in Dresden, Electoral Saxony, to Princess Carolina of Parma and Maximilian, Crown Prince of Saxony. Maria lost her mother when she was only a few months old; due to this, her father sent her to a convent near the Elbe river, where she was brought up by nuns. As a result, Maria had a strict religious upbringing and was a fervent Catholic all her life.

Since King Ferdinand VII of Spain was widowed and looking for a wife, Maria's father, Crown Prince Maximilian, suggested that his youngest daughter Maria could marry him. The marriage was soon negotiated by the Marquis de Cerrlvo. The king was reportedly enthralled by her, and decided to marry her.

== Queen of Spain ==
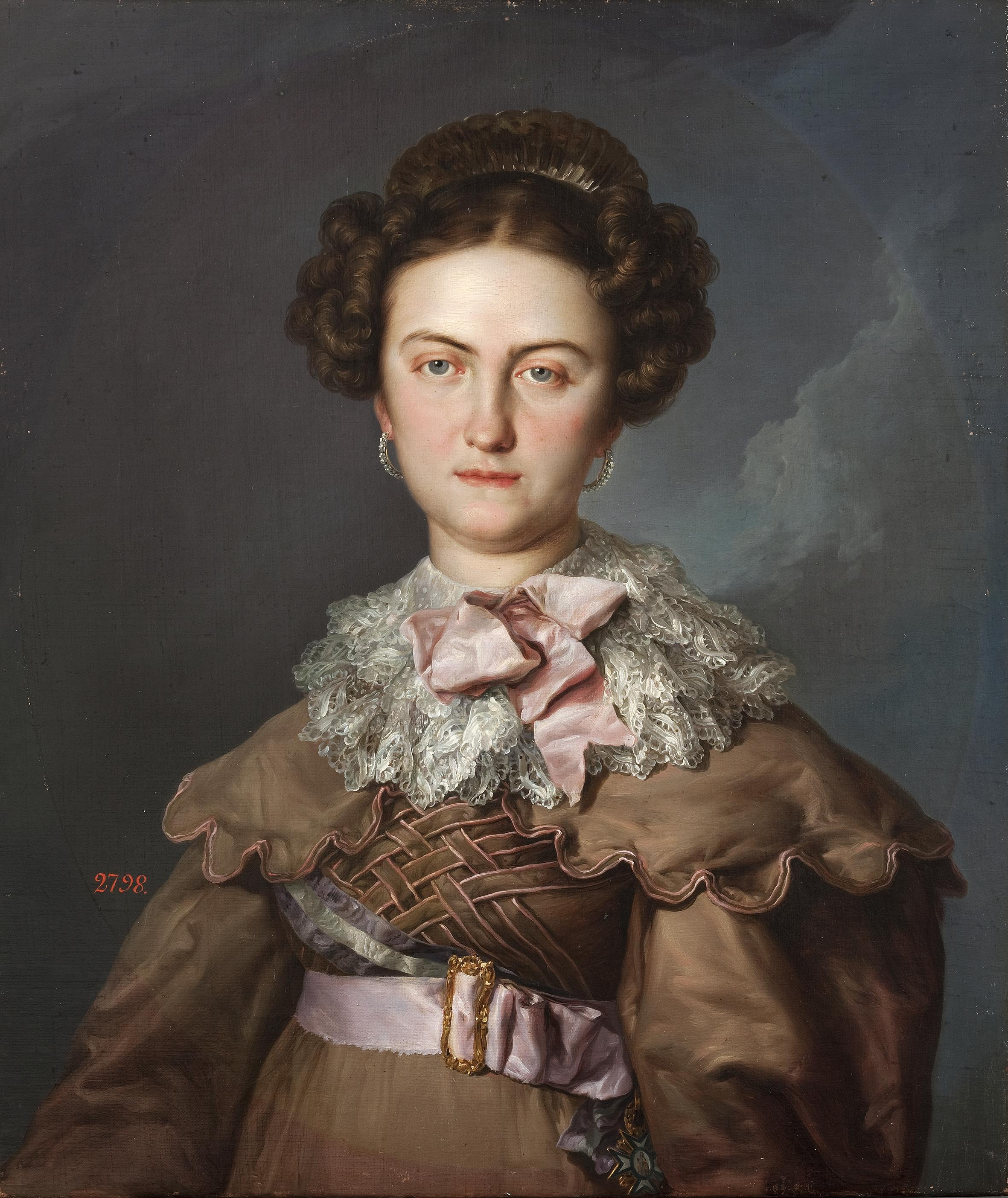
Portrait of María Amalia of Saxony, by Vicente López Portaña. Maria is seen wearing the band and cross of the Order of Noble Ladies of Queen Maria Luisa. The style of the portrait and the mature appearance of the queen have led some authors to affirm that it must have been painted around 1828, one year before the death of the sovereign, and when she was 23 years old.

King Ferdinand and Princess Maria married on 20 October 1819, in Madrid. Henceforth, Maria was known as the queen consort of Spain. Although the new queen was young, naive and inexperienced, the king fell in love with her because of her kind demeanour.

This was the king's third marriage. His first wife had miscarried two pregnancies, while his second wife had given birth to one stillborn child and one daughter who died within a few months. Thus, the King was childless when he married Maria, and it was his ardent desire that this marriage be blessed with living sons. However, the marriage, which lasted ten years until her death, proved childless. According to a gleeful report by the French author Prosper Mérimée, on the wedding night Maria was terrified since she had been educated in a very religious environment, thus never being told anything about sexuality. After Ferdinand entered her chambers completely naked, she ran out of the room screaming in fear, which angered her husband. Maria returned to her chambers moments later, after some convincing from her sister-in-law Infanta Maria Francisca of Portugal, but she was so deeply terrified she urinated and defecated on herself just before intercourse, further angering Ferdinand and preventing the marriage from being consummated. After the failed wedding night, Maria refused to sleep with the king for a long time. It took a personal letter sent by Pope Pius VII in order to convince the queen that sexual relations between spouses were not contrary to the morality of Catholicism. She finally agreed to share the bed with her husband and consummate the marriage, on the condition that they both pray before carrying out the sexual act, which he accepted without objection. Nevertheless, the marriage remained childless and Maria Josepha Amalia withdrew from public life, with long stays in the Palace of Aranjuez, in La Granja de San Ildefonso and the Royal Palace of Riofrio. She died as a result of fevers on 18 May 1829 in Aranjuez, leaving her husband heartbroken, and was buried in El Escorial. Her husband remarried for the fourth time to Maria Christina of the Two Sicilies who eventually gave birth to the future Queen Isabella II of Spain.

== Ancestry ==
Ancestors of Maria Josepha Amalia of Saxony

8. Augustus III of Poland
4. Frederick Christian, Elector of Saxony
9. Maria Josepha of Austria
2. Maximilian, Hereditary Prince of Saxony
10. Charles VII, Holy Roman Emperor
5. Maria Antonia of Bavaria
11. Maria Amalia of Austria
1. Maria Josepha Amalia of Saxony
12. Philip, Duke of Parma
6. Ferdinand, Duke of Parma
13. Louise Élisabeth of France
3. Carolina of Parma
14. Francis I, Holy Roman Emperor
7. Maria Amalia of Austria
15. Maria Theresa of Austria

Maria Josepha Amalia of Saxony House of Wettin Born: 7 December 1803 Died: 18 May 1829
Spanish royalty
Vacant Title last held by Maria Isabel of Portugal	Queen consort of Spain; 20 October 1819 – 18 May 1829	Vacant Title next held by Maria Christina of the Two Sicilies
