= Princess Maria Amalia of Saxony =

Duchess consort of Zweibrücken

Maria Amalia of Saxony
- Duchess consort of Zweibrücken
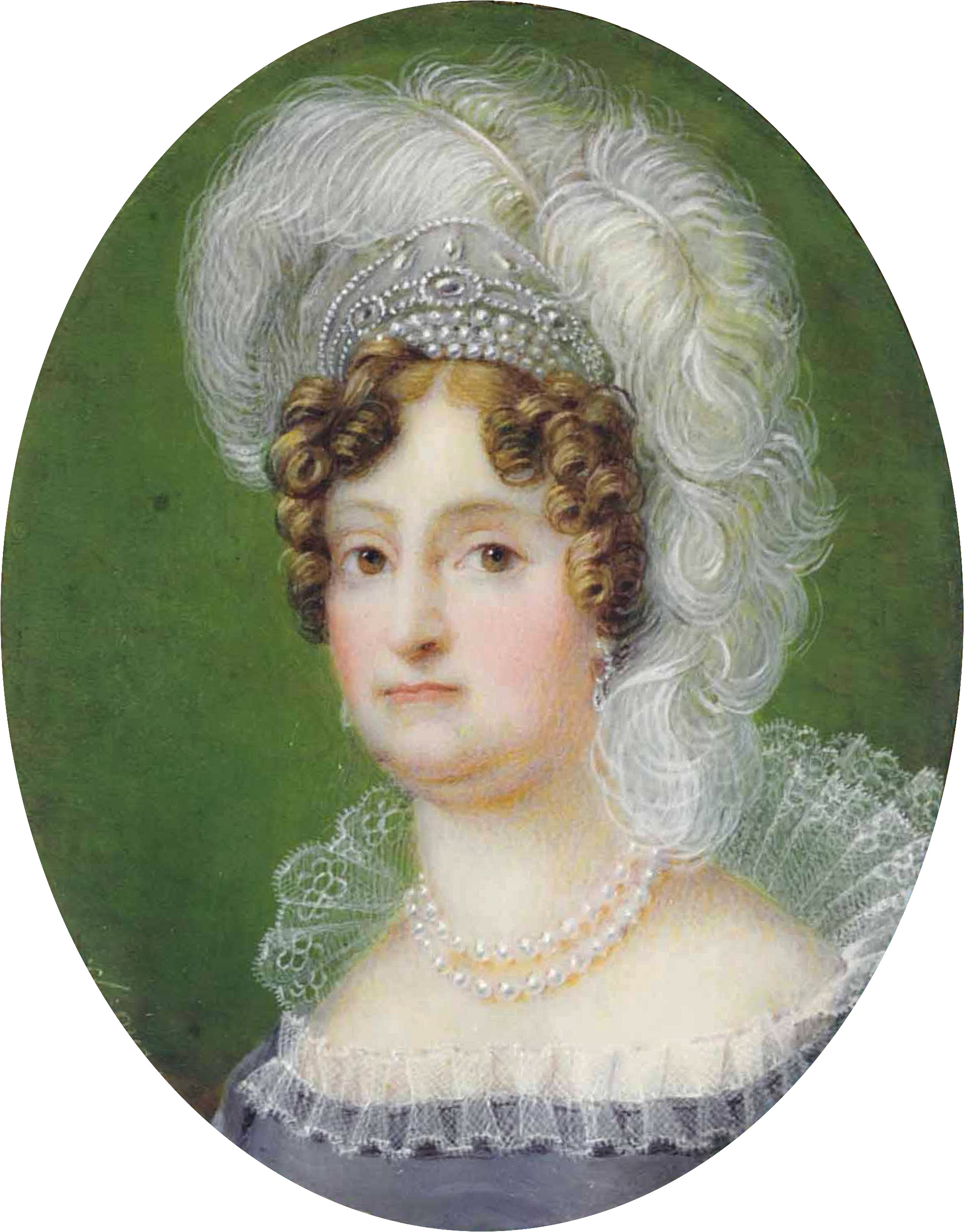
- Portrait c. 1810–21
- Born: 26 September 1757; Dresden
- Died: 20 April 1831 (aged 73); Neuburg an der Donau
- Spouse: Charles II August, Duke of Zweibrücken
- Issue: Charles Augustus Frederick
Names
- German: Maria Amalie Anna Josephina Antonia Justina Augusta Xaveria Aloysia Johanna Nepomucena Magdalena Walpurgis Katharina
- House: Wettin
- Father: Frederick Christian, Elector of Saxony
- Mother: Maria Antonia Walpurgis of Bavaria

Maria Amalia of Saxony (26 September 1757 – 20 April 1831) was a Duchess consort of Zweibrücken by her 1774 marriage to Charles II August, Duke of Zweibrücken.

== Life ==
Maria Amalia was one of nine children born to Frederick Christian, Elector of Saxony and Maria Antonia Walpurgis of Bavaria in Dresden. As her parents were first cousins, Maria Amalia was also a double great granddaughter of Joseph I, Holy Roman Emperor through her two grandmothers: Maria Josepha of Austria and Maria Amalia, Holy Roman Empress, who were sisters.

=== Duchess of Zweibrücken ===
In Dresden 1774, Maria Amalia married Charles of Zweibrücken-Birkenfeld. Previously, he had been bitterly rejected in 1768 as a husband for Maria Amalia of Austria by her mother Maria Theresa of Austria, who felt he was not suitable enough for her. Maria Amalia was thus Charles' second choice. His sister had already been married to Maria Amalia's brother Frederick since 1769.

Charles succeeded as Duke of Zweibrücken in 1775.

Maria Amalia and her husband had only one son, who died in childhood. Charles' brother Maximilian inherited his title upon Charles' death in 1795.

== Death ==
Maria Amalia died on 20 April 1831 in Neuburg.

== Ancestry ==
Ancestors of Princess Maria Amalia of Saxony

8. Augustus II of Poland
4. Augustus III of Poland
9. Christiane Eberhardine of Brandenburg-Bayreuth
2. Frederick Christian, Elector of Saxony
10. Joseph I, Holy Roman Emperor
5. Maria Josepha of Austria
11. Wilhelmina Amalia of Brunswick
1. Maria Amalia of Saxony
12. Maximilian II Emanuel, Elector of Bavaria
6. Charles VII, Holy Roman Emperor
13. Therese Kunigunde of Bavaria
3. Maria Antonia of Bavaria
14. Joseph I, Holy Roman Emperor
7. Maria Amalia of Austria
15. Wilhelmina Amalia of Brunswick

Princess Maria Amalia of Saxony House of Wettin Born: 26 September 1757 Died: 20 April 1831
Royal titles
Preceded by Caroline of Nassau-Saarbrücken	Duchess consort of Zweibrücken; 1775–1795	Succeeded by Augusta Wilhelmine of Hesse-Darmstadt
