= Maximilian, Hereditary Prince of Saxony =

Maximilian
- Hereditary Prince of Saxony
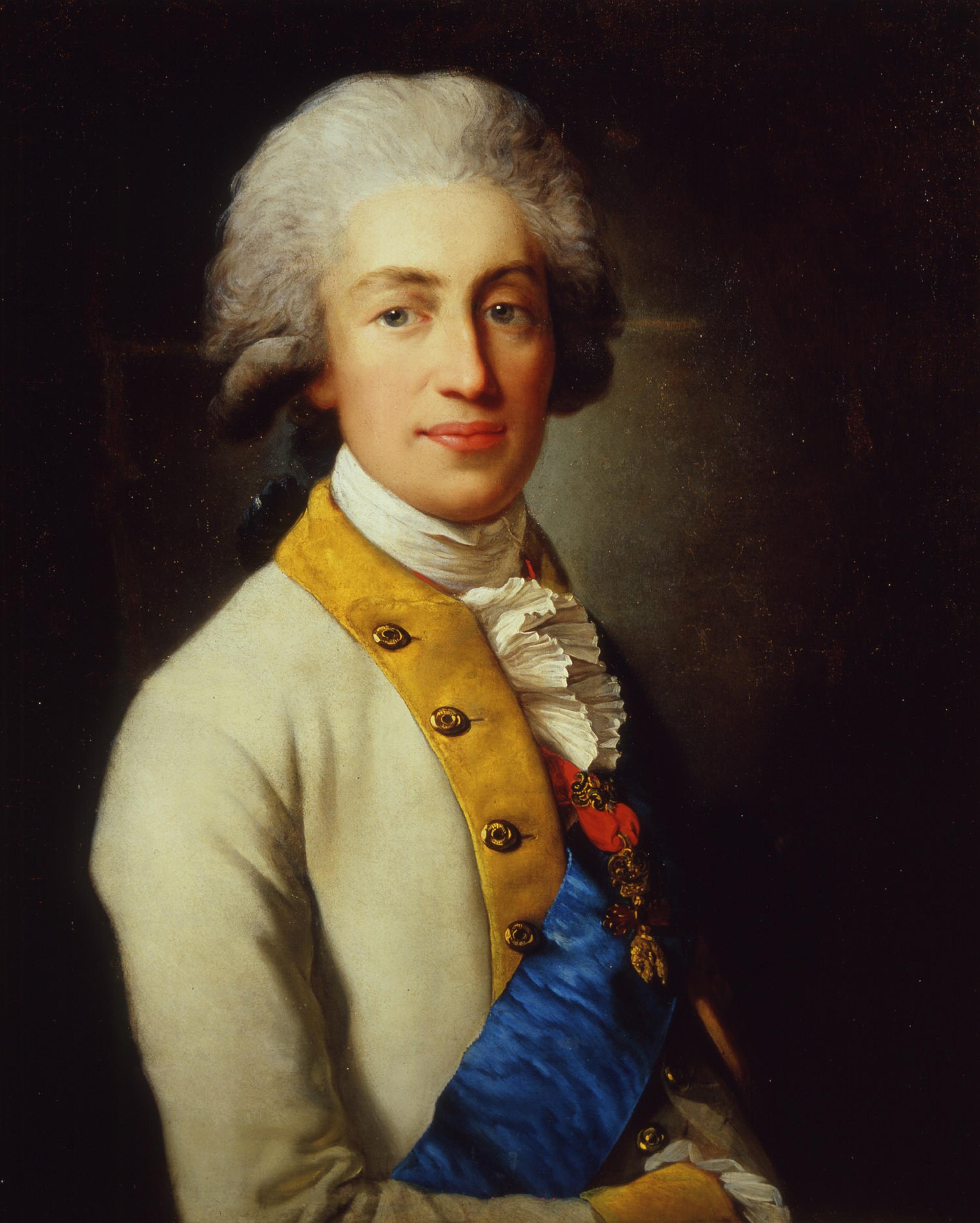
- Portrait by Anton Graff, c. 1792
- Born: 13 April 1759; Dresden
- Died: 3 January 1838 (aged 78); Dresden
- Burial: Katholische Hofkirche
- Spouses: Princess Carolina of Parma (m. 1792; died 1804) Princess Maria Luisa Carlota of Parma (m. 1825)
- Issue: Princess Maria Amalie; Maria Ferdinanda, Grand Duchess of Tuscany; Frederick Augustus II, King of Saxony; Prince Clemens; Maria Anna, Grand Duchess of Tuscany; John, King of Saxony; Maria Josepha Amalia, Queen of Spain
Names
- German: Maximilian Maria Joseph Anton Johann Baptist Johann Evangelista Ignaz Augustin Xavier Aloys Johann Nepomuk Januar Hermenegild Agnellis Paschalis
- House: Wettin
- Father: Frederick Christian, Elector of Saxony
- Mother: Maria Antonia Walpurgis of Bavaria

Prince Maximilian of Saxony (Maximilian Maria Joseph Anton Johann Baptist Johann Evangelista Ignaz Augustin Xavier Aloys Johann Nepomuk Januar Hermenegild Agnellis Paschalis; 13 April 1759 – 3 January 1838) was a German prince and a member of the House of Wettin. He was the sixth child; however, the third child to survive childhood, and youngest surviving son of Frederick Christian, Elector of Saxony, and the German composer Duchess Maria Antonia Walpurgis of Bavaria.

== Life ==
Since he was the youngest son of the family, Maximilian initially had little chance to inherit the Electorate of Saxony. However, by 1800, Maximilian was the third in line to the Electorate due to the children of his two eldest brothers, Frederick Augustus and Anthony, dying in infancy, except Maria Augusta, Frederick Augustus's only surviving offspring. After the creation of the Kingdom of Saxony in 1806, Maximilian became a Prince of Saxony.

After the death of Frederick Augustus in 1827, Anthony succeeded him as King. Maximilian became first in line to the Saxon throne as Hereditary Prince. However, three years later, on 1 September 1830, during the Autumn Disturbances, he renounced his rights of succession in favour of his eldest son, Frederick Augustus. He died eight years later, aged seventy-eight.

== Marriages and issue ==
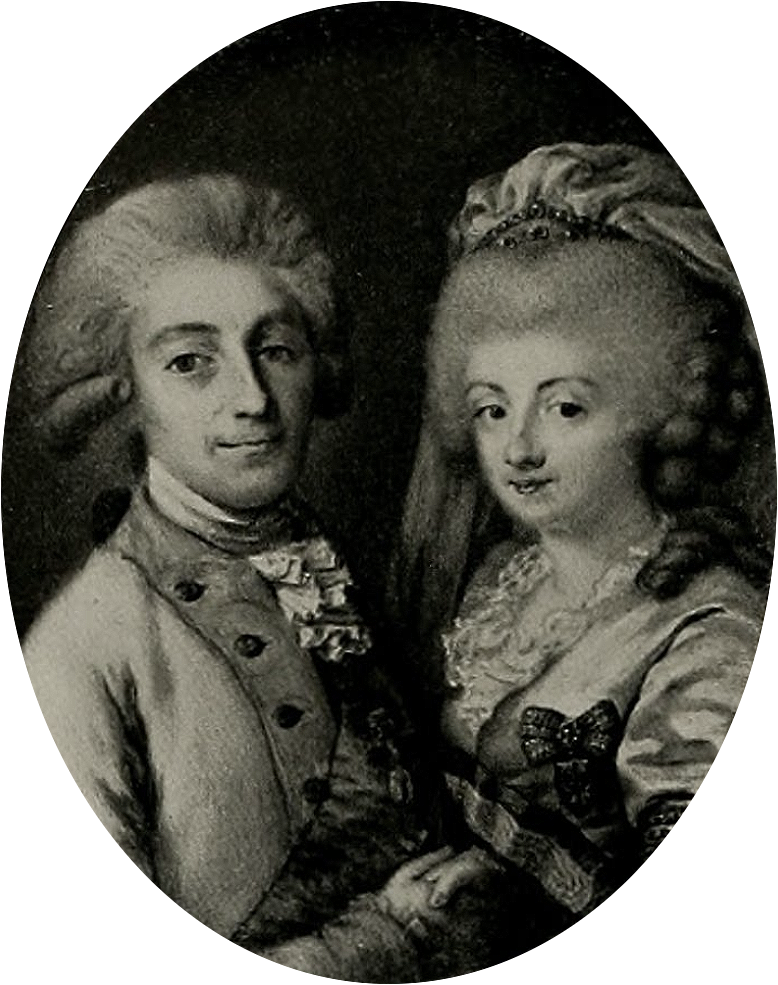
Portrait of Prince Maximilian of Saxony and his wife Princess Maria Carolina of Parma, by Samuel Gránicher.

In Parma on 22 April 1792, Maximilian married Princess Maria Carolina of Bourbon-Parma, the eldest child and daughter of Ferdinand, Duke of Parma, and Maria Amalia of Austria, by proxy, and in person in Dresden on 9 May.

They had seven children:

- Maria Amalia (10 August 1794 – 18 September 1870)
- Maria Ferdinanda (27 April 1796 – 3 January 1865); married on 6 May 1821 to Ferdinand III, Grand Duke of Tuscany.
- Frederick Augustus II (18 May 1797 – 9 August 1854); King of Saxony, 1836. Married on 7 October 1819 to Archduchess Marie Caroline of Austria. Married, secondly, on 24 April 1833 to Princess Maria Anna of Bavaria.
- Clemens Maria Joseph (1 May 1798 – 4 January 1822)
- Maria Anna (15 November 1799 – 24 March 1832); married on 16 November 1817 to Leopold II, Grand Duke of Tuscany.
- Johann I (12 December 1801 – 29 October 1873); King of Saxony, 1854. Married on 10 November 1822 to Princess Amalie of Bavaria.
- Maria Josepha Amalia (6 December 1803 – 17 May 1829); married on 20 October 1819 to King Ferdinand VII of Spain.

In Lucca on 15 October 1825, Maximilian married Maria Luisa Carlotta of Parma, daughter of King Louis of Etruria and niece of his first wife Carolina, by proxy, and in person in Dresden on 7 November. She was 43 years younger than her husband; they had no children.

== Honours ==
- Poland–Lithuania: Knight of the Order of the White Eagle, 1762
- Spain:
  - Knight of the Order of the Golden Fleece, 16 March 1792
  - Grand Cross of the Order of Charles III, 10 December 1824
- French Empire: Grand Eagle of the Legion of Honour, 1807/08
- Kingdom of Saxony:
  - Knight of the Order of the Rue Crown, 1807
  - Grand Cross of the Civil Merit Order, 1815
- Kingdom of Bavaria: Knight of the Order of St. Hubert, 1808
- Kingdom of Portugal: Grand Cross of the Sash of the Two Orders (Christ and St. James), 1825
- Two Sicilies: Grand Cross of the Order of St. Ferdinand and Merit
- Grand Duchy of Tuscany: Grand Cross of the Order of St. Joseph

== Ancestry ==
Ancestors of Maximilian, Hereditary Prince of Saxony

16. John George III, Elector of Saxony
8. Augustus II of Poland
17. Anne Sophie of Denmark
4. Augustus III of Poland
18. Christian Ernst, Margrave of Brandenburg-Bayreuth
9. Christiane Eberhardine of Bayreuth
19. Sophie Louise of Württemberg
2. Frederick Christian, Elector of Saxony
20. Leopold I, Holy Roman Emperor
10. Joseph I, Holy Roman Emperor
21. Eleonor Magdalene of Neuburg
5. Maria Josepha of Austria
22. John Frederick, Duke of Brunswick-Calenberg
11. Wilhelmina Amalia of Brunswick
23. Benedicta Henrietta of the Palatinate
1. Maximilian, Hereditary Prince of Saxony
24. Ferdinand Maria, Elector of Bavaria
12. Maximilian II Emanuel, Elector of Bavaria
25. Henriette Adelaide of Savoy
6. Charles VII, Holy Roman Emperor
26. John III Sobieski
13. Theresa Kunegunda Sobieska
27. Marie Casimire Louise de la Grange d'Arquien
3. Maria Antonia of Bavaria
28. Leopold I, Holy Roman Emperor
14. Joseph I, Holy Roman Emperor
29. Eleonor Magdalene of Neuburg
7. Maria Amalia of Austria
30. John Frederick, Duke of Brunswick-Calenberg
15. Wilhelmina Amalia of Brunswick
31. Benedicta Henrietta of the Palatinate
