= John, King of Saxony =

King of Saxony (1801–1873)

John
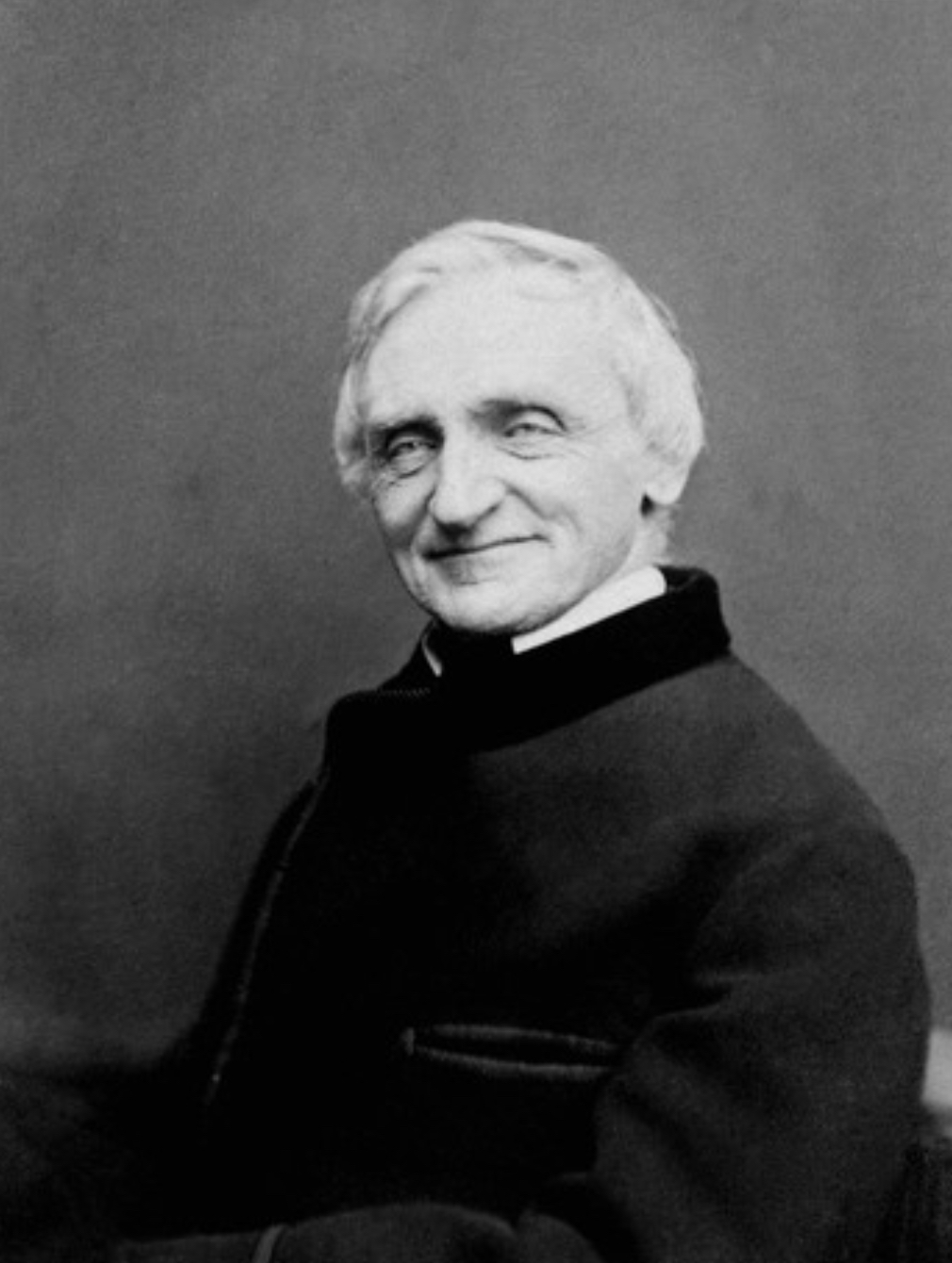
- King John c. 1870–73

King of Saxony
- Reign: 9 August 1854 – 29 October 1873
- Predecessor: Frederick Augustus II
- Successor: Albert
- Born: 12 December 1801; Dresden, Electorate of Saxony, Holy Roman Empire
- Died: 29 October 1873 (aged 71); Pillnitz, Dresden, Kingdom of Saxony, German Empire
- Burial: Katholische Hofkirche
- Spouse: Amalie Auguste of Bavaria (m. 1822)
- Issue more...: King Albert; Elisabeth, Duchess of Genoa; King George; Princess Sidonie of Saxony; Anna, Grand Princess of Tuscany; Margaretha, Archduchess of Austria; Sophie, Duchess in Bavaria
Names
- German: Johann Nepomuk Maria Joseph Anton Xaver Vincenz Aloys Franz de Paula Stanislaus Bernhard Paul Felix Damasus; English: John Nepomuk Maria Joseph Antony Xavier Vincent Aloysius Francis de Paula Stanislaus Bernard Paul Felix Damasus
- House: Wettin (Albertine line)
- Father: Maximilian, Hereditary Prince of Saxony
- Mother: Princess Carolina of Parma
- Religion: Roman Catholicism

John (German: Johann; Polish: Jan; 12 December 1801 – 29 October 1873) was King of Saxony from 9 August 1854 until his death in 1873. He was a member of the House of Wettin. During his reign, Saxony became a part of the German Empire.

== Early life ==
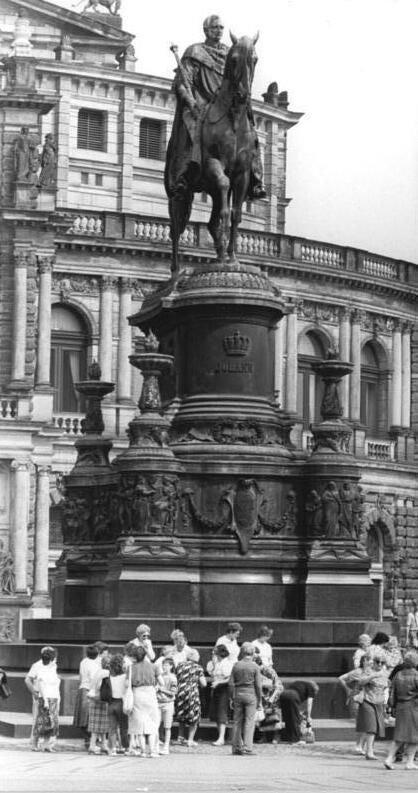
John of Saxony Monument, Dresden

John was born in Dresden, the third son of Maximilian, Hereditary Prince of Saxony—younger son of the Elector Frederick Christian of Saxony—by his first wife, Carolina of Bourbon, Princess of Parma. Highly regarded as a scholar-king, he studied law and humanities at Leipzig University where he famously translated Dante's Divine Comedy into German under the pseudonym "Philalethes" and Leipzig University's historic Johanneum building was named in his honour.

During most of his life, John stood little chance of inheriting the Saxon Crown: he was preceded by his father and two older brothers, Frederick Augustus and Clement. However, in 1822 Clement died unmarried in Italy, and John was now only preceded in the line of succession by his older brother Frederick Augustus.

When his uncle Anton succeeded his older brother as king (1827), John became the third in line to the throne, and after his father Maximilian renounced his succession rights in 1830, John became in the second in line. John's older brother became King Frederick Augustus II in 1836; now he was the first in line of succession to the throne. The King, married twice, was childless. John remained as heir presumptive during all the reign of his brother.

== King of Saxony ==
John became King of Saxony after the death of his brother Frederick Augustus II on 9 August 1854.

The Judiciary Organization of 1855, the extension of the railroad network, the introduction of the freedom of trade are attributed mainly to his suggestion and promotion. Under his government, came the acceptance of the French Commercial Treaty (1862) and the acknowledgment of a contract with Italy. He exerted himself under influence of his minister Friedrich Ferdinand von Beust for the Great Germany Solution (de: Großdeutsche Lösung) of the imperial arrangement (under inclusion of Austria). In 1866 Saxony fought on the Austrian side in the Austro-Prussian War. Finally, after the defeat of the Battle of Königgrätz, Saxony joined the North German Confederation and in 1871 the German Empire under the hegemony of the Kingdom of Prussia. The King died two years later, aged seventy-one.

Beyond his political work, Johann was busy with literature. Under the pseudonym Philalethes he translated to German Dante's Divine Comedy; some parts of this work were placed in the Schloss Weesenstein. The Dresden district of Johannstadt was named after him.

== Marriage and issue ==
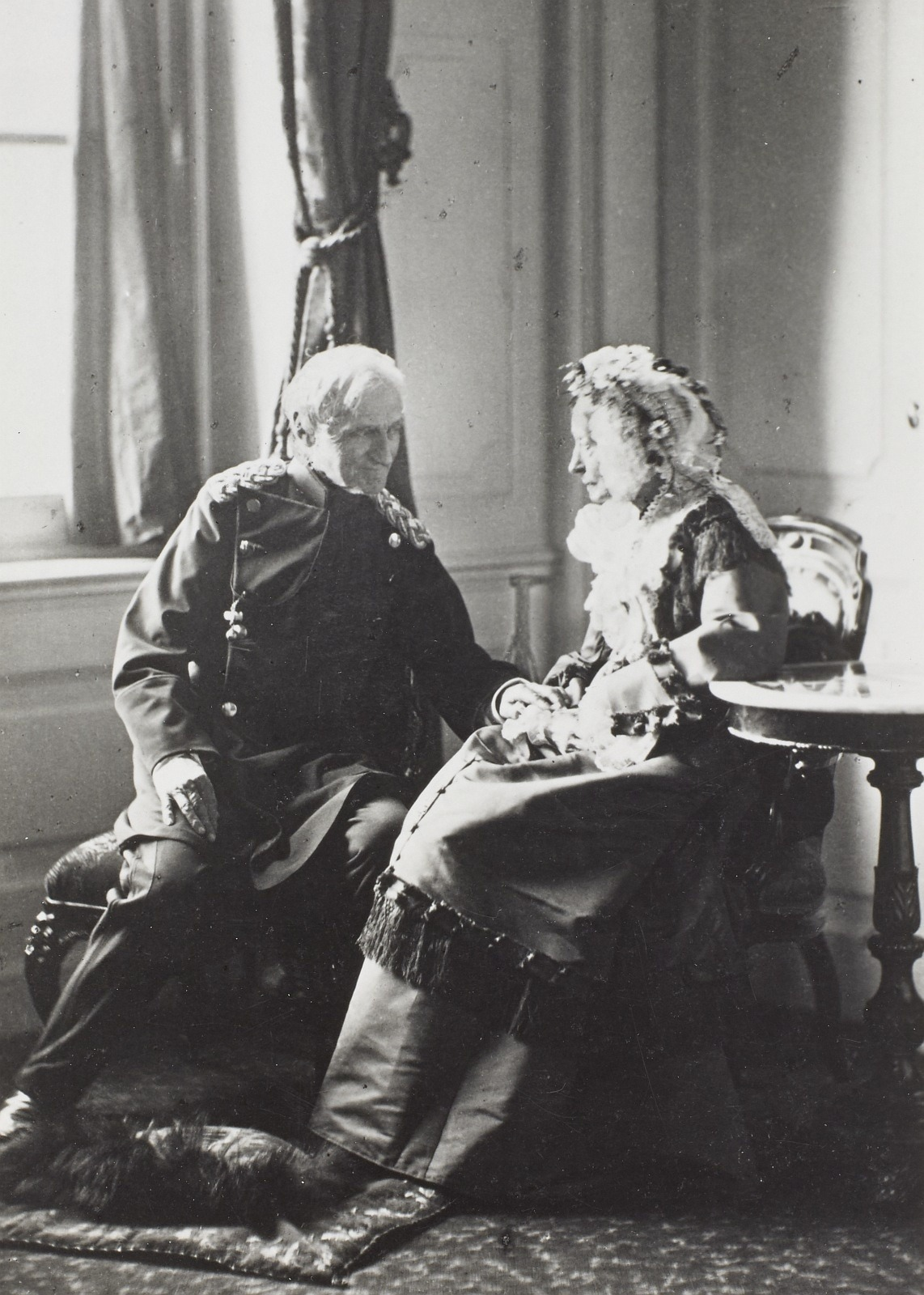
Photograph of King John and his wife Amalie Auguste of Bavaria, c. 1872.

In Munich on 10 November 1822 (by proxy) and again in Dresden on 21 November (in person), Johann married Princess Amalia of Bavaria (Amalie Auguste), daughter of King Maximilian I Joseph of Bavaria. They had nine children:

1. Maria Auguste Fredericka Karoline Ludovike Amalie Maximiliane Franziska Nepomucena Xaveria (b. Dresden, 22 January 1827 – d. Dresden, 8 October 1857), known as Maria; died unmarried.
2. Frederick Augustus Albert Anton Ferdinand Joseph Karl Maria Baptist Nepomuk Wilhelm Xaver Georg Fidelis (b. Dresden, 23 April 1828 – d. Schloss Sibyllenort, 19 June 1902), King Albert of Saxony.
3. Maria Elisabeth Maximiliana Ludovika Amalie Franziska Sophia Leopoldine Anna Baptista Xaveria Nepomucena (b. Dresden, 4 February 1830 – d. Stresa, 14 August 1912), known as Elisabeth; married firstly on 22 April 1850 to Ferdinando, Prince of Savoy and Sardinia and 1st Duke of Genoa, and secondly on 4 October 1856 to Niccolò, Marchese Rapallo.
4. Frederick Augustus Ernst Ferdinand Wilhelm Ludwig Anton Nepomuk Maria Baptist Xaver Vincenz (b. Dresden, 5 April 1831 – d. Schloss Weesenstein, 12 May 1847), known as Ernst; died unmarried and without issue.
5. Frederick Augustus Georg Ludwig Wilhelm Maximilian Karl Maria Nepomuk Baptist Xaver Cyriacus Romanus (b. Pillnitz, 8 August 1832 – d. Pillnitz, 15 October 1904), King Georg of Saxony (1902).
6. Maria Sidonia Ludovica Mathilde Wilhelmine Auguste Xaveria Baptista Nepomucena Veronica Hyacinthia Deodata (b. Pillnitz, 16 August 1834 – d. Dresden, 1 March 1862), known as Sidonia; died unmarried.
7. Anna Maria Maximiliane Stephania Karoline Johanna Luisa Xaveria Nepomucena Aloysia Benedicta, (b. Dresden, 4 January 1836 – d. Naples, 10 February 1859), known as Anna; married on 24 November 1856 to Ferdinand IV, Grand Duke of Tuscany.
8. Margarete Karoline Fredericka Cecilie Auguste Amalie Josephine Elisabeth Maria Johanna (b. Dresden, 24 May 1840 – d. Monza, 15 September 1858), known as Margarete; married on 4 November 1856 to Archduke Karl Ludwig of Austria, her cousin.
9. Sophie Maria Friederike Auguste Leopoldine Alexandrine Ernestine Albertine Elisabeth (b. Dresden, 15 March 1845 – d. Munich, 9 March 1867), known as Sophie; married on 11 February 1865 to Karl Theodor, Duke in Bavaria, her cousin and brother of Empress Elisabeth of Austria.

== Death ==
King John of Saxony died at Pillnitz on 29 October 1873 at the age of 71. His body was interred in the Königsgruft of the Hofkirche in Dresden.

== Honours ==
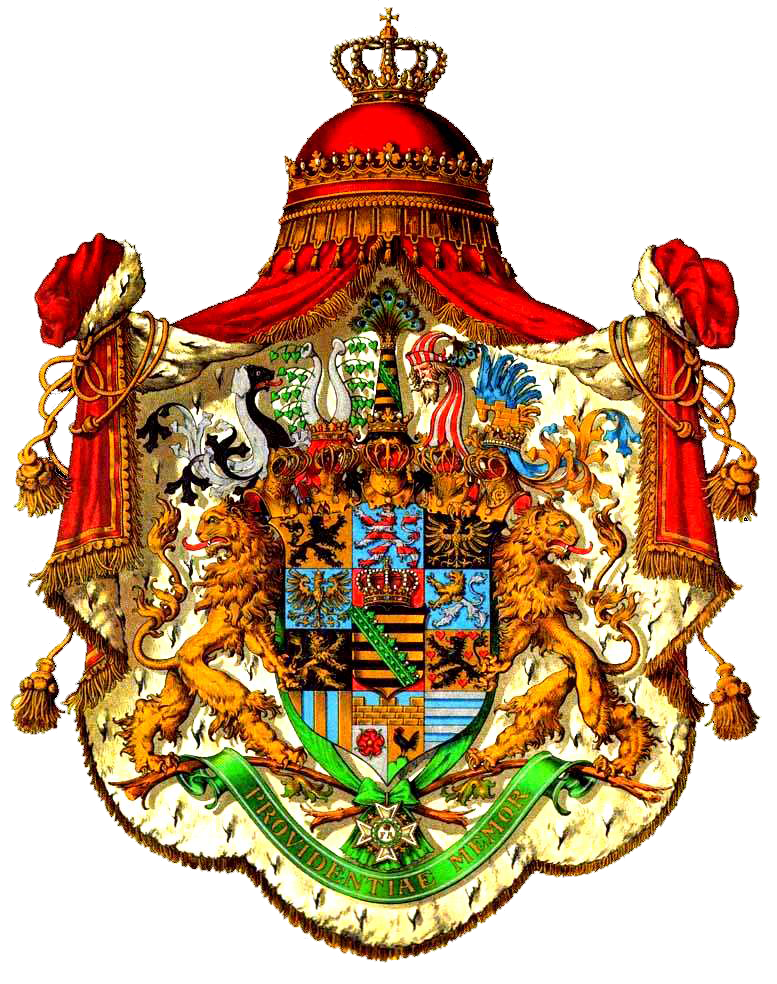
Coat of Arms of the King of Saxony

- Kingdom of Saxony:
  - Knight of the Rue Crown, 1807
  - Grand Cross of the Civil Merit Order, 1815
  - Grand Cross of the Albert Order
- Kingdom of Bavaria: Knight of St. Hubert, 1822
- Spain: Knight of the Golden Fleece, 18 March 1825
- (Saxe-Coburg and Gotha) (Duchy of Saxe-Altenburg) (Saxe-Meiningen) Ernestine duchies: Grand Cross of the Saxe-Ernestine House Order, February 1838
- Russian Empire: Knight of St. Andrew, 5 April 1840
- Kingdom of Prussia:
  - Knight of the Black Eagle, 3 September 1840
  - Pour le Mérite (civil), 21 January 1869
- Austrian Empire: Grand Cross of St. Stephen, 1841
- Kingdom of Sardinia: Knight of the Annunciation, 12 March 1850
- Ascanian duchies: Grand Cross of Albert the Bear, 28 April 1853
- Belgium: Grand Cordon of the Order of Leopold, 25 May 1853
- Baden:
  - Knight of the House Order of Fidelity, 1853
  - Grand Cross of the Zähringer Lion, 1853
- Grand Duchy of Hesse: Grand Cross of the Ludwig Order, 10 August 1854
- Oldenburg: Grand Cross of the Order of Duke Peter Friedrich Ludwig, with Golden Crown, 31 August 1854
- Württemberg: Grand Cross of the Württemberg Crown, 1854
- Nassau: Knight of the Gold Lion of Nassau, February 1860
- Kingdom of Hanover:
  - Knight of St. George, 1860
  - Grand Cross of the Royal Guelphic Order

== Ancestry ==
Ancestors of John, King of Saxony

8. Augustus III of Poland
4. Frederick Christian, Elector of Saxony
9. Maria Josepha of Austria
2. Maximilian, Hereditary Prince of Saxony
10. Charles VII, Holy Roman Emperor
5. Maria Antonia of Bavaria
11. Maria Amalia of Austria
1. John of Saxony
12. Philip, Duke of Parma
6. Ferdinand, Duke of Parma
13. Louise Élisabeth of France
3. Carolina of Parma
14. Francis I, Holy Roman Emperor
7. Maria Amalia of Austria
15. Maria Theresa of Austria

John, King of Saxony House of Wettin Born: 12 December 1801 Died: 29 October 1873
Regnal titles
Preceded by Frederick Augustus II	King of Saxony; 1854–1873	Succeeded by Albert
