= Princess Carolina of Parma =

Parmesan princess (1770–1804)

Carolina of Parma
- Princess of Saxony
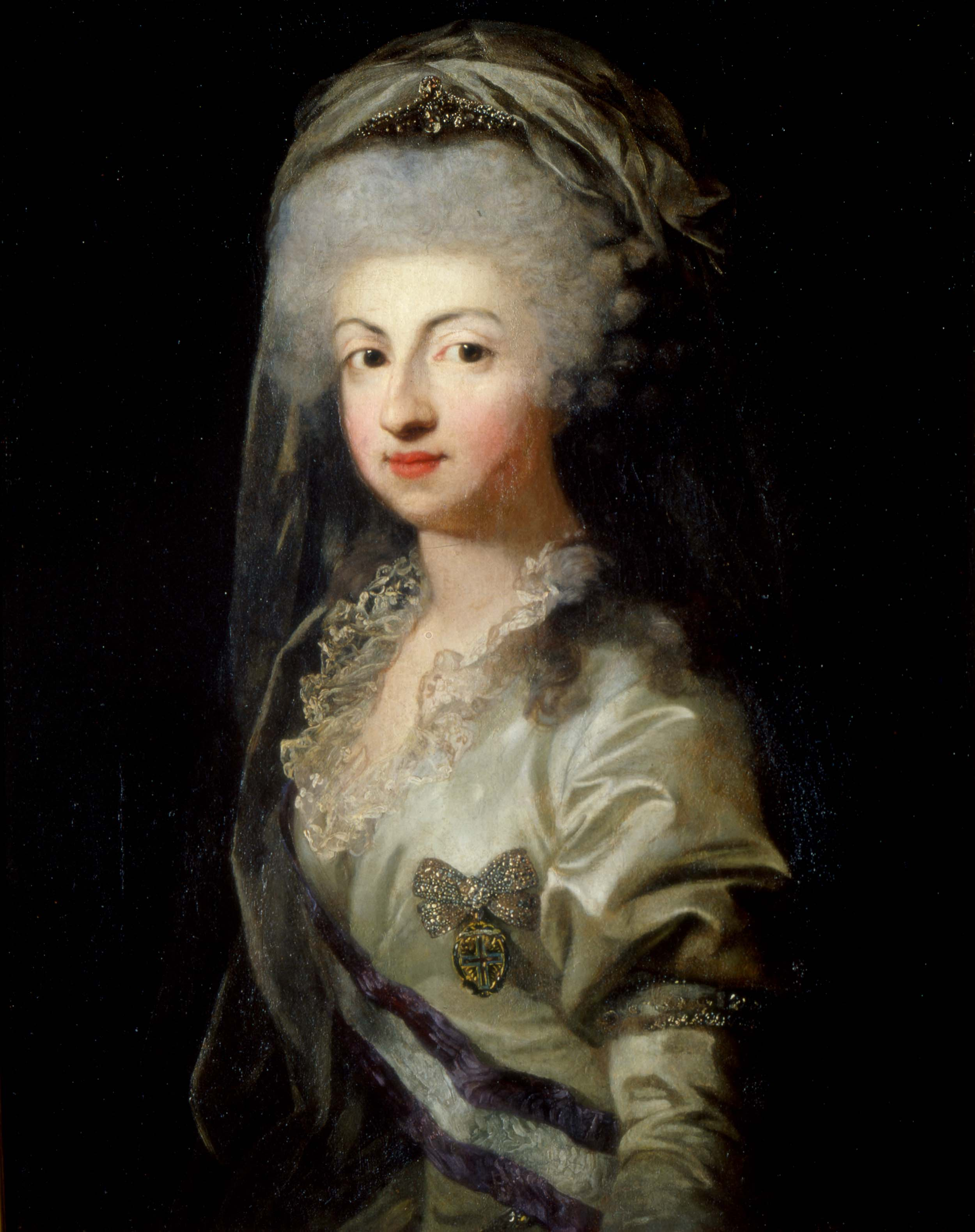
- Princess Carolina portrayed by Anton Graff, 1792
- Born: 22 November 1770; Ducal Palace of Colorno, Parma
- Died: 1 March 1804 (aged 33); Dresden Castle, Dresden
- Burial: Katholische Hofkirche
- Spouse: Prince Maximilian of Saxony (m. 1792)
- Issue: Princess Maria Amalie; Maria Ferdinanda, Grand Duchess of Tuscany; Frederick Augustus II, King of Saxony; Prince Clemens; Maria Anna, Grand Duchess of Tuscany; John, King of Saxony; Maria Josepha Amalia, Queen of Spain
Names
- Italian: Carolina Maria Teresa Giuseppa di Borbone-Parma; English: Caroline Mary Theresa Josepha of Bourbon-Parma; German: Karoline Marie Theresia Josefa von Bourbon-Parma; French: Caroline Marie Thérèse Josèphe de Bourbon-Parme
- House: Bourbon-Parma
- Father: Ferdinand I, Duke of Parma
- Mother: Archduchess Maria Amalia of Austria

Princess Carolina of Parma (Caroline Maria Teresa Giuseppa; 22 November 1770 – 1 March 1804) was a Princess of Parma by birth, and Princess of Saxony by marriage to Prince Maximilian of Saxony. She was the eldest child of Ferdinand I, Duke of Parma, and Archduchess Maria Amalia of Austria.

== Biography ==
Her full baptismal name was Carolina Maria Teresa Giuseppa Giovanna. She was named after her godparents, her paternal great-uncle Charles III of Spain and her maternal grandmother Empress Maria Theresa.

Carolina was the eldest child of Ferdinand I, Duke of Parma and his wife Maria Amalia of Austria. When Maria Amalia's sister Maria Christina, Duchess of Teschen, and her husband, Albert of Saxony, Duke of Teschen, visited Parma in 1776, Prince Albert wrote in his journal the following about Carolina: "Her (Maria Amalia's) eldest daughter is the most beautiful child one can imagine, yet she has an air of gloom and sadness about her, that one can only look at her with a sense of melancholy". Carolina and her brother Louis were the favorites of their parents. They were personally instructed in religion by their father, despite the fact that their younger children were actually more interested in the subject than them. In 1778, her brother Luigi hit his head on a marble table while playing with Carolina, and afterward suffered from epilepsy.

The mother of Carolina preferred her to marry a German prince. Reportedly, however, her marriage was not arranged. Instead, her mother introduced Carolina to Maximilian during his frequent trips to Italy, and when the Parmesan Ducal family visited Saxony in the late 1780s, Carolina was able to spend time with Maximilian and reportedly fell in love with him. Consequently, she was described as eager to marry him, and her mother Amalia gave her permission despite the fact that Maximilian was not the heir to a throne. The marriage and life of Carolina in Saxony are described as happy and harmonious. When her mother moved to Prague in 1804, she was able to have more contact with her, though she was not able to visit her before her death.

Princess Carolina died of fever on March 1, 1804 in Dresden. More than two decades after, her husband married her niece Princess Maria Luisa Carlota of Parma.

== Marriage and issue ==
Carolina married on 22 April 1792 in Parma (by proxy) and on 9 May (in person) Prince Maximilian of Saxony, fifth and youngest son of Elector Frederick Christian of Saxony. They had seven children; two of their sons became Kings of Saxony and one of their daughters married the King of Spain.

Name	Picture	Birth	Death	Notes
Maria Amalia	María Amalia of Saxony by López Portaña	Dresden, 10 August 1794	Pillnitz, 18 September 1870	Known as Amalia. German composer and dramatist under the pen names A. Serena and Amalie Heiter. Had no issue.
Maria Ferdinanda	Maria Ferdinanda of Saxony, Grand Duchess of Tuscany	Dresden, 27 April 1796	Schloss Brandeis, Bohemia, 3 January 1865	Known as Maria. Married on 6 May 1821 to Ferdinand III, Grand Duke of Tuscany. Had no issue.
Frederick Augustus II	Friedrich August II of Saxony	Dresden, 27 April 1796	Brennbüchel, 9 August 1854	King of Saxony (1836-1854). Had one illegitimate issue.
Clemens Maria Joseph	Clément de Saxe	Dresden, 18 May 1797	Pisa, 4 January 1822	Known as Klemens. Had no issue.
Maria Anna	Gaspero Martellini - Marianna Carolina di Sassonia - 1821	Dresden, 15 November 1799	Pisa, 24 March 1832	Known as Anna. Married on 16 November 1817 to Leopold II, Grand Duke of Tuscany. Had three daughters.
Johann I	Photograph of John, King of Saxony (1801-1873)	Dresden, 12 December 1801	Pillnitz, 29 October 1873	King of Saxony (1854-1873). Married on 10 November 1822 to Princess Amalie Auguste of Bavaria by proxy and on 21 November 1822 in person. Had nine children.
Maria Josepha Amalia	Luis de la Cruz y Ríos - Queen Maria Josefa Amalia of Saxony	Dresden, 6 December 1803	Aranjuez, 17 May 1829	Known as Josepha. Married on 20 October 1819 to King Ferdinand VII of Spain. Had no issue.

== Ancestry ==
Ancestors of Princess Carolina of Parma

8. Philip V of Spain
4. Philip, Duke of Parma
9. Elisabeth of Parma
2. Ferdinand, Duke of Parma
10. Louis XV of France
5. Louise-Élisabeth of France
11. Marie Leszczyńska
1. Carolina of Parma
12. Leopold, Duke of Lorraine
6. Francis I, Holy Roman Emperor
13. Élisabeth Charlotte of Orléans
3. Maria Amalia of Austria
14. Charles VI, Holy Roman Emperor
7. Maria Theresa of Austria
15. Elisabeth Christine of Brunswick
