= Frederick Augustus II of Saxony =

King of Saxony from 1836 to 1854

Frederick Augustus II
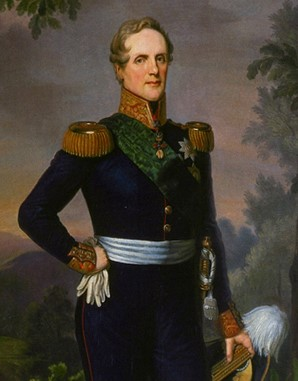
- Frederick Augustus in 1839

King of Saxony
- Reign: 6 June 1836 – 9 August 1854
- Predecessor: Anthony
- Successor: John
- Born: 18 May 1797; Pillnitz, Dresden, Electorate of Saxony, Holy Roman Empire
- Died: 9 August 1854 (aged 57); Karrösten, Austrian Empire
- Burial: Katholische Hofkirche
- Spouses: Marie Caroline of Austria (m. 1819; died 1832) Maria Anna of Bavaria (m. 1833)
- Issue: Theodor Uhlig (illegitimate)
- House: Wettin (Albertine line)
- Father: Maximilian, Hereditary Prince of Saxony
- Mother: Princess Caroline of Parma
- Religion: Roman Catholicism

Frederick Augustus II (German: Friedrich August II.; 18 May 1797 – 9 August 1854) was King of Saxony and a member of the House of Wettin.

He was the eldest son of Maximilian, Prince of Saxony – younger son of the Elector Frederick Christian of Saxony – by his first wife, Caroline of Bourbon, Princess of Parma.

== Life ==
=== Early years ===
From his birth, it was clear that one day Frederick Augustus would become the ruler of Saxony. His father was the only son of the Elector Frederick Christian of Saxony who left surviving male issue. When King Frederick Augustus I died (1827) and Anton succeeded him as King, Frederick Augustus became second in line to the throne, preceded only by his father Maximilian. However, he took no part in the administration of the country.

He received a comprehensive education, which included attending lectures in jurisprudence, political science, and military strategy at Leipzig University. He was an officer in the War of the Sixth Coalition. However, he had little interest in military affairs.

=== Co-Regent to the Kingdom ===
The July Revolution of 1830 in France marked the beginning of disturbances in Saxony that autumn. The people claimed a change in the constitution and demanded a young regent of the kingdom to share the government with the King Anton. On 1 September the Prince Maximilian renounced his rights of succession in favor of his son Frederick Augustus, who was proclaimed Prince Co-Regent (de: Prinz-Mitregenten) of Saxony. On 2 February 1832 Frederick Augustus brought Free Autonomy to the cities. Also, by an edict of 17 March of that year, the farmers were freed from the corvée and hereditary submission. His popularity and liberal reforms quickly ended the discontent.

=== King of Saxony ===
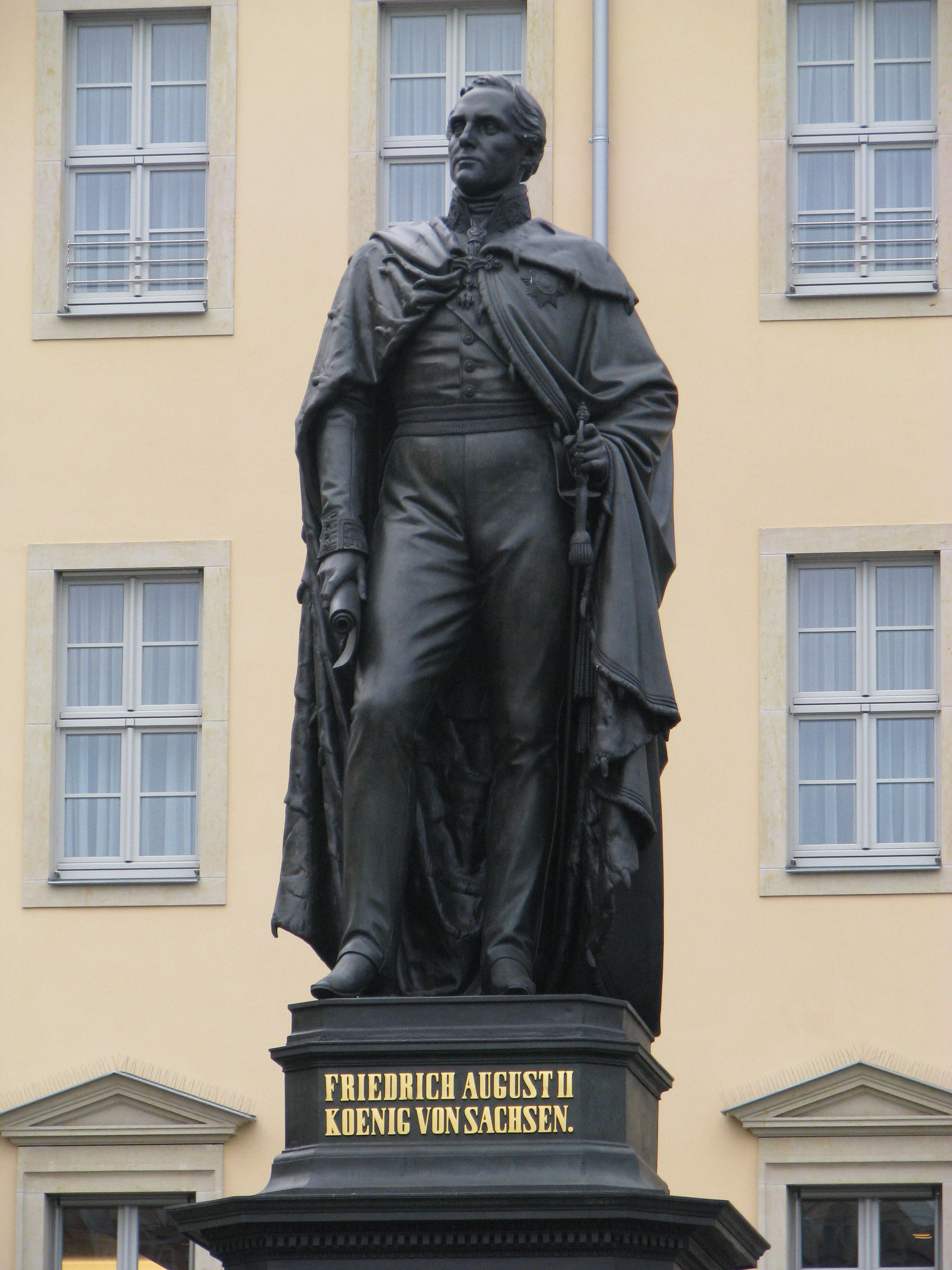
Statue of Frederick Augustus II in Neumarkt

On 6 June 1836, King Anton died and Frederick Augustus succeeded him. As an intelligent man, he was quickly popular with the people as he had been since the time of his regency. The new king solved political questions only from a pure sense of duty. Mostly he preferred to leave these things on the hands of his ministers.

A standardized jurisdiction for Saxony created the Criminal Code of 1836. During the Revolutionary disturbances of 1848 (March Revolution), he appointed liberal ministers in the government, lifted censorship, and remitted a liberal electoral law. Later his attitude changed. On 28 April Frederick August II dissolved the Parliament, and in 1849 he was forced to flee to the Königstein Fortress. The May Uprising was crushed by Saxon and Prussian troops and Frederick was able to return after only a few days.

From that time onward his reign was tranquil and prosperous. Later Count Beust, leader of the Austrian and feudal party in Saxony, became his principal minister and guided his policy on most occasions.

=== Journey through England and Scotland ===
In 1844 Frederick Augustus, accompanied by his personal physician Carl Gustav Carus, made an informal (incognito) visit to England and Scotland. Among places they visited were Lyme Regis where he purchased from the local fossil collector and dealer, Mary Anning, an ichthyosaur skeleton for his own extensive natural history collection. It was not a state visit, but the King was the guest of Queen Victoria and Prince Albert at Windsor Castle, visited many of the sights in London and in the university cities of Oxford and Cambridge, and toured widely in England, Wales and Scotland.

In addition to his interest in fossils, Frederick Augustus devoted his leisure hours chiefly to the study of botany. He made botanical excursions into different countries, and his Flora Marienbadensis, oder Pflanzen und Gebirgsarten, gesammelt und beschrieben was published in Prague in 1837.

== Death ==
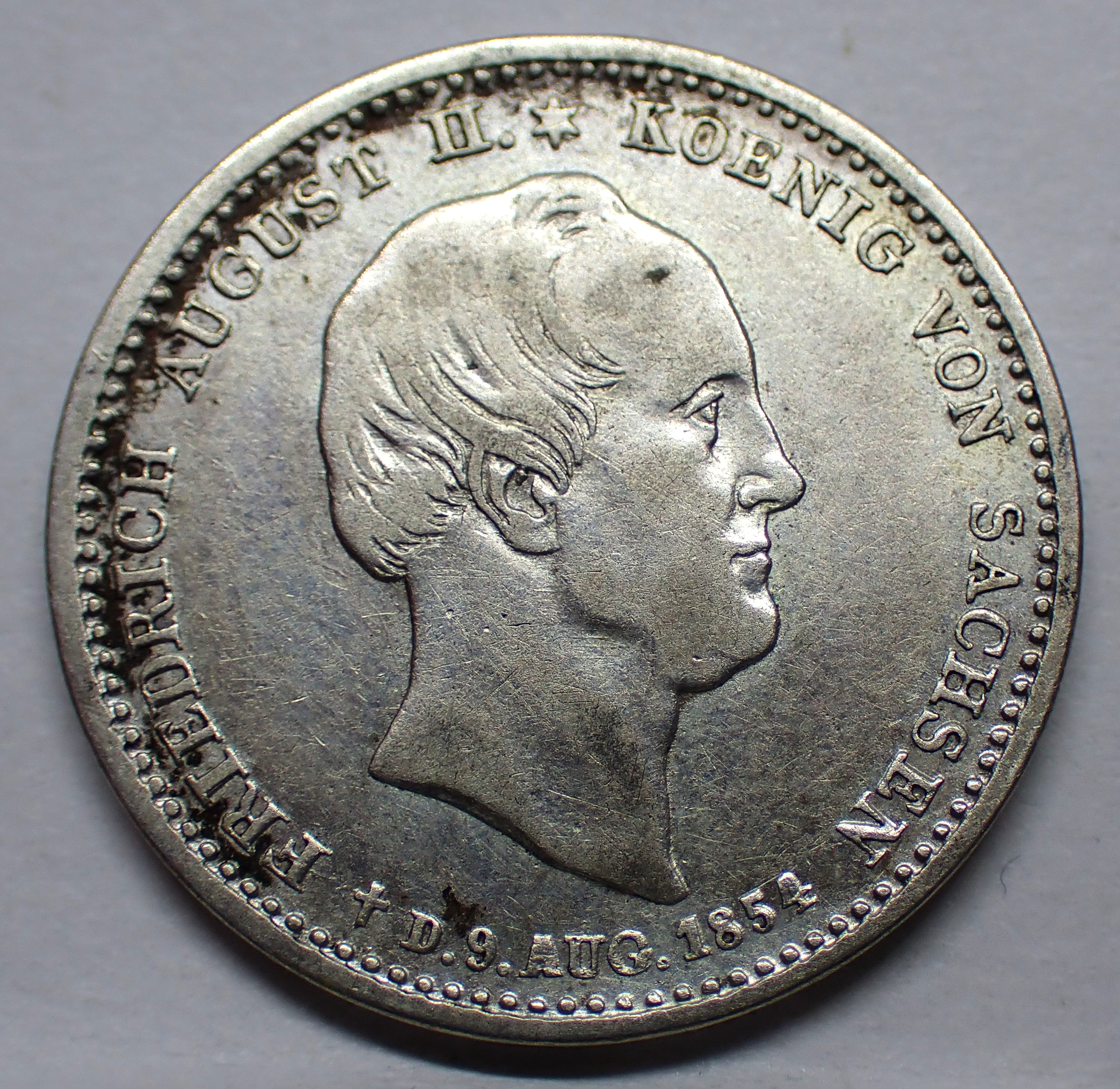
Coin on the death of Frederick Augustus II

During a journey in Tyrol, he had an accident in Brennbüchel in which he fell in front of a horse that stepped on his head. On 9 August 1854, he died in the Gasthof Neuner. He was buried on 16 August in the Katholische Hofkirche of Dresden. In his memory, the Dowager Queen Maria arranged to establish the Königskapelle (King's Chapel) at the accident place, which was consecrated one year later, some of the last members of the Saxon royal family, including Maria Emanuel, Margrave of Meissen, are buried beside the chapel.

== Marriages ==
In Vienna on 26 September 1819 (by proxy) and again in Dresden on 7 October 1819 (in person), Frederick Augustus married firstly with the Archduchess Maria Caroline of Austria (Maria Karoline Ferdinande Theresia Josephine Demetria), daughter of Emperor Francis I of Austria. They had no children.

In Dresden on 24 April 1833 Frederick Augustus married secondly with the Princess Maria Anna of Bavaria (Maria Anna Leopoldine Elisabeth Wilhelmine), daughter of the King Maximilian I Joseph of Bavaria. Like his first marriage, this was childless.

The musician Theodor Uhlig (1822–1853) was an illegitimate son of Frederick Augustus.

Without legitimate issue, after his death Frederick Augustus was succeeded by his younger brother, Johann.

== Ancestry ==
Ancestors of Frederick Augustus II of Saxony

8. Augustus III of Poland
4. Frederick Christian, Elector of Saxony
9. Maria Josepha of Austria
2. Maximilian, Hereditary Prince of Saxony
10. Charles VII, Holy Roman Emperor
5. Maria Antonia of Bavaria
11. Maria Amalia of Austria
1. Frederick Augustus II of Saxony
12. Philip, Duke of Parma
6. Ferdinand, Duke of Parma
13. Louise-Élisabeth of France
3. Carolina of Parma
14. Francis I, Holy Roman Emperor
7. Maria Amalia of Austria
15. Maria Theresa of Austria

== Notes ==
Frederick Augustus II of Saxony House of Wettin Born: 18 May 1797 Died: 9 August 1854
Regnal titles
Preceded by Anthony	King of Saxony; 1836–1854	Succeeded by John
