= Frederick Christian, Elector of Saxony =

Elector of Saxony in 1763

Frederick Christian
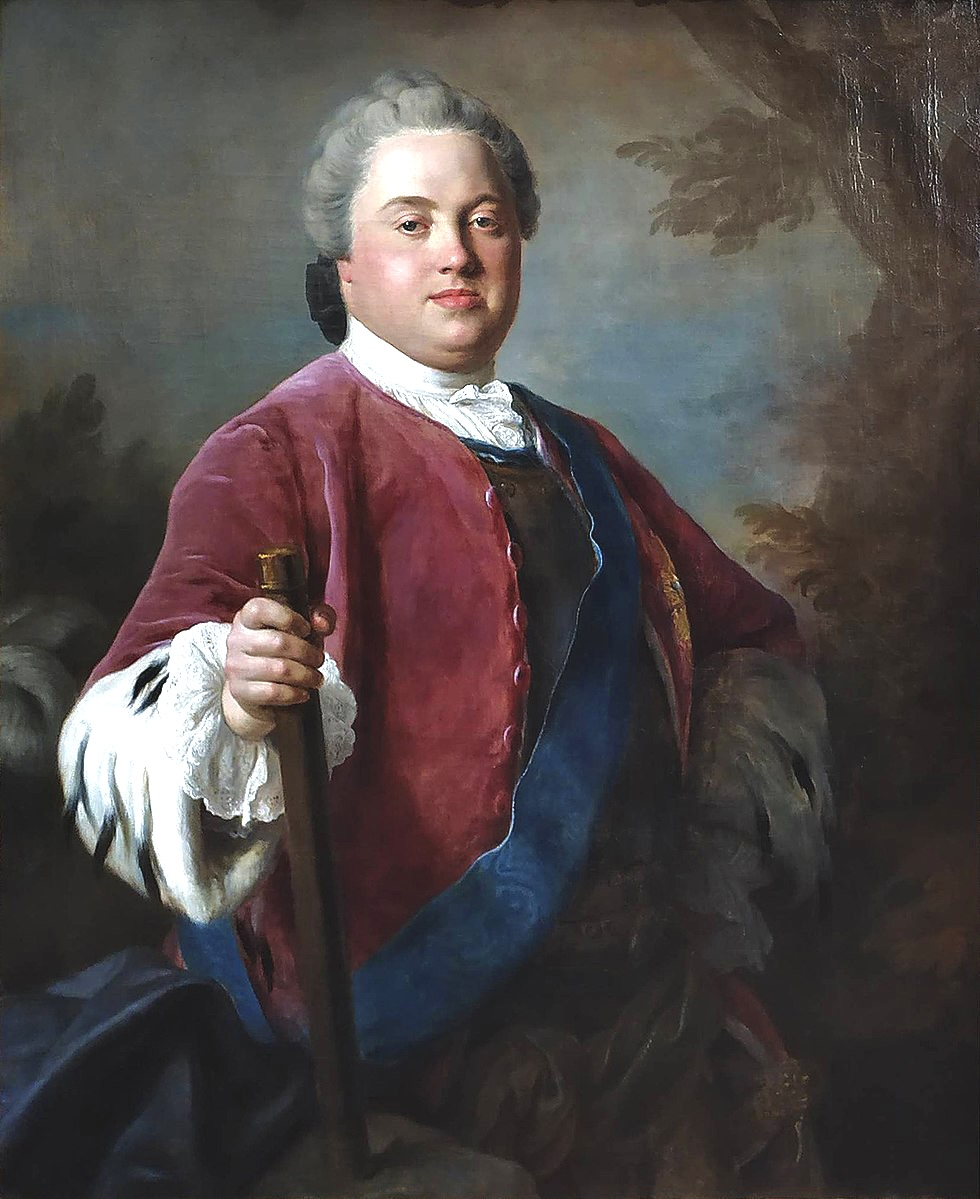
- Frederick Christian wearing the Polish Order of the White Eagle. Portrait by Pietro Rotari, c. 1755

Elector of Saxony
- Reign: 5 October – 17 December 1763
- Predecessor: Frederick Augustus II
- Successor: Frederick Augustus III
- Born: 5 September 1722; Dresden Castle, Dresden, Electorate of Saxony, Holy Roman Empire
- Died: 17 December 1763 (aged 41); Dresden Castle, Dresden, Electorate of Saxony, Holy Roman Empire
- Burial: Katholische Hofkirche
- Spouse: Duchess Maria Antonia of Bavaria (m. 1747)
- Issue more...: Frederick Augustus I, King of Saxony; Anthony, King of Saxony; Maria Amalia, Duchess of Zweibrücken; Prince Maximilian
Names
- Friedrich Christian Leopold Johann Georg Franz Xaver
- House: Wettin (Albertine line)
- Father: Frederick Augustus II, Elector of Saxony and King of Poland
- Mother: Maria Josepha of Austria
- Religion: Roman Catholicism

Frederick Christian (German: Friedrich Christian; 5 September 1722 – 17 December 1763) was the Prince-Elector of Saxony for 73 days in 1763. He was a member of the House of Wettin. He was the third but eldest surviving son of Frederick Augustus II, Prince-Elector of Saxony and King of Poland (as Augustus III), by his wife, Maria Josepha of Austria.

== Early life ==
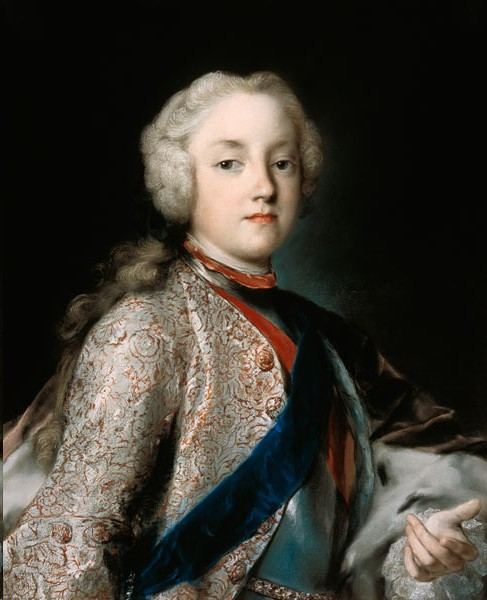
Frederick Christian c. 1735, by Rosalba Carriera.

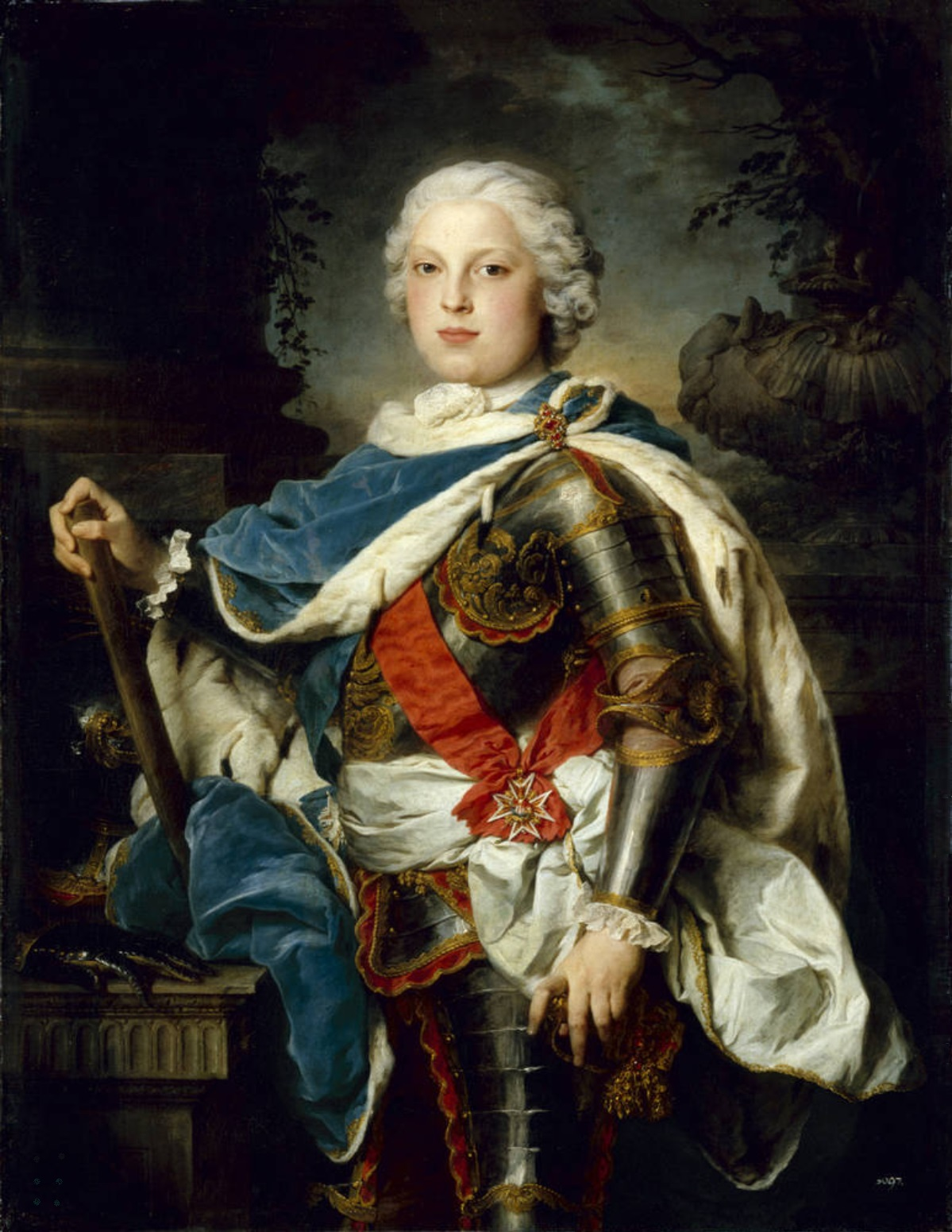
A young Frederick Christian by Pierre Subleyras, c. 1739

A weak child since his birth, he suffered paralysis in one foot and was dependent on wheelchairs early in life. In a well-known portrait, which shows his Wettin and Wittelsbach relatives around him, he appears in his wheelchair. Today, this painting is shown in the Nymphenburg Palace. His mother tried repeatedly to induce him to take monastic vows and renounce his succession rights in favour of his younger brothers, but he refused.

The early deaths of his two older brothers, Frederick Augustus (1721), who was stillborn, and Joseph Augustus (1728), made him the heir to the throne. When his father died, on 5 October 1763, Frederick Christian succeeded him as elector.

Even before, Frederick Christian had written in his diary: "Princes exist for their subjects, not subjects for their princes. His subjects' wealth, public credit and a well-standing army make up the true happiness of a prince," thereby openly declaring himself open to the ideas of the Age of Enlightenment. He was also known for his considerable musical talent.

== Marriage ==
In Munich on 13 June 1747 (by proxy) and again in Dresden on 20 June 1747 (in person), Frederick Christian married his cousin Maria Antonia of Bavaria. Like him, she was exceptionally talented in music and the couple had nine children.

== Reign as Elector ==
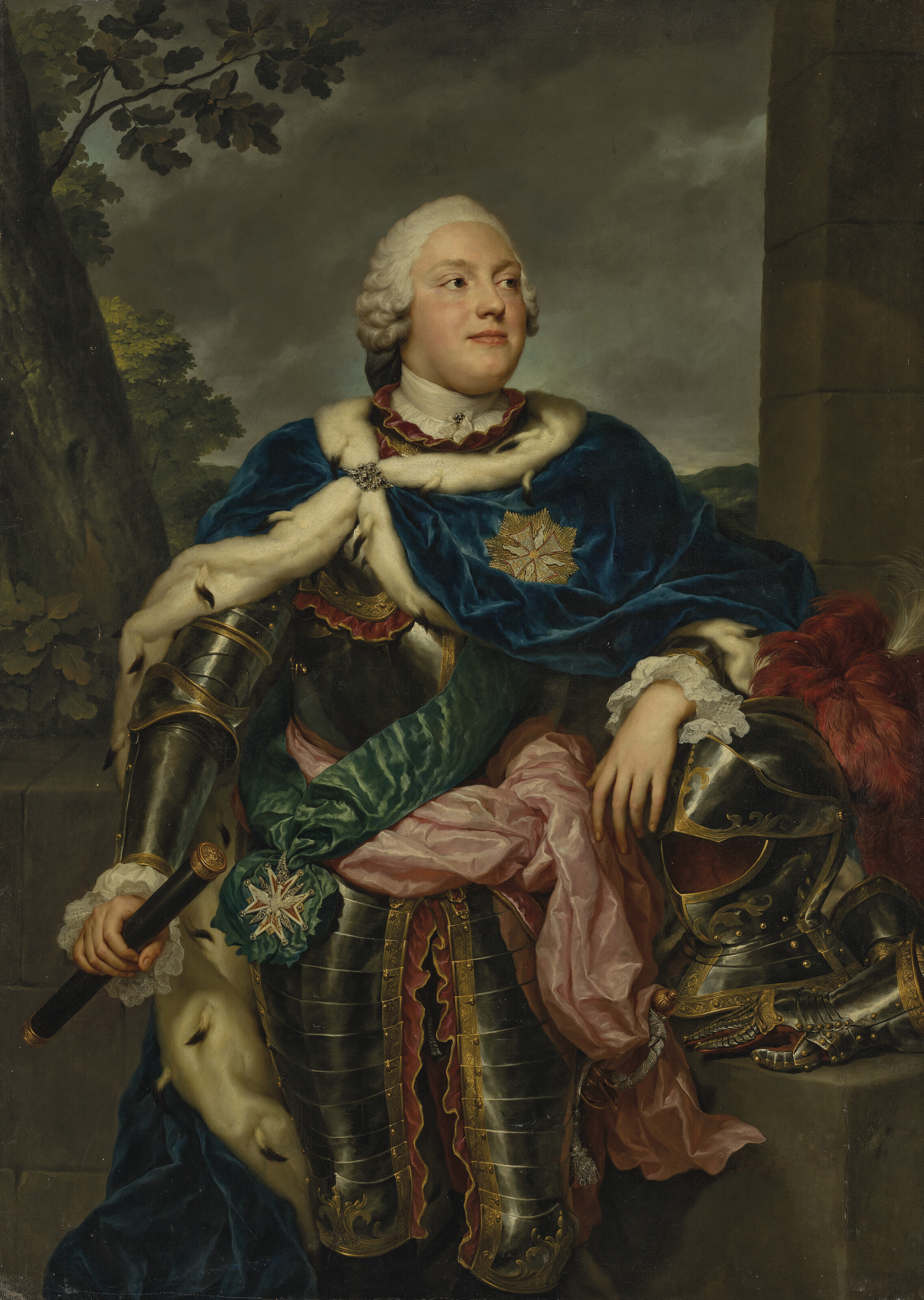
Portrait by Anton Raphael Mengs, c. 1752

One of his first acts as elector was the dismissal of the extremely unpopular prime minister, the Count Heinrich von Brühl, who had plunged Saxony into crisis, first with his failed economic policy, but particularly by his catastrophic foreign policy, which caused the electorate to become involved in the Seven Years' War.

He began to reconstruct the wrecked finances of his country through his "Rétablissements": reforms of the policies of the electorate states. Through economic reconstruction, he gave new life to the devastated and plundered land which his predecessors had left him. Also introduced were measures to pare down the expenses of the court, and to simplify administration in accordance with principles of economy. Most members of his government, such as Thomas von Fritsch of Leipzig, Friedrich Ludwig Wurmb, and Christian Gotthelf Gutschmied had middle-class origins.

After a reign of only 74 days, Frederick Christian died of smallpox. He was buried in the Hofkirche of Dresden.

Because Frederick Christian's eldest son Frederick Augustus III was a minor, his brother Francis Xavier and the Dowager Electress Maria Antonia took the joint regency of the electorate until the boy's majority.

== Issue ==
1. A son (9 June 1748)
2. Frederick Augustus I of Saxony (23 December 1750 – 5 May 1827) married Amalie of Zweibrücken-Birkenfeld, had issue
3. Karl Maximilian Maria Anton Johann Nepomuk Aloys Franz Xavier Januar (b. Dresden, 24 September 1752 – d. Dresden, 8 September 1781) died unmarried
4. Joseph Maria Ludwig Johann Nepomuck Aloys Gonzaga Franz Xavier Januar Anton de Padua Polycarp (26 January 1754 – 25 March 1763) died in childhood
5. Anton of Saxony (27 December 1755 – 6 June 1836) married Maria Carolina of Savoy, no issue; married Maria Theresa of Austria, no surviving issue
6. Maria Amalia of Saxony (26 September 1757 – 20 April 1831) married Karl II August of Zweibrücken and had issue
7. Maximilian of Saxony (13 April 1759 – 3 January 1838) married Princess Caroline of Parma and had issue; married secondly Maria Luisa of Bourbon-Parma without issue
8. Theresia Maria Josepha Magdalena Anna Antonia Walburga Ignatia Xaveria Augustina Aloysia Fortunata (27 February 1761 – 26 November 1820) died unmarried, Order of Queen Maria Luisa
9. Stillborn son (1762).

== Ancestry ==
Ancestors of Frederick Christian, Elector of Saxony

8. John George III, Elector of Saxony
4. Augustus II of Poland
9. Anna Sophie of Denmark
2. Augustus III of Poland
10. Christian Ernst, Margrave of Brandenburg-Bayreuth
5. Christiane Eberhardine of Brandenburg-Bayreuth
11. Sophie Louise of Württemberg
1. Frederick Christian, Elector of Saxony'
12. Leopold I, Holy Roman Emperor
6. Joseph I, Holy Roman Emperor
13. Eleonore Magdalene of Neuburg
3. Maria Josepha of Austria
14. John Frederick, Duke of Brunswick-Calenberg
7. Wilhelmine Amalie of Brunswick-Lüneburg
15. Benedicta Henrietta of the Palatinate

== See also ==
- History of Saxony
- Rulers of Saxony
- Dresden Castle – Residence of Frederick Christian

== Notes and references ==
| Preceded by Frederick Augustus II | Elector of Saxony; 1763 | Succeeded by Frederick Augustus III |
