= Duchess Maria Antonia of Bavaria =

Electress of Saxony in 1763

Maria Antonia of Bavaria
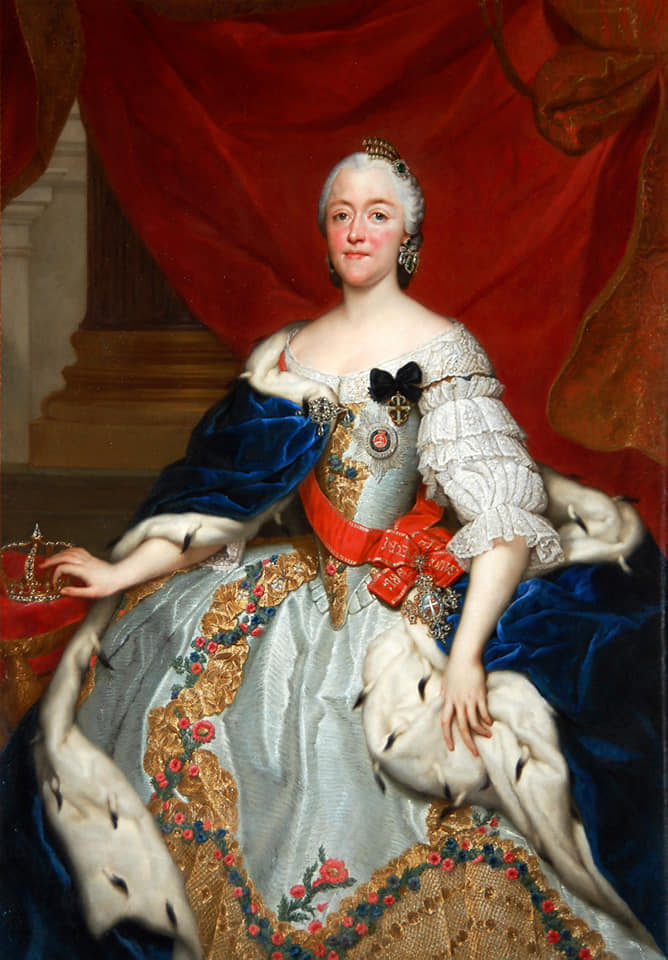
- Portrait by Anton Raphael Mengs, 1752

Electress consort of Saxony
- Tenure: 5 October 1763 – 17 December 1763
- Born: 18 July 1724; Nymphenburg Palace, Munich
- Died: 23 April 1780 (aged 55); Dresden
- Burial: Katholische Hofkirche
- Spouse: Frederick Christian, Elector of Saxony (m. 1747; died 1763)
- Issue: Frederick Augustus I of Saxony; Anthony, King of Saxony; Princess Maria Amalia of Saxony; Maximilian, Hereditary Prince of Saxony
Names
- Maria Antonia Walpurgis Symphorosa
- House: Wittelsbach
- Father: Charles VII, Holy Roman Emperor
- Mother: Maria Amalia of Austria

Maria Antonia of Bavaria (18 July 1724 – 23 April 1780) was a German princess, composer, singer, harpsichordist and patron of the arts, known particularly for her operas: Il trionfo della fedeltà ("The triumph of fidelity") and Talestri, regina delle amazoni ("Talestri, queen of the Amazons"). She was Electress of Saxony as the wife of Frederick Christian, Elector of Saxony. Following the latter's death in 1763, she became the Regent of Saxony for their son Frederick Augustus I of Saxony.

== Family and background ==
Baptized Maria Antonia Walpurgis Symphorosa, she was born at Nymphenburg Palace in Munich to Archduchess Maria Amalia of Austria and Elector Karl Albert of Bavaria. Throughout her life, she received an outstanding education, particularly in the arts, including painting and writing poetry, as well as music.

She was the second of seven children of the Elector and his wife.

== Marriage ==
A marriage by proxy took place in Munich on 13 June 1747 to Frederick Christian, the heir to the Electorate of Saxony, while they would wed in person in Dresden on 20 June 1747. That same year she became a member of the Accademia dell'Arcadia of Rome, a significant institution in operatic reform. With her marriage, she moved to Dresden. She had nine children with Friedrich Christian, seven of whom survived infancy.

== Regency ==
She left Dresden during the Seven Years' War and took refuge in Prague and Munich, but returned at her husband’s accession to the throne in 1763. He died ten weeks later, and their son Frederick Augustus succeeded him. Her son being a minor, she served as joint regent with her brother-in-law Franz Xavier until her son reached legal majority in 1768. During her regency, she opposed her co-regent's act to give up her son's claim to the throne of Poland in 1765. She also founded a textile factory in 1763 and a brewery in 1766.

== Musical training and composition ==
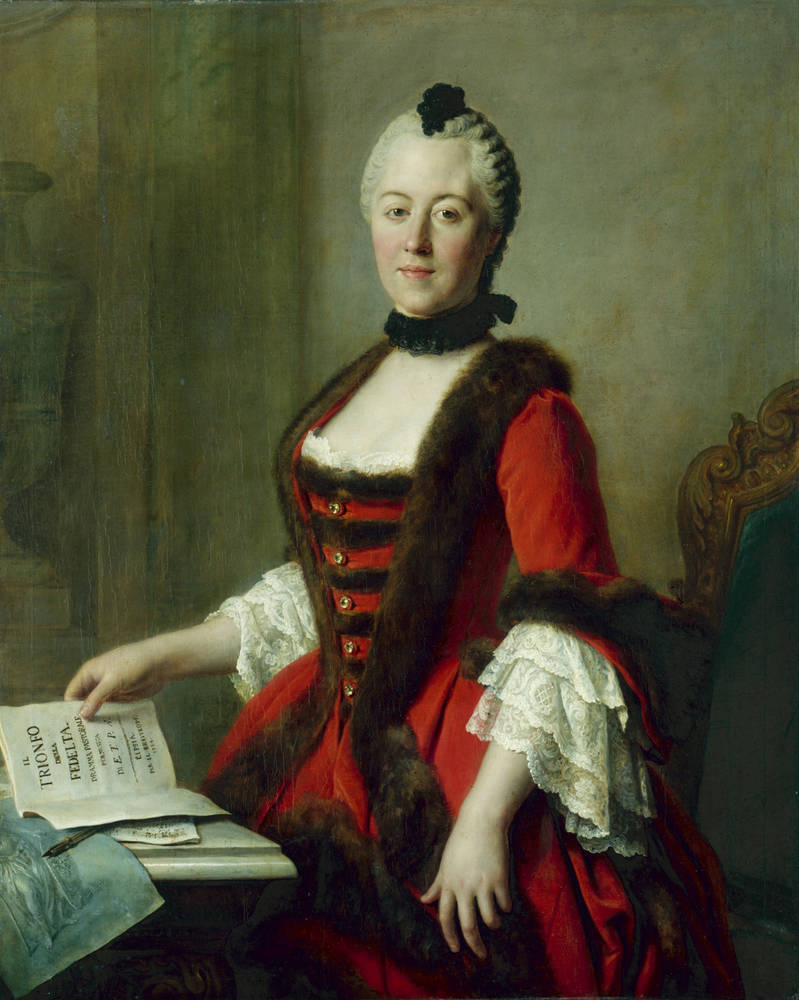
Portrait of Maria Antonia by Pietro Rotari

While in Munich, Maria Antonia studied music with renowned opera composers Giovanni Battista Ferrandini and Giovanni Porta. After moving to Dresden, she continued her studies with Giovanni Alberto Ristori, Nicola Porpora and Johann Adolph Hasse. Indeed, opera played a major part throughout Maria Antonia's life. The court of Munich celebrated her birth with a performance of the opera Amadis de Grecia by Pietro Torri. Her betrothal to Friedrich Christian was likewise celebrated with opera performances, including Hasse's La Spartana generosa, sets by Bibiena, and Gluck's opera Le nozze d'Ercole e d'Ebe. Shortly after moving to Dresden, she penned the libretto for Hasse's oratorio, La conversione di Sant'Agostino (1750), in addition to her composing work. Her own compositional style shows a strong affinity for that of Hasse, especially his conception of opera seria. She also performed actively as a singer and keyboard player in court performances, including leading roles in both of her operas. In addition to her two operas, a number of arias, a pastorale, intermezzos, meditations and motets are attributed to her.

=== Talestri ===
The Amazon queen Thalestris appears in numerous works from Greek mythology, and, like many stories and mythic sequences, it became a frequent subject for works throughout the late Middle Ages and beyond. The French poet Gautier de Coste LaCalprenède revived the tale in the novel Cassandre (1644–1650), though the story was altered from the semi-historical account involving Alexander the Great to one involving Orontes, Prince of the Massagetes, as the male foil to Talestris.

Several operas took on the same principle over the next century, with Maria Antonia crafting her own libretto and music. The plot centers on Talestris' relationship with a Scythian ruler, Orontes, as in LaCalprenède's version. In addition to the title character, two other prominent characters are women: Antiope, her advisor who also falls in love with a Scythian man, Learchus; and Tomiris, the high priestess of Diana, who is — as revealed near the end of the opera — the mother of Orontes. Ultimately, the plot ends happily, with each couple united and war averted, as the Scythians and Amazons manage to peacefully co-exist. The depiction of the benevolent, thoughtful ruler Talestris coming to be a political leader suggests the possibility that the opera is a semi-autobiographical rendering of Maria Antonia herself.

== Critical reception ==
Though published using the pseudonym ETPA, standing for Ermelinda Talea Pastorella Arcadia, Maria Antonia's operas were successfully published by Breitkopf and enjoyed warm reviews both in their premieres at the court theater, which she sang in, and also throughout other European cities. Music critic Charles Burney praised her opera and her singing in his 1773 work, The Present State of Music in Germany, the Netherlands and United Provinces. Also of note, the philosopher and music theorist Antonio Eximeno y Pujades included an aria from Talestri in his 1774 treatise Dell' origine e delle regole della musica, putting her in the company of five other selected composers: Palestrina, Nanini, Clari, Pergolesi, and Corelli.

Although her music is treated somewhat more broadly with less musical analysis, the entire treatise is used to model compositional techniques, implying a high regard for her work by Antonio Eximeno y Pujades, and presumably other contemporaries.

== Works ==
- Il trionfo della fedeltà: opera, libretto by Maria Antonia (Dresden, summer 1754)
- Talestri, regina delle amazzoni: opera, libretto by Maria Antonia (Nymphenburg, 6 February 1760)

== Discography ==
- Talestri, regina delle amazzoni: Dramma per musica. CD, Berlin: Folkert Uhde, 1999 and 2003

== Ancestry ==
Ancestors of Duchess Maria Antonia of Bavaria

8. Ferdinand Maria, Elector of Bavaria
4. Maximilian II Emanuel, Elector of Bavaria
9. Henriette Adelaide of Savoy
2. Charles VII, Holy Roman Emperor
10. John III Sobieski
5. Theresa Kunegunda Sobieska
11. Marie Casimire d'Arquien
1. Maria Antonia of Bavaria
12. Leopold I, Holy Roman Emperor
6. Joseph I, Holy Roman Emperor
13. Eleonore Magdalene of Neuburg
3. Maria Amalia of Austria
14. John Frederick, Duke of Brunswick
7. Wilhelmine Amalie of Brunswick-Lüneburg
15. Benedicta Henrietta of the Palatinate

Maria Antonia of Bavaria House of Wittelsbach Born: 18 July 1724 Died: 23 April 1780
German royalty
Vacant Title next held by Maria Josepha of Austria	Electress consort of Saxony; 5 October 1763 – 17 December 1763	Vacant Title last held by Amalie of Zweibrücken-Birkenfeld
