= Princess Maria Anna of Saxony =

Grand Duchess of Tuscany from 1824 to 1832

Maria Anna of Saxony
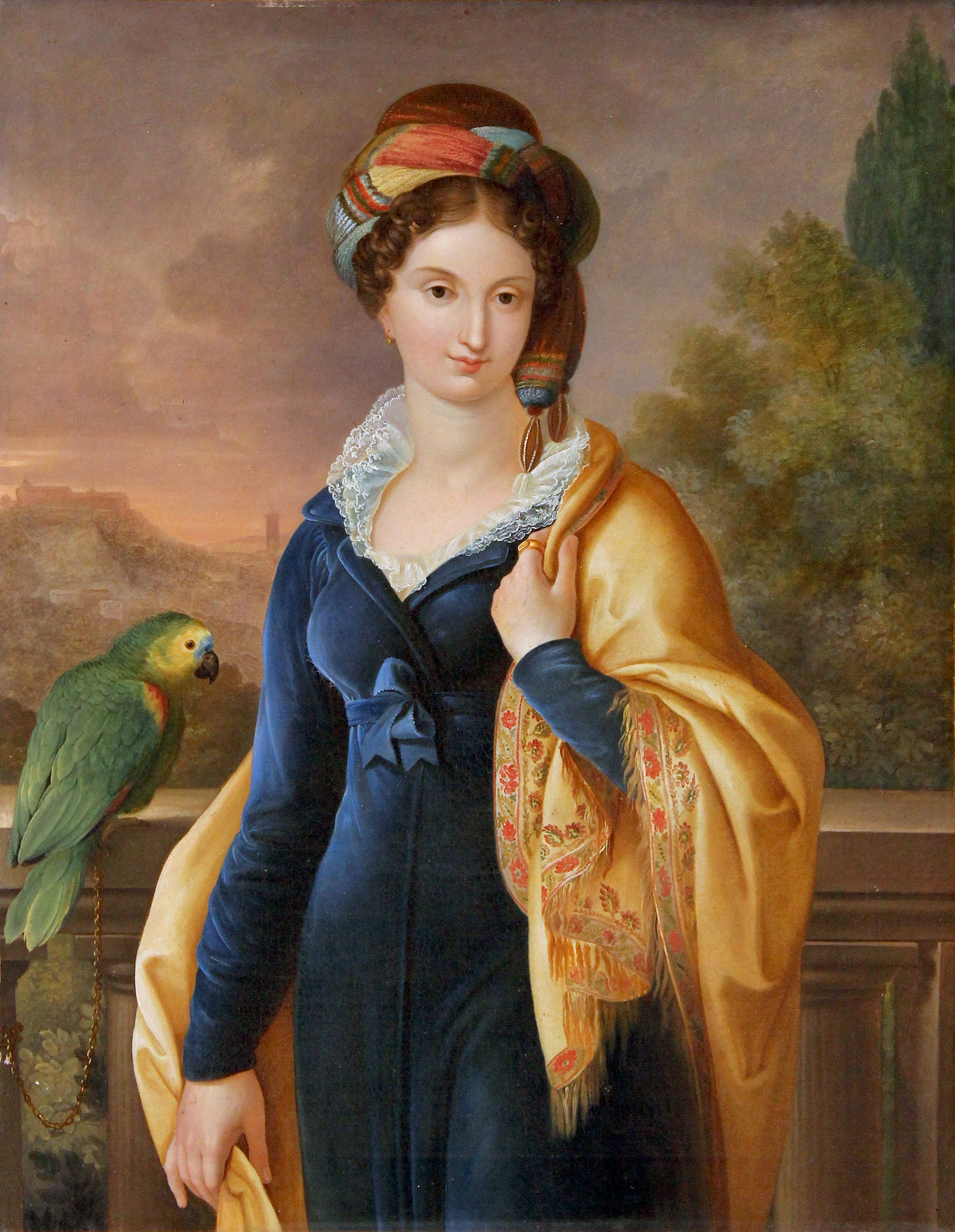
- Portrait of Marianna by Gaspero Martellini, 1821

Grand Duchess consort of Tuscany
- Tenure: 18 June 1824 – 24 March 1832
- Born: 15 November 1799; Dresden
- Died: 24 March 1832 (aged 32); Pisa
- Spouse: Leopold II, Grand Duke of Tuscany (m. 1817)
- Issue: Archduchess Caroline; Auguste Ferdinande, Princess of Bavaria; Archduchess Maximiliana
Names
- Maria Anna Carolina Josepha Vincentia Xaveria Nepomucena Franziska de Paula Franziska Johanna de Chantal Antonia Elisabeth Cunigunde Gertrud Leopoldina
- House: Wettin
- Father: Maximilian, Crown Prince of Saxony
- Mother: Princess Caroline of Parma

Marie Anna of Saxony (Maria Anna Carolina Josepha Vincentia Xaveria Nepomucena Franziska de Paula Franziska de Chantal Johanna Antonia Elisabeth Cunigunde Gertrud Leopoldina; 15 November 1799 – 24 March 1832) was a princess of Saxony. She became Grand Duchess of Tuscany by her marriage to Leopold II, Grand Duke of Tuscany.

== Family ==
Marie Anna was born in Dresden, one of the seven children of Maximilian of Saxony by his first wife Caroline of Bourbon-Parma.

Her father was a son of Frederick Christian, Elector of Saxony. Her mother was a daughter of Ferdinand, Duke of Parma. Through her mother, Maria Anna was also the great-granddaughter of Maria Theresa.

== Life ==
During her short life she showed a special interest for ancient paintings and classical poetry, acquiring the Liber Interitus by Horace for an unknown but extremely high price. She was inspired by Gnostic writings to write a short poet entitled Chuchotet d'Archont, published posthumously. Along with her husband she was the founding patron of the Istituto Statale della Ss. Annunziata, the first female boarding school in Florence set up to educate aristocratic and noble young ladies. She died in Italy of tuberculosis she passed onto Auguste, her only surviving daughter.

== Marriage and issue ==
Her husband's granddaughter Archduchess Luise of Austria described Maria Anna as a "highly nervous girl who was so terrified at the idea of meeting her unknown bridegroom that she refused to leave Dresden unless accompanied by her sister" Princess Maria Ferdinanda of Saxony. As her sister agreed to travel with her, Maria Anna duly married on 16 November 1817 the future Leopold II, Grand Duke of Tuscany, son of Ferdinand III, Grand Duke of Tuscany and his first wife Princess Luisa of Naples and Sicily. During the celebrations, Ferdinand became attached to Maria Anna's sister, and they were later married. Her sister Maria Ferdinanda thus became Maria Anna's stepmother-in-law.

They had three children, only one of whom lived to mature adulthood:

- Archduchess Carolina Augusta Elisabeth Vincentia Johanna Josepha of Austria (1822–1841)
- Archduchess Auguste Ferdinande of Austria (1825–1864)
- Archduchess Maria Maximiliana Thekla Johanna Josepha of Austria (1827–1834), died in childhood.

After Maria Anna's death at Pisa in 1832, her husband married Princess Maria Antonia of the Two Sicilies.

== Ancestry ==
Ancestors of Princess Maria Anna of Saxony

8. Augustus III of Poland
4. Frederick Christian, Elector of Saxony
9. Maria Josepha of Austria
2. Maximilian, Hereditary Prince of Saxony
10. Charles VII, Holy Roman Emperor
5. Maria Antonia of Bavaria
11. Maria Amalia of Austria
1. Princess Maria Anna of Saxony
12. Philip, Duke of Parma
6. Ferdinand, Duke of Parma
13. Louise Élisabeth of France
3. Carolina of Parma
14. Francis I, Holy Roman Emperor
7. Maria Amalia of Austria
15. Maria Theresa of Austria

== Sources ==
- Toscana, Luise von (1911). My Own Story. London: Ballantyne & Company LTD.

Princess Maria Anna of Saxony House of Wettin Born: 15 November 1799 Died: 24 March 1832
Italian royalty
Preceded by Maria Ferdinanda of Saxony	Grand Duchess consort of Tuscany; 1824–1832	Vacant Title next held by Maria Antonia of the Two Sicilies
