= Portrait of Maria Antonietta of Tuscany =

1836 painting by Giuseppe Bezzuoli

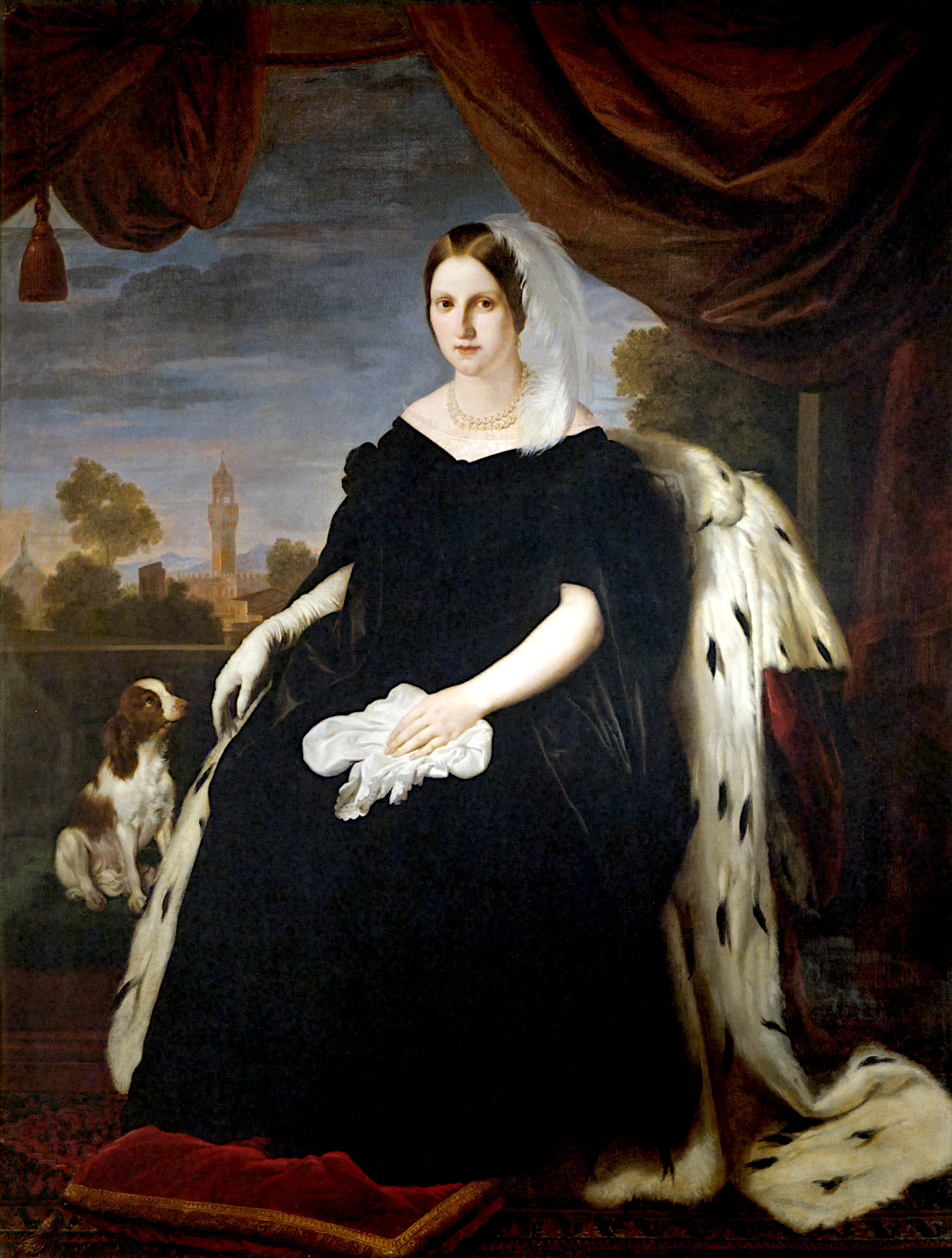

Portrait of Maria Antonietta of Tuscany is an 1836 oil on canvas painting by Giuseppe Bezzuoli, now in the Gallery of Modern Art in Florence. Shown aged 22, its subject is Maria Antonia, grand-duchess of Tuscany and second wife of Leopold II. In the left background is Palazzo Vecchio and the city of Florence, with a sunset and a dog in tribute to Antony van Dyck and Titian. His use of colour shows the influence of Ingres and there are some stylistic similarities to the work of Francesco Hayez.
