= Archduchess Caroline Augusta of Austria =

Austrian archduchess (1822–1841)

Archduchess Caroline Augusta
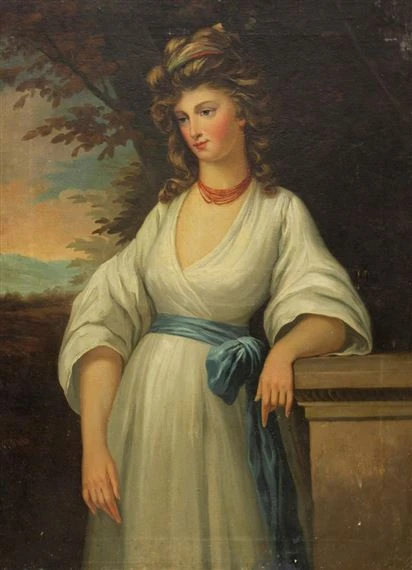
- Portrait by Gasparo Martellini, 1840
- Born: 19 November 1822; Florence, Grand Duchy of Tuscany
- Died: 5 October 1841 (aged 18); Florence, Grand Duchy of Tuscany
- Burial: Basilica of San Lorenzo, Florence
Names
- German:Maria Carolina Augusta Elisabetha Vincentia Johanna Josepha; Italian:Carolina Augusta Elisabetta Vincenza Giovanna Giuseppa
- House: House of Habsburg-Lorraine
- Father: Leopold II, Grand Duke of Tuscany
- Mother: Princess Maria Anna of Saxony
- Religion: Roman Catholicism

Archduchess Caroline Augusta of Austria (19 November 1822 – 5 October 1841) was a member of the Tuscan branch of the House of Habsburg-Lorraine by birth. As the eldest daughter of Leopold II, Grand Duke of Tuscany, she held the title of Archduchess of Austria and Princess of Tuscany.

== Biography ==
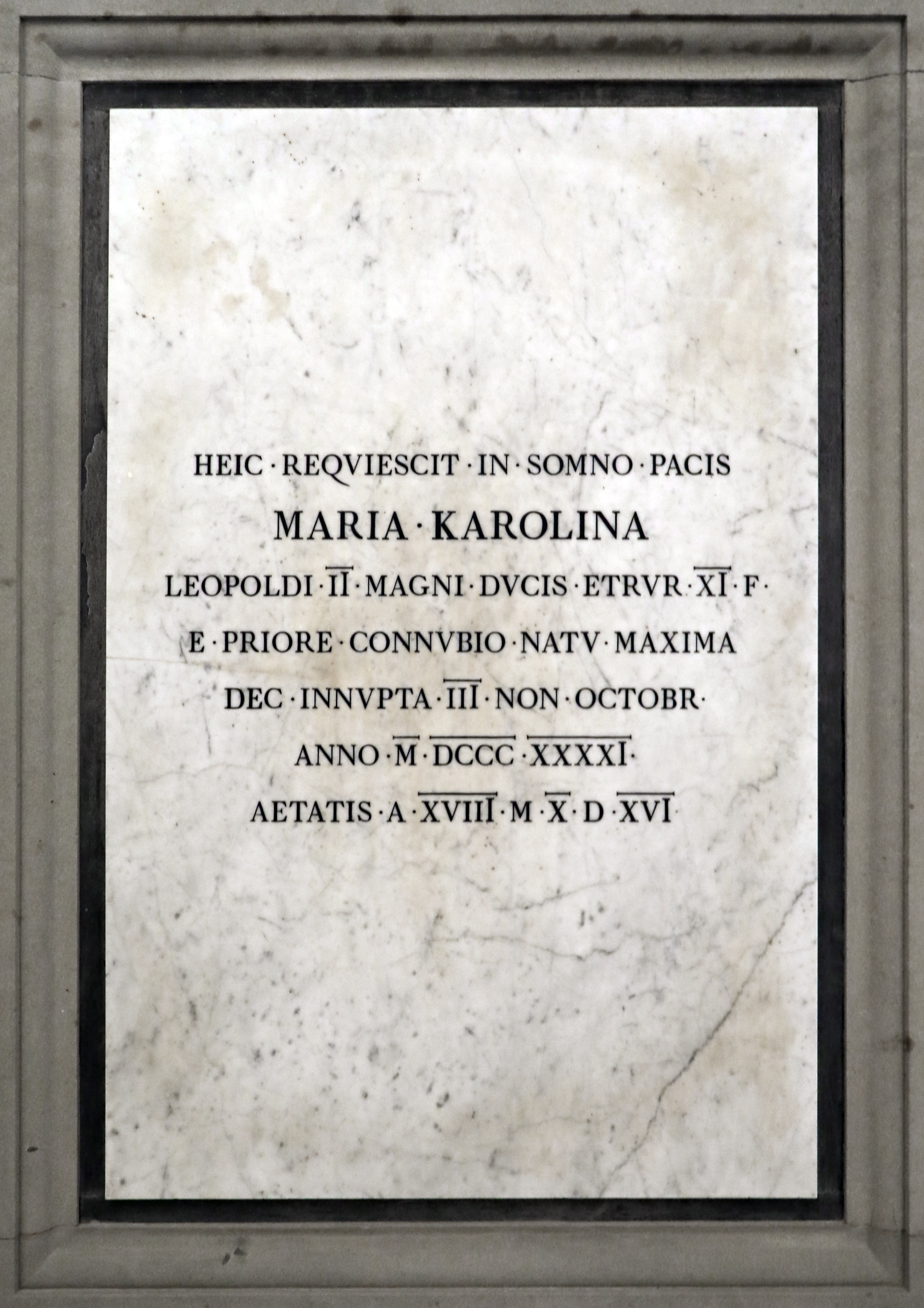
Death certificate of Archduchess Caroline.

Born on 19 November 1822 at the Palazzo Pitti in Florence, Caroline Augusta was the eldest daughter of Leopold II, Grand Duke of Tuscany, and Princess Maria Anna of Saxony. Following her mother's death in 1832, she grew up within the Florentine court. Caroline Augusta died unmarried in Florence on 5 October 1841 at age 18, and was buried in the Basilica of San Lorenzo.

== Ancestry ==
Ancestors of Archduchess Caroline Augusta of Austria

8. Leopold II, Holy Roman Emperor
4. Ferdinand III, Grand Duke of Tuscany
9. Maria Luisa of Spain
2. Leopold II, Grand Duke of Tuscany
10. Ferdinand I of the Two Sicilies
5. Princess Luisa of Naples and Sicily
11. Maria Carolina of Austria
1. Archduchess Caroline Augusta of Austria
12. Frederick Christian, Elector of Saxony
6. Maximilian, Hereditary Prince of Saxony
13. Maria Antonia Walpurgis of Bavaria
3. Princess Maria Anna of Saxony
14. Ferdinand, Duke of Parma
7. Princess Carolina of Parma
15. Maria Amalia, Duchess of Parma

== Bibliography ==
- Innocenti, Fulvio (2004). La stirpe dei Lorena: Granduchi di Toscana. Florence: Edizioni Polistampa. ISBN 978-8883047244.
- Kramer, Hans (1954). Die Toskana unter Leopold II: Bilder aus dem florentinischen Biedermeier. Vienna: Verlag Herder.
