= Istituto Statale della Santissima Annunziata =

Coordinates: 43.749172°N 11.247430°E

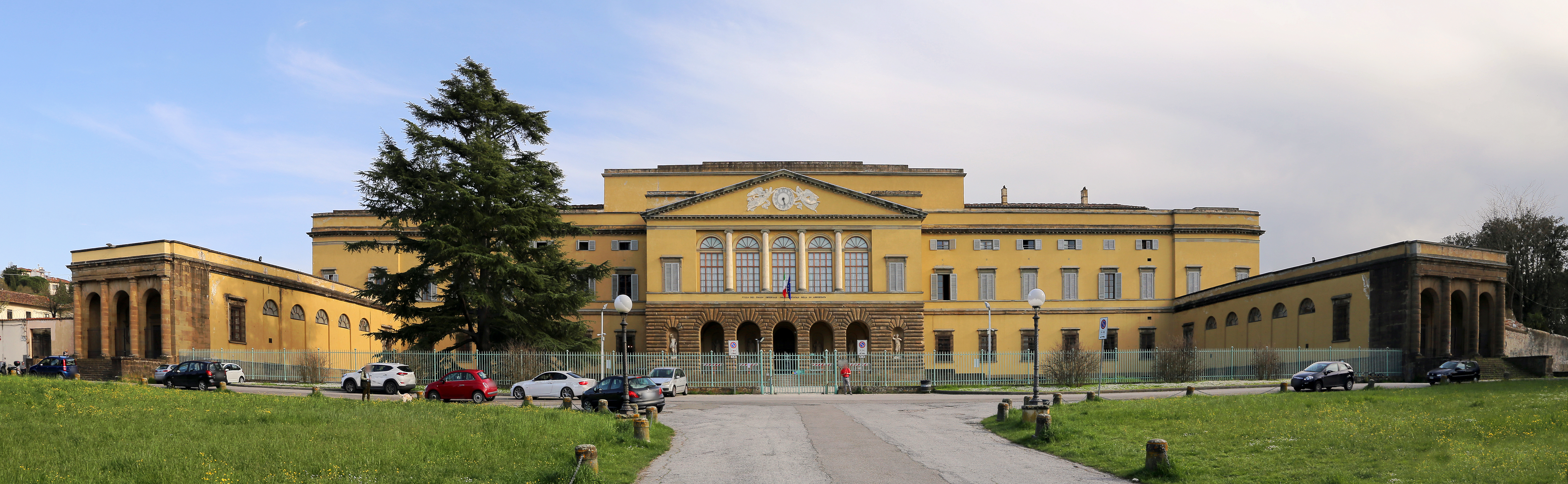
Villa del Poggio Imperiale

The Istituto Statale della Santissima Annunziata (English: Ss. Annunziata Boarding School), currently known as Educandato Statale Santissima Annunziata, was the first female boarding school to be founded in Florence, dating back to 1823. Originally intended for the daughters of Marquis Gino Capponi, the institute was created to educate aristocratic and noble girls, under the patronage of Maria Anna of Saxony and Leopold II of Tuscany. The original building was in the via della Scala, Florence. In 1865 it moved to the Villa del Poggio Imperiale overlooking Florence where it remains in situ today. The school has a brother establishment in Prato, the Collegio Cicognini, which was attended by cultural figures such as Curzio Malaparte and D'Annunzio.

The school is subdivided into a mixed Elementary, Middle, and Upper School. The Elementary school is an Italian-German school, teaching children in Italian, German and English. The Middle school teaches children predominantly in Italian and English, with the introduction of Latin and the option of Ancient Greek.

The Upper School, which is five years, is subdivided into Scientific, Linguistic, and European Classic schools. Students start at 14 years old. The Linguists, focusses on German, Italian and English as well as the core subjects. Whilst the Scientific, promotes the sciences; Biology, Physics, Chemistry, Geology, Philosophy, History. Whereas the European Classic, orientated towards Law, Economics, Italian, German, Ancient Greek and Latin. The boarding is still private but follows the more demanding state curriculum.

As rooms are limited within the Medici house boarding is reserved for only for approximately 80 girls. Girls come predominantly from all over Italy but nevertheless, there are few international students. Girls are called "Poggioline".

== Notable alumni ==
- Dacia Maraini – Italian writer
- Marie-José of Belgium – last Queen of Italy
- Edda Mussolini – eldest child of Benito Mussolini

== See also ==
- Cicognini National Boarding School
- Villa del Poggio Imperiale
