= Princess Maria Antonia of the Two Sicilies =

Grand Duchess of Tuscany from 1833 to 1859

Maria Antonia of the Two Sicilies
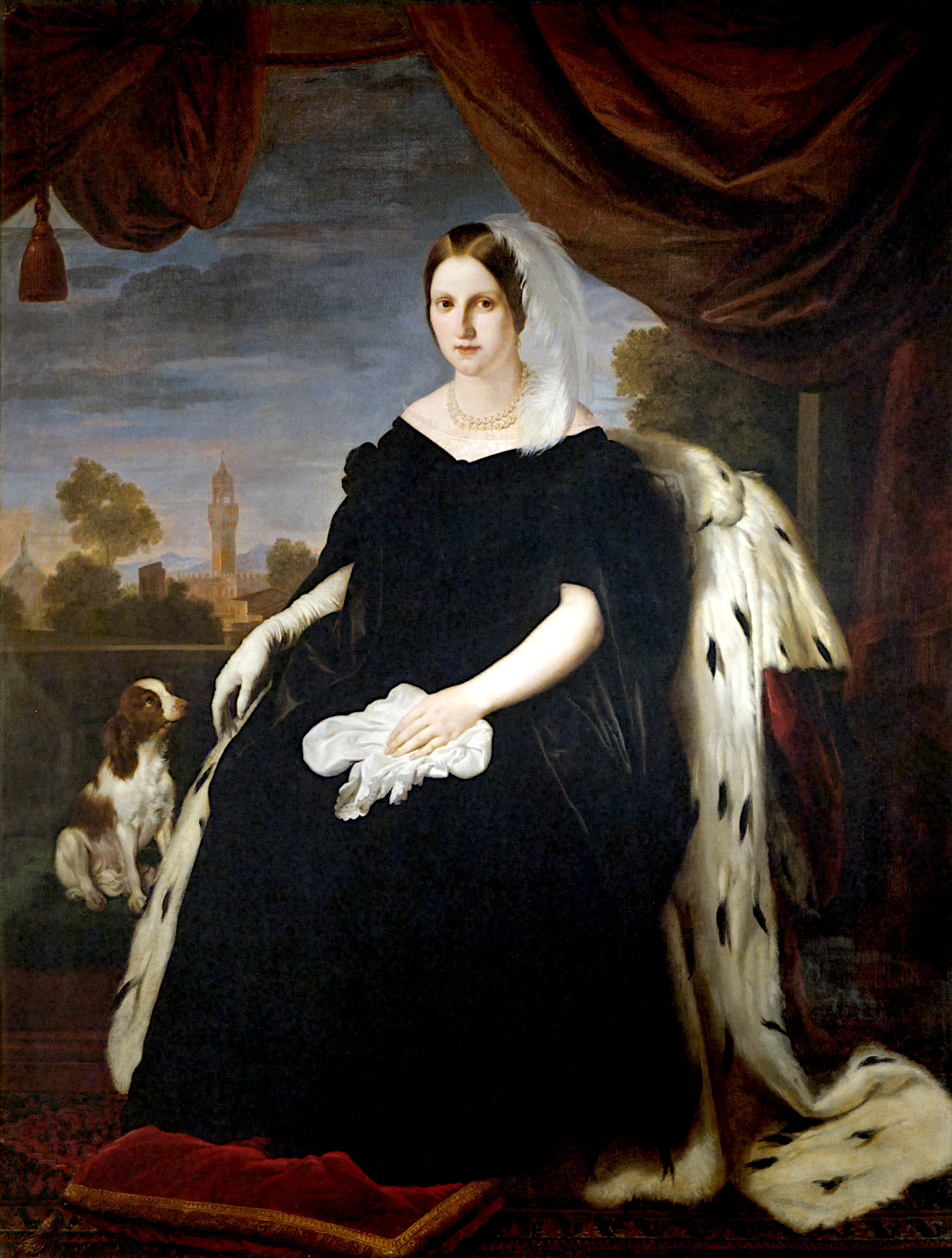
- Portrait of Maria Antonietta of Tuscany by Giuseppe Bezzuoli, 1836. Gallery of Modern Art, Florence.

Grand Duchess consort of Tuscany
- Tenure: 7 June 1833 – 21 July 1859
- Born: 19 December 1814; Royal Palace of Palermo, Kingdom of Sicily, Italy
- Died: 7 November 1898 (aged 83); Schloss Orth, Gmunden, Austria
- Burial: Imperial Crypt
- Spouse: Leopold II, Grand Duke of Tuscany (m. 1833; died 1870)
- Issue: Maria Isabella, Countess of Trapani; Ferdinand IV, Grand Duke of Tuscany; Archduke Karl Salvator; Maria Luisa, Princess of Isenburg-Büdingen; Archduke Ludwig Salvator; Archduke Johann Salvator
Names
- German: Maria Antonia Josepha Anna; Italian: Maria Antonietta Giuseppa Anna
- House: Bourbon-Two Sicilies
- Father: Francis I of the Two Sicilies
- Mother: María Isabella of Spain

Princess Maria Antonia of the Two Sicilies (Italian: Maria Antonia delle Due Sicilie) (19 December 1814 – 7 November 1898), was a princess of the Kingdom of the Two Sicilies by birth and Grand Duchess of Tuscany from 1833 to 1859 as the consort of Leopold II.

She is also known as Marie Antoinette of the Two Sicilies or Marie Antoinette of Tuscany, (Note: The name Maria Antonia appears only in official documents and public works dedicated to her, such as the ancient railway station of Florence and the current Piazza dell'Indipendenza. In the plaques of her pictorial and sculptural portraits present at Palazzo Pitti she is always indicated as "Maria Antonietta" (for example, in the catalog of Polo Museale Fiorentino). The latter name is the one by which she was always known to her family, friends and the people during her lifetime and is also the one with which she used to sign herself: in foreign correspondence she instead used the form Marie Antoinette, and in italian correspondence, the form Maria Antonietta.) since in the Bourbon and Habsburg-Lorraine families this form was used for princesses called Maria Antonia.

== Life ==
=== Early years ===
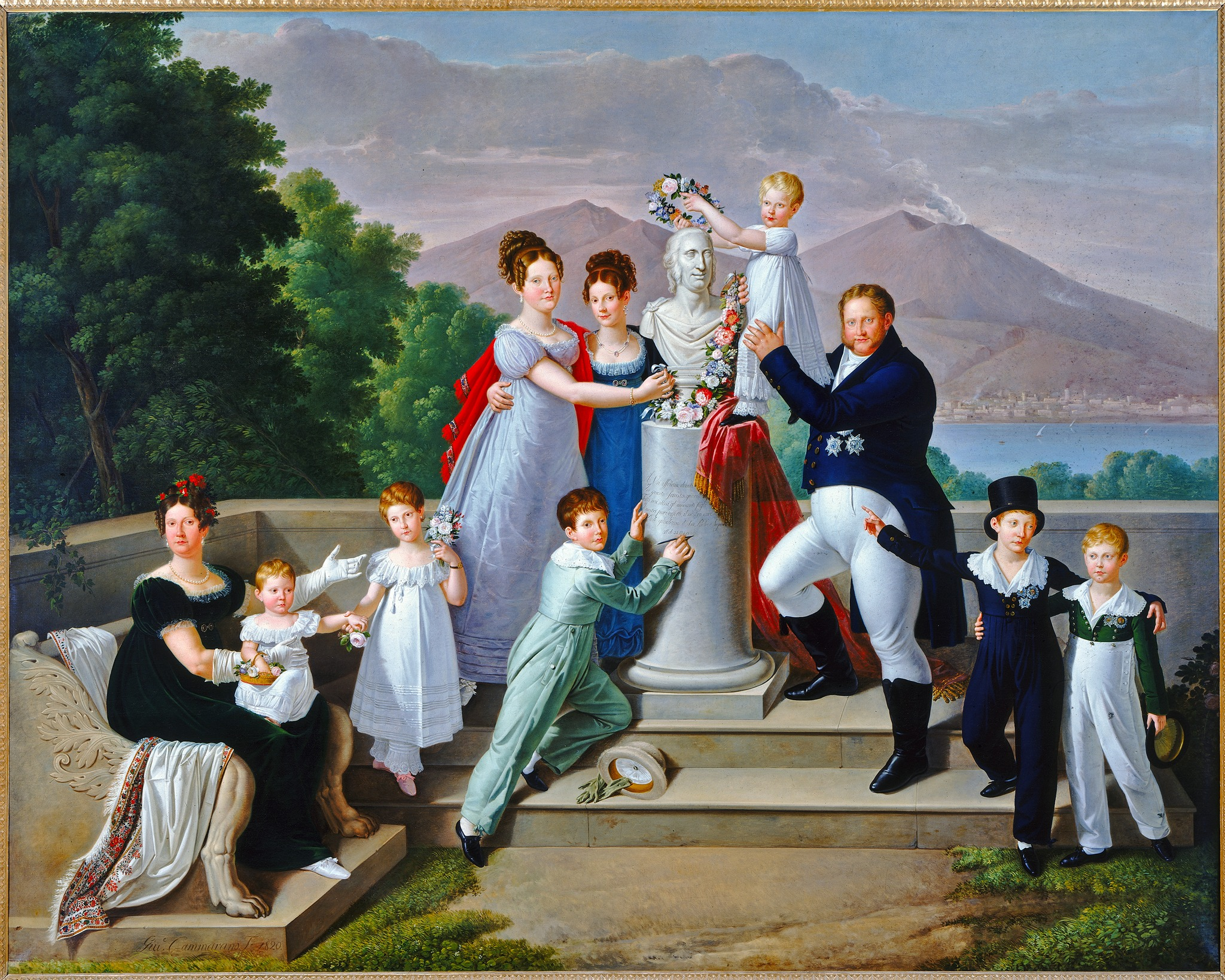
The family of Francis I, by Giuseppe Cammarano, 1820. Maria Antonia is the little girl on the left dressed in white, between her mother and her sister Louise Carlotta.

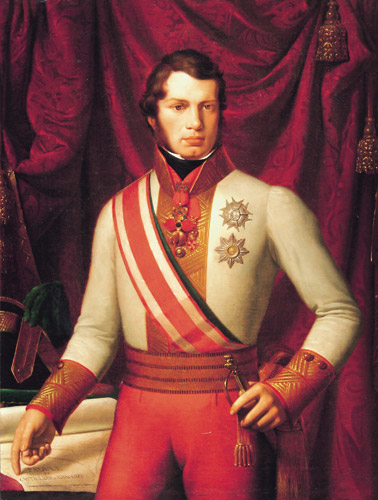
Leopold II, Grand Duke of Tuscany by Pietro Benvenuti, 1828 .

Maria Antonia was born at the Royal Palace of Palermo on 19 December 1814, the daughter of King Francis I of the Two Sicilies and his wife Maria Isabella of Spain. The girl was given the baptismal name Maria Antonia in honor of her great-aunt Marie Antoinette, the murdered sister of her paternal grandmother, Maria Carolina of Austria. When she was born, the Neapolitan court had already moved to Sicily due to the Napoleonic troops that had invaded the continental part of the kingdom. A few months after her birth, the royal family was able to return to the capital and recover their dominions thanks to the Congress of Vienna.

She was particularly close to her brother Ferdinand II, who affectionately called her "Totò", as well as her sister-in-law Maria Cristina of Savoy, who arrived at the Bourbon court in 1832. Maria Antonia and Maria Cristina, two years older, formed a sincere and deep friendship, but had to separate in view of the princess's wedding. After Maria Antonia's departure, Maria Cristina wrote: «It was a great affliction for me to have to separate from my sister-in-law Antonietta who is so good and with whom she had already established an intimate friendship».

=== Betrothal and marriage with Leopold II ===
On 24 March 1832 Grand Duchess Maria Anna of Tuscany (born a princess of Saxony), died of tuberculosis, without having managed to give a male heir to her husband, Grand Duke Leopold II of Tuscany. After almost a year of widowhood, the Grand Duke decided to remarry and the choice fell on the beautiful Neapolitan princess Maria Antonia. The two were first cousins because King Francis I of the Two Sicilies (father of Maria Antonia) and Grand Duchess Luisa Maria of Tuscany (mother of Leopold II), were siblings.

Prince Don Tommaso Corsini, on 21 May 1833, went as ambassador to Naples to stipulate the marriage contract. On 23 May, in the presence of the Neapolitan court, the Prince expressly asked for the hand of the young Princess, making three speeches: the first two were directed to King Ferdinand II, the bride's brother, and to Maria Isabella, the Queen Mother. The third speech was instead directed to Maria Antonia:

«The virtues with which Your Royal Highness is adorned, and which are admired in Her combined with the particular qualities of nature that heaven has lavished on her, made her rightly chosen by the Grand Duke of Tuscany, my lord in His bride. After having obtained the consent of the august brother the King, of the august Queen Mother of Your Royal Highness for this union, I have the honor of presenting myself to Your Highness, as a faithful interpreter of the feelings that animate my Sovereign and the All Tuscans. His Imperial and Royal Highness the Grand Duke rightly believes that in this beautiful knot he will find the fulfillment of her happiness, and his beloved Subjects already recognize in Your Highness a beneficent and affectionate sovereign. Your Highness can be sure of finding in the Grand Duke a wise and tender Groom, full of all the most beautiful social and family qualities, and neither the Tuscans will recognize that respectful obedience, and that constant attachment, which they already had for the august Grand Duchess Maria Luisa, aunt of Your Royal Highness. The sweetness of the climate, the pleasantness of the pleasant and well-cultivated countryside, the education of the People, the love that is nourished there for the fine arts and for good studies, will make Your Highness happy with that peaceful and happy stay. And those fervent wishes which are addressed to Heaven by the two Royal Families and by the Peoples subject to them for such a desired union will be fulfilled and crowned with the happiest success».

Princess Maria Antonia, in turn replied:

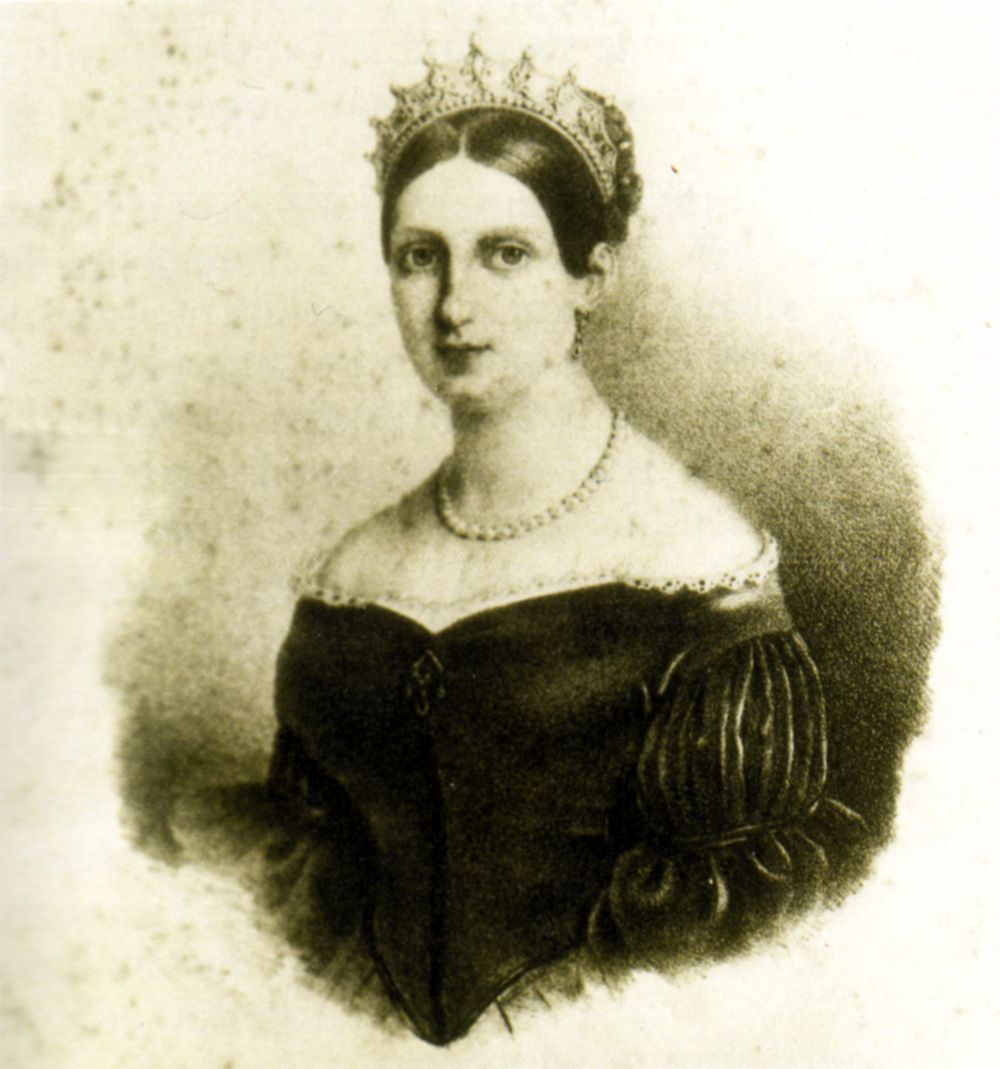
Princess Maria Antonia of the Two Sicilies, ca. 1836.

«I am grateful to the request for my hand made by you, Mr. Prince, in the name of your Sovereign the Grand Duke of Tuscany, whose merits and qualities do not allow me to hesitate in joining my consent to that of my King. Brother, and of the Queen my most august and dearest Mother; recognizing with gratitude that I owe only to Their affectionate care of her the happiness that this union promises me, which is all the more flattering to my heart, as it will not distance me much from my dear family. I sincerely desire to find in that of His Imperial and Royal Highness (of which I am going to be a part) the friendship that I already have for you, as I hope that by following the Family maxims that have been inspired in me from the first days of my age, I will be able to deserve the affection of the good and cultured Tuscan nation, so commendable for its attachment to its Sovereigns. I now declare to you, Lord Prince, that your Sovereign could not have chosen a person more suitable than you to fulfill the task entrusted to you, the virtues and eminent qualities that adorn you, and for which you have the esteem and trust of His Sovereign himself is so well deserved».

On 24 May 1833 Leopold II left Florence for Naples, where he made his official entry on 28 May alongside his future brother-in-law, who had welcomed him in Capua. Before the wedding, the court reserved some entertainment for the two engaged couples: a gala show at the Teatro di San Carlo and a visit to the ruins of Pompeii, which the Grand Duke particularly appreciated. On the morning of 7 June the very sumptuous wedding took place in the chapel of the royal palace: Maria Antonia was 18-years old, while Leopold II was seventeen years older. In private the young bride said to her husband: «How happy I am at this moment to be with you».

=== Grand Duchess of Tuscany ===
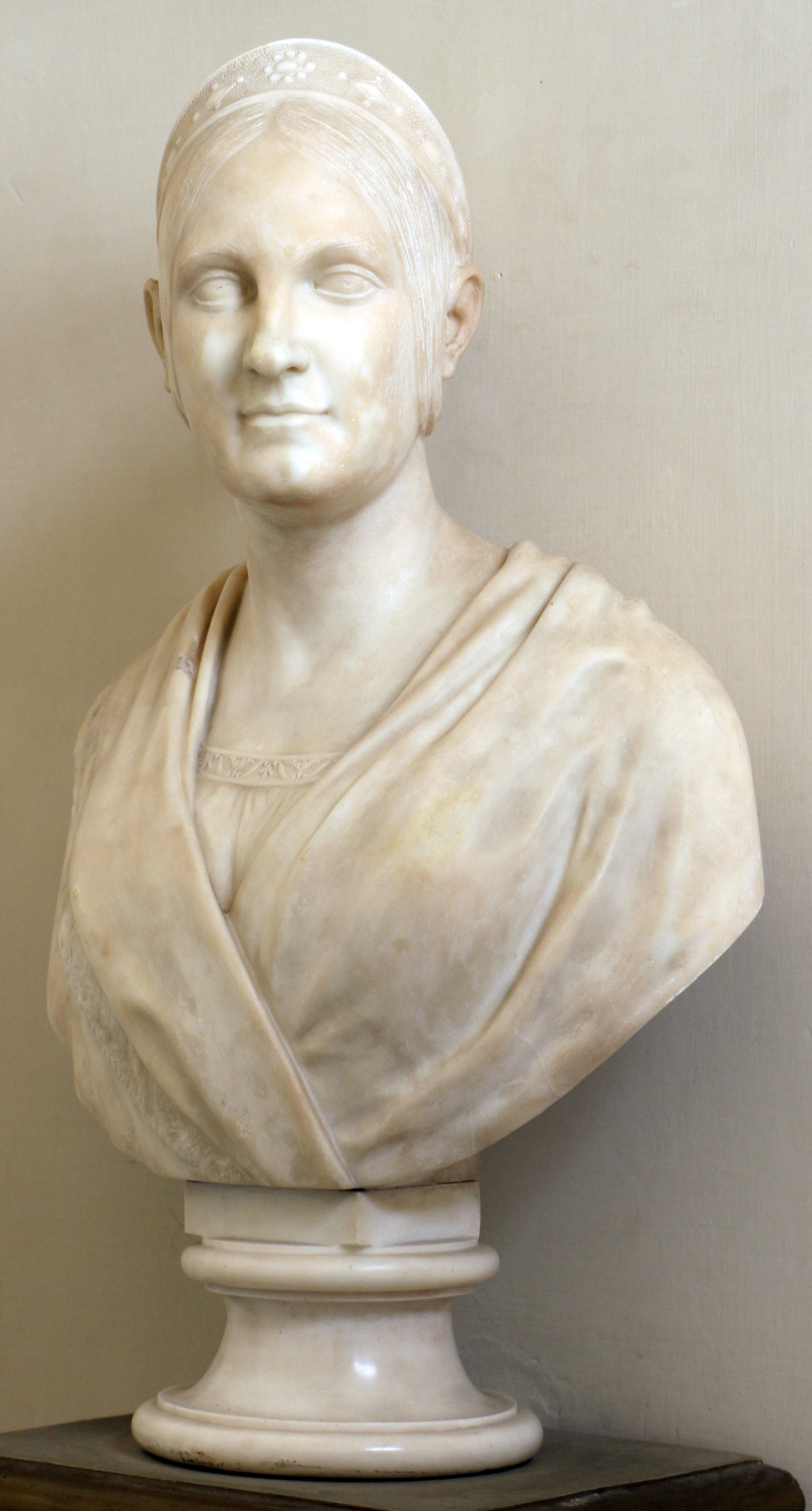
Grand Duchess Maria Antonia of Tuscany, bust by Ottavio Giovannozzi.

On 8 June 1833, in the late afternoon, the grand ducal couple left Naples and boarded the frigate "La Sirena" for Livorno. The journey was peaceful and Leopold II remembered that: «Antoinetta opened her beautiful heart, she poured out every treasure of hers: she spoke of her youth, of her pain at the death of her dear father. I told her about my family, and about her new home. She, who knew that I had loved the other wife, told me I had a portrait of her, cherished memories of her». Leopold II and Maria Antonia landed in Livorno on 14 June, welcomed by the Dowager Grand Duchess Maria Ferdinanda, by the Archduchess Maria Luisa (sister of the Grand Duke) and by Leopold II's three daughters from his first marriage: Carolina, Augusta and Maximiliana. The following day the newlyweds and their entourage headed to Pisa where they stayed for a few days and took part in the specially organized festive events. On 20 June, Maria Antonia made her official entry into Florence, where she was welcomed in a festive atmosphere with great cheers.

The new Grand Duchess was much admired by the Florentines for her beauty, (Note: Maria Antonia was described as a sculptural beauty with perfect lines, highlighted by the tight, low-cut dress she wore on the day of her official entry. Particular praise was given to her arms. The only flaw that was attributed to her was her small stature, although the young girl was very proportionate.) which is why Leopold II had asked her in marriage. In his memoirs, the Grand Duke described his beautiful and beloved bride thus: «On her face there was sweetness, intelligence [...]. Her sweet and sagacious eye, her serene forehead, a row of chosen pearls shining on her smile, her hair of golden splendor, her neck gently expanding over her shoulders, her arm, her hand of uncommon elegance, her every movement composed and dignified, appropriate words». Another factor that made Maria Antonia popular in the eyes of the Florentines was that she was an Italian princess and not a foreigner and the people hoped that she would soon give many heirs to Tuscany.

Initially Maria Antonia had some difficulty getting used to the "bourgeois" environment of Florence, so different from the Kingdom of the Two Sicilies: accustomed to a small and subordinate population and who often lived in poverty, the Grand Duchess did not understand why it was necessary give charity to well-dressed and clean people, such as those who formed the Florentine people. On one occasion the Grand Duchess, with her strong Neapolitan accent, complained that: «There are no poor people in Florence». In order to avoid creating a rift between Maria Antonia and the people, Leopold II took care to surround his wife with Florentine ladies; in particular, it was thanks to her first lady-in-waiting, Mrs. Adele Palagi, wife of the knight Palagi, colonel of the Grenadiers, that the Grand Duchess managed to integrate perfectly and love Florence as her second homeland, understanding her artistic and courteous side.

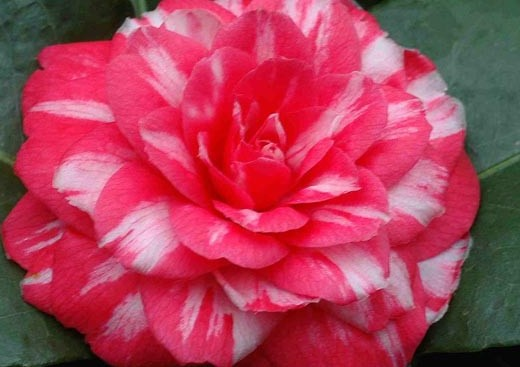
The Maria Antonietta camellia.

Maria Antonia, although not cultured, carried within her a natural love for the fine arts. She was a great patron, she welcomed artists into her palaces and often went to their studios as a private visitor. Among her protégés were the sculptor Giovanni Duprè and the musician Teodulo Mabellini. Marquis Cosimo Ridolfi, one of the major agronomists of her time, selected a new type of camellia which he called "Maria Antonietta" in honor of the Grand Duchess.

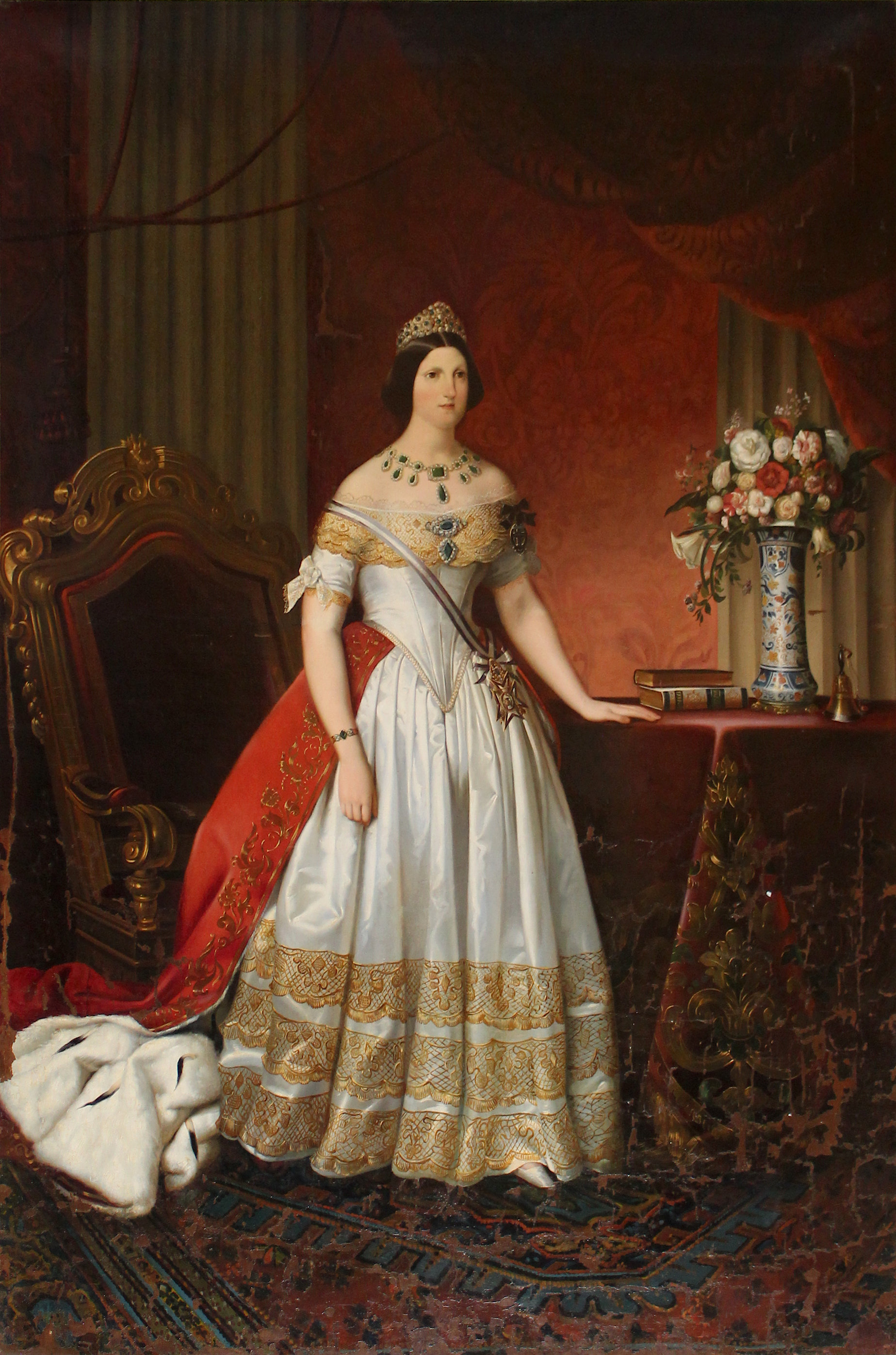
Grand Duchess Maria Antonia, by Carlo Morelli, 1840.

The Grand Duchess, educated with strict religious principles, was a fervent and devout Catholic. She developed in a particular way the cult of Saint Philomena of Rome, a perhaps legendary figure of Christianity. At her behest, in honor of the saint, altars and chapels were built in many churches, furthermore army officers had to join the saint's brotherhood and pay a tribute.

Maria Antonia, as hoped, soon became pregnant. However, on 18 May 1834 the family was struck by mourning: Archduchess Maximiliana, youngest daughter from Leopold II's first marriage, died at the age of seven. The young Grand Duchess was moved by the death of her stepdaughter; three days later, on 21 May, she gave birth for the first time: another baby girl was born, who was given the name Maria Isabella, in honor of her maternal grandmother. The Grand Duchess was struck by puerperal fever and only after long suffering did she manage to recover.

Just over a year later, the long-awaited heir was born. On 10 June 1835 at 9.20 in the evening (as Leopold II noted), Maria Antonia gave birth to a son who was immediately baptized Ferdinand in honor of his paternal grandfather and maternal uncle. The birth was welcomed with joy in all countries; the Prince Metternich wrote: «The assured succession in Tuscany is luck for all of Europe», since the order desired by the Congress of Vienna was thus preserved.

Between 1836 and 1852, Maria Antonia gave birth to eight more children: four girls and four boys. The grand ducal family was therefore made up in total of ten children born to Leopold II and Maria Antonia and the two surviving daughters from Leopold II's first marriage. Not all the children escaped death: Theresa (1836 – 1838), died in Livorno of typhoid fever; Marianna (1840 – 1841), died of convulsions; Carolina (1822 – 1841), the eldest, died after a year of agony; Rainer (1842 – 1844), died due to an unspecified illness; and Christina (1838 – 1849), died also of typhoid fever. All these deaths brought a lot of pain to the entire family: Maria Antonia always remained at her children's bedside until the end, only to faint from the suffering of seeing them die in her arms.

=== The prelude to 1848 and the Florentine Republic ===
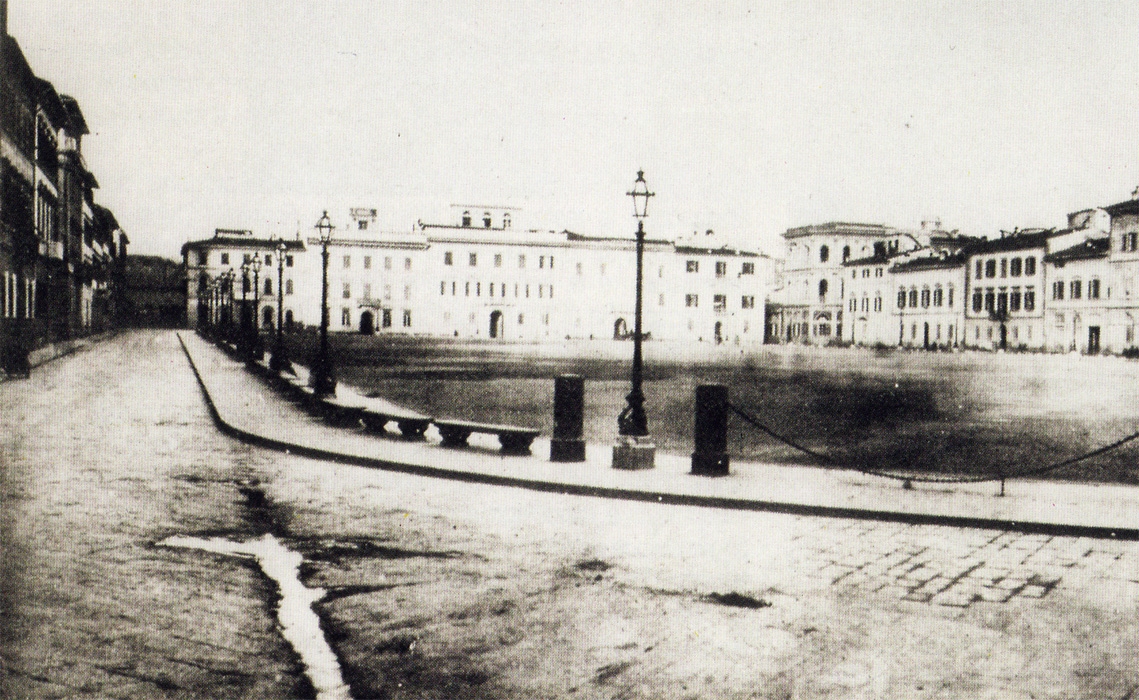
Piazza Maria Antonia, later Piazza dell'Indipendenza.

In 1844 Leopold II approved a project which envisaged building a road connecting Piazza San Marco, Via degli Arazzieri and the San Paolo bastion of the Fortezza da Basso, with a new neighborhood dominated by a large square in the centre. The construction was entrusted to the engineer Flaminio Chiesi and already in 1845 the square was open to the public. Initially there were some problems of swampiness resolved in 1852: the square took on its definitive appearance in 1855. It was decided to name it Piazza Maria Antonia in honor of the Grand Duchess, but the Florentines had already taken to calling it Piazza di Barbano, from the name of the vegetable gardens that once stood there. Furthermore, by the 1850s, times had changed: the name of a Bourbon Grand Duchess, sister of the infamous "King Bomba", (Note: King Ferdinand II of the Two Sicilies received this nickname following the cannonade of Messina, carried out by his will after the city's rebellion during the uprisings of 1848.) would never have been accepted.

In the same years, the Grand Duke carried out projects for the construction of two stations and two railways. In 1844 the first section of the Leopolda Railway was inaugurated, connecting Florence, Pisa and Livorno; in 1848 the section of the Florence-Prato line was opened, called the Maria Antonia Railway in honor of the Grand Duchess. In the same year the two related stations were also opened: the Maria Antonia Station first and then the Leopolda Station.

In 1847 Leopold II stood out for the liberal turn taken by his personal government: on 6 May freedom of the press was granted and on 4 September a Civic Guard was created. On 17 February 1848, a few days after his brother-in-law King Charles Albert of Sardinia, Leopold II granted to his realm a Constitution, which stood out from the others for granting full rights to citizens of all religions and on 18 March the first Tuscan constitutional government was born, presided over by Francesco Cempini. On the same day, Milan rose up against the Austrians, starting the Five Days of Milan. On 21 March, Leopold II aroused popular enthusiasm by deciding to send the few regular Tuscan troops, supported by volunteers, to fight in northern Italy alongside the Savoy troops against the Austrians; the Lorraine flag was replaced by the tricolor with the coat of arms of the House of Habsburg-Lorraine in the centre.

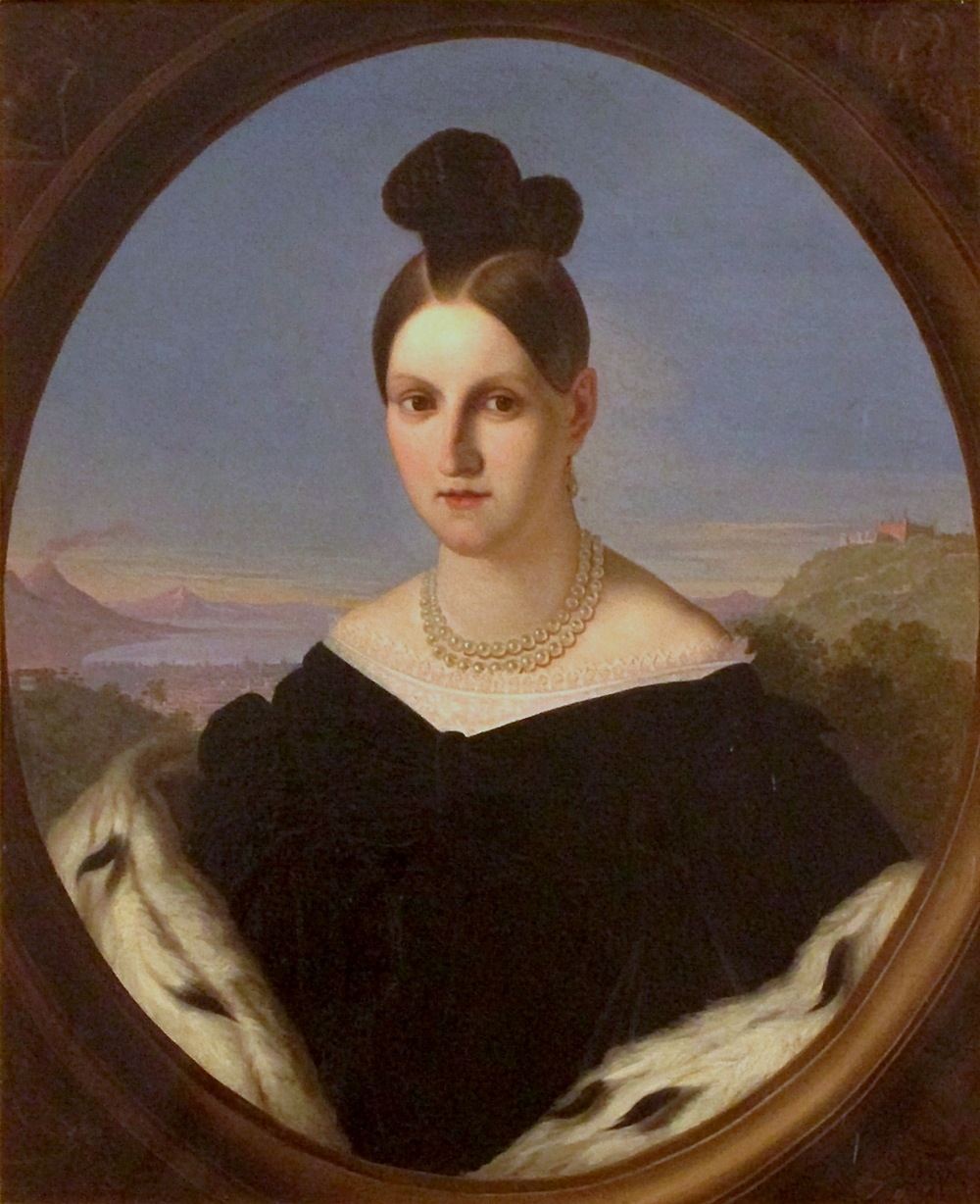
Grand Duchess Maria Antonia with Naples in the background, painted by Giuseppe Bezzuoli, 1847.

Towards the middle of the year, the expansionist attitudes of Charles Albert of Sardinia became clear and Leopold II decided to withdraw his troops. On 17 August the Grand Duke was forced to dismiss the moderate government of Cosimo Ridolfi and replace it with that of Gino Capponi. On 25 August riots broke out in Livorno led by the democrat Francesco Domenico Guerrazzi. In the wake of those events, Capponi resigned on 9 October. On 27 October Leopold II gave in to pressure and gave the post to the democrat Giuseppe Montanelli, who took Guerrazzi as Interior Minister, and inaugurated an ultra-democratic policy, or, in the political terminology of the time, aimed at union with the other Italian states and joint resumption of the war on Austria. Maria Antonia, meanwhile, with her family, had moved to Siena, from where on 4 November she sent a letter to her husband in which she informed him of her concerns:

«My dear Leopoldo, Pollastri came today and brought me your dear letter and gave me your news. You can believe how much has been said about you in these bad moments that you are in, take courage because dear, the world wants go like this, and of course the conditions in Tuscany are getting worse every day, and it seems impossible to me that order can be restored without a big bonfire, I hear that Lenzoni is being recalled, if this were the case think why he has to do my business here everything is calm but there are Ragnoni and Clementini who are sorry and have printed their letters to him, putting them as Citizen Minister that they hadn't put, already today they're doing it all, at least they'd make big ones so it would end; I expected the closing of the Chambers, I'm sorry that it will cause us to go a while without seeing you, but I believe that things won't take long and they'll tell you to go away, you're already reduced to nothing; at least you could take the good time and leave them, how they will fix Portoferraio, I always told you that I wasn't counting on it at all, it seems like a thousand years to see the end but the probability of going grows more and more. It seems to me a thousand years for Garibaldi to leave because what does he have to do with us, here they quote a letter from Mazzini where he says that for now they will preserve the Sovereign by putting people of their color in all the first jobs, and having done this they can then send the Prince back, they say it was written by Guerrazzi. We hope we will see each other again but I would like everyone to stay calm, thank God we are all well at least that's something. Tell me are you sure in case of the English vessel, wouldn't it be better to count on a Neapolitan, I don't know, I'm telling you because I wouldn't want him to find us without either one or the other. Say hello to Arrighi, Sproni and Matteo, I call myself Your most affectionate Antonietta.»

On 30 January 1849, the Grand Duke's signature was required in the Senate to approve the new political trend: Leopold II, who did not want to continue the war, left Florence and headed for Siena, from where he resolved to leave: Maria Antonia left with her youngest children, Luisa and Ludwig; Ferdinand and Karl set out with their knight-in-waiting; Leopold II went out with his sister, her stepmother/sister-in-law and daughters Isabella and Christina. The family reunited on the Rosìa village and then split up in Maremma: Leopold II and his older children embarked at Talamone to go to Porto Santo Stefano, Maria Antonia and her children continued on to Orbetello. Once in the city the Grand Duchess was attacked by the people who wanted to detain her together with her children, who burst into tears; the intervention of a hunter of the Grand Duke allowed the Grand Duchess to continue and reach her husband's ship. Meanwhile, on 9 February, in Florence, a triumvirate composed of Guerrazzi, Montanelli and Giuseppe Mazzoni was established, who wrote a new constitution and proclaimed the Republic on 15 February.

On 21 February Leopold II decided to place himself under the protection of his brother-in-law, King Ferdinand II of the Two Sicilies, and left for Gaeta, where Pope Pius IX had already taken refuge. The journey was rather turbulent: the Dowager Grand Duchess was ill, the children were crying and Maria Antonia was unconscious for a long time. Once they arrived in Gaeta, they were welcomed by the Pope in person.

=== The decade of preparation ===
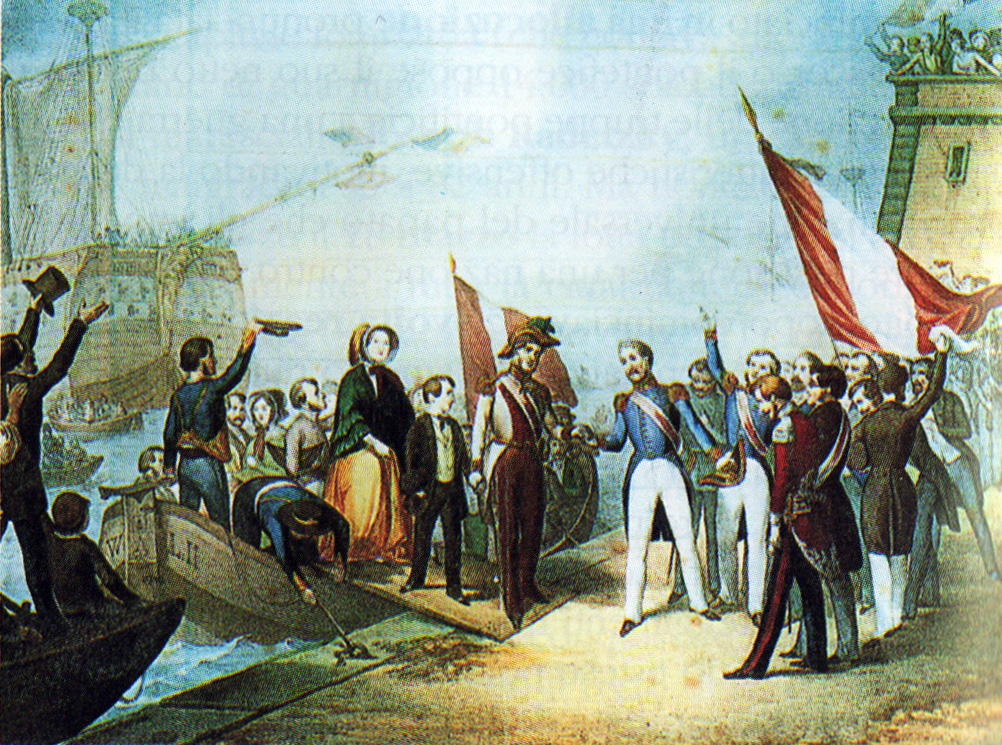
Grand Duke Leopold II and his family landed in Viareggio on 24 July 1849.

The exile lasted until April, when after the defeat of Charles Albert at Novara, the Tuscan moderates overthrew the Guerrazzi government to avoid an Austrian invasion and recalled the Grand Duke, hoping that he would maintain the reforms. In this context lies the conservative influence of Maria Antonia, who despite her little feeling of friendship towards the Austrians, saw only in them the possible restoration of the House of Habsburg-Lorraine on the throne of Tuscany. From Naples, on 16 April 1849, Maria Antonia wrote to Leopold II, who was in Gaeta:

«My dear Leopoldo, this morning I received the news of the events in Tuscany when I received yours, I am pleased that they want you but you will think about it first to go because without troops nothing can be done and then return with Capponi and others who brought you to this point you will think about it because now is the time to have no mercy with many who don't deserve it who will be the first to humble you; if we had Neapolitans for a year so that the Swiss would come, but it seems to me that the best are the Germans even though I hate them, but to do the cleaning there is only them and you wouldn't have the hatred.»

Maria Antonia hoped that the Austrian intervention could restore her husband, without damaging his reputation, but this was not the case: lieutenant-field marshal d'Aspre descended from Parma with 18,000 men, took and sacked Livorno and then occupied Florence. The grand ducal family left Gaeta on 21 July and landed in Viareggio three days later. On 28 July the grand ducal family was finally able to return to Florence. Shortly after their return, the 11-year-old Archduchess Christina fell ill with typhoid fever and on 1 September she died; her last words were: «Mom, thank you for what you have done for me».

On 10 April 1850, Archduchess Isabella, eldest daughter of Leopold II and Maria Antonia, married her uncle, Prince Francis of the Two Sicilies, Count of Trapani, Maria Antonia's youngest brother. On 12 April there was a celebration for the first anniversary of the restoration of the Grand Duke and on 21 April for that of the Pope in Rome. The political action of the Grand Duke, under the intransigent push of the young Emperor Franz Joseph I of Austria, resulted in a reactionary turn, although extremely mild compared to that of the other Italian kingdoms: on 25 April 1851 was signed a concordat, with who granted unlimited freedom and autonomy to the Church of Pius IX, in exchange for the formal recognition of the Tuscan succession in 1737 (an issue that had dragged on for 115 years); this further antagonized democratic and patriotic opinion. With a decree of 8 May 1852 he formally renounced the constitution of 17 February 1848, under continuous Austrian pressure. In 1857 he welcomed Pius IX, now radically hostile to the Risorgimento, on a visit to Florence.

Meanwhile Maria Antonia had become pregnant for the tenth time: on 20 November 1852 she gave birth to a child who was baptized Johann Salvator in honor of John, Crown Prince of Saxony, Leopold II's best friend and brother of Maria Anna (his first wife). The atmosphere in Florence had changed and the Grand Duchess, sister of the tyrannical and bloodthirsty King of the Two Sicilies, was under attack; La Maria Antonia, a little ditty dating back to 1848 written by Francesco Dall'Ongaro, read: «The day I return to my countries/they will see me again in my true form/With the braids of the Livorno people/I will make a mattress for myself and the eavesdroppers/Above the trophy of my offended rights/I will have sweeter and more flattering dreams/I will have them sheared by my Croatians/like tramps who have never been shorn». The Grand Duchess continued to take care of her family and her children; her constant interest was to found churches and institutes.

On 24 November 1856, in Dresden, Ferdinand, Crown Prince of Tuscany, married Princess Anna of Saxony, niece of both late Grand Duchess Maria Anna and Dowager Grand Duchess Maria Ferdinanda. On 15 December the bride entered Florence, welcomed by a cheering crowd. On 15 June 1857, however, the grand ducal family was struck by a new loss: Archduchess Luisa, Leopold II's invalid sister, died; Maria Antonia remained at her bedside until her end and performed her final duties.

=== The Florentine revolution of 1859 ===
Following the Plombières Agreement between Napoleon III and Cavour, it was decided that France would help Piedmont militarily only if Austria attacked first. Cavour cleverly managed to have Austria declare war, rejecting an Austrian ultimatum of 23 April 1859. On 26 April, Emperor Franz Joseph declared war on King Victor Emmanuel II. Both sovereigns asked their Tuscan uncle to participate in the war, but Leopold II, who did not want to involve the army in a bloody clash, proclaimed neutrality; but by now the Grand Ducal government's days were numbered: in Florence the population did not hesitate to offend the Grand Duchess with vulgar insults as she passed by and the troops showed signs of insubordination. That same night, a meeting of the leaders of the various political groups in favor of Italian unification was held in Florence; many officers of the Tuscan army were also present. A large demonstration was arranged for the following day in all the principal cities, and a provisional junta was appointed. The revolution was ready to break out.

On the morning of 27 April 1859, a procession set off from Piazza Maria Antonia (later renamed Piazza dell'Indipendenza) towards Palazzo Vecchio, where the Italian tricolor was hoisted instead of the Lorraine flag. At the Pitti Palace it was decided that the Grand Duchess, the children, the Archduke Karl and the Dowager Grand Duchess would take refuge in the Forte Belvedere, while the Grand Duke and Crown Prince Ferdinand would remain at the palace. Grand Duke Leopold II, entrenched in Palazzo Pitti with his ministers, summoned Prince Neri Corsini, a liberal of the highest reputation not directly involved with the rebels, declaring that he was willing to form a new government and take sides against Austria-Hungary and grant a constitution; to calm things down he allowed the troops to raise the tricolour.

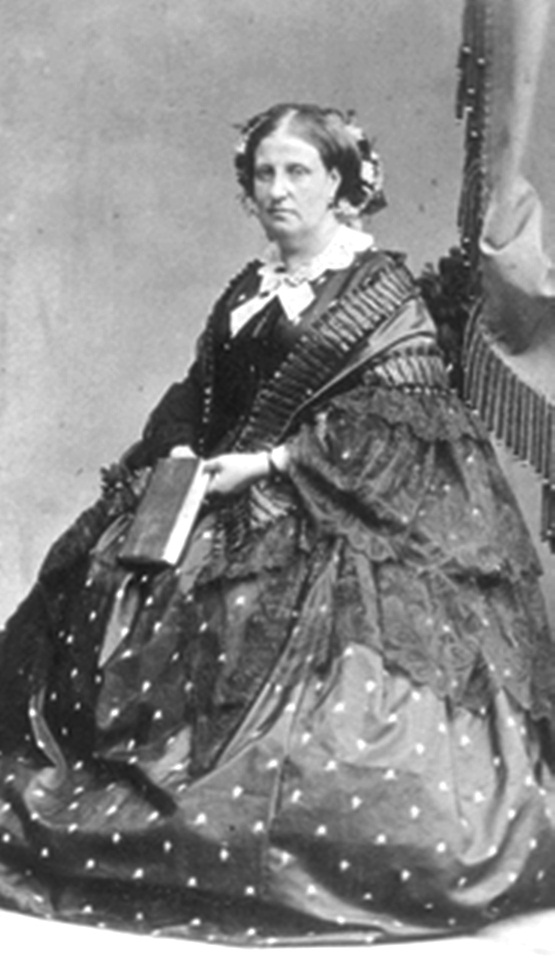
Grand Duchess Maria Antonia in exile. Photograph by Moriz Ludwig Winter, ca. 1870.

Prince Corsini went to the diplomatic headquarters of the Kingdom of Sardinia where the conspirator leaders were gathered, but returned to the Grand Duke with a deliberately unacceptable ultimatum, which also provided for the abdication of the sovereign. Leopold II understood the bad situation and prepared to leave Florence with his family, certainly wanting to avoid bloodshed and in any case not being able to count on the army, but refusing to abdicate.

At two in the afternoon, Leopold II and Ferdinand went up to Forte Belvedere to wait for the carriages to be ready for departure. When the Grand Duke informed his family of his immediate departure, Maria Antonia told him: «I fear that if we leave Florence, we will never return». Leopold II replied to her: «Do you perhaps expect me to dishonor myself with an abdication, which is imposed on me by my subjects?». The Grand Duchess then said to him: «Wise men must adapt to circumstances; listen to me, abdicate». After having also spoken with his son, the Grand Duke was ready for this last act, but Buoncompagni told the two officers sent to the Sardinian legation that it was too late.

At six o'clock, in front of a large tumultuous crowd in the streets of Florence and the open revolt of the army, Leopold II left in a carriage from Fort Belvedere, exiting through the Porta di Boboli, towards the road to Bologna. The peaceful resignation to the course of history (the Grand Duke never thought of a solution of force) and the manner of the farewell, with a few personal effects loaded into three carriages and with declarations of sympathy to the court staff, meant that in these last moments of staying in Tuscany the now ex-subjects regained for a while their ancient esteem for Leopold II: the grand ducal family was greeted by the Florentines, who took off their hats as they passed, with the cry "Goodbye father Leopold!" and accompanied with all due respect by an escort to Filigare, now ex-customs with the Papal State. At six in the afternoon of that same day, the Municipality of Florence noted the absence of any provisions left by the sovereign and appointed a provisional government.

Having taken refuge at the Viennese court, the deposed Grand Duke officially abdicated only on the following 21 July; since then he lived in Bohemia, going to Rome in 1869, where he died on 28 January 1870, a few months before the fall of the Eternal City. In 1914 his remains were then transported to Vienna to be buried in the Habsburg mausoleum, the Capuchin Crypt.

=== The years of exile. Death ===
After her husband's death, Maria Antonia had a villa with park called "Villa Toscana" built in Gmunden, Upper Austria; the building was built between 1870 and 1877. Her youngest son Archduke Johann Salvator also took part in the design of the building. In addition, the Tuscan royal family had frequented Traunsee since 1866, taking up residence in Altmünster. On 30 January 1889 the imperial family was shocked by the Mayerling incident, in which Crown Prince Rudolf lost his life. Johann Salvator was particularly shocked by the death of his cousin (to whom he was linked by a sincere friendship and shared similar liberal opinions) and eight months later, on 16 October, decided to renounce his titles, rank and privileges; from that moment, he was a simple Austrian citizen called Johann Orth, the surname derived from the name of a castle he had owned, Schloss Orth. The Emperor stripped Johann of his Austrian nationality, and he headed for England; on 26 March 1890, together with his wife Ludmilla "Milli" Stubel (a dancer at the Vienna State Opera) he set sail for Argentina on the ship "Santa Margareta". After a stop in Buenos Aires, the ship set sail again in July 1890: it was the last time Johann, his wife and the crew were seen. The Emperor had the vessel searched without results and the former Archduke was declared missing. Maria Antonia always refused to mourn Johann Salvator, convinced that her son was still alive; some scammers even managed to extort money from her by providing false information.

Maria Antonia spent the last years of her life in anguish. In April 1893 she was invited by Duke Amerigo Antinori to visit his newly renovated palace in Florence; although she remained there for a few days, the Dowager Grand Duchess received demonstrations of affection not only from the old nobility, but also from the people of the neighborhood. On 16 April 1898 was born her first great-great-grandchild, Princess Maria Antonietta Leonia of Bourbon-Two Sicilies (daughter of Prince Ferdinand Pius, Duke of Castro, son of Princess Maria Antonietta of Bourbon-Two Sicilies, daughter of Archduchess Maria Isabella of Austria, Maria Antonia's eldest daughter); seven months later, on 7 November, Maria Antonia died at Schloss Orth in Gmunden aged 83. She was buried in the Capuchin Crypt in Vienna. In her honor, on 4 December a solemn mass was celebrated in Florence in the Basilica della Santissima Annunziata with great participation.

Her granddaughter, Archduchess Louise, Crown Princess of Saxony, wrote in her memoirs:

She was stiff, a slave to etiquette, and a bigoted Catholic, entirely in the hands of the priests. She was, however, intelligent. We were always very much afraid of her, and she was mean to miserliness; indeed, to dine with grandmother meant getting hardly anything to eat. She died near Salzburg in 1898, a lonely, colourless woman; and heredity, so strong in our family, gave to her children the individuality she had been denied.

== Issue ==
- Archduchess Maria Isabella (21 May 1834 – 14 July 1901), who wed her maternal uncle Prince Francis, Count of Trapani, youngest son of Francis I of the Two Sicilies.
- Ferdinand IV, Grand Duke of Tuscany (10 June 1835 – 17 January 1908).
- Archduchess Maria Theresa (29 June 1836 – 5 August 1838), died in childhood.
- Archduchess Maria Christina (5 February 1838 – 1 September 1849), died in childhood.
- Archduke Karl Salvator (30 April 1839 – 18 January 1892)
- Archduchess Maria Anna (9 June 1840 – 13 August 1841), died in childhood.
- Archduke Rainer (1 May 1842 – 14 August 1844), died in childhood.
- Archduchess Maria Luisa (31 October 1845 – 27 August 1917), who wed Karl, Prince of Isenburg-Büdingen.
- Archduke Ludwig Salvator (4 August 1847 – 12 October 1915).
- Archduke Johann Salvator (25 November 1852 – reported lost at sea in 1890, amidst speculation that he survived, subsequently using the alias "Johann Orth").

== Honours ==
- Austria-Hungary : Dame of the Order of the Starry Cross
- Two Sicilies : Dame of the Sacred Military Constantinian Order of Saint George
- Spain : Dame of the Order of Queen Maria Luisa
- Russian Empire : Dame Grand Cross of the Order of Saint Catherine

== Ancestry ==
Ancestors of Princess Maria Antonia of the Two Sicilies

8. Charles III of Spain (= 12)
4. Ferdinand I of the Two Sicilies
9. Maria Amalia of Saxony (= 13)
2. Francis I of the Two Sicilies
10. Francis I, Holy Roman Emperor
5. Maria Carolina of Austria
11. Maria Theresa of Austria
1. Maria Antonia of Bourbon-Two Sicilies
12. Charles III of Spain (= 8)
6. Charles IV of Spain
13. Maria Amalia of Saxony (= 9)
3. Maria Isabella of Spain
14. Philip, Duke of Parma
7. Maria Luisa of Parma
15. Louise Élisabeth of France

== Bibliography ==
- Regolo, Luciano (2000). La reginella santa - Tutto il racconto della vita di Maria Cristina di Savoia sovrana delle Due Sicilie (in Italian). Milan: Simonelli Editore. ISBN 88-86792-22-0.
- Pesendorfer, Franz (1987). Leopoldo II di Lorena, Il governo di famiglia in Toscana. Memorie del granduca Leopoldo II di Lorena (1824-1859) (in Italian). Florence: Sansoni Editore. ISBN 88-383-0019-4.
- Zobi, Antonio (1852). Storia civile della Toscana (in Italian). Florence: Luigi Molini.
- Conti, Giuseppe (2010). Firenze vecchia (rist. anast. Firenze, 1899) (in Italian). Giunti Editore. ISBN 88-097-5192-2.
- Demo (1861). I contemporanei italiani. Galleria Nazionale del XIX secolo: Leopoldo II (in Italian). Torino: Unione tipografico-editrice.

Princess Maria Antonia of the Two Sicilies House of Bourbon-Two Sicilies Cadet branch of the House of Bourbon Born: 19 December 1814 Died: 3 January 1865
Italian royalty
Vacant Title last held by Maria Anna of Saxony	Grand Duchess consort of Tuscany; 7 June 1833 – 21 July 1859	Monarchy abolished
Titles in pretence
Loss of title Republic declared	— TITULAR — Grand Duchess consort of Tuscany; 21 July 1859 – 3 January 1865	Vacant Title next held by Alice of Parma
