= Karl II, Prince of Isenburg-Birstein =

Karl II
- Prince of Isenburg and Büdingen in Birstein
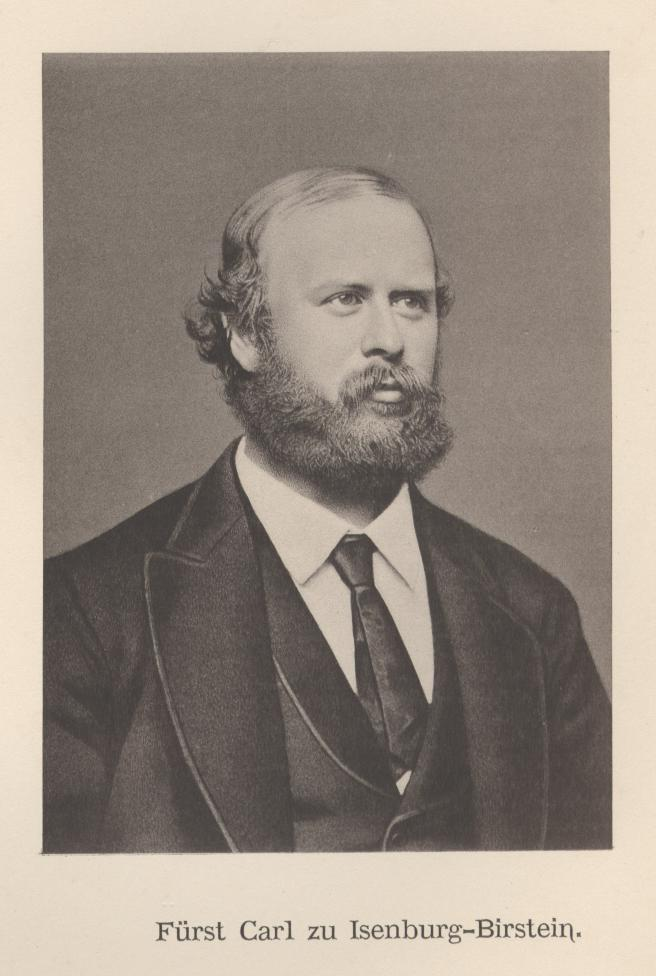
- Lithograph, 1880
- Born: 29 July 1838; Birstein, Electorate of Hesse
- Died: 4 April 1899 (aged 60); Schlackenwerth bei Karlsbad, Kingdom of Bohemia, Austria-Hungary
- Spouse: Archduchess Maria Luisa of Austria (m. 1865)
- Issue: Prince Leopold Wolfgang; Princess Maria Antonia; Princess Maria Michaele; Prince Franz Joseph; Prince Karl Joseph; Prince Victor Salvator; Prince Alfonso Maria; Princess Marie Elizabeth; Princess Adelaide
Names
- German: Karl Viktor Amadeus Wolfgang Kasimir Adolf Bodo
- House: Isenburg
- Father: Prince Victor Alexander of Isenburg-Büdingen
- Mother: Princess Maria of Löwenstein-Wertheim-Rosenberg

Karl II, Prince of Isenburg-Büdingen in Birstein (full name: Karl Viktor Amadeus Wolfgang Kasimir Adolf Bodo) (29 July 1838 – 2 April 1899) was head of the mediatised German house of Isenburg and Büdingen.

== Biography ==
Karl was born in Birstein, Hesse, as the second child of Victor Alexander, Prince of Isenburg-Büdingen, son of Karl, last sovereign Prince of Isenburg, and his wife, Princess Maria of Löwenstein-Wertheim-Rosenberg. After the early death of his father in 1843, Karl was placed in the charge of his uncle, Wolfgang Ernst III, Prince of Isenburg-Birstein, who had him raised in his Protestant denomination, but he was exposed to the Catholic faith by his mother and in 1861, converted to Catholicism.

On May 31, 1865, at the age of twenty-seven, he married Archduchess Maria Luisa of Austria (1845–1917), daughter Leopold II, Grand Duke of Tuscany and his second wife, Princess Maria Antonia of the Two Sicilies. The couple had nine children. In 1866, after the death of his uncle, Karl succeeded him as Prince of Isenburg-Birstein.

Karl died at the age of sixty in 1899, and his wife Maria Luisa died in 1917. They are the ancestors of Sophie, Princess of Prussia, wife of Georg Friedrich, head of the House of Prussia which reigned as German emperors until 1918.

== Issue ==
Karl and Maria Luisa had nine children:

- Prince Leopold Wolfgang (1866–1933), succeeded his father as Prince of Isenburg. In 1902 he wed Princess Olga of Saxe-Weimar-Eisenach (1869–1924), daughter of Prince Hermann of Saxe-Weimar-Eisenach, and had issue. He married secondly in 1924 Countess Marie von Dürckheim-Montmartin (1880–1937), without issue.
- Princess Maria Antonia (1867–1943).
- Princess Maria Michaele (1868–1919).
- Prince Franz Joseph (1869–1939), married Princess Friederike of Solms-Braunfels, and had issue. They are the great-grandparents of Sophie, Princess of Prussia.
- Prince Karl Joseph (1871–1951), married morganatically Bertha Lewis.
- Prince Victor Salvator (1872–1946), married Leontine Rohrer.
- Prince Alfonso Maria (1875–1951), married in 1900 Countess Pauline Marie of Beaufort-Spontin (1876–1955), and had issue.
- Princess Marie Elizabeth (1877–1943), married Georg Beyer
- Princess Adelaide Maria (1878–1936).

== Orders and decorations ==
- Grand Duchy of Hesse: Grand Cross of the Grand Ducal Hessian Order of Ludwig, 12 January 1881
- Austrian Empire: Knight of the Order of the Golden Fleece, 1867
- Kingdom of Prussia: Grand Cross of the Order of the Red Eagle
- Grand Duchy of Tuscany: Grand Cross of the Order of Saint Joseph

== Bibliography ==
- Das katholische Deutschland, repräsentirt durch seine Wortführer. Porträts hervorragender Katholiken in Lichtdruck ausgeführt mit kurzen Character- und Lebensbeschreibungen. 2. Serie, 1. Heft, Verlag Leo Woerl, Würzburg 1878.
- Manfred Hermanns: Weltweiter Dienst am Menschen unterwegs. Auswandererberatung und Auswandererfürsorge durch das Raphaels-Werk 1871-2011. Friedberg 2011, ISBN 978-3-87614-079-7, hier S. 25, 26, 39, 53, 84.
- David August Rosenthal: Fürst Karl zu Isenburg-Birstein. In: ders.: Konvertitenbilder aus den neunzehnten Jahrhundert. Band 1: Deutschland, Teil 3, Manz Verlag, 3. Auflage, Regensburg 1901, S. 431–433.
