= Archduchess Maria Luisa of Austria (1845–1917) =

- Princess of Isenburg and Büdingen
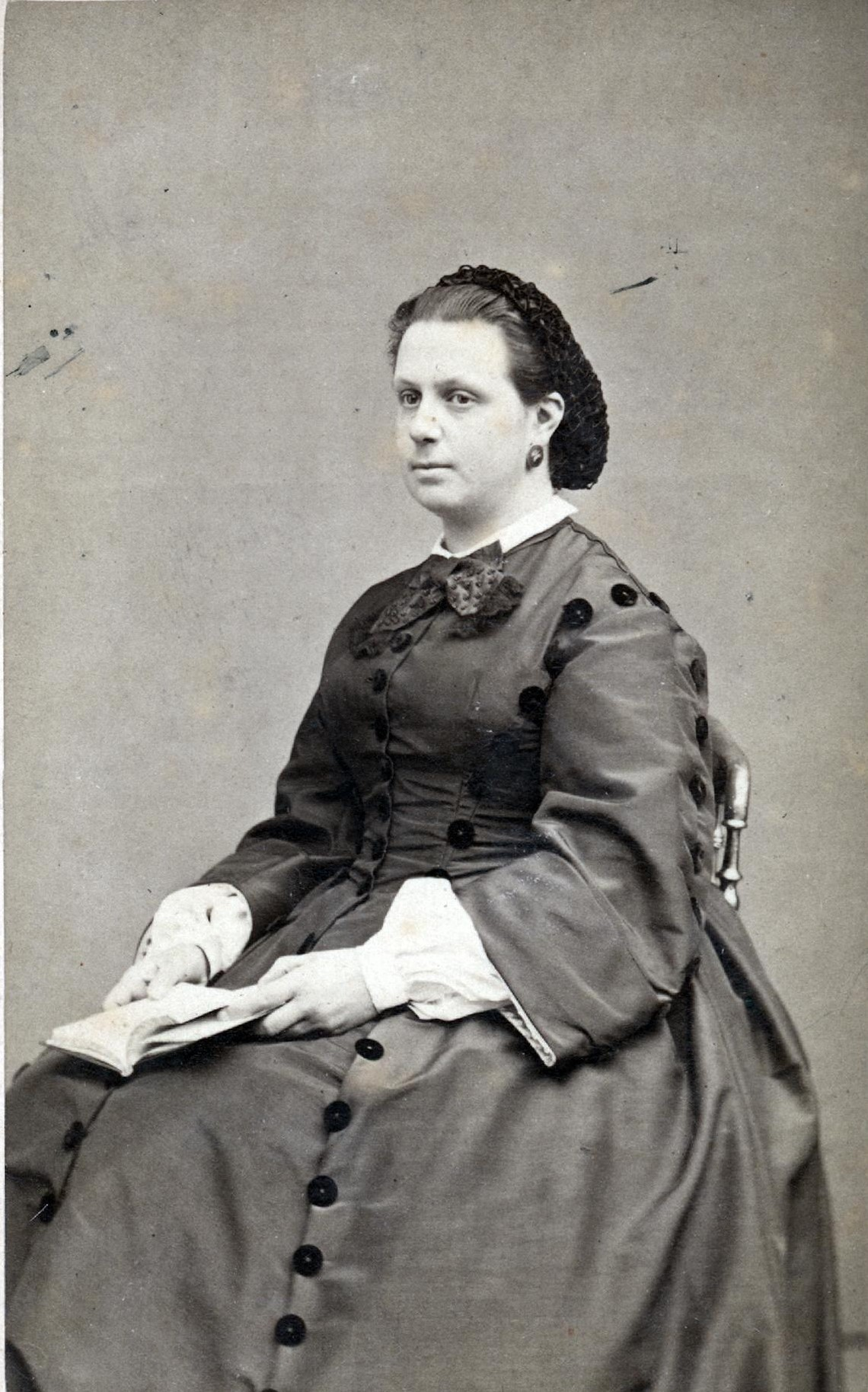
- Archduchess Maria Luisa, c. 1860.
- Born: 31 October 1845; Florence, Grand Duchy of Tuscany
- Died: 27 August 1917 (aged 71); Hanau, Grand Duchy of Hesse
- Spouse: Karl II, Prince of Isenburg-Birstein (m. 1865; died 1899)
- Issue: Prince Leopold Wolfgang; Princess Antonia; Princess Maria; Prince Franz Joseph; Prince Victor Salvator; Prince Alfonso; Princess Elizabeth; Princess Adelaide
Names
- Italian: Maria Luisa Annunziata Anna Giovanna Giuseppa Antonietta Filomena Apollonia Tommasa
- House: House of Habsburg-Lorraine (by birth); House of Isenburg-Büdingen (by Marriage)
- Father: Leopold II of Tuscany
- Mother: Princess Maria Antonia of Bourbon-Two Sicilies

Archduchess Maria Luisa of Austria, Princess of Tuscany (full name: Maria Luisa Annunziata Anna Giovanna Giuseppa Antonietta Filomena Apollonia Tommasa) (31 October 1845 – 27 August 1917) was a Princess of Tuscany, and later Princess of Isenburg and Büdingen.

== Biography ==
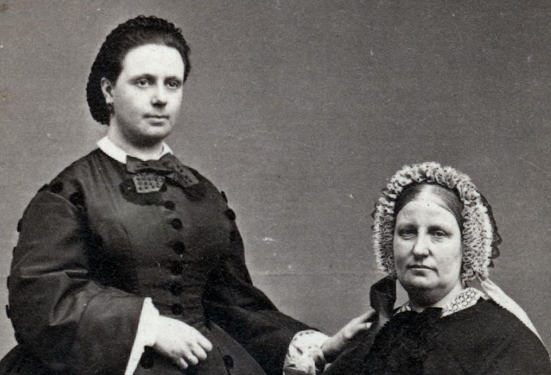
Archduchess Maria Luisa and her mother, Maria Antonietta Grand Duchess of Tuscany.

Maria Luisa was born in Florence, the eighth child and fifth daughter of Leopold II of Tuscany and his second wife, Princess Maria Antonia of the Two Sicilies. Her paternal grandparents were Ferdinand III of Tuscany and Luisa of Naples and Sicily. Her maternal grandparents were King Francis I of the Two Sicilies and María Isabella of Spain, Infanta of Spain. She was baptized in Florence's Battistero di San Giovanni as Maria Luisa Annunziata Anna Giovanna Giuseppa Antonietta Filomena Apollonia Tommasa, in honor of her father's sister, Princess Maria Luisa (1798–1857), affectionately called "the little hunchback" by the people of Florence.

Maria Luisa was born in a time of peace and prosperity for the Grand Duchy of Tuscany, and she was raised in a loving family environment. However, she was first confronted with the dangers of her position at a young age, due to the Revolutions of 1848. In February 1849, the Grand Ducal family decided to go to Gaeta as a security measure. The Grand Duchess Maria Antonia traveled separately with her two younger children, Maria Luisa and Ludwig. The family remained in Gaeta for several months and was unable to return to Florence until 28 July 1849.

Later, Maria Luisa and her family were forced to flee Florence on 27 April 1859, with the outbreak of a revolution inspired by the war by France and Sardinia-Piedmont against Austria as part of the unification of Italy. The family took refuge in Austria. At the end of the war, her father Leopold II abdicated on 21 July and his son Ferdinand succeeded him as Grand Duke.

On 31 May 1865, at the age of twenty, Maria Luisa married Karl II, Prince of Isenburg-Birstein (1838–1899) in Brandeis, Bohemia. Her husband was a grandson of Karl, last sovereign Prince of Isenburg. The couple had nine children. Karl died at the age of sixty, and Maria Luisa died during World War I, in 1917. They are the ancestors of Sophie, Princess of Prussia, wife of Georg Friedrich, Prince of Prussia, the head of the House of Hohenzollern.

== Issue ==
Maria Luisa and Karl had nine children:

- Prince Leopold Wolfgang Ernst (1866–1933), succeeded his father as Prince of Isenburg. In 1902 he wed Princess Olga of Saxe-Weimar-Eisenach (1869–1924), daughter of Prince Hermann of Saxe-Weimar-Eisenach, and had issue. He married secondly in 1924 Countess Marie von Dürckheim-Montmartin (1880–1937), without issue.
- Princess Maria Antonia Charlotte (1867–1943).
- Princess Maria Michaele Johanna (1868–1919).
- Prince Franz Joseph Maria (1869–1939), married Princess Friederike of Solms-Braunfels, and had issue. They are the great-grandparents of Sophie, Princess of Prussia.
- Prince Karl Joseph Maria (1871–1951), married morganatically Bertha Lewis.
- Prince Viktor Salvator Karl (1872–1946), married Leontine Rohrer.
- Prince Alfons Maria Leopold (1875–1951), married in 1900 Countess Pauline Marie of Beaufort-Spontin (1876–1955), and had issue.
- Princess Marie Elisabeth Franziska (1877–1943), married Georg Beyer
- Princess Adelheid Maria Sophie (1878–1936).

== Ancestry ==
Ancestors of Archduchess Maria Luisa of Austria (1845–1917)

8. Leopold II, Holy Roman Emperor
4. Ferdinand III of Tuscany
9. Maria Luisa of Spain
2. Leopold II of Tuscany
10. Ferdinand I of the Two Sicilies
5. Luisa of Naples and Sicily
11. Maria Carolina of Austria
1. Archduchess Maria Luisa of Austria
12. Ferdinand I of the Two Sicilies (= 10)
6. Francis I of the Two Sicilies
13. Maria Carolina of Austria (= 11)
3. Maria Antonia of the Two Sicilies
14. Charles IV of Spain
7. María Isabel of Spain
15. Maria Luisa of Parma
