= Leopold II of Tuscany =

Grand Duke of Tuscany from 1824 to 1859

Leopold II
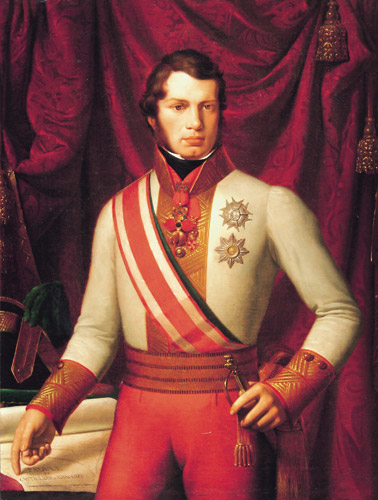
- Grand Duke Leopold in the uniform of an Austrian field marshal, 1828, by Pietro Benvenuti

Grand Duke of Tuscany
- Reign: 18 June 1824 – 21 July 1859
- Predecessor: Ferdinand III
- Successor: Ferdinand IV
- Born: 3 October 1797; Florence, Tuscany
- Died: 29 January 1870 (aged 72); Rome, Papal States
- Consort: Princess Maria Anna of Saxony (m. 1817; died 1832) Princess Maria Antonia of the Two Sicilies (m. 1833)
- Issue Detail: Archduchess Caroline; Auguste Ferdinande, Princess of Bavaria; Archduchess Maria Maximiliana; Maria Isabella, Countess of Trapani; Ferdinand IV of Tuscany; Archduchess Maria Theresa; Archduchess Maria Christina; Archduke Karl Salvator; Archduchess Maria Anna; Archduke Rainer; Maria Luisa, Princess of Isenburg and Büdingen; Archduke Ludwig Salvator, Count of Neuendorf; Archduke Johann Salvator
Names
- Leopoldo Giovanni Giuseppe Francesco Ferdinando Carlo
- House: Habsburg-Lorraine (initially); Habsburg-Tuscany (founded)
- Father: Ferdinand III of Tuscany
- Mother: Princess Luisa of Naples and Sicily
- Religion: Roman Catholicism

Leopold II (Note: Italian: Leopoldo Giovanni Giuseppe Francesco Ferdinando Carlo, English: Leopold John Joseph Francis Ferdinand Charles.) (3 October 1797 – 29 January 1870) was Grand Duke of Tuscany from 1824 to 1859. He married twice; firstly Maria Anna of Saxony, and after her death in 1832 Maria Antonia of the Two-Sicilies. By the latter, he had a son, Ferdinand, who later succeeded him. Leopold was recognised contemporarily as a liberal monarch, authorising the Tuscan Constitution of 1848, and allowing a degree of press freedom.

The Grand Duke was deposed briefly by a provisional government in 1849, only to be restored the same year with the assistance of Austrian troops, who occupied the state until 1855. Leopold attempted a policy of neutrality with regard to the Second Italian War of Independence but was expelled by a bloodless coup on 27 April 1859, just before the beginning of the war. The Grand Ducal family left for Bologna, papal territory since the Congress of Vienna. Tuscany was occupied by soldiers of Victor Emmanuel II of Sardinia for the duration of the conflict. The Armistice of Villafranca, agreed to between Napoleon III of France and Franz Joseph I of Austria on 11 July, provided for the return of the Lorraines to Florence, but Leopold himself was considered too unpopular to be accepted, and on 21 July 1859, he abdicated the throne in favour of his son, Ferdinand. Ferdinand was not, however, any more acceptable to the revolutionaries in control of Florence, and his accession was not proclaimed. Instead, the provisional government proclaimed the deposition of the House of Habsburg on 16 August 1859.

== Biography ==
=== Early life ===
Born in Florence, Leopold II was the son of Ferdinand III of Tuscany and Princess Luisa Maria Amelia Teresa of the Two Sicilies, who were double first cousins. His maternal grandparents were Ferdinand I of the Two Sicilies and Maria Carolina of Austria. He accompanied his father while fleeing to Germany when Tuscany was occupied by the French. He and his family returned to Florence after Napoleon's defeat in 1814.

=== Reign ===
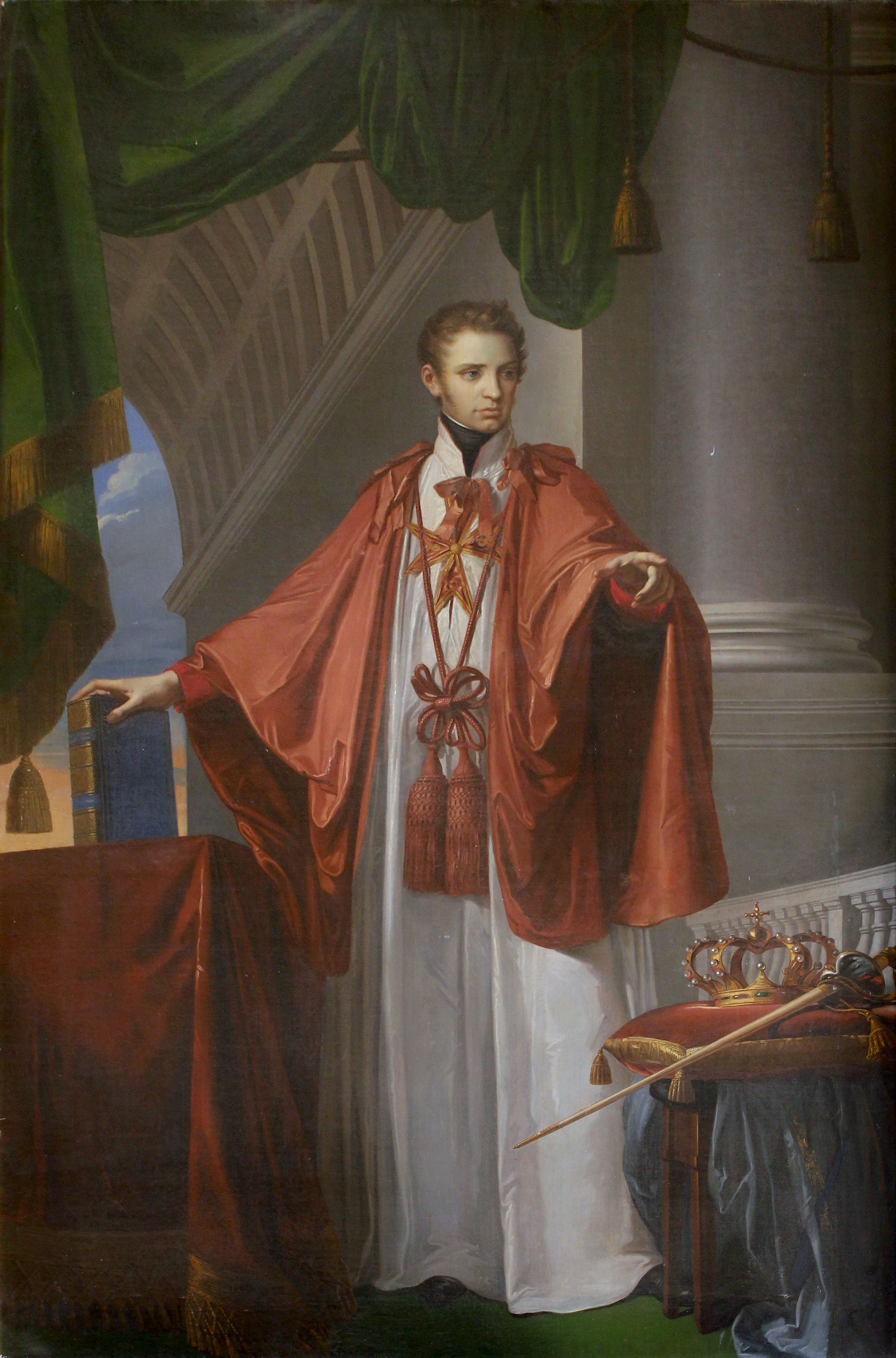
Portrait of Leopold II, Grand Duke of Tuscany, painted by Giuseppe Bezzuoli, circa 1825, National Museum of the Royal Palace

He succeeded his father on 18 June 1824. During the first twenty years of his reign he devoted himself to the internal development of the state. His was the mildest and least reactionary of all the Italian despotisms of the day and, although always subject to Austrian influence, he refused to adopt the Austrian methods of government, allowed a fair measure of liberty to the press, and permitted many political exiles from other states to dwell in Tuscany undisturbed.

But when during the early 1840s unrest spread throughout Italy, even in Tuscany demands for a constitution and other political reforms were advanced. In 1845 and 1846, riots occurred in various parts of the country prompting Leopold to grant a number of administrative reforms. But Austrian influence prevented him from doing more, even had he wished to do so. After the election of Pope Pius IX gave fresh encouragement to Liberalism, Leopold instituted the National Guard on 4 September in 1847. Soon afterward the marchese Cosimo Ridolfi (1794–1865) was appointed prime minister. The granting of the Neapolitan and Piedmontese constitutions was followed on 17 February 1848 by that of Tuscany written by Gino Capponi.

==== Italian Wars of Independence ====
The uprisings in Milan and in Vienna aroused patriotic enthusiasm in Tuscany, where war against Austria was demanded. Leopold, yielding to popular pressure, sent a force of regulars and volunteers to co-operate with Piedmont in the Lombard campaign. His speech on their departure was uncompromisingly Italian and liberal. "Soldiers," he said, "the holy cause of Italian freedom is being decided to-day on the fields of Lombardy. Already the citizens of Milan have purchased their liberty with their blood and with a heroism of which history offers few examples... Honour to the arms of Italy! Long live Italian independence!" The Tuscan contingent fought bravely, though unsuccessfully, at Curtatone and Montanara.

On 26 June, the first Tuscan parliament assembled but the disturbances following the failure of the campaign in Lombardy resulted in the resignation of the Ridolfi ministry, which was succeeded by that of Gino Capponi. The riots continued, especially at Livorno which descended into actual civil war, and the democratic party of which Francesco Domenico Guerrazzi and Giuseppe Montanelli were organizers became more influential. Capponi resigned, and Leopold agreed reluctantly to a Montanelli-Guerrazzi ministry, which in its turn had to fight against the extreme republican party.

New elections in the autumn of 1848 returned a constitutional majority, but it ended by voting in favour of a constituent assembly. There was talk of instituting a central Italian kingdom with Leopold as king as part of a larger Italian federation, but in the meanwhile the grand-duke, alarmed at the revolutionary and republican agitations in Tuscany and encouraged by the success of the Austrian troops, was, according to Montanelli, negotiating with Field Marshal Radetzky and with Pius IX who had abandoned his liberal tendencies and fled to Gaeta. Leopold left Florence for Siena and eventually for Porto Santo Stefano, leaving a letter to Guerrazzi in which he declared that he could not agree to the proposed constituent assembly on account of a protest from the pope. The utmost confusion prevailed in Florence and other parts of Tuscany.

On 18 February 1849, a republic was proclaimed and on that same day Leopold sailed for Gaeta. A third parliament was elected and Guerrazzi appointed dictator, but there was great discontent in the country and the defeat of Charles Albert at Novara caused consternation among the Liberals. The majority, while fearing an Austrian invasion, desired the return of the grand duke who had never been unpopular. In April, the municipal council usurped the powers of the assembly and invited him to return, "to save us by means of the restoration of the constitutional monarchy surrounded by popular institutions, from the shame and ruin of a foreign invasion." Leopold accepted, although he said nothing about the foreign invasion, and on 1 May sent Count Luigi Serristori to Tuscany with full powers.

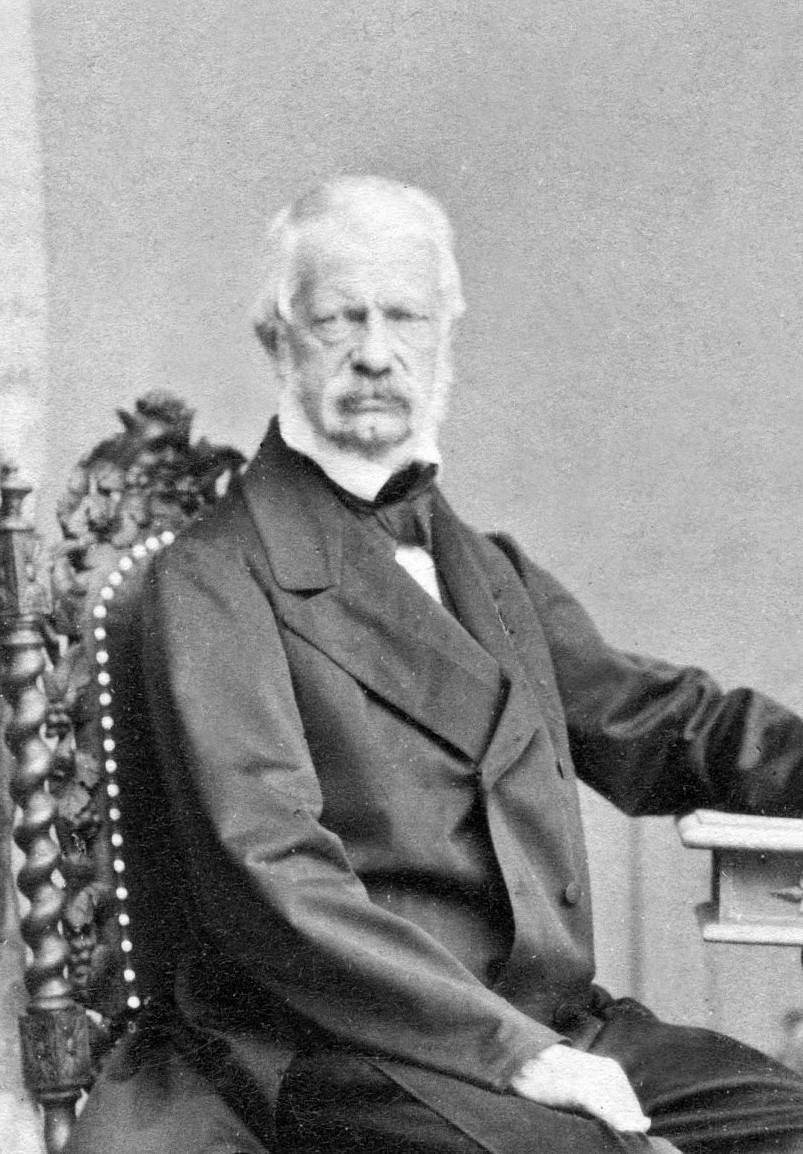
Photograph of an elderly Leopold II in 1862

=== Abdication and later life ===
At the same time, the Austrians occupied Lucca and Livorno. Although Leopold feigned surprise at their action, it has since been proved that, as the Austrian general d'Aspre declared at the time, the Austrian intervention was due to the request of the grand duke. On 24 May, Giovanni Baldasseroni was appointed prime minister with the Austrians entering Florence the next day. On 28 July, Leopold himself returned. In April 1850, he concluded a treaty with Austria suspending the constitution for an indefinite period and agreeing to an Austrian occupation force of 10,000 men. That September, he dismissed parliament and the next year established a concordat with the Church of a very clerical character. He asked Austria if he might maintain the constitution and the Austrian premier Prince Felix of Schwarzenberg advised him to consult the pope, the king of Naples and the dukes of Parma and Modena.

On their advice he formally revoked the constitution in 1852. Political trials were held with Guerrazzi and many others being condemned to long terms of imprisonment. By the time the Austrian troops left Tuscany in 1855, Leopold's popularity was gone. Some of the Liberals, however, still believed in the possibility of a constitutional grand duke who could be induced for a second time to join Piedmont in a war against Austria, but the popular party headed by Ferdinando Bartolommei and Giuseppe Dolfi believed that only by the expulsion of Leopold could the national aspirations be realised. In 1859, when France and Piedmont made war on Austria, Leopold's government failed to prevent numbers of young Tuscan volunteers from joining the Franco-Piedmontese forces. Eventually, an agreement was arrived at between the aristocratic constitutionalists and the popular party leading the Grand Duke's participation in the war to be formally demanded.

Leopold gave way at first, entrusting Don Neri Corsini with the formation of a ministry. The popular demands presented by Corsini were for the abdication of Leopold in favour of his son, an alliance with Piedmont and the reorganisation of Tuscany in accordance with a larger reorganisation of Italy. Leopold hesitated and finally rejected the proposals as insulting to his dignity. But on 27 April, there was a great disturbance in Florence with the Italian colours being flown everywhere. While order was maintained, the Grand Duke and his family departed for Bologna. Thus the revolution was accomplished without blood being shed and, after a period of provisional government, Tuscany was incorporated in the Kingdom of Italy. On 21 July, Leopold abdicated in favour of his son Ferdinand IV of Tuscany. Ferdinand IV never reigned but issued a protest to the annexation from Dresden on 26 March.

After his abdication, he lived in exile in Austria for many years and was elected mayor of Schlackenwerth (Ostrov). Having lived in Rome since 1869, he died there on 29 January 1870, only a few months before Italy captured the city.

== Evaluation ==
Leopold of Tuscany was a well-meaning, not unkindly man, and fonder of his subjects than were the other Italian despots, but he was weak, and too closely bound by family ties and Habsburg traditions ever to become a real Liberal. Had he not joined the conclave of autocrats at Gaeta, and, above all, had he not summoned Austrian assistance while denying that he had done so, in 1849, he might yet have preserved his throne, and even changed the course of Italian history. At the same time his rule, if not harsh, was demoralising.

Along with his wife, he was the founding patron of the Istituto Statale della Ss. Annunziata, the first female boarding school in Florence. Leopold ordered the construction of La Botte, a water tunnel under the Arno river, which allowed for the final drainage of the Lago di Bientina, which had previously been the largest lake in Tuscany. Completed in 1859, La Botte remains an important part of the Tuscan water management system.

== Marriages and children ==
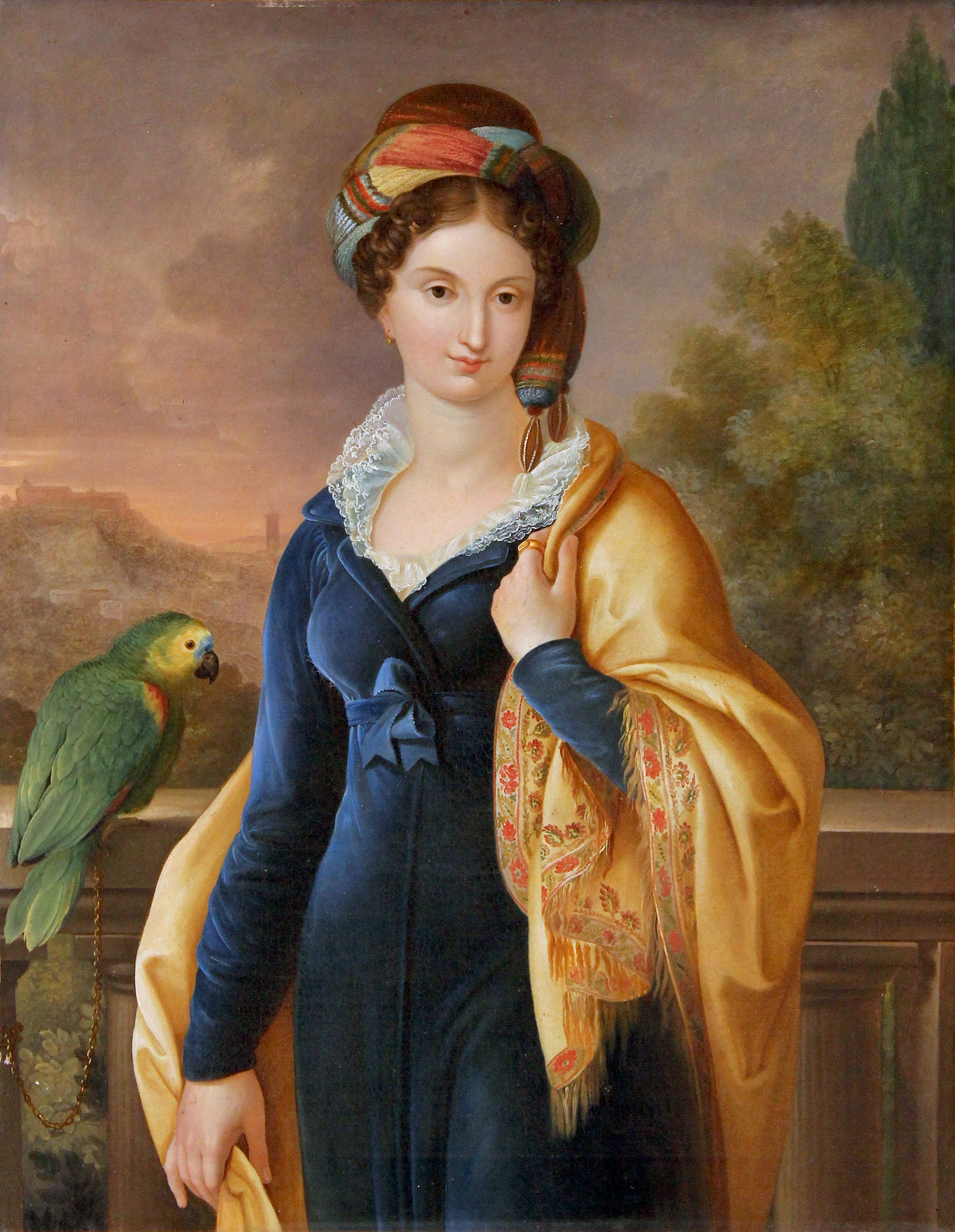
Maria Anna of Saxony

In Dresden on 28 October 1817, and by proxy in Florence on 16 November, Leopold married Princess Maria Anna of Saxony. She was the daughter of Maximilian, Prince of Saxony and Caroline of Bourbon-Parma. Her maternal grandparents were Ferdinand, Duke of Parma and Archduchess Maria Amalia of Austria. Leopold and his wife were second cousins as they were both great-grandchildren of Empress Maria Theresa of Austria. They had three daughters:

- Archduchess Caroline Augusta of Austria (Florence, 19 November 1822 – Florence, 5 October 1841)
- Archduchess Auguste Ferdinande of Austria (1 April 1825 – 26 April 1864); married Luitpold, Prince Regent of Bavaria.
- Archduchess Maria Maximiliana Thekla Johanna Josepha (Florence, 9 January 1827 – Florence, 18 May 1834)

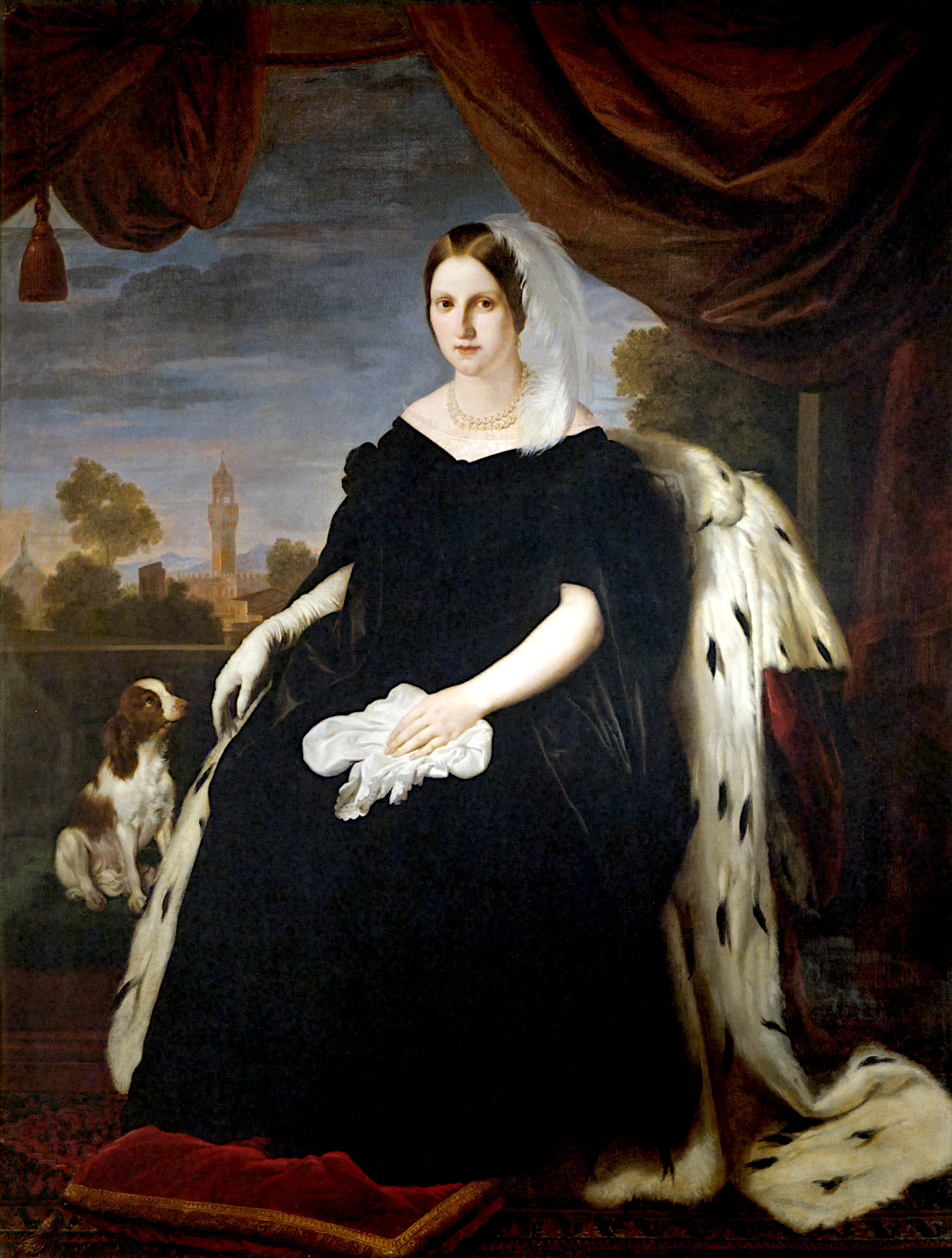
Maria Antonietta of Two Sicilies

Maria Anna died in Pisa on 24 April 1832. On 7 June 1833, in Naples, Leopold married Maria Antonietta of the Two Sicilies. His new wife was the second daughter of Francis I of the Two Sicilies and María Isabel of Spain. Marie Antoinette was his first cousin. They had ten children:

- Archduchess Maria Isabella Annunziata Giovanna Giuseppa Umilta Appolonia Philomena Virginia Gabriela (21 May 1834 – 14 July 1901); married her maternal uncle Prince Francis, Count of Trapani, youngest son of Francis I of the Two Sicilies and María Isabel of Spain.
- Ferdinand IV of Tuscany (10 June 1835 – 17 January 1908)
- Archduchess Maria Theresia Annunziata Johanna Josepha Paulina Luisa Virginia Apollonia Philomena (Florence, 29 June 1836 – Florence, 5 August 1838)
- Archduchess Maria Christina Annunziata Agatha Dorothea Johanna Josephina Luisa Philomena Anna (Florence, 5 February 1838 – Florence, 1 September 1849)
- Archduke Karl Salvator Maria Joseph Johann Baptist Philipp Jakob Märzius Ludwig (30 April 1839 – 18 January 1892); married Princess Maria Immaculata of Bourbon-Two Sicilies, second daughter of Ferdinand II of the Two Sicilies and Archduchess Maria Theresa of Austria.
- Archduchess Maria Anna Karoline Annunziata Johanna Josepha Gabriela Theresia Katharina Margarethe Philomena (Florence, 9 June 1840 – Florence, 13 August 1841)
- Archduke Rainer Salvator Maria Stephan Joseph Johann Philipp Jakob Antonin Zenobius Alois von Gonzaga (Florence, 1 May 1842 – Florence, 14 August 1844)
- Archduchess Maria Luisa Annunziata Anna Giovanna Giuseppa Antonietta Philomena Apollonia Tommasa (Florence, 31 October 1845 – 27 August 1917); married in Schloss Brandeis, Bohemia, on 31 May 1865 to Karl, Prince of Isenburg-Büdingen-Birstein. Her husband was the grandson of Karl, last sovereign Prince of Isenburg. They are the ancestors of Sophie, Princess of Prussia, wife of Georg Friedrich, Prince of Prussia, the head of the House of Hohenzollern.
- Archduke Ludwig Salvator Maria Joseph Johann Baptist Dominicus Rainerius Ferdinand Carl Zenobius Antonin (4 August 1847 – 12 October 1915)
- Archduke Johann Salvator Nepomuk Maria Annunziata Giuseppe Johann Batista Ferdinando Baldassare Luigi Gonzaga Pietro Alessandrino Zenobius Antonin (25 November 1852 – reported lost at sea in 1890); speculation of his survival under an alias (Johann Orth).

== Honours ==
- : Grand Duchy of Tuscany:
  - Grand Master of the Order of St. Joseph
  - Grand Master of the Military Order of St. Stephen
- Austrian Empire:
  - Knight of the Golden Fleece, 1810
  - Grand Cross of St. Stephen, 1838
- Belgium: Grand Cordon of the Order of Leopold, 1 October 1844
- Two Sicilies:
  - Knight of St. Januarius
  - Grand Cross of St. Ferdinand and Merit
- Duchy of Parma: Senator Grand Cross of the Constantinian Order of St. George, with Collar, 1851
- Kingdom of Saxony: Knight of the Rue Crown, 1817

== See also ==
- Tuscan Penal Code of 1853
- Unification of Italy

== Notes ==
Leopold II of Tuscany House of Habsburg Born: 3 October 1797 Died: 29 January 1870
Regnal titles
Preceded by Ferdinand III	Grand Duke of Tuscany; 1824–1849	Succeeded by Republic
Preceded by Republic	Grand Duke of Tuscany; 1849–1859	Succeeded by Ferdinand IV
