= Gasparo Martellini =

Italian painter

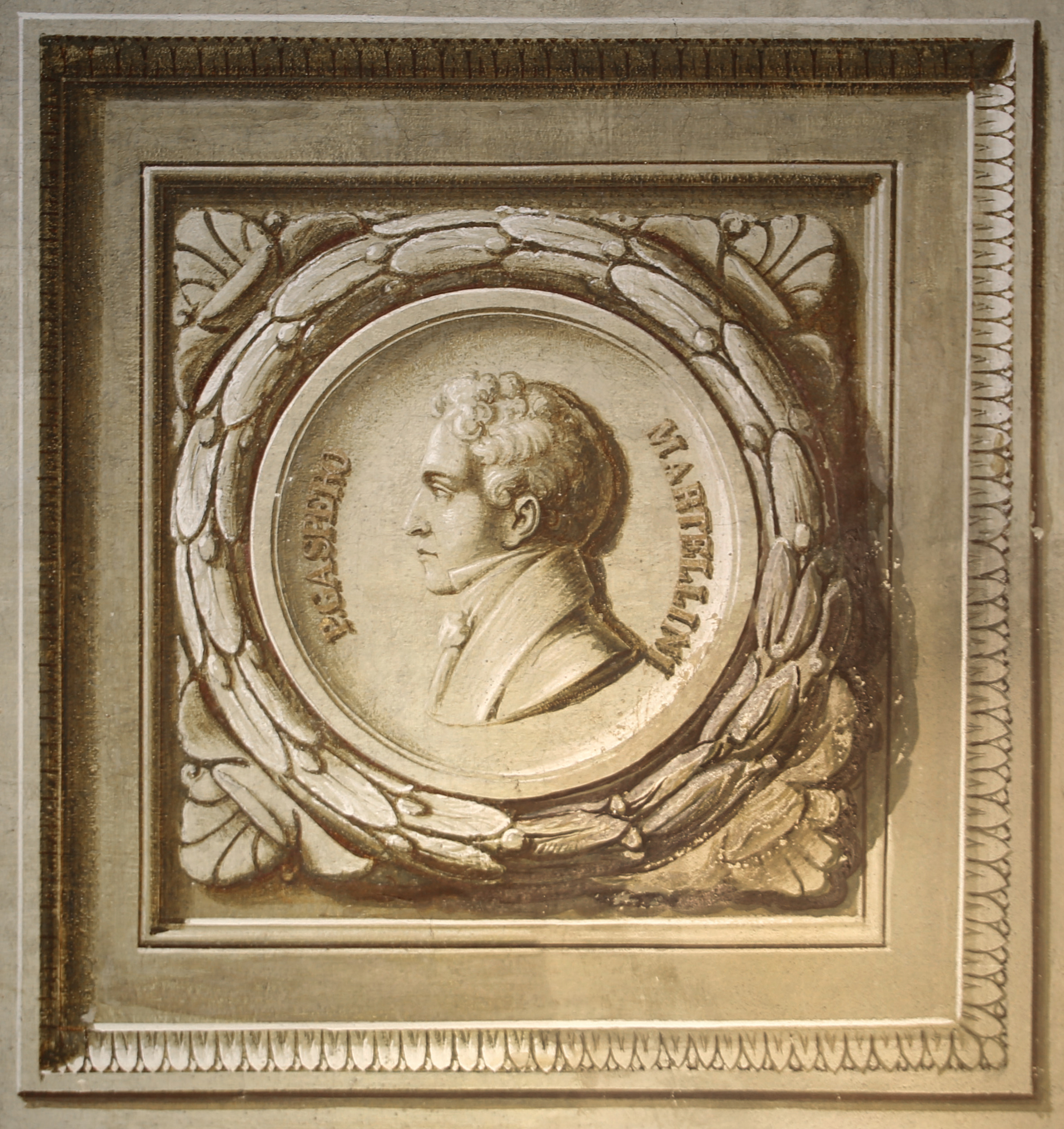
Gasparo Martellini

Gasparo Martellini (Florence, February 15, 1785 -October 20, 1857) was an Italian painter.

== Biography ==
He was a pupil of Pietro Benvenuti at the Academy of Fine Arts, Florence. He developed an affinity to the atavistic Purismo style of Lorenzo Bartolini.

He helped paint frescoes in the Hall of Ulysses in the Pitti Palace. The frescoes represent Ulysses returning to Ithaca. He painted in 1841 the lunette depicting Session of Experiments at the Accademia del Cimento for the Tribune of Galileo. For the Spinelli Chapel of the Church of Santa Croce, he painted lunettes and walls with Coronation of the Virgin and Church Militant and the prayer by Florence after the plague of 1633.

He also painted lunette with Sinite parvulos (Let the children come to me) for the portico of the Ospedale degli Innocenti, commissioned in 1843 by the architect Federico Pasqui.
