= Princess Maria Carlotta of Parma =

Princess of Parma (1777–1813)

Maria Carlotta of Parma
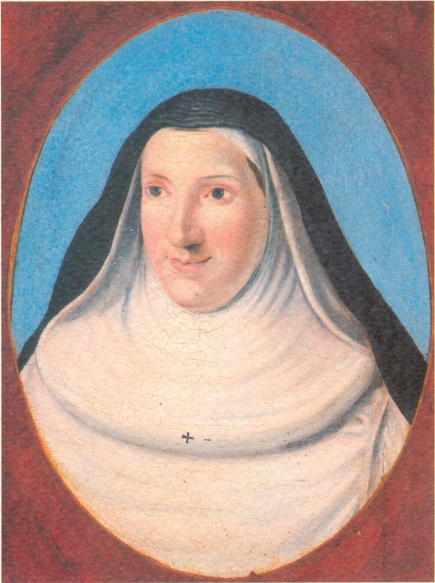
- Maria Carlotta as a nun
- Born: 1 September 1777; Ducal Garden Palace, Parma, Duchy of Parma
- Died: 6 April 1813 (aged 35); Church of Santi Domenico e Sisto, Rome, Italy
Names
- Italian: Maria Carlotta Ferdinanda Teresa Anna Giuseppa Giovanna Luisa Vincenza Rosalia di Borbone-Parma
- House: Bourbon-Parma
- Father: Ferdinand I, Duke of Parma
- Mother: Archduchess Maria Amalia of Austria
- Religion: Roman Catholicism

Maria Carlotta of Parma (Maria Carlotta Ferdinanda Teresa Anna Giuseppa Giovanna Luisa Vincenza Rosalia; Parma, Italy, 1 September 1777 – Rome, Italy, 6 April 1813) was a Princess of Parma and Infanta of Spain, daughter of Ferdinand I, Duke of Parma and Archduchess Maria Amalia of Austria. She joined the Dominican Order under the name of Sister Giacinta Domenica.

== Biography ==
=== Early years ===
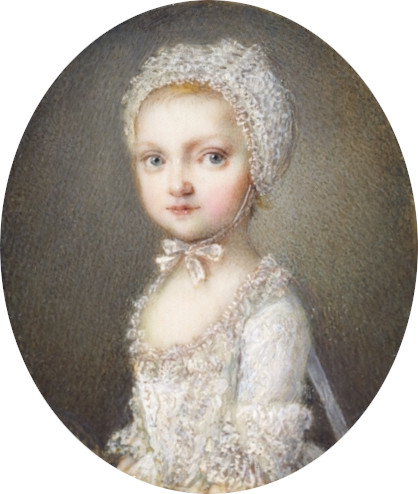
Princess Maria Carlotta as an infant, 1779.

Maria Carlotta was the fourth child of the nine children born to Ferdinand, Duke of Parma and his wife, Archduchess Maria Amalia of Austria, princess of Hungary and Bohemia. Her father Ferdinand was the only son of Philip, Duke of Parma and Princess Louise Élisabeth of France. In turn, Felipe was the son of King Philip V of Spain, and her mother Louise Élisabeth was one of the daughters of King Louis XV and Queen Marie Leczinska. Her mother, Maria Amalia, was a daughter of Empress Maria Theresa and Emperor Francis I.

Her mother and her aunt, Queen Maria Carolina, negotiated Carlotta's marriage with her first cousin Francis, Duke of Calabria. Francis was supposed to ask for the princess's hand when they were both 18 years old.

In 1795 the moment arrived, but Francis, due to his shyness, asked her mother to nullify the betrothal. She agreed to do so, and it became apparent that Carlotta would most likely become a nun.

=== French occupation ===
In 1796, Parma was occupied by France. Her parents were allowed to remain formally in power, but guarded by an entourage of French guards. Carlotta and her sister Maria Antonia were granted freedom, being considered apolitical. Both sisters remained by their side. parents as support during the French occupation, and were known to possess the religiosity of their father and the willpower of their mother. However, while Maria Antonia was described as particularly severe and reserved, Carlotta demanded from the French governor a pension to live up to her princess status.

=== Later life ===
On the death of their father in October 1802, both sisters and their mother attended his funeral. When her mother was exiled by the French after her funeral, they accompanied her to Prague, where they kept her company until her death in 1804. During her stay in Prague, she and her sister were described as humble and spent their time praying.

When she was 20 years old, she entered the Dominican Order under the name Sister Giacinta Domenica, beginning her novitiate in the Dominican convent of Parma. Her illustrious birth allowed her to go to the Colorno monastery where she became prioress. During the following years she led a quiet and modest life in the convent, where she died on April 6, 1813 at the age of 35.

== Ancestry ==
Ancestors of Princess Maria Carlotta of Parma

8. Philip V of Spain
4. Philip, Duke of Parma
9. Elisabeth of Parma
2. Ferdinand, Duke of Parma
10. Louis XV of France
5. Louise Élisabeth of France
11. Marie Leszczyńska
1. Maria Carlotta of Parma
12. Leopold, Duke of Lorraine
6. Francis I, Holy Roman Emperor
13. Élisabeth Charlotte of Orléans
3. Maria Amalia of Austria
14. Charles VI, Holy Roman Emperor
7. Maria Theresa of Austria
15. Elisabeth Christine of Brunswick

== Honorific distinctions ==
- Dame of the Order of Queen Maria Luisa from 1792.
