= Archduchess Amalie of Austria =

Archduchess Amalie of Austria may refer to:

- Archduchess Amalie Theresa of Austria (1807), daughter of Francis II, Holy Roman Emperor and Maria Teresa of the Two Sicilies
- Maria Amalia, Duchess of Parma (1746–1804), Princess of Hungary
