= Ferdinand I of Parma =

Duke of Parma, Piacenza and Guastalla from 1765 to 1802

Ferdinand I
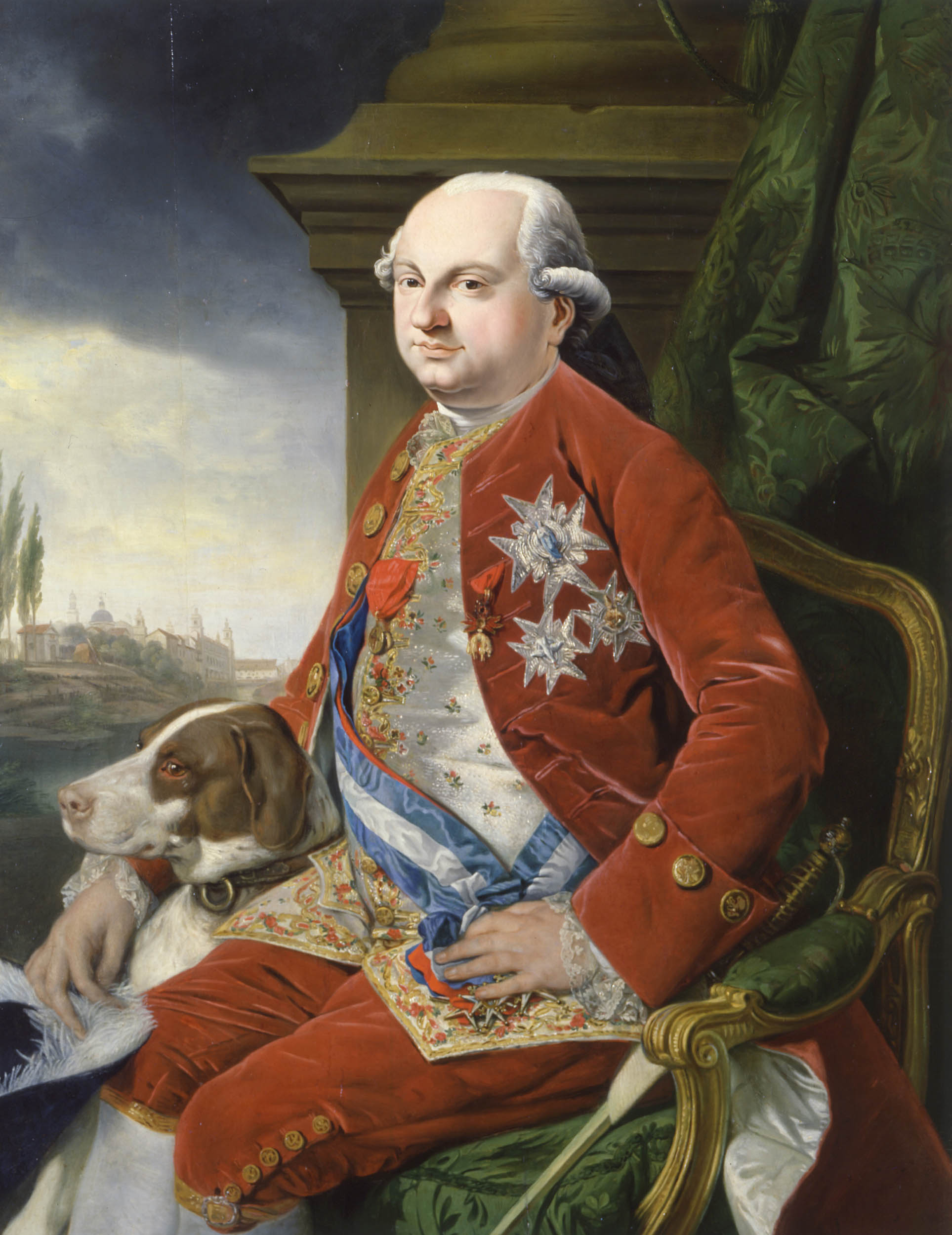
- Portrait by Johan Zoffany, 1779

Duke of Parma, Piacenza and Guastalla
- Reign: 18 July 1765 – 9 October 1802
- Predecessor: Philip
- Successors: Jean-Jacques-Régis (Parma); Charles-François (Piacenza); Pauline (Guastalla)
- Born: 20 January 1751; Parma, Duchy of Parma
- Died: 9 October 1802 (aged 51); Fontevivo, Duchy of Parma
- Burial: Sanctuary of Santa Maria della Steccata
- Spouse: Archduchess Maria Amalia of Austria (m. 1769)
- Issue: Carolina, Princess Maximilian of Saxony; Louis I, King of Etruria; Princess Maria Antonia; Princess Maria Carlotta; Prince Philip Maria; Princess Antonietta Luisa; Princess Maria Luisa
Names
- Italian: Ferdinando Maria Filippo Lodovico Sebastiano Francesco Giacomo di Borbone; French: Ferdinand-Marie-Philippe-Louis-Sébastien-François-Jacques de Bourbon
- House: Bourbon-Parma
- Father: Philip, Duke of Parma
- Mother: Louise-Élisabeth of France
- Religion: Roman Catholicism

Ferdinand I (Ferdinando Maria Filippo Lodovico Sebastiano Francesco Giacomo; 20 January 1751 – 9 October 1802) was Duke of Parma, Piacenza and Guastalla from his father's death on 18 July 1765 until he ceded the duchy to France by the Treaty of Aranjuez on 20 March 1801. He was a member of the House of Bourbon-Parma.

== Early life ==
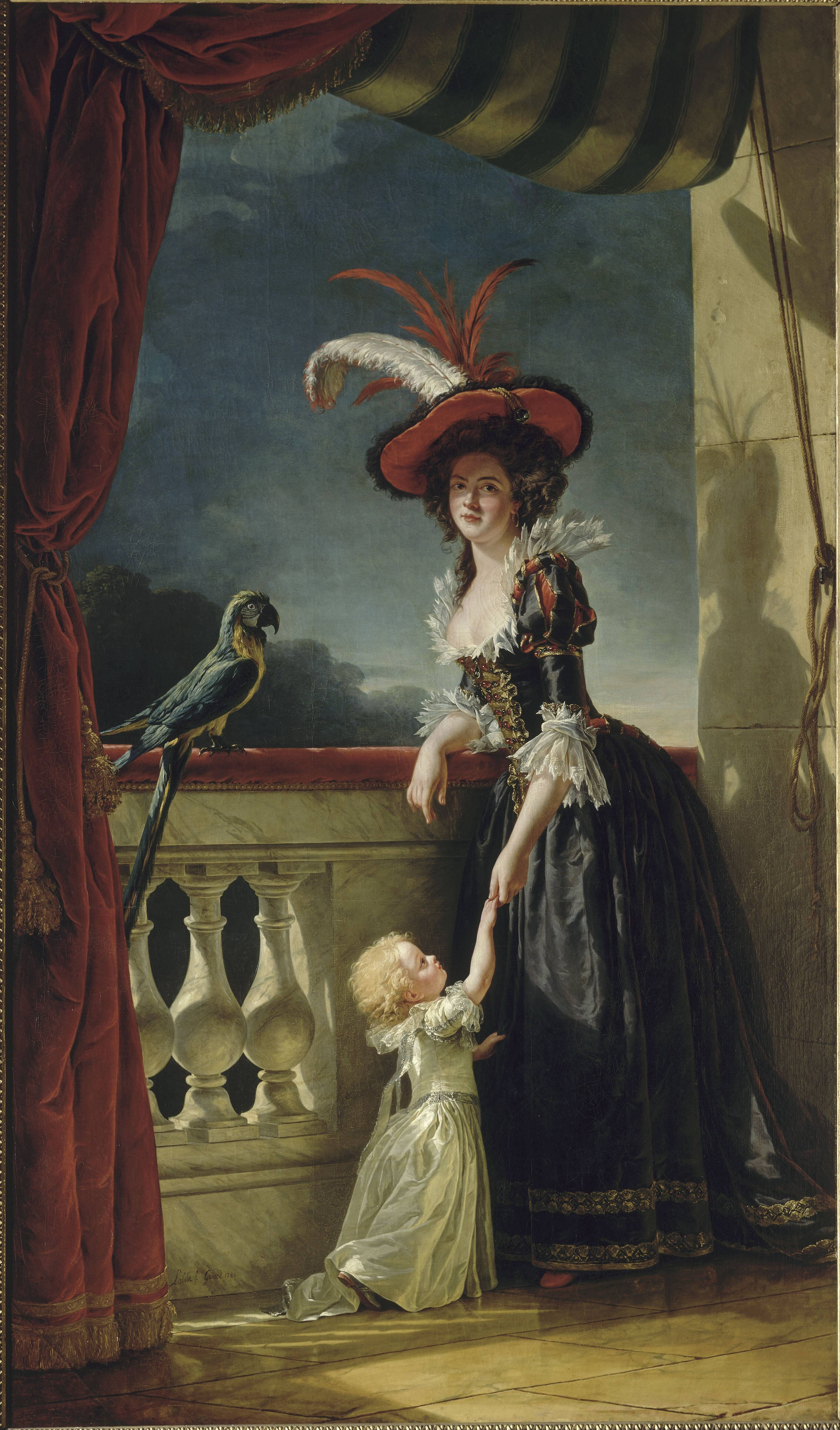
Louise-Élisabeth and her son Ferdinand (portrait by Adélaïde Labille-Guiard, 1788)

Born at the Ducal Palace of Colorno as the second child and the only son of Philip, Duke of Parma and Princess Louise-Élisabeth of France, he was considered to be the favorite grandson of his maternal grandfather King Louis XV and his popular wife Queen Marie Leszczyńska. As a grandson in the male line of King Philip V of Spain, he was created an infante of Spain upon his father's death. As the heir to one of the largest collections of sovereign duchies, Ferdinand was an attractive candidate for many royal women of Europe.

Possible candidates included Maria Beatrice d'Este, daughter of Ercole III d'Este, Duke of Modena, and (like Ferdinand) an in law of Marie Antoinette. She was, through her mother, heiress to the Duchy of Massa and Carrara, but despite being the last descendant of the house of Este, she was not the heiress to the Duchy of Modena and Reggio due to the Salic law that was in force there. Ferdinand's marriage to Princess Maria Beatrice, however, was probably little more than a wishful thinking of Parma's minister, Guillaume du Tillot, considering that she had been engaged from early childhood to the third-born heir of the House of Habsburg-Lorraine. Another candidate was Bathilde d'Orléans, who offered a very large dowry; she was the only surviving daughter of Louis Philippe I, Duke of Orléans, and the sister of Philippe-Égalité.

The decision of who his future spouse would be was sealed by his mother's close correspondence with the powerful Empress Maria Theresa of Austria, who had promised Ferdinand's parents the throne of the Netherlands, which had been returned to Austrian rule under the Treaty of Aix-la-Chapelle. This never occurred and, as a result, an alliance with the Habsburg Empire was used to cement the two nations.

At the age of nine, Ferdinand began taking harpsichord lessons with the composer Giuseppe Colla.

== Marriage ==
Guillaume du Tillot was again used during Ferdinand's reign when he lost his father in 1765 at age 14. Negotiations and ideas were passed from Vienna to Parma, and in 1769 Ferdinand was to marry Archduchess Maria Amalia of Austria; the eighth child of the Empress, and elder sister of the Queen of Naples and Sicily, and also of the future Queen of France. They had been married by proxy in Vienna on 27 June and Maria Amalia left her home on 1 July. The duchess would meet her husband at Mantua on 16 July. His wife was with her brother Joseph II, Holy Roman Emperor and Ferdinand with members of the Sforza family. On 19 July there was a formal ceremony for all at the Ducal Palace of Colorno where Ferdinand had been born. During many festivities, the couple made their official entrance to Parma on 24 July. They had nine children in just under twenty years.

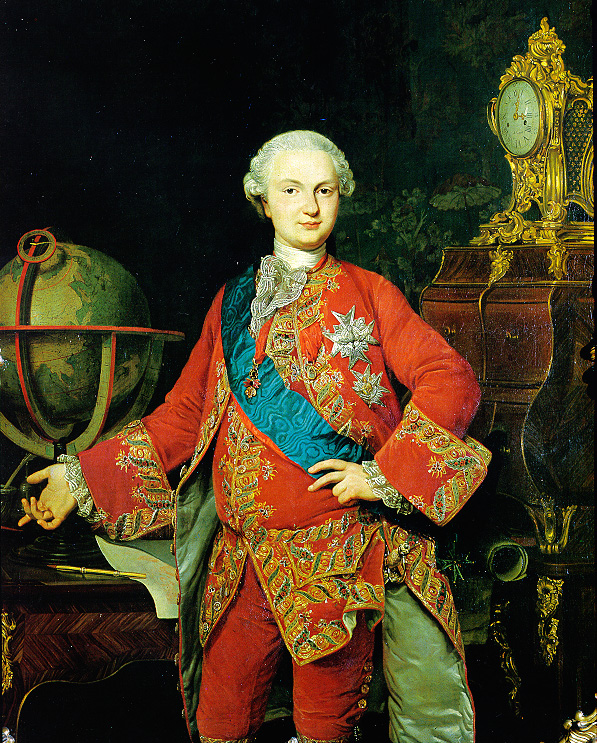
A portrait of Ferdinand (c. 1765–69). The portrait is formally attributed to Giuseppe Baldrighi, however, it was painted by Pietro Melchiorre Ferrari

== Reign ==
Expelling the Jesuits, abolishing the jurisdiction of the Inquisition within his domains, and suppressing many redundant monasteries, Ferdinand has sometimes been classed among the more minor exponents of Enlightened absolutism.

Ferdinand ceded the Duchy of Parma to France in the Treaty of Aranjuez. The treaty was signed on 21 March 1801 between France and Spain. The overall accord confirmed the terms presented in the Treaty of San Ildefonso. Moreover, Ferdinand agreed to surrender the Duchy of Parma, Piacenza, and Guastalla to France. Ferdinand's son Louis received the territory of the Grand Duchy of Tuscany, which by that point had been named the Kingdom of Etruria. Ferdinand III, Grand Duke of Tuscany, had been compensated with secularized territories of the Prince-Archbishopric of Salzburg that became the new Electorate of Salzburg.

Ferdinand I died in Parma at age 51, suspected to be poisoned, although French authorities cited another reason for his death, and was buried in the church of Fontevivo Abbey. On his deathbed, however, he named a regency council with his wife Maria Amalia as its head, clearly still opposing the terms of the Treaty of Aranjuez regarding his duchy. The regency lasted only for a few days and the Duchy of Parma was annexed to France.

== Issue ==
Ferdinand and his wife Maria Amalia had nine children:

1. Princess Carolina (22 November 1770 – 1 March 1804); married in 1792 to Maximilian, Crown Prince of Saxony and had eight children.
2. Prince Louis (5 July 1773 – 27 May 1803); married in 1795 to his cousin, Princess Maria Luisa of Spain, and they had two children. Louis became the first King of Etruria.
3. Princess Maria Antonia (28 November 1774 – 20 February 1841); she was engaged to a prince of the House of Savoy but he died and she became a Ursuline nun in 1803 with the name of Sister Luisa Maria.
4. Princess Maria Carlotta (1 September 1777 – 6 April 1813); she became a Dominican nun in 1797 with the name of Sister Giacinta Domenica.
5. Prince Philip Maria (22 May 1783 – 2 July 1786); died at the age of three years due to scurvy.
6. Princess Maria Antonietta Luisa (21 October 1784 – 22 October 1785); died at the age of one year due to smallpox.
7. Princess Maria Luisa (17 April 1787 – 22 November 1789); died at the age of two due to pleurisy.
8. Stillborn son and daughter (21 May 1789).

== Ancestry ==
Ancestors of Ferdinand I of Parma

8. Louis, Dauphin of France
4. Philip V of Spain
9. Maria Anna Victoria of Bavaria
2. Philip, Duke of Parma
10. Odoardo Farnese, Hereditary Prince of Parma
5. Elisabeth Farnese
11. Dorothea Sophie of Neuburg
1. Ferdinand, Duke of Parma
12. Louis, Duke of Burgundy
6. Louis XV of France
13. Marie Adélaïde of Savoy
3. Louise-Élisabeth of France
14. Stanisław Leszczyński, King of Poland
7. Marie Leszczyńska
15. Katarzyna Opalińska

Ferdinand I of Parma Bourbon of Parma Cadet branch of the House of Capet Born: 20 January 1751 Died: 9 October 1802
Regnal titles
Preceded by Philip	Duke of Parma, Piacenza and Guastalla; 1765–1802	Vacant Annexed by French Republic Title next held by Marie Louise as sovereign duchess
