= Princess Maria Antonia of Parma =

Parmese royal (1774-1841)

Maria Antonia of Parma
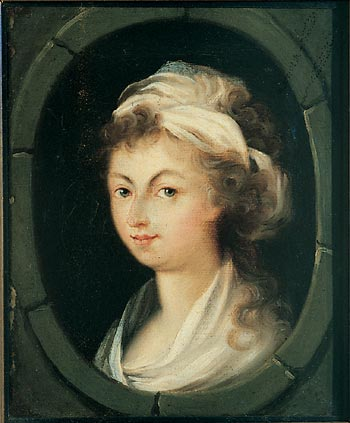
- Portrait attributed to Vieira Portuense, 1794
- Born: 28 November 1774; Parma, Duchy of Parma
- Died: 20 February 1841 (aged 66); Rome, Papal States
Names
- Italian: Maria Antonia Giuseppa Walburga Anna Luisa Vicenza Margherita Caterina
- House: Bourbon-Parma
- Father: Ferdinand I, Duke of Parma
- Mother: Maria Amalia of Austria
- Religion: Roman Catholicism

Maria Antonia of Parma (Maria Antonia Giuseppa Walburga Anna Luisa Vicenza Margherita Caterina; 28 November 1774 – 20 February 1841) was a Princess of Parma, daughter of Duke Ferdinand I, Duke of Parma, and Archduchess Maria Amalia of Austria.

== Biography ==
Maria Antonia grew up with her brother and sisters in the ducal court of Parma, where she was affectionately known as Tognina. Contrary to what has been frequently stated, she was not named after her aunt, Queen Marie Antoinette of France, who was not her godmother. Maria Antonia's godparents were her uncle, Emperor Joseph II, and her father's aunt, Maria Antonia of Spain, Queen of Sardinia, after whom the princess was named.

She was a gifted painter and received her training from Giuseppe Baldrighi and Domenico Muzzi, both court painters and professors of the Academy of Fine Arts of Parma.

In 1796, Parma was occupied by France. While their parents were allowed to formally remain on their throne but were watched by an entourage of French guards, Maria Antonia and her sister Carlotta were awarded their freedom as they were regarded apolitical. The sisters remained by the side of their parents as their support during the French occupation: they were both regarded to have the religiosity of their father and the willpower of their mother. However, while Carlotta was imposing enough for the French governor Andoche Junot to recommend that she be acknowledged a Princess by France and awarded a pension to be able to live according to her status, Maria Antonia was described as particularly severe and reserved. At the death of their father in October 1802, the sisters and their mother participated in his official state funeral. When their mother was exiled by the French after the funeral, they accompanied her to Prague, where they kept her company until her death. During their stay in Prague, she and her sister were described as humble and forgotten, passing their time in prayer.

A quiet person, Maria Antonia never married and became an Ursuline novice in 1802. The following year, on 22 April 1803, she officially received the habit of an Ursuline nun and changed her name to Sister Louise Marie (Luigia Maria). After the death of her mother in 1804, her sister moved to Rome. Maria Antonie remained in Prague until the fall of Napoleon, after which she returned to Parma.

During the following years she led a quiet and modest life in the Ursuline convent in Parma. After many years of living there, on 9 May 1831, she moved to the Convent of St Agatha in Rome, where she died in 1841.

== Ancestry ==
Ancestors of Princess Maria Antonia of Parma

8. Philip V of Spain
4. Philip, Duke of Parma
9. Elisabeth of Parma
2. Ferdinand, Duke of Parma
10. Louis XV of France
5. Louise-Élisabeth of France
11. Marie Leszczyńska
1. Maria Antonia of Parma
12. Leopold, Duke of Lorraine
6. Francis I, Holy Roman Emperor
13. Élisabeth Charlotte d'Orléans
3. Maria Amalia of Austria
14. Charles VI, Holy Roman Emperor
7. Maria Theresa of Austria
15. Elisabeth Christine of Brunswick
