= Madame Louise-Elisabeth, Duchess of Parma - The Earth =

Oil painting by Jean-Marc Nattier

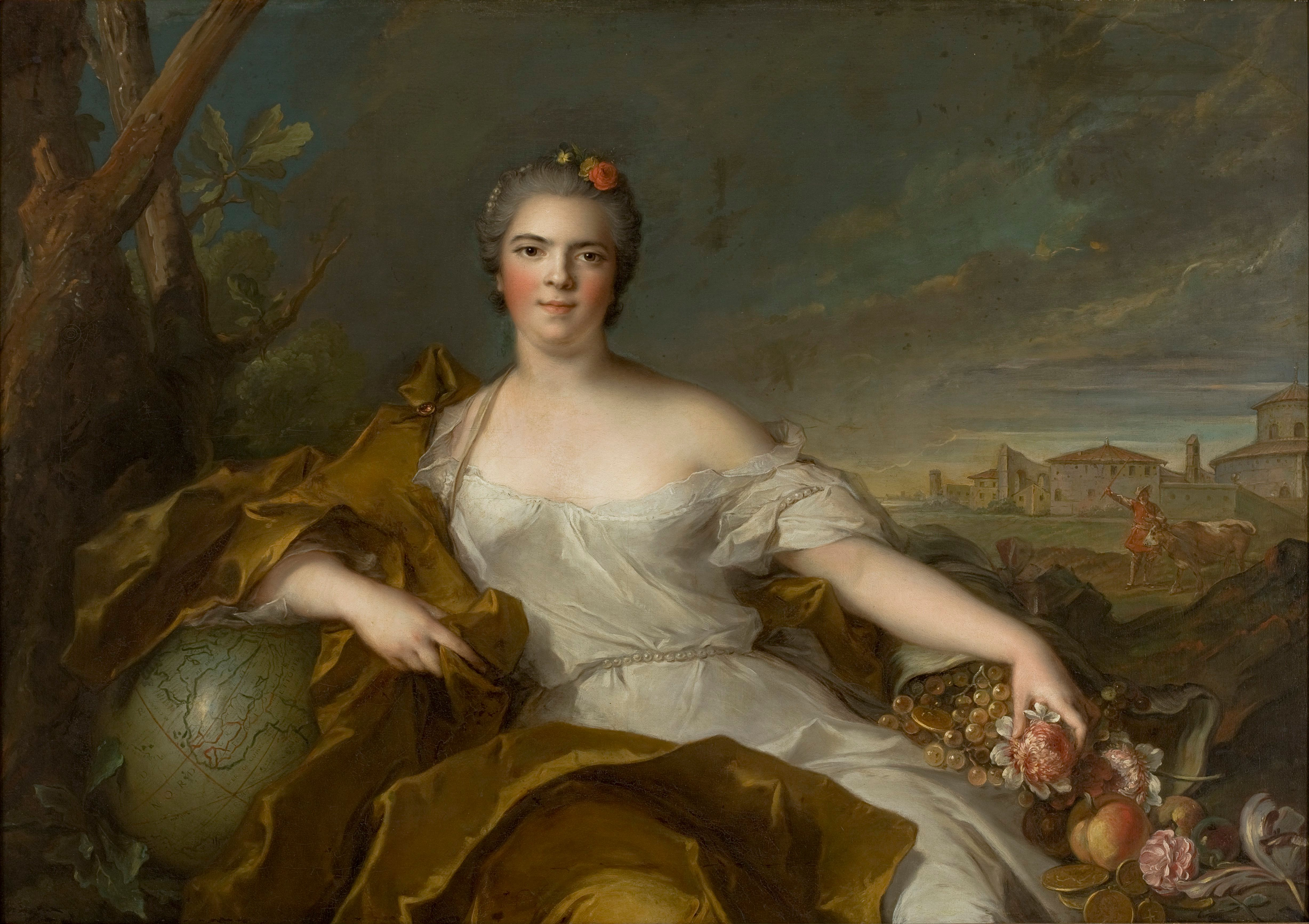
- Artist: Jean-Marc Nattier
- Year: 1750
- Medium: oil on canvas
- Dimensions: 97 × 136.4cm
- Location: São Paulo Museum of Art, São Paulo

Madame Louise Elisabeth, Duchess of Parma – The Earth (in French: Madame Louise-Élisabeth de France, duchesse de Parme – La Terre) or Louise Elisabeth of France, as the element of Earth, is an oil on canvas painting by the French painter Jean-Marc Nattier, from 1750.

== History and description ==
It is one of four paintings in the series of the Mesdames of France, daughters of King Louis XV, portrayed as the four elements: Louise-Elisabeth as Earth; Henriette-Anne as Fire; Marie Adélaïde as Air; and Victoire as Water. The works decorated a room in the Palace of Versailles, the residence of the French court at the time.

Located at the São Paulo Museum of Art, Brazil, the painting, along with its series, was acquired in 1952 using funds from the National Congress of Brazil during the museum's establishment.

Interestingly, Louise Elisabeth was the only daughter of Louis XV to marry — in 1765, she united with the Infante Philip of Spain, who later became Duke of Parma. Her descendants would end up having a direct connection with Brazilian history; Louise Elisabeth was the mother of Maria Luisa of Parma, Queen of Spain, who in turn was the mother of Carlota Joaquina of Spain, Queen of Portugal, Brazil and the Algarves, mother of Dom Pedro, the first emperor of Brazil.

== Description ==
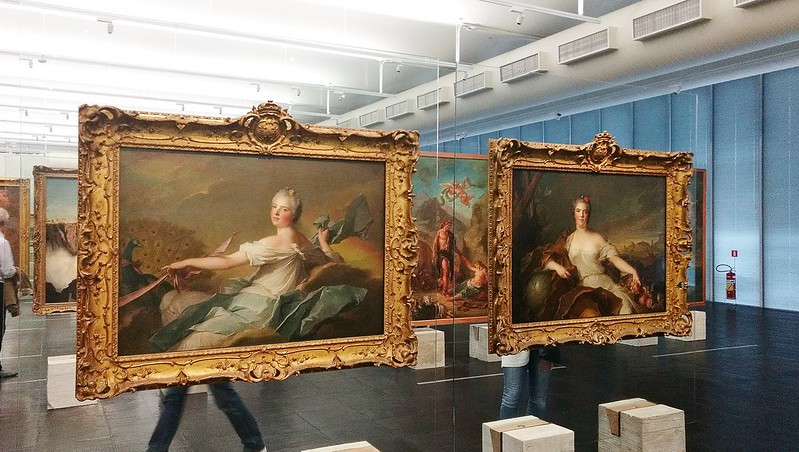
The piece of work (right) in exhibition at São Paulo Museum of Art, Brazil

The painting portrays the princess (Note: Technically, the daughters of French kings during the Ancien Régime were never princesses; they held the title of Fille de France (Daughter of France) and the style Mesdame (Madame). In the case of Louise Elisabeth, being the eldest daughter of the French monarch, she bore the traditional title of Madame Royale, reserved for the king’s eldest daughters.) Louise-Élisabeth of France in a classical pose, alluding to her dominion over the Earth. She is adorned with a flowing white dress and a draped golden fabric, with her hair decorated with flowers. Her left hand rests on a terrestrial globe, symbolizing the Earth, while her right hand holds a cornucopia filled with fruits and coins, representing abundance and prosperity. The background features a pastoral scene with a figure herding cattle, which may reinforce the princess's connection with the land and generosity. The sky, in shades of blue and clouds, may evoke the perception of nature as something in constant transformation.
