= Maria Amalia, Duchess of Parma =

Duchess of Parma, Piacenza and Guastalla from 1771 to 1796

Maria Amalia
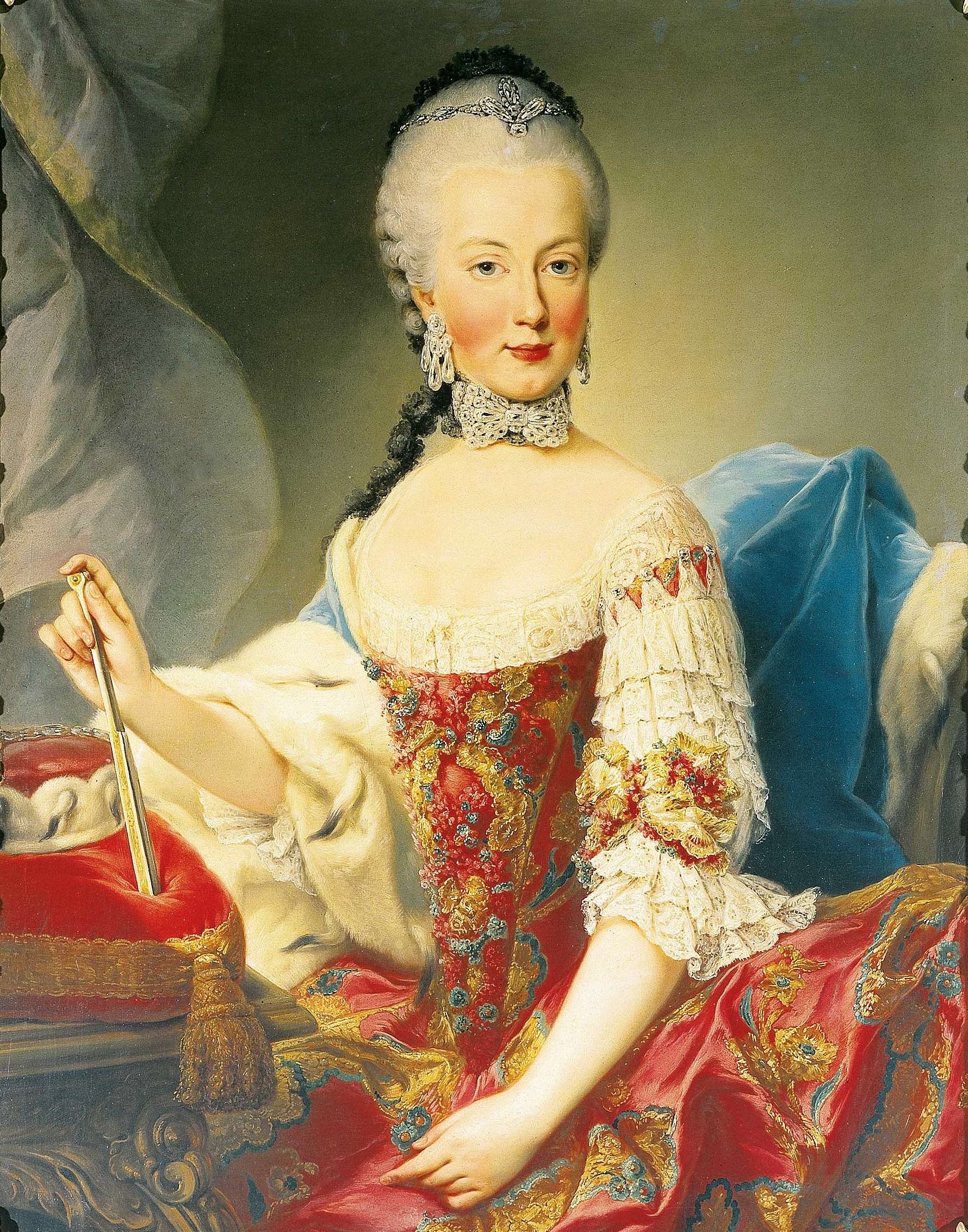
- Maria Amalia, probably by Martin van Meytens; 1760s

Duchess consort of Parma, Piacenza and Guastalla
- Tenure: 19 July 1769 – 9 October 1802
- Born: 26 February 1746; Hofburg, Vienna, Archduchy of Austria, Holy Roman Empire
- Died: 18 June 1804 (aged 58); Prague Castle, Prague, Kingdom of Bohemia, Holy Roman Empire
- Burial: St. Vitus Cathedral, Prague
- Spouse: Ferdinand I, Duke of Parma (m. 1769; died 1802)
- Issue among others...: Carolina, Princess of Saxony; Louis I of Etruria; Princess Maria Antonia; Princess Maria Carlotta
Names
- German: Maria Amalia Josepha Johanna Antonia; Italian: Maria Amalia Giuseppa Giovanna Antonia; French: Marie Amélie Josèphe Jeanne Antoinette
- House: Habsburg-Lorraine
- Father: Francis I, Holy Roman Emperor
- Mother: Maria Theresa

Maria Amalia (Maria Amalia Josepha Johanna Antonia; 26 February 1746 – 18 June 1804) was duchess of Parma, Piacenza and Guastalla by marriage to Ferdinand I, Duke of Parma. She was born an archduchess of Austria as the daughter of Empress Maria Theresa and Emperor Francis I. Upon her arrival in Parma in 1769 until the death of her husband in 1802, she was the de facto ruler of the duchy. Between the 9th and 22st of October 1802, she served as official regent of Parma after the death of her husband.

== Early life ==
Maria Amalia, known as Amélie, was born on 26 February 1746, in the Hofburg in Vienna, Austria, as the eighth child of Maria Theresa, ruler of the Habsburg monarchy, and Francis I, Holy Roman Emperor. She grew up in and near Vienna, in the Hofburg during the winters, and Schönbrunn Palace and Laxenburg castles during the summer.

=== Education ===
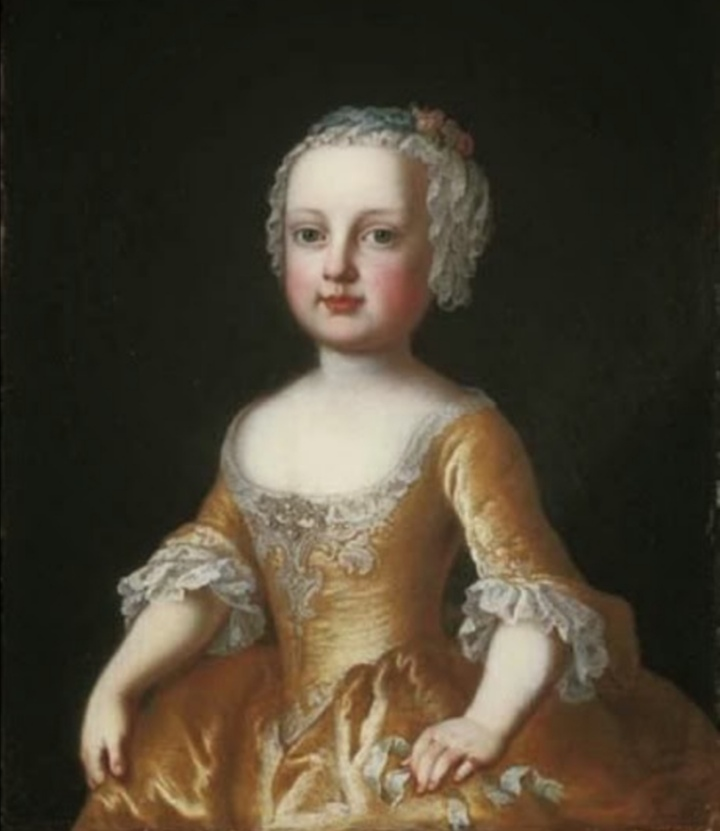
Maria Amalia aged ~4 (portrait by Martin van Meytens and workshop, c. 1750)

The sixteen children of Maria Theresa were raised in same-sex groups of two based on age, but as Maria Amalia was born between two boys, she grew up almost as an only child. She was raised to be the ideal consort and taught arts and how to be obedient, dutiful and representative. As a child, she was intelligent, but reserved and stubborn, considered difficult. She showed an interest in hunting early on, and her father took her on his hunting trips from the age of six. She developed a life-long passion for this sport, as well as for nature and animals.

Like her siblings, she was regularly interviewed by their mother, with whom she had a contentious relationship. Of all her daughters, Maria Theresa seems to have had the worst relationship with Maria Amalia. When she debuted as an adult in the society life in Vienna, she was a success because of her beauty. One of her paintings, St. Therese and the child Jesus, still exists today in a private collection.

== Marriage ==
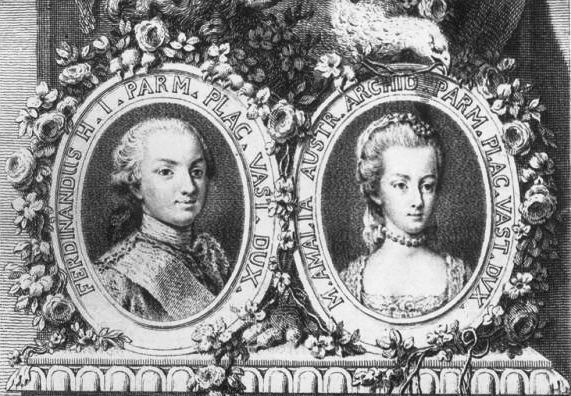
Maria Amalia and her husband, Ferdinand I

By early adulthood, Maria Amalia became a strong, independent young woman who cared little for her mother's personal and political plans. In 1767, she fell in love with Prince Charles of Zweibrücken. He was heir presumptive of the Palatine Zweibrücken, the Electoral Palatinate, and the Electorate of Bavaria, but Maria Theresa and her chancellor, Prince Kaunitz still considered him a bad match and refused his proposal. Maria Amalia protested, but was forced to accept her fate.

During this time, there were already negotiations with King Charles III of Spain, about Maria Amalia's marriage to the king's cousin, Ferdinand I, Duke of Parma. The empress hoped to strengthen her Italian influence by this union. The marriage was supported by Maria Amalia's eldest brother, the future Joseph II, Holy Roman Emperor, whose first, beloved wife had been Ferdinand's sister, Princess Isabella of Parma. The marriage was part of a series of unions between daughters of Maria Theresa to members of the House of Bourbon.

Ferdinand was five years younger than Maria Amalia, described as rude, obstinate, and debauched, but also bigoted in his Catholicism. His favourite pastimes were ringing church bells and roasting chestnuts with peasants. When Maria Amalia learned more about her groom, she was devastated. Maria Theresa promised her a splendid dowry and an annuity from the Spanish court, but the bride remained opposed to the match. The wedding, planned for the end of 1768, had to be postponed several times as Pope Clement XIII refused to issue the necessary dispensation because of his disputes with House of Bourbon. When he died in February 1769, his successor, Clement XIV authorised the marriage immediately. The proxy wedding was celebrated in June 1769 in Vienna, and the groom was represented by Maria Amalia's younger brother Ferdinand. The bride appeared tired and stressed during the celebrations, worrying Maria Theresa. Maria Amalia never forgave her mother for forcing her into this marriage.

== Duchess of Parma ==
Arms of Maria Amalia of Austria as Duchess of Parma

Maria Amalia left Austria on 1 July 1769, accompanied by her brother, Joseph II, and married Ferdinand on 19 July, at the Ducal Palace of Colorno. She was instructed by her mother to be submissive, obedient, adapt to local customs, and never interfere with politics.

The Duchy of Parma was ruled more or less as a French puppet state by Minister Guillaume du Tillot. Du Tillot kept Ferdinand out of politics, and was favored by his maternal grandfather, Louis XV of France. A letter of Louis XV to his grandson from May 1769 attests to this, counseling his grandson not to despise the minister who served his parents well, as there was no one to replace him. Maria Amalia's marriage had been arranged by Austria and Spain to end the pro-French policy in Parma and replace it with an Austrian and Spanish one. Upon her arrival, Maria Amalia was expected to submit to the wishes of du Tillot, who regarded her with suspicion, immediately causing conflict.

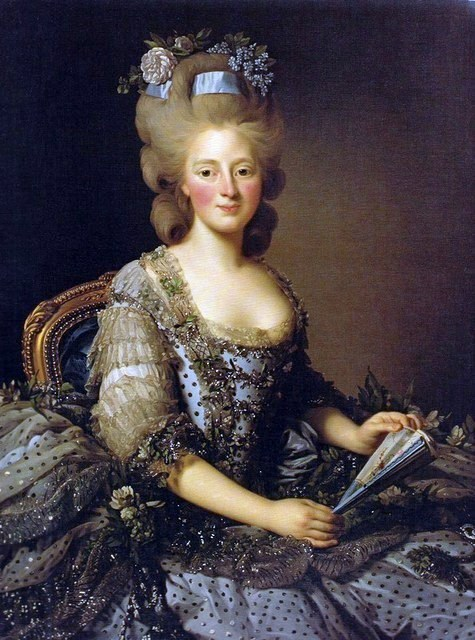
Maria Amalia as duchess of Parma on a portrait by Alexander Roslin

In 1771, two years after her arrival in Parma, Maria Amalia secured the dismissal of du Tillot and replaced him with the Spaniard Jose del Llano, was highly recommended by the paternal uncle of Ferdinand, Charles III of Spain. In 1772, Maria Amalia fired del Llano and replaced him with an Italian prime minister and a cabinet of native Parmesans loyal to her rather than to a foreign ruler. This way, she secured that Parma would not become a Spanish puppet state. Duke Ferdinand, happy to spend his life with religious observance and raising his children, left the affairs of state entirely to his wife. After the cabinet change, Maria Amalia was therefore the de facto ruler of Parma.

In 1773, her mother Empress Maria Theresa tasked Count Franz Xaver Wolfgang of Orsini-Rosenberg (1723–1796), her ambassador to Parma, to act as Maria Amalia's adviser. Maria Amalia, however, told Rosenberg that she no longer wished to receive letters from Vienna or from Madrid. After this, the diplomatic ties with Austria and Spain were cut.

As the ruler of Parma, Maria Amalia was referred to by the public as La Mata or La Signora, 'The Lady'. She defended the independence of the Duchy of Parma, strengthened its sense of nationality, supported art, culture, and literature, working efficiently with her ministerial cabinet. Ferdinand did not have political influence, and she openly changed and contradicted his orders and had him sign state documents for her, including her name in his orders as if they were co-rulers.

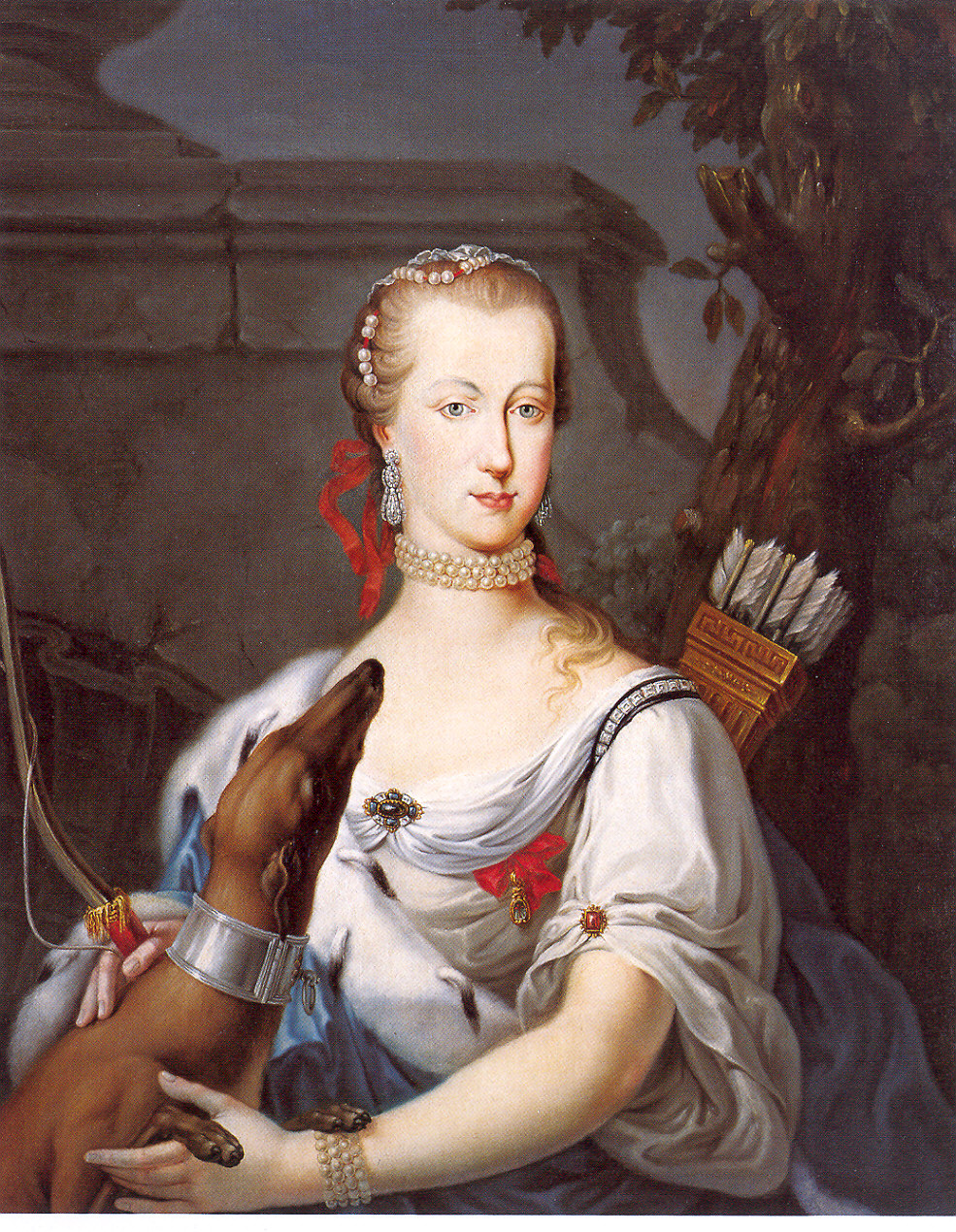
Maria Amalia as Diana on Carlo Angelo dal Verme's portrait, currently displayed at the Galleria nazionale di Parma

From the beginning, Maria Amalia caused a scandal with her personal lifestyle. She made no effort to conceal her displeasure with her husband or her new circumstances. She used the funds from her mother for her wardrobe, a grand court and parties; she replaced most of her ladies-in-waiting with an entourage of handsome men from the royal guards; she cross-dressed as male, spent her nights unaccompanied and incognito on the streets, gambled in the officers' club and, while Ferdinand took mistresses from the peasantry, she enjoyed affairs with members of his guard. All of this became a worry for her mother, who feared that Maria Amalia would stain the reputation of her sisters, especially that of the youngest, Maria Antonia, whom Maria Theresa wanted to marry to the dauphin of France.

Maria Amalia never established a good relationship with her husband, but they were both described as loving parents. She was greatly disliked by the Parmesan nobility, who described her as a shameful Messalina and blamed her for living a life of imperial luxury in such a small state. In turn, she considered them mostly useless and not beneficial to the interests of Parma. She was, however, popular among the public for her generosity toward the poor; at her famous gala parties in Colorno, she had tables set up for both noble and poor guests who enjoyed the same meals.

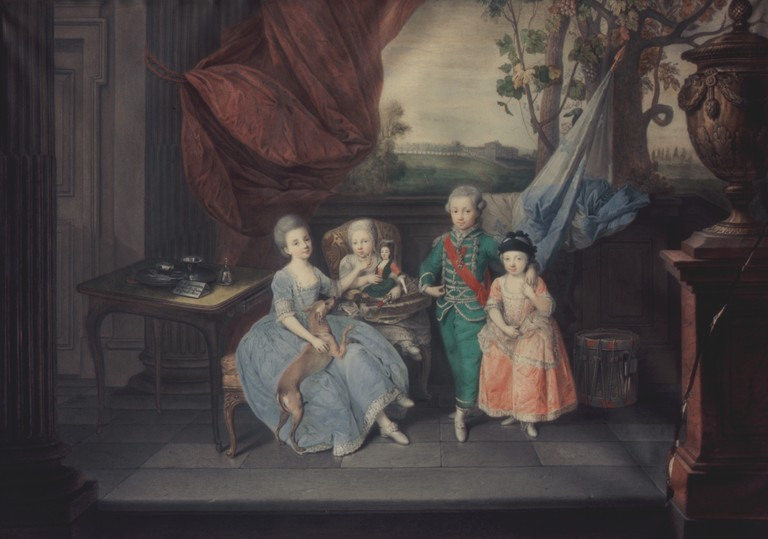
Maria Amalia's children in 1779 on a painting by Johan Zoffany, commissioned by Maria Theresa

Maria Amalia would remain largely estranged from her mother, except for a brief reconciliation in 1773 when her first son was born, despite her mother's repeated efforts at reconciliation. The duchess resisted her mother's efforts to control her from afar. When her sister Maria Christina, Duchess of Teschen, and her husband, Albert of Saxony, Duke of Teschen, visited her in Parma in 1776, after several years of not seeing each other, Prince Albert wrote in his journal the following about Maria Amalia: "The Infanta was so changed that I did not recognize her. No trace remained of that glamour, that beauty that was once admired in her; her beautiful waist had disappeared, and her dress and gait contributed even more to disfiguring her." Maria Amalia was in touch with her younger sisters Marie Antoinette, Queen of France, and Maria Carolina, Queen of Naples and Sicily, for most of their married lives. The three sisters exchanged letters, portraits and gifts; one of Marie Antoinette's last letters during her imprisonment was written to Maria Amalia. However, her conflicts with their mother put a strain on her relationship with her siblings.

In 1778, her eldest son, Prince Louis, injured himself by banging his head into a marble table while playing with his sister. He recovered from a serious concussion, but after this, he suffered from epileptic seizures and was often confused. This crisis contributed to an improvement in the relationship between Maria Amalia and Ferdinand. During the 1780s, Ferdinand was also more interested in state affairs, and the welfare of Parma became another common interest which made their relationship more cordial.

== Later life ==
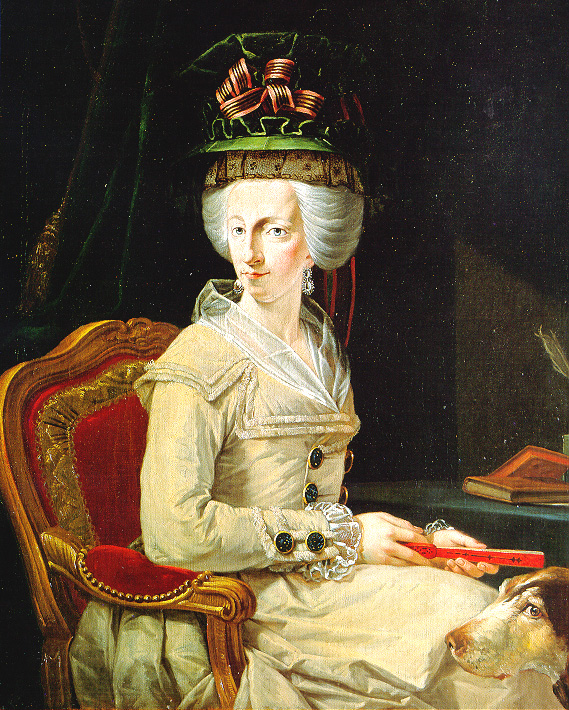
Maria Amalia on a portrait by Domenico Muzzi, currently displayed at the Galleria nazionale di Parma

In May 1796, during the French invasion of Italy under Napoleon Bonaparte, the Duchy of Parma was invaded by French troops. Maria Amalia detested the French after the execution of her sister Marie Antoinette, and she never recovered. At the news of the execution of her sister, she fell unconscious, and her daughter Carolina later wrote:

"At the news of the death of her beloved sister, my very good aunt, my mother laughed at first, then began to cry, screamed that whoever killed her sister, a good and sensitive person, would have been burned alive. Then her face turned pale and her thin body fell to the ground. That was the only time I saw my mother lose control."

Maria Amalia never fully recovered from Marie Antoinette's death, and she spent the rest of her life in mourning. In her remaining years of life, she showed signs of depression, a trait which she transmitted to some of her children, but Ferdinand was ambivalent on account of being half French through his mother Louise-Élisabeth of France. Owing to ties with France's ally Spain, Napoleon offered to refrain from conquering the duchy if they agreed to let troops pass. After receiving no reply, he offered Ferdinand the island of Sardinia (which he did not control) in exchange for Parma. When he refused, Napoleon had French troops occupy Parma under General Jean-Baptiste Cervoni and forced Ferdinand to agree to the terms dictated by the French. Though Ferdinand and Maria Amalia were allowed to keep their titles, they were placed under French guard, and the duchy was ruled by French representatives and used for taxes to finance the French army.

Under the Treaty of Lunéville in February 1801, the Duchy of Parma was annexed to a newly founded French puppet state, the Kingdom of Etruria, which was granted to Louis, Amalia's eldest son, who was married to Infanta Maria Luisa of Spain, daughter of Napoleon's ally, Charles IV of Spain. Both Ferdinand and Maria Amalia opposed the treaty, and an agreement was reached that the duchy would not be occupied until Ferdinand's death. The new French governor of Parma, Jean-Andoche Junot, placed them under house arrest, and Maria Amalia reportedly feared for her husband's life.

On 9 October 1802, Maria Amalia was appointed head of a regency council set up by the dying Ferdinand. Her official reign lasted only for thirteen days. On 22 October 1802, the French annexed the duchy and expelled her from Parma. Ferdinand was thought to have been poisoned; there were rumors claiming that Maria Amalia poisoned him to win back her former power, but also that he had been poisoned by the spies of Napoleon.

== Widowhood and death ==
Sarcophagus of Maria Amalia of Austria (1746–1804)

Maria Amalia participated in the funeral procession of her husband alongside their daughters. She was given permission by her nephew, Francis II, Holy Roman Emperor, to live in Prague Castle with her two youngest daughters, Maria Antonia and Maria Carlotta and a small retinue of servants. Here, she remained depressed from the execution of her sister Marie Antoinette, whom she mourned for the rest of her life, and she became sickly, suffering from cough and a series of colds. Her two oldest children, Carolina and Louis, died before her, which worsened her depressive state. In 1803, Louis died from an epileptic seizure, while Carolina gave birth to her eighth child, the future Queen of Spain Maria Josepha Amalia of Saxony, but she never recovered and died from puerperal fever three months later, in 1804. Maria Amalia died in Prague Castle on 18 June 1804 from breast cancer after a series of colds, and her sisters Maria Elisabeth and Maria Carolina went to say goodbye to her, but couldn't come in time before her death. Her body was interred at the royal crypt of the St. Vitus Cathedral in Prague (the last royal funeral there), and her heart was taken to Vienna and placed inside urn number thirty-three in her family's Herzgruft Herzgruft, 'Heart Crypt'.

== Issue ==
Maria Amalia and her husband Ferdinand had nine children:

Children of Maria Amalia of Austria by Ferdinand of Parma
Name	Picture	Birth	Death	Notes
Carolina Maria Teresa Giuseppa Giovanna		Ducal Palace of Colorno, 22 November 1770	Dresden Castle, 1 March 1804	She married in 1792 Maximilian, Hereditary Prince of Saxony; they had eight children.
Ludovico Filiberto Francesco		Ducal Palace of Colorno, 5 July 1773	Palazzo Pitti, Florence, 27 May 1803	Prince of Piacenza and the first King of Etruria. He married in 1795 Princess Marie Louise of Spain; they had two children.
Maria Antonia Giuseppa Walburga Anna Luisa Teresa Vicenza Margherita Caterina		Ducal Palace of Colorno, 28 November 1774	Convent of Sant'Agata in Trastevere, Rome, 20 February 1841	She was engaged to a Prince of the House of Savoy but he died and she became an Ursuline nun in 1803 with the name of Sister Luisa Maria.
Maria Carlotta Ferdinanda Teresa Anna Giuseppa Giovanna Luisa Vincenza Rosalia		Palazzo del Giardino, 1 September 1777	Convent of Santi Domenico e Sisto, Rome 6 April 1813	She became a Dominican nun in 1797 with the name of Sister Giacinta Domenica.
Filippo Maria Giuseppe Leopoldo Francesco		Ducal Palace of Piacenza, 22 March 1783	Ducal Palace of Colorno, 2 July 1786	Principe of Guastalla, died at the age of three years due to scurvy.
Maria Antonietta Luisa Teresa		Ducal Palace of Colorno, 21 October 1784	Ducal Palace of Colorno, 22 October 1785	Died at the age of one year due to smallpox.
Maria Luisa Teresa Isabella Antonietta		Ducal Palace of Piacenza, 17 April 1787	Palazzo del Giardino, 22 November 1789	Died at the age of two due to pleurisy.
Son		21 May 1789	21 May 1789	Stillborn.
Daughter		21 May 1789	21 May 1789	Twin of the above, stillborn.

== Ancestry ==
Ancestors of Maria Amalia, Duchess of Parma

8. Charles V, Duke of Lorraine
4. Leopold, Duke of Lorraine
9. Eleanor of Austria
2. Francis I, Holy Roman Emperor
10. Philippe I, Duke of Orléans
5. Élisabeth Charlotte d'Orléans
11. Elizabeth Charlotte of the Palatinate
1. Archduchess Maria Amalia of Austria
12. Leopold I, Holy Roman Emperor
6. Charles VI, Holy Roman Emperor
13. Eleonor Magdalene of Neuburg
3. Maria Theresa of Austria
14. Louis Rudolph, Duke of Brunswick-Wolfenbüttel
7. Elisabeth Christine of Brunswick
15. Christine Louise of Oettingen-Oettingen

== Notes ==
Maria Amalia, Duchess of Parma House of Habsburg-Lorraine Cadet branch of the House of Lorraine Born: 26 February 1746 Died: 18 June 1804
Royal titles
Preceded by Princess Louise Élisabeth of France	Duchess consort of Parma; 19 July 1769 – 9 October 1802	Succeeded by Princess Maria Teresa of Savoy
