= Louise-Élisabeth of France =

Duchess of Parma from 1748 to 1759

Louise Élisabeth
- Madame Royale
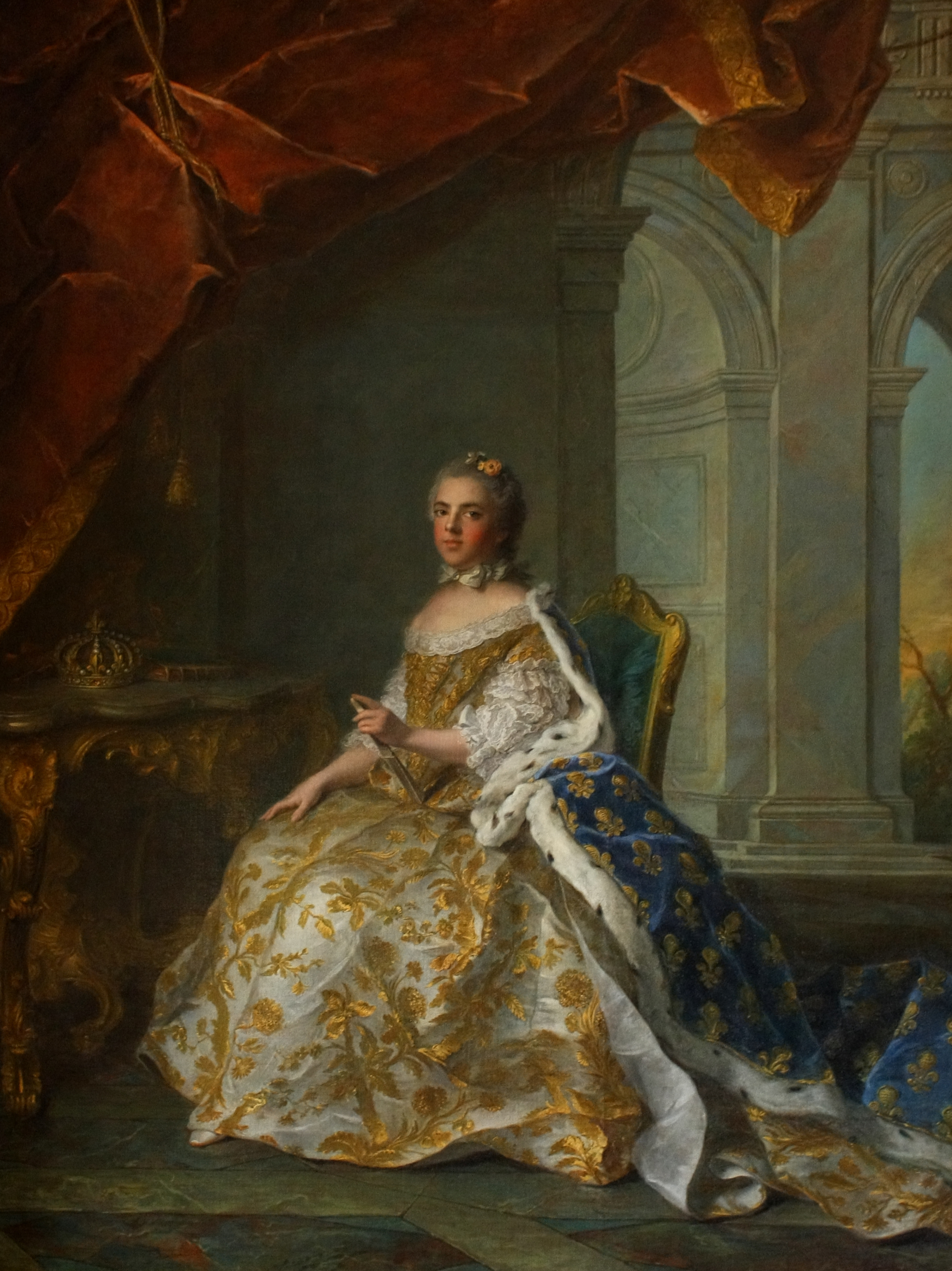
- Posthumous portrait of Louise Élisabeth by Nattier, c. 1760

Duchess consort of Parma, Piacenza and Guastalla
- Tenure: 18 October 1748 – 6 December 1759
- Born: 14 August 1727; Palace of Versailles, Versailles, Kingdom of France
- Died: 6 December 1759 (aged 32); Palace of Versailles, Versailles, Kingdom of France
- Burial: Basilica of Saint-Denis
- Spouse: Philip, Duke of Parma (m. 1739)
- Issue In detail: Isabella, Archduchess of Austria; Ferdinand I, Duke of Parma; Maria Luisa, Queen of Spain
Names
- French: Marie Louise-Élisabeth de France; Spanish: Maria Luisa Isabel de Francia
- House: Bourbon
- Father: Louis XV
- Mother: Maria Leszczyńska

Louise-Élisabeth of France (Marie Louise-Élisabeth; (Note: Though most sources refer to her simply as "Louise-Élisabeth", some sources give her full birth name as "Marie Louise-Élisabeth".) 14 August 1727 – 6 December 1759) was a French princess, a fille de France. She was the eldest daughter of King Louis XV and Queen Maria Leszczyńska, and the twin sister of Henriette of France, and she was the only one of his legitimate daughters who married. She married Infante Philip of Spain, who inherited the Duchy of Parma and Piacenza through his mother in 1748. Infante Philip was her father's first cousin; both men were grandsons of Louis, Grand Dauphin. Thereafter, Élisabeth and her husband founded the House of Bourbon-Parma. She functioned as the de facto ruler of the Duchy of Parma between 1748 and 1759.

== Life ==
=== Early life ===
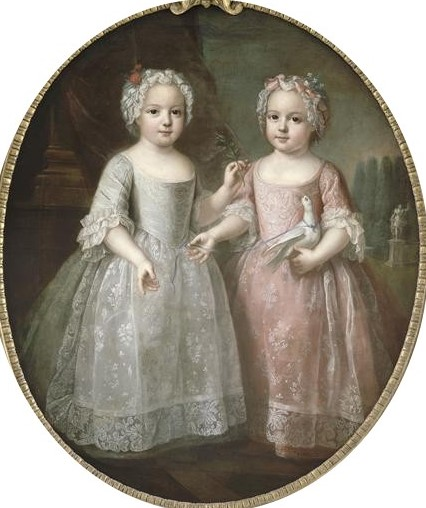
Élisabeth (left) and Henriette of France, 1737

Marie Louise Élisabeth and her younger twin sister Henriette were born at the Palace of Versailles on 14 August 1727 to King Louis XV and his wife, Queen Maria Leszczyńska. Along with her twin, she was baptised at Versailles on 27 April 1737. As a legitimate daughter of the King, she was a fille de France, but was known at court as Madame Royale, Madame Première, Madame Élisabeth, and also as Babette within her family circle.

She was put under the care of Marie Isabelle de Rohan, Duchess of Tallard. Élisabeth was raised at Versailles with Henriette, their younger sisters Marie Louise, Marie Adélaïde; and their brother, Louis, Dauphin of France. Her younger sisters, Victoire, Sophie, Marie Thérèse and Louise Marie, were sent to be raised in Fontevraud Abbey in June 1738.

Élisabeth was regarded as not being as pretty as her twin: her nose was considered too short and too broad; her face too plump; with her forehead, high; and complexion dark and sometimes blotchy. She was sometimes described as dull and indolent, but usually vivacious and decided: it was said of her that she "knew how to exact obedience and to get her own way", and she was generally considered charming, "pleasing, piquant, and intelligent personality".

In February 1739, when she was eleven years old, her engagement to the Infante Philip of Spain was announced. Philip was the third son of Louis XV's uncle, Philip V of Spain, and Elisabeth Farnese of Parma.

This engagement followed a tradition dating back to 1559 of cementing military and political alliances between the Catholic powers of France and Spain with royal marriages. Despite this, the announcement of the marriage agreement was not well received at the French court, as there was little chance that Philip would become king of Spain, and that only a marriage with a crown prince or a king was deemed worthy of a princess of France. Barrister Barbier wrote in his diary "It seems extraordinary that the eldest Daughter of France is not marrying a crowned head", and d'Argenson speculated that the marriage was arranged only because of a plan to make Don Philip king of Naples and Sicily. Élisabeth herself "considered her destiny to be less glorious than she had the right to expect", and when she was asked if she would not feel pleased to be called Infanta, her face reportedly "contracted into a scornful grimace".

The twelve-year-old Élisabeth was married by proxy in Versailles on 26 August 1739, and thereafter known as Madame Infanta in France. According to the memoirs of the Duke of Luynes, Elisabeth spent a great deal of time with her loving mother, Queen Marie Leszczyńska in her apartments prior to her departure. When she left for Spain in September, Her mother wept alongside her younger siblings while the King was reportedly so moved that he entered her carriage and accompanied her for the first miles on her journey. She passed the border and met her nineteen-year-old husband some thirty kilometers northeast of Madrid, at Alcalá de Henares, where the marriage took place on 25 October 1739.

=== Infanta of Spain ===
Élisabeth made a personal success upon her arrival in Spain and was soon the "idol of Madrid". She made favorable impressions on her father-in-law, King Philip V, and her spouse, Prince Philip, although her relationship with her mother-in-law, Elisabeth of Parma soon became one of mutual dislike. The Queen was displeased that Élisabeth's dowry was not paid by France, nor did France assist Spain in the war with Britain; further more, after about six months the Queen reportedly realized that she would not be able to control or dominate Élisabeth, as she was accustomed to do with her husband and son, and that her daughter-in-law could potentially replace her own influence over her son. As a result, Élisabeth spent most of her time away from the Queen, playing with dolls and wrote of her unhappiness to her father.

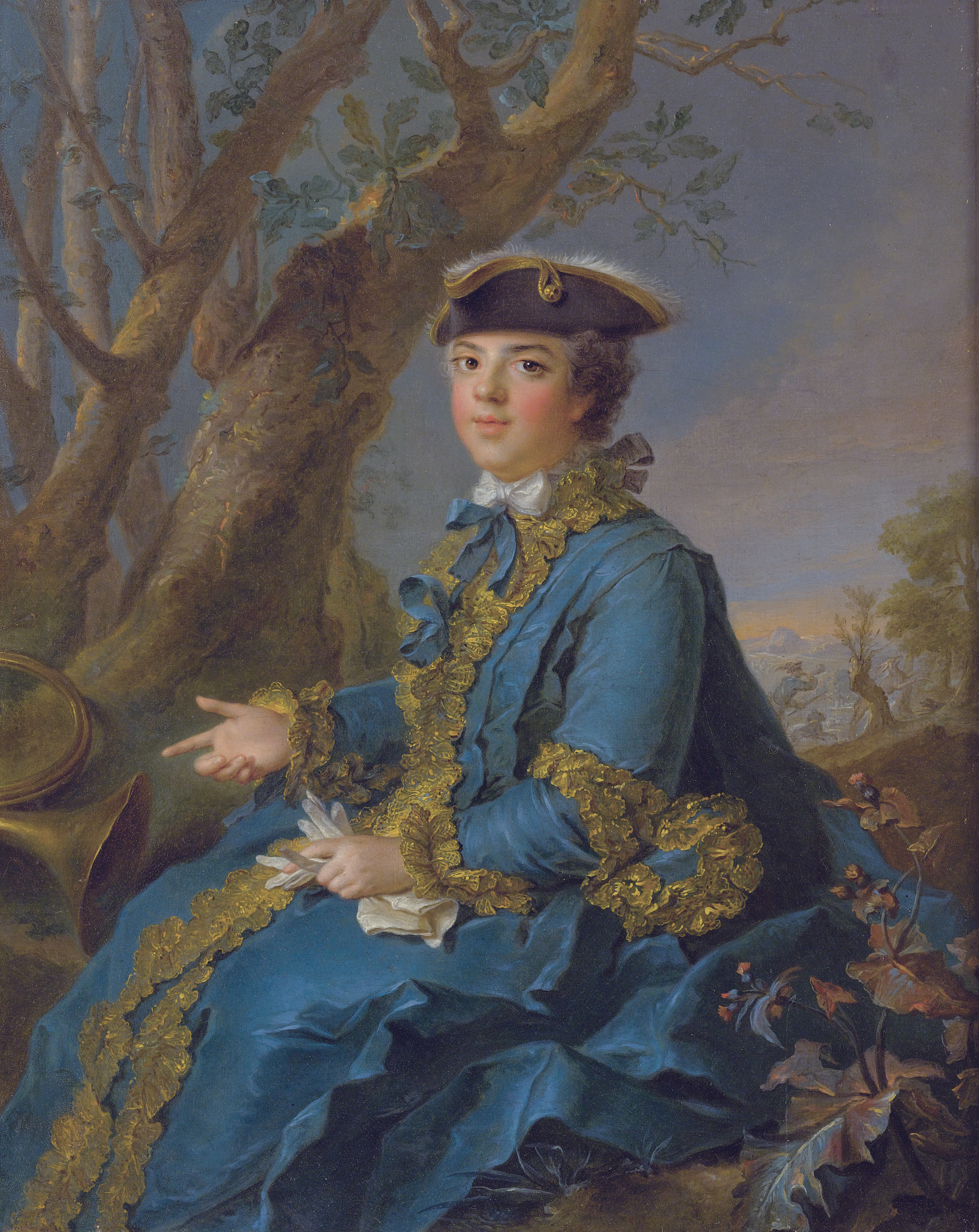
Élisabeth in hunting dress, by Jean-Marc Nattier

Élisabeth soon came to dominate Philip; though he was eight years her senior, he, as his father, was reportedly of a timid, passive and submissive nature, and Élisabeth reportedly felt affection for him but generally treated him as "a boy much younger than herself although he was older than her by eight years". De Luynes later observed: "Although the Prince at twenty-eight is as much of a child as he was at fourteen or fifteen, he has, nevertheless, an affectionate regard for the Infanta."

Élisabeth was described as "keen, ambitious and enterprising, untiring in her energies and passionately fond of her changing Europe to the advantage of her House, of imbuing everyone with a love for France and of making her son a prince worthy of his great French forefathers". She was not satisfied with her position as the spouse of a prince with no prospects of being king; she kept in contact with the French court, in particular with her twin, informed her brother the Dauphin of all events at the Spanish court, and had already by 1740 established a net of contacts at the French court to assist her in her ambition to obtain an independent position for herself and her spouse, "worthy of the birth of both". Her twin Henriette, otherwise regarded as habitually apathetic of politics, was reportedly passionately devoted to work for the political ambition of her elder twin Élisabeth, as did her younger sister Adélaïde and her sister-in-law Infanta Maria Teresa Rafaela of Spain;the powerful Adrien Maurice de Noailles, 3rd Duke of Noailles and Jean-Frédéric Phélypeaux, Count of Maurepas, allied with the Queen to achieve the same, and the French ambassador at Madrid, Monseigneur Louis-Gui de Guérapin de Vauréal, bishop of Rennes, was reportedly so willing to be of assistance that he was ridiculed for it.

In 1741, Philip was called to serve in the War of the Austrian Succession, through which it was hoped that he would be able to secure one of the duchies of Northern Italy. Her mother-in-law Queen Elisabeth reportedly made sure that Philip stayed in camp for almost all of the war, separated from his wife, in order to prevent her from replacing his mother in his affection; through their correspondence, the Queen repeatedly asked her son if he loved his wife: "I want to know if you love . : [the sign which Elisabeth Farnese used to denote her daughter-in-law when writing to her son] Tell me the truth!" Despite the mutual antipathy between Élisabeth and her mother-in-law they were in fact united in their ambitions for Prince Philip. During the war, Queen Elisabeth worked to secure her son Philip a throne in Italy, while her daughter-in-law used her net of contacts to do the same. Their goal was achieved with the Treaty of Aix-la-Chapelle (1748).

=== Duchess of Parma ===
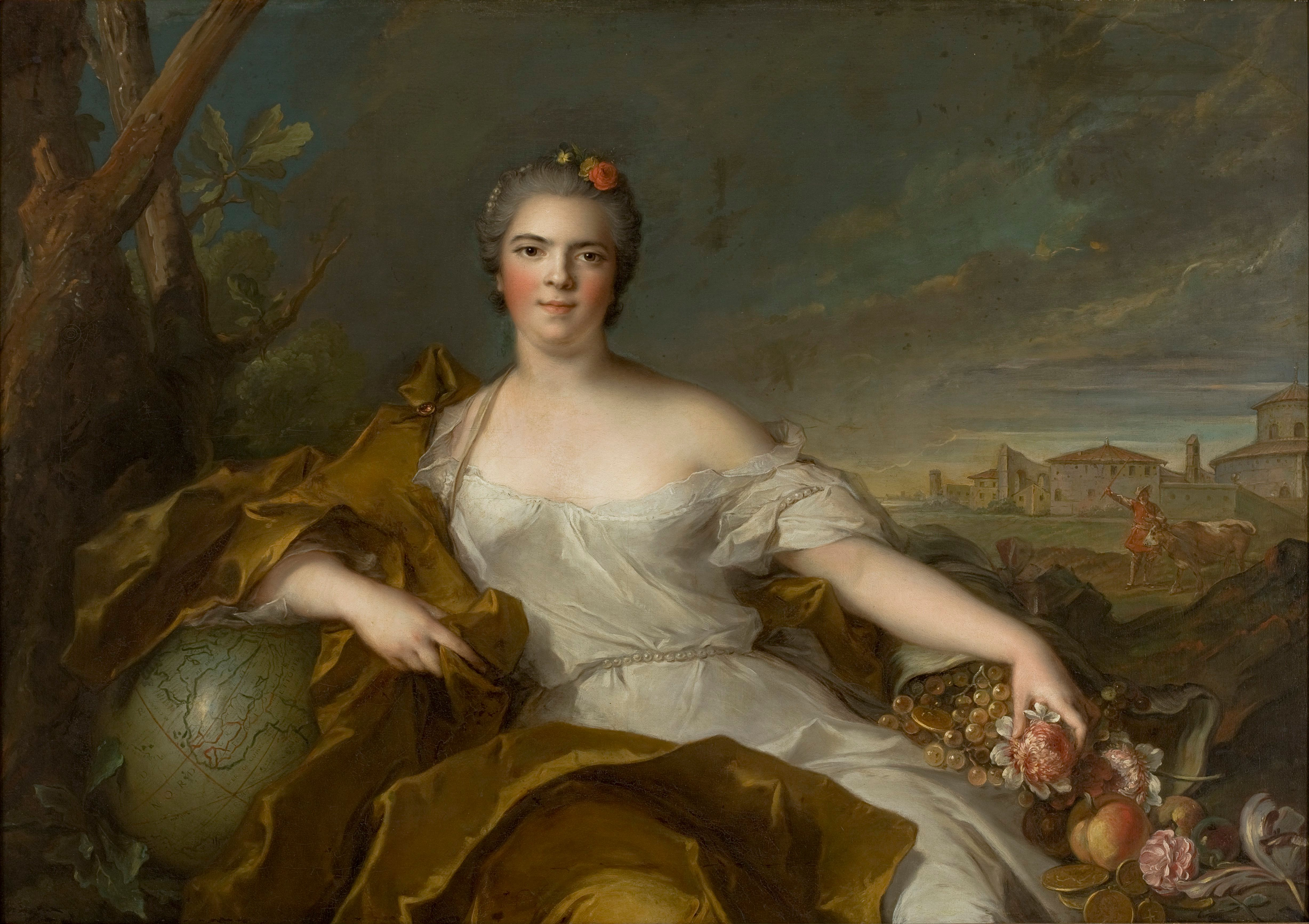
Madame Louise-Elisabeth, Duchess of Parma - The Earth by Jean-Marc Nattier, 1750

In the Treaty of Aix-la-Chapelle (1748) which ended the War of the Austrian Succession, Empress Maria Theresa ceded the duchies of Parma, Piacenza and Guastalla to Ferdinand VI of Spain. At Louis XV's instigation, Philip was created duke of Parma.

Élisabeth was pleased with her new position, however, she felt it necessary to obtain an income independent of Spain, so she left for the French court with the ambition to secure an income from her father.

Élisabeth was met at the Château de Choisy by her twin and her brother the Dauphin. She arrived in Versailles on the 11 December 1748 with a retinue composed of her camarera mayor the Marquise de Lcyde, her secretary of state the Duke of Montellano as major domo-in-chief, and three maids-of-honour. The French court was amazed over her lack of pomp; it was said that she did not appear to own more clothes than those she had brought with her from France nine years earlier. She was described as clever, quick and practical, with a robust strength of mind, and efficiently focused on state affairs. A courtier described Élisabeth as "charming" with "piercing eyes" that "express(ed) intelligence" while another, less sympathetic observer claimed she looked like a "well-endowed young woman, matured by motherhood". During her stay at Versailles, she spent most of her time with her father the King, who visited her several times daily via a private staircase to discuss business with her while she also regularly visited her mother Queen Marie Leszczyńska in her own apartments to whom she maintained an affectionate relationship and correspondence when she was in Spain and later in Parma. She successfully achieved her goal when her father granted two hundred thousand francs for the Duke of Parma. Her strong will and influence on her father reportedly worried his maîtresse-en-titre, Madame de Pompadour. When she left Versailles on 18 October 1749, she brought a French retinue of followers, a trousseau and so many gowns that D’Argenson commented that her journey had cost the State twelve hundred thousand livres.

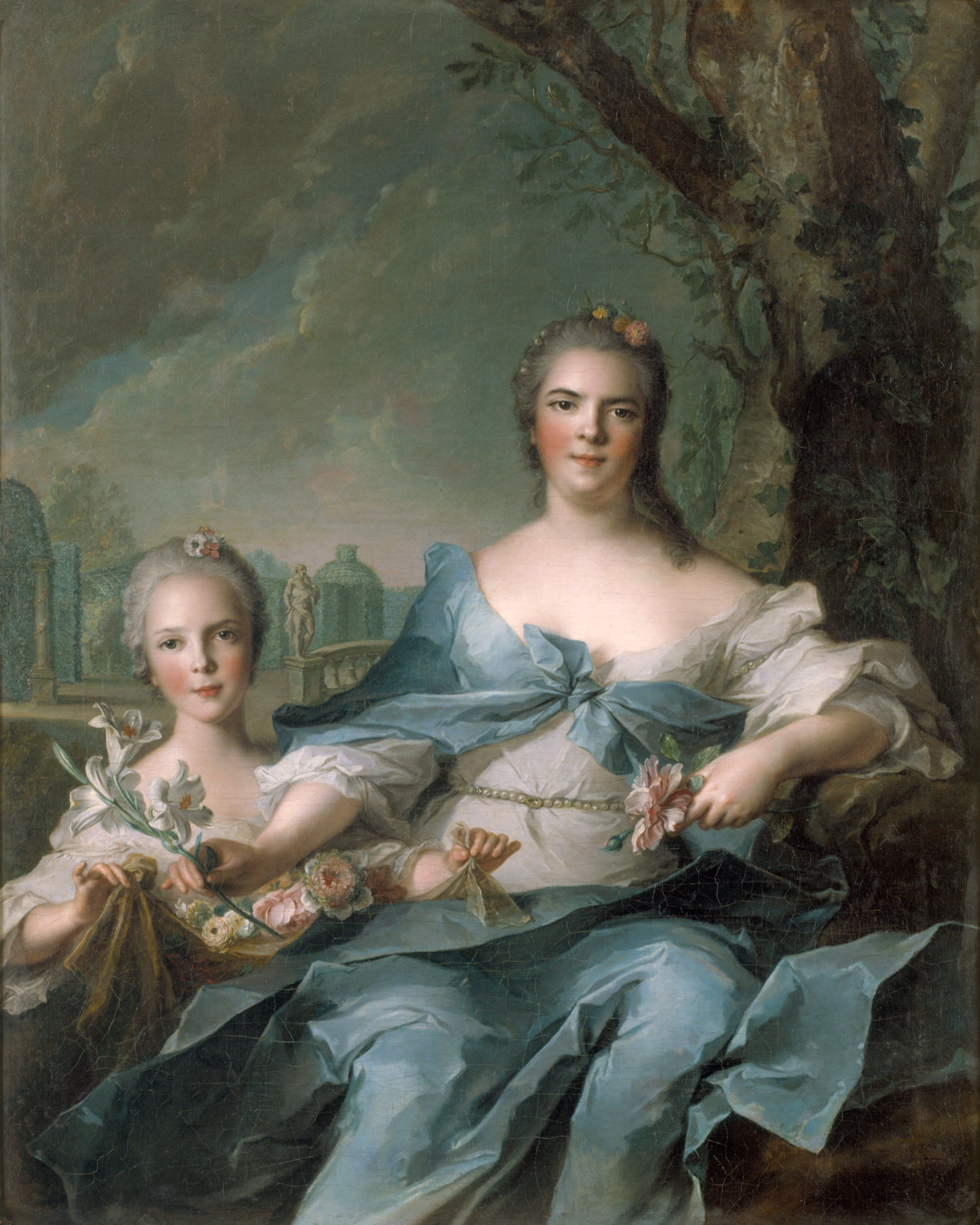
Élisabeth with her eldest daughter Isabella at the Palace of Fontainebleau, by Jean-Marc Nattier

In December 1749, Élisabeth and her retinue of Spanish and French courtiers arrived in the Duchy of Parma, where they were welcomed by Philip and greeted by public celebrations in her honour. In Parma, she and Philip lived in the Ducal Palace of Colorno. Before the former duke, Philip's brother Charles, had left to become king of Naples, he had reportedly stripped the palace of much of its interior decoration and furniture, and the residence also lacked a garden. Élisabeth spent great sums to create a residence and a court to her taste; the whole arrangement and plan of the residence was redesigned, and she organised court ceremonies and hosted numerous festivities such as opera six times a week and trips to the second residence in Colorno and Piacenza. To enforce the status of the duchy, she also introduced the presence of a regiment of one hundred carabiniers and a regiment of curassiers, despite the fact that the duchy was formally under the protection of France and Spain.

As duchess of Parma, Élisabeth was actively involved in state affairs; Philip never negotiated any business without consulting her, and she in turn never made a decision without considering the view of France and her French advisers. Most of the officials of the court and government were French, and French was the language spoken at court, even by Philip, while she herself demonstratively promoted French influence. French influence in Parma was not popular; public opinion raged against both French and Spanish rulers. In 1750, Élisabeth's lady-in-waiting Madame de Leydc was rumored to have poisoned France's Chief Minister at Parma, supposedly for being French. The financial stress of the duchy was extensive, which created a problem.

Élisabeth's twin sister Henriette died in 1752, and Élisabeth returned to France in September, visiting her tomb at Saint-Denis and remaining in Versailles for almost a year. She brought with her the duke of Noailles, who assisted her in the political transactions she held with her father during her stay, helping her to navigate between the party factions at court. Élisabeth presented Louis XV and his ministers with a report of the state of Parma, stressing its financial need. The duke of Noailles was sent to the French ambassador in Madrid to open negotiations between France and Spain regarding the contributions of the Duchy of Parma in January 1753, in which Élisabeth participated with all her contacts in France and Spain, supporting the French suggestion that France and Spain would share the expenses of the Duchy of Parma if the latter could guarantee her independence. By the Franco-Spanish agreement of 1753, the Duchy of Parma was granted twenty five thousand francs, two millions in taxes and supplementary assistance when needed, in addition to making French influence in Parma formal and officially legal. Élisabeth was hailed and praised in France for securing the French influence abroad by this agreement, in which she had played a vital part.

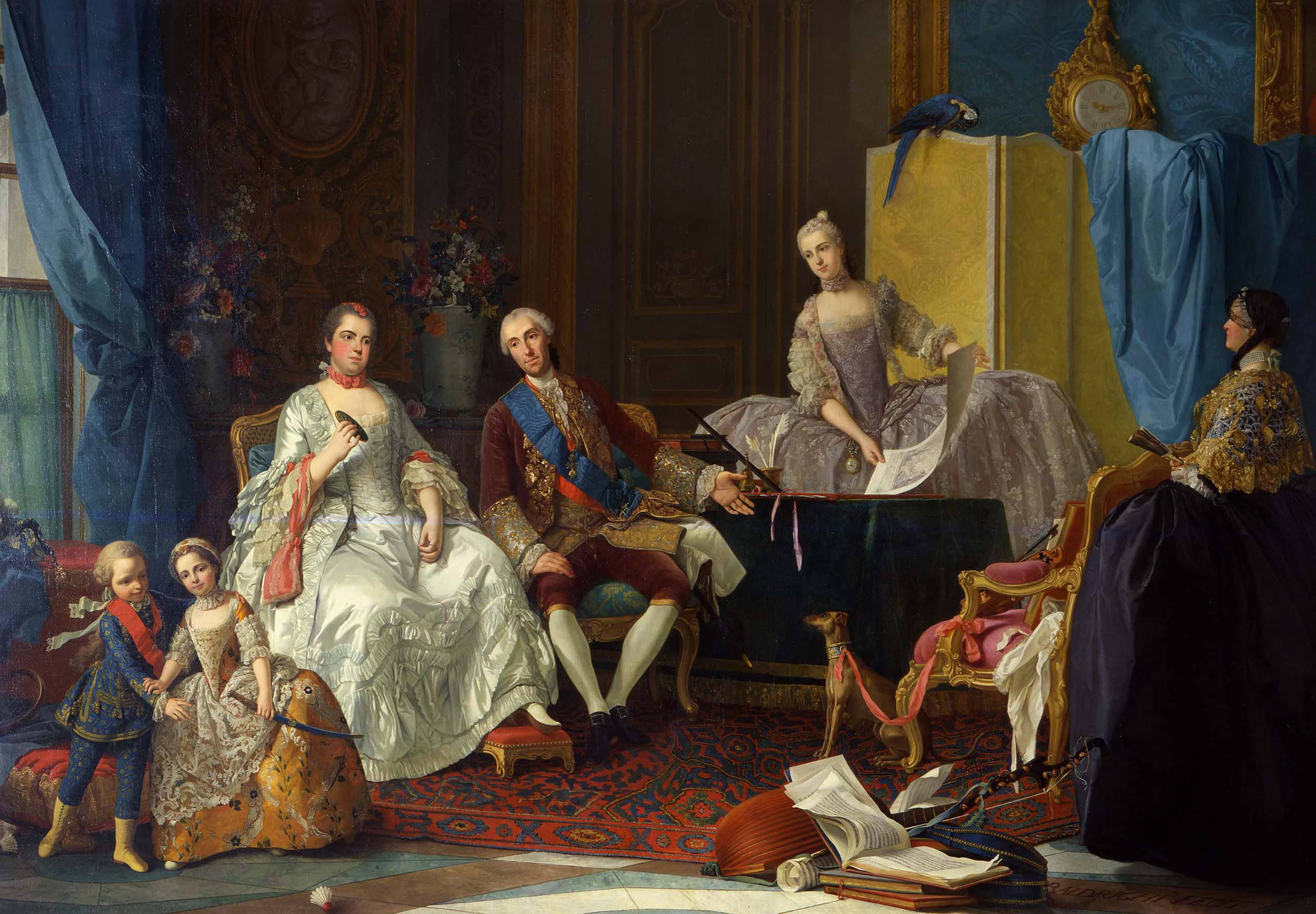
Élisabeth with her husband Philip, Duke of Parma, and their children Ferdinand and Maria Luisa; Isabella is shown in a purple dress; by Giuseppe Baldrighi.

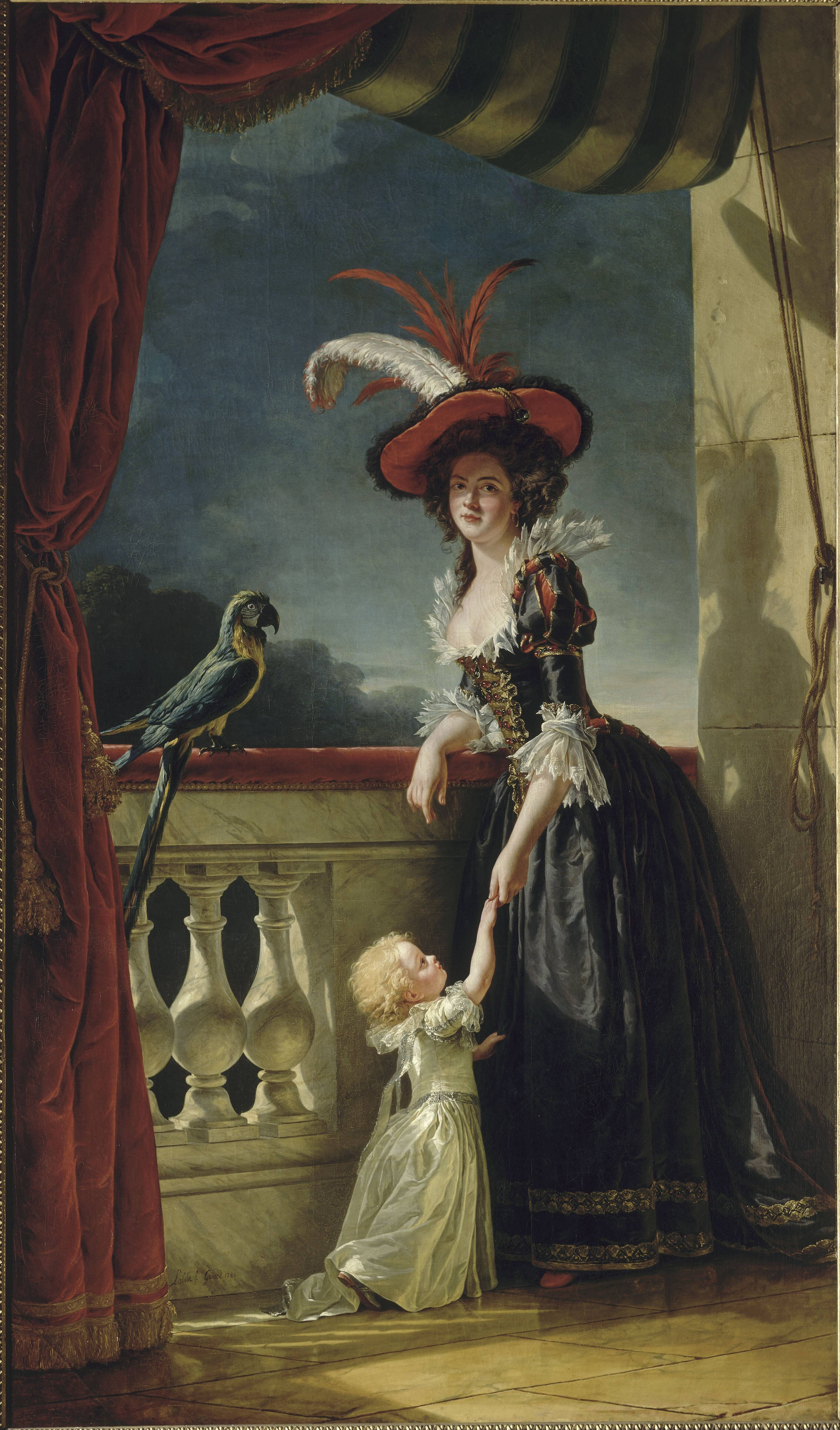
Posthumous portrait of Louise Élisabeth with her son, by Adélaïde Labille-Guiard. The portrait was commissioned by her sisters in 1787; the shadows on her face and on the wall may symbolize death.

Élisabeth returned to Parma in October 1753. Upon her return, she appointed Guillaume du Tillot as chief minister and administrator of the principality, securing both her own pro-French policy as well as marking France's de facto conquest of Parma. In her policy, Élisabeth worked to free Parma from Spanish influence; to secure the succession of the duchy for her son and if possibly obtain a greater throne for him with French help; and to secure dynastic marriages for her daughters. In accordance with her ambitions, she viewed Spain as her enemy and therefore supported the Treaty of Versailles (1756), which allied France with Austria. In the treaty, it had been suggested that Austria would cede the Austrian Netherlands as a kingdom for Philip, which would be even more favourable for France than to have Parma as a vassal, a plan which was supported by both Élisabeth and Louis XV. In this plan, she worked together with Madame de Pompadour to secure the Franco-Austrian alliance, and they also joined in their support of Étienne François de Choiseul, Duke of Choiseul.

Élisabeth returned to France again in September 1757 to attend the negotiations between France and Austria. She supported Austria's wish to make the Austrian Netherlands a kingdom for Philip in exchange for retrieving Silesia from Prussia with the support of France, as it would mean a final independence of Spain, but was not successful. In the treaty between Spain and Austria on 3 October 1759, supported by Choiseul, the right of Philip in the Treaty of 1748 to succeed to the throne of Naples and Sicily should his brother Charles inherit the throne of Spain, was a great disappointment to her. During her stay in France, she kept in contact with Philip by letter and informed him of her acts, negotiations, hopes and successes, as well as the intentions and actions of Louis’ government. During this time, Élisabeth also appointed the philosopher Étienne Bonnot de Condillac as her son's tutor despite opposition from the Jesuits, and arranged the marriage of her daughter Isabella to the Archduke Joseph of Austria, which took place in 1760.

Élisabeth fell ill while she was at Versailles and was nursed by her own mother Queen Marie Leszczyńska. She died of smallpox on 6 December 1759 and was buried on 27 March 1760 at the Basilica of Saint-Denis beside her twin, Henriette. Their tombs were desecrated in 1793 during the French Revolution.

== Children ==
- Isabella Maria Luisa Antonietta Ferdinanda Giuseppina Saveria Dominica Giovanna (1741–1763); who later married the future Austrian Emperor, Joseph II, older brother of Marie Antoinette, Maria Carolina and Maria Amalia. Had issue.
- Ferdinand Maria Filippo Lodovico Sebastiano Francesco Giacomo (1751–1802); who succeeded his father as Duke of Parma in 1765 and married Archduchess Maria Amalia of Austria, his older sister's sister-in-law. Had issue.
- Luisa Maria Teresa Ana (1751–1819); known as Maria Luisa, who married Infante Charles of Spain, her cousin, and later became the Queen consort of Spain. Had issue.

== Ancestry ==
Ancestors of Louise-Élisabeth of France

8. Louis, Dauphin of France
4. Louis, Duke of Burgundy
9. Maria Anna Victoria of Bavaria
2. Louis XV of France
10. Victor Amadeus II of Sardinia
5. Marie Adélaïde of Savoy
11. Anne Marie of Orléans
1. Louise Élisabeth of France
12. Rafał Leszczyński
6. Stanisław I Leszczyński
13. Anna Jabłonowska
3. Marie Leszczyńska
14. Jan Karol Opaliński
7. Katarzyna Opalińska
15. Zofia Czarnkowska

Louise-Élisabeth of France House of Bourbon Cadet branch of the Capetian dynasty Born: 14 August 1727 Died: 6 December 1759
French royalty
Preceded by Marie Thérèse	Madame Royale; 1727–1739	Succeeded by Marie Thérèse
