= Voivozi =

Voivozi may refer to several villages in Romania:

- Voivozi, a village in Popeşti Commune, Bihor County
- Voivozi, a village in Şimian Commune, Bihor County
