= Ferenc Kazinczy =

Hungarian author (1759–1831)

Noble Ferenc Kazinczy de Kazinc et Alsóregmec
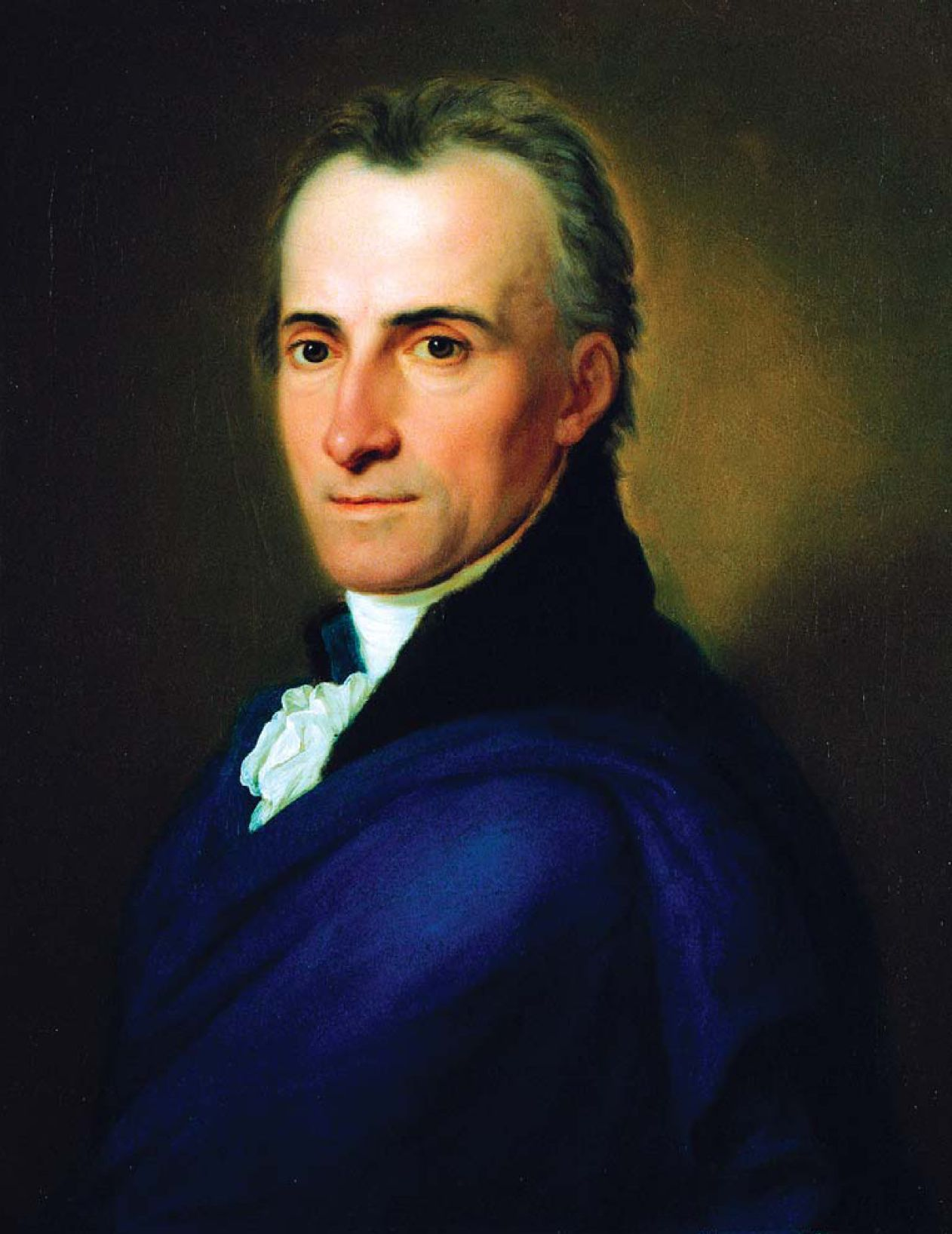
- Portrait by János Donát, 1812
- Born: 27 October 1759; Érsemjén, Bihar, Hungary (today Șimian, Romania)
- Died: 23 August 1831 (aged 71); Széphalom, Zemplén County, Hungary (today part of Sátoraljaújhely)
- Resting place: Széphalom, Sátoraljaújhely, Borsod-Abaúj-Zemplén County Hungary
- Education: law
- Alma mater: College of Debrecen (1766); College of Késmárk (1768); College of Sárospatak (1769–1779)
- Occupations: author neologist poet translator notary inspector of education
- Spouse: Sophie Török (m. 1804)
- Children: Iphigenia; Eugenia; Thalia; Márk Emil Ferenc; Antal Sophron Ferenc; Anna Iphigenia; Bálint Cecil Ferenc; Lajos
- Writing career
- Language: Hungarian
- Notable works: Tövisek és virágok (1811); Poétai episztola Vitkovics Mihályhoz (1811); Ortológus és neológus nálunk és más nemzeteknél (1819)
- Movements: Age of Enlightenment; Classicism

Ferenc Kazinczy (Note: Hungarian pronunciation: [ˈfɛrɛnt͡s ˈkɒzintsi]) (in older English: Francis Kazinczy; October 27, 1759 – August 23, 1831) was a Hungarian author, poet, translator, neologist, an agent in the regeneration of the Hungarian language and literature at the turn of the 19th century. Today his name is connected with the extensive Language Reform of the 19th century, when thousands of words were coined or revived, enabling the Hungarian language to keep up with scientific progress and become an official language of the nation in 1844. For his linguistic and literary works he is regarded as one of the cultural founders of the Hungarian Reform Era along with Dávid Baróti Szabó, Ferenc Verseghy, György Bessenyei, Mátyás Rát and János Kis.

== Life ==
=== Early years ===
Ferenc Kazinczy was born in Érsemjén, Bihar, Hungary (today Șimian, Romania). His father, József Kazinczy de Kazincz (1732–1784) came from an old noble family and worked as a magistrate at Abaúj County. His mother was Zsuzsanna Bossányi de Nagybossány (1740–1812). Ferenc had four brothers and four sisters. Until the age of eight he was brought up by his maternal grandfather, Ferenc Bossányi, the notary of Bihar County and parliamentary ambassador, where he did not hear any foreign word during his first seven years.

He wrote his first letters in December 1764 to his parents who lived in Alsóregmec at that time. In 1766 his aunt got sick, therefore they moved to Debrecen for three months for the healing treatment. Kazinczy studied during that time at the College of Debrecen. After the death of his aunt he returned to his parents where he learnt Latin and German from a student of the College of Késmárk (today Kežmarok, Slovakia). His well educated and enlightened father, experiencing rare susceptibility, was delighted with his son, so he also taught him and communicated with him in Latin and German. Kazinczy continued his language studies in Késmárk in 1768 in a preparatory class.

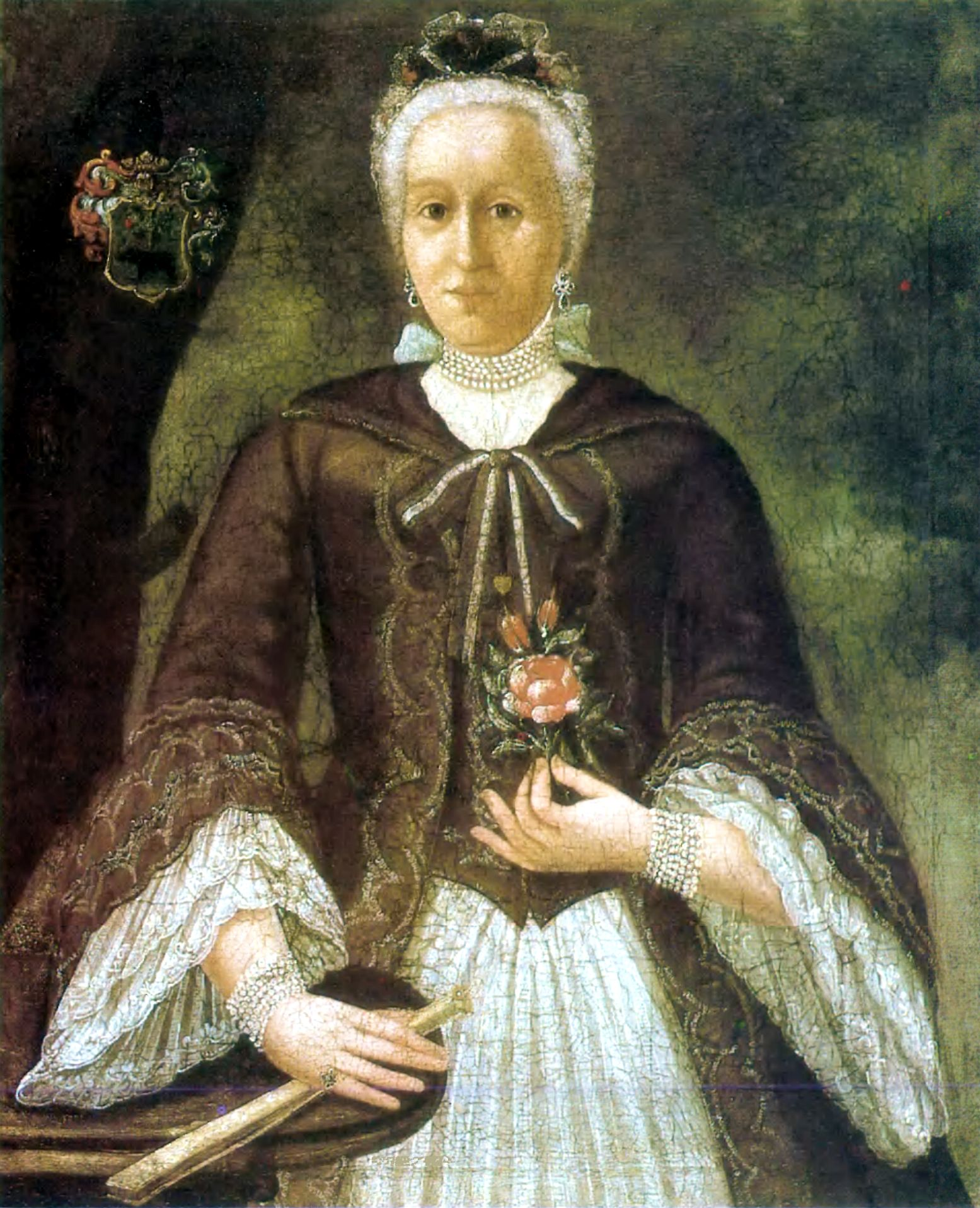
Portrait of Zsuzsanna Bossányi de Nagybossány (1740–1812), the mother of Ferenc Kazinczy

His father, József Kazinczy, initially wanted Ferenc to become a soldier, but Ferenc's resistance and the development of his other especially literary talents diverged him from his intent, and then he wanted to see his son as a writer. However the father, as a pietistic educator, understood under the profession of a writer a religious one, and therefore ordered his fourteen-year-old son to translate Christian Fürchtegott Gellert's dissertations on religion from Latin to Hungarian. Otherwise, the father provided his son advanced education: Ferenc was educated in foreign languages, could practice fine art and music, and for seeing the world, he brought him to county assemblies and for the lunch of the emperor, Joseph II when the ruler visited Sárospatak. In 1774 the father urged his son to continue his translations, but Ferenc preferred to spend time reading György Bessenyei's Ágis tragédiája (1772), Ignác Mészáros's Kártigám (1772) and other belles-lettres works. He broadened his knowledge with the idylls of Salomon Gessner and the poems of Virgil, Horace, Anacreon.

He did not neglect his theological studies, and even at home they frequently debated over theological topics during lunch and dinner. After his father's death in 1774, he continued to pursue the translation of Christian Fürchtegott Gellert's De religione until his teacher of theology dismissed him to do it because he found Gellert's works too difficult to interpret. Ferenc turned slowly from theological to more secular and national topics and prepared a short geographical description of the country. István Losonczi Hányoki's Three Small Mirrors served as an example for his work. It was a childish compilation with the title Geography of Hungary..., which he later described as "suddenly scribbled" and was published in Kassa, Hungary (today Košice, Slovakia) at his mother's expense in 1775.

=== Sárospatak (1769–1779) ===
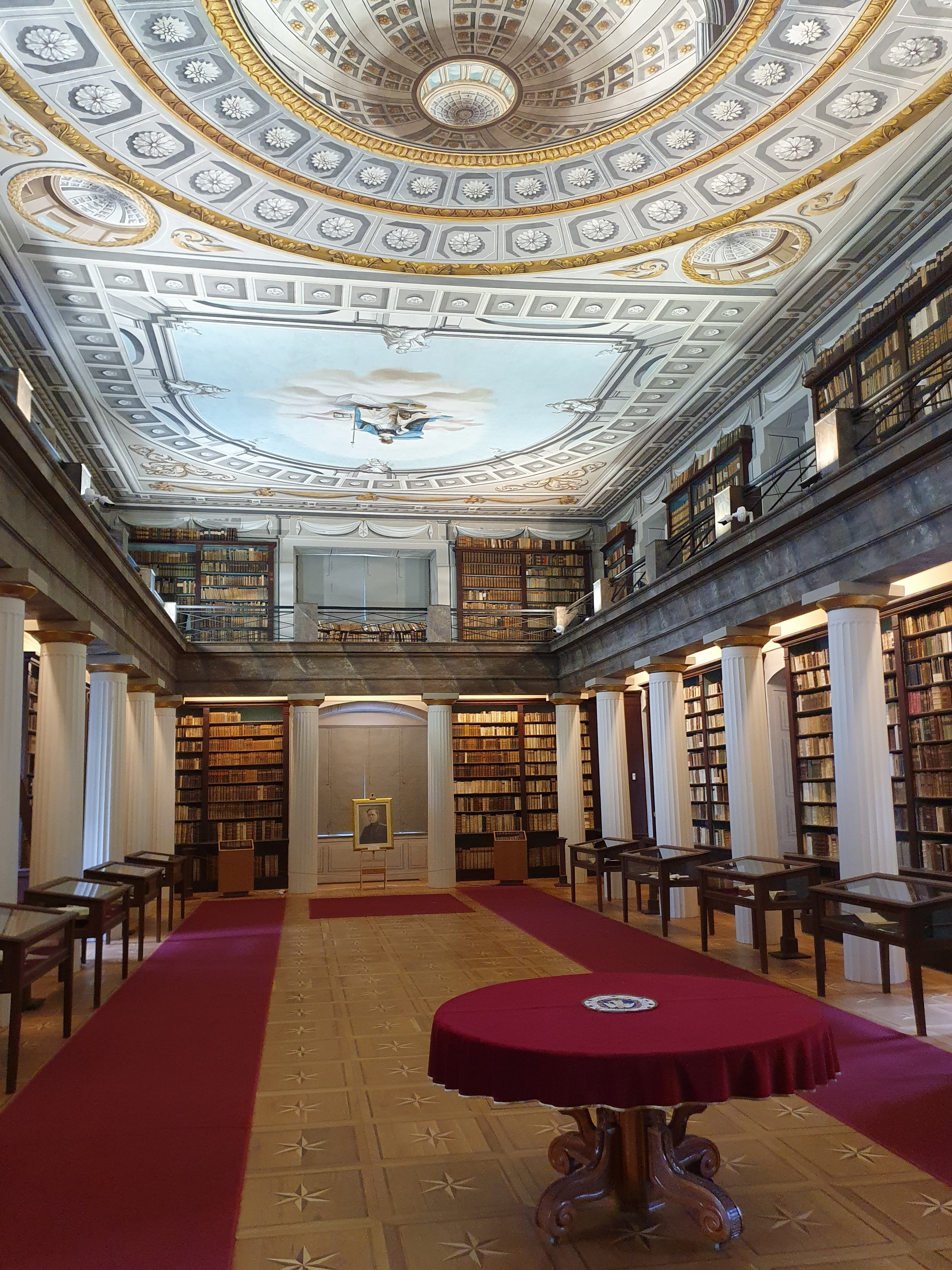
The library of the College of Sárospatak where Kazinczy spent his time reading and learning

On September 11, 1769, he became a student at the College of Sárospatak where he taught himself Ancient Greek. He studied philosophy and law during his first years. In 1773 he started to learn rhetoric. Even in the same year December he greeted General Count Miklós Beleznay as a member of the thanksgiving delegation of the college in Bugyi on a special reception for donating money toward the construction of the college. Then Kazinczy saw Pest for the first time. Until 1775 he attended the theology courses at the college and from a French soldier who came to Sárospatak learnt French.

He translated György Bessenyei's short story written in German, Die Amerikaner, to Hungarian and published it in 1776 in Kassa with the title Az amerikai Podoc és Kazimir keresztyén vallásra való megtérése (English: The conversion of American Podoc and Kazimir to the Christian religion). He recommended his translation to his mother. This work informed him about Deism and the principle of religious tolerance. In his translation Kazinczy used the word világosság (meaning clarity, lucidity) the first time in the history of the Hungarian language. Bessenyei welcomed it and his response was inspirational for Kazinczy. Kazinczy understood Bessenyei's response as a liberating letter for the profession of an author. He was happy finding the contact with one of the most prominent authors in Hungarian literature of that time. But Kazinczy did not become a follower of Bessenyei, because Bessenyei as a culture politician and philosopher did not mature his works so much so that he could create a literary school.

Ferenc's uncle was a member of the delegation of Zemplén County in Vienna at the royal court and he took the young Kazinczy along. This trip made a huge impact on him. It was the first time that Kazinczy saw the emperor's city, whose magnificent collections, especially his pictures, completely enthralled him.

At that time Kazinczy followed the thoughts of Salomon Gessner, Christoph Martin Wieland and Dávid Baróti Szabó. Later he got Sándor Báróczi's translation of Jean-François Marmontel's Contes Moraux (English: Moral tales) from the librarian of Sárospatak, which became his favourite book and he later took it along with him to the prison. So he decided to find a way to lay a wreath on Báróczi's works. What fascinated him was the beautiful new style, the rhythmically arranged packing of sentences, the rigidity and purity of the language with a dramatic compactness, and the French strangeness which made the translation truly incomprehensible for amateur readers. It showed Kazinczy a sample for the cultivation of Hungarian belles-lettres. Thus after being primarily inspired by Bessenyi he discovered a life goal as a translator and cultivator of the Hungarian language.

=== Kassa (1779–1780) ===
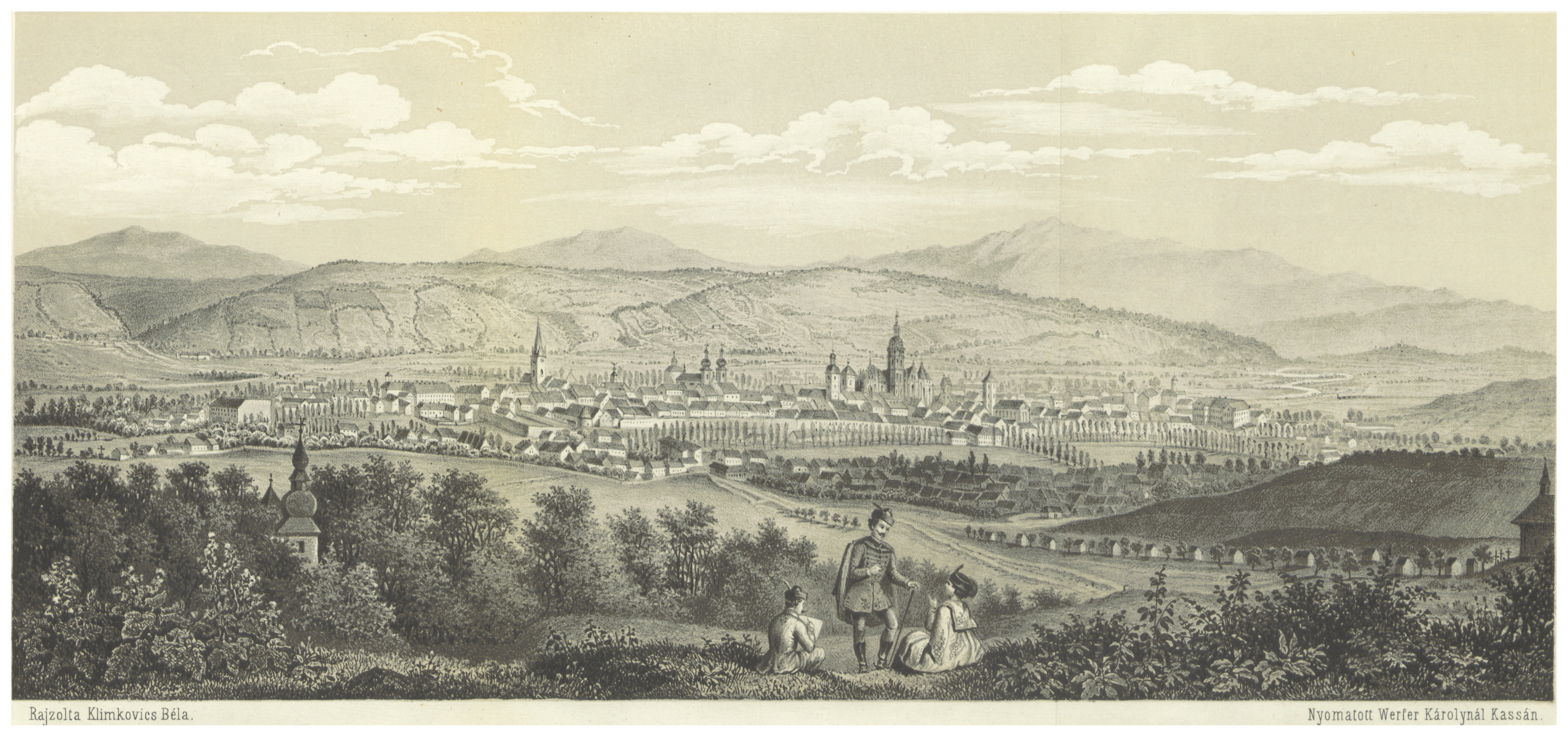
Ferenc Kazinczy lived in Kassa during his practice of law (1779–1780) and then later as an inspector of education (1785–1790).

After finishing his studies he travelled to Kassa on September 9, 1779, to meet Sámuel Milecz, the prosecutor of Tolna County, where he did his law degree and first met his young love, Erzsébet Rozgonyi and one of his role models, Dávid Baróti Szabó. He stayed there until October 18.

His world-view crises occurred during his stay in Kassa. He turned his back on the religious thesis and "useless" theological studies. Between 1779 and 1781 Kazinczy joined the laic, deist perception of religion which was free of dogmas. The artistic cult of beauty replaced the lost religious experience. His enthusiasm for beauty became his passion, consuming his whole personality and worldview. Sometime in 1780 he started his first major literary work, the translation of Salomon Gessner's writings among others. Soon after that he published the Hungarian version of Siegwart in 1783. Because of his translations he came in contact with several foreign authors and corresponded with Gessner, Johann Kaspar Lavater and Daniel Chodowiecki. His connection with renowned European scholars made him feel chosen. So after Rousseau he stated his own conscious separation from ordinary people.

Meanwhile, in 1779, he met Miklós Révai in Nagyvárad, Hungary (today Oradea, Romania). Révai was a grammarian who acclimatized the analysing of words according to the rules of morphology in the Hungarian language. They became friends and often shared their own ideas about literature and grammar with each other.

=== Eperjes (1781–1782) ===
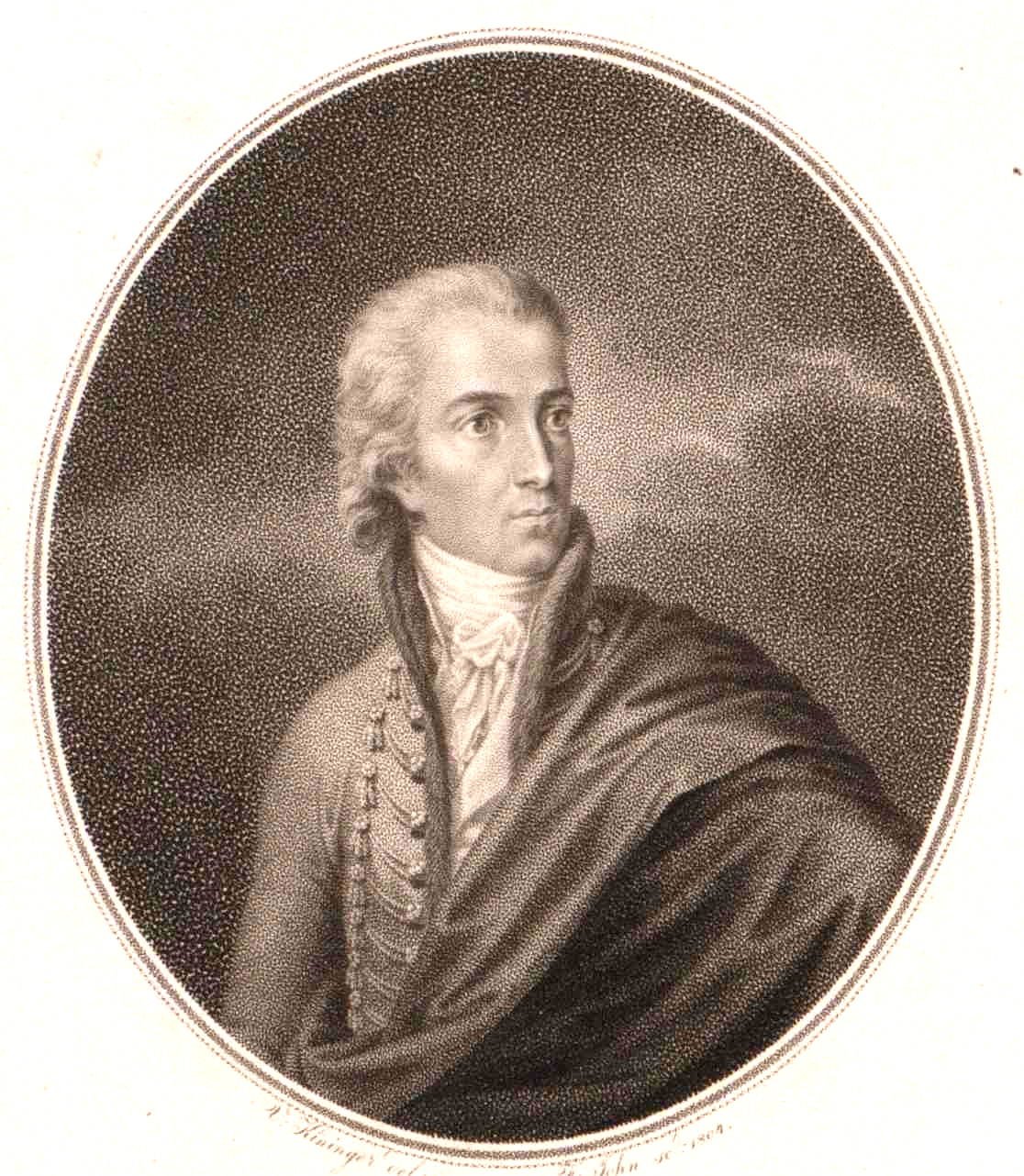
Portrait of Ferencz Kazinczy from 1780

Between January 11, 1781 and June 2, 1782, he continued his practice of law in Eperjes, Hungary (today Prešov, Slovakia). Besides his job he spent a lot of time with arts, too: dancing, playing the flute, drawing, painting and reading. His favourites were especially the German writers. During this time in Eperjes he fell in love with an "educated girl", the daughter of Ninos Steinmetz, who had a great influence on him.

=== Pest (1782–1783) ===
He continued his practice of law in August 1782 in Pest where he was sworn in as a hired clerk of József Bernáth. During his time in Pest he came in contact with two older, prominent authors, Lőrinc Orczy and Gedeon Ráday. Ráday introduced him even more to knowledge of Western literature, but also to an appreciation of the old Hungarian writers, especially Miklós Zrínyi. This friendship greatly developed Kazinczy's aesthetic sense and broadened his horizons. Kazinczy was still working on the translations of Salomon Gessner's idylls and showed them to Ráday and Báróczi. Their enthusiastic acknowledgement greatly enhanced his writer ambition. The fact that Kazinczy was working a lot on the translations of Gessner's maudlin, sentimental idylls, was partly brought by the sentimental trend at the time, but on the other hand, Kazinczy intended to practice the Hungarian prose in the depiction of emotions and expression of fond moods.

He found himself soon in a more lively intellectual and political life in Pest and became interested in the church policies of Joseph II which were born in the spirit of absolutism.

Miklós Beleznay, József Teleki, Gedeon Ráday and László Prónay were working on the preparation of the Patent of Toleration in 1781 just when Kazinczy became their trustworthy man. As a Protestant Kazinczy was glad to be so close to the "champions of Protestant freedom". The policies of the emperor on religious tolerance, on the press, and on the permission for Protestants to hold office strengthened his beliefs in his Freemasonry convictions of believing in the illusion of the "brightness" coming from above. Already in Miskolc, he became a member of the secret society in early 1784 which generally supported the civilization process. It had a major role in the refinement of morals and tastes, unlike the former religiosity, it captured rather the recently alienated members of the biblical religions with a mystical, mostly naturalistic mysticism. Kazinczy later, in the beginning of the 1790s, started to sympathize with the ideas of the Illuminati order, and wrote about them enthusiastically to György Aranka: "their goals are... evertere superstitionem, opprimere Tyrannismum, benefacere (Latin: liquidation of superstitions, collapse of the tyranny, benefaction)... is it not the sweetest happiness of life?".

=== Legal career (1783–1785) ===
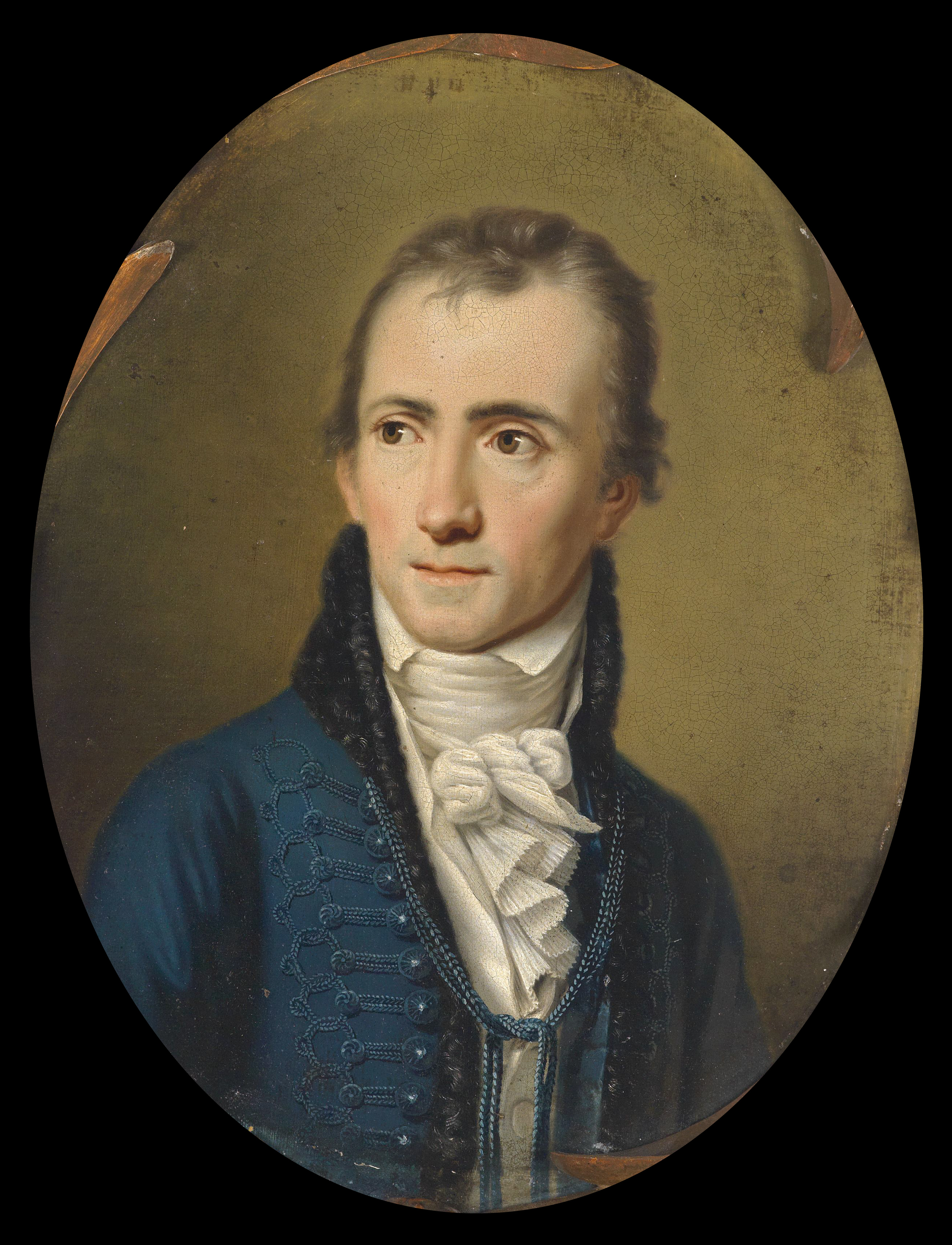
The young Kazinczy

In 1783 he returned to his mother in Alsóregmec, who encouraged him to travel to Tarnaörs to Baron Lőrinc Orczy to accept a job as honorary clerk. On October 13, 1784, he was appointed to this job and then in the same month to magistrate in Abaúj County. On November 29, he also gained a post of vice-notary in Zemplén County, but he had a disagreement with the chief notary and therefore almost immediately lost his position.

Count Lajos Török, the father of Ferenc's prospective wife, was Director-General of the Kassa School District and the Grand Master of the Masonic lodge of Miskolc and a friend of Kazinczy. On January 16, 1784, Lajos took Kazinczy among the members of the lodge. As a freemason, Kazinczy got to know several intellectuals like Angelo Soliman and Ignaz Born.

=== Inspector of education (1785–1790) ===
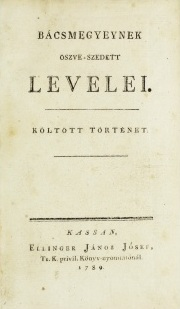
The cover of Bácsmegyeynek öszve-szedett levelei first edition (1789)

In August 1785, he traveled to Vienna to introduce himself to the Minister of Public Education, Gottfried van Swieten, and to request the inspectorate of the county schools of the following Counties: Szepes, Sáros, Zemplén, Ung, Bereg, Gömör, Torna, Abaúj, Borsod, Heves and the autonomies of Jászság és Kiskunság. On November 11, he was nominated for this position, which he held for five years.

From 1785 to 1790, Kazinczy was known as the "apostle of renewing Hungarian education". As a supervisor, he had a well-paid job and a wide range of power. But even his school-organizing practice turned him against the churches and his brothers of faith, whom he had been friends with during the early eighties. He lived in Kassa, travelled a lot in Upper and Eastern Hungary, established and controlled schools. His superiors were satisfied with him and his results. He took over 79 functioning schools as he started working in his position. This number rose rapidly to 124, of which 19 were common schools where pupils belonging to different denominations received state-funded joint education.

Finally, he finished the translations of Salomon Gessner's idylls and published them in one book with the title Gessner Idylliumi in 1788 in Kassa. Its preface dates back to the summer of 1785 and was written to Gedeon Ráday. During his demanding work on the book, which he did with great care, he could count on the help of the author, Salomon Gessner, and, after his death, on the help of his widow. It was Kazinczy's first world-famous translation and brought him recognition and appreciation abroad. He paid particular attention to the content and stylistic fidelity, accuracy, and musical rhythm of the language.

Gessner's classical idyllic world expresses Friedrich Gottlieb Klopstock's sentimentality in a pseudo environment. His middle-class optimism keeps all disturbances away from its reader. Its Rococo emotions are remotely related to Jean-Jacques Rousseau's world of thoughts, but it is rather a sweeter and simpler happiness offering version of that. By turning away from civilization and retreating into the ancient beautiful times, Gessner criticizes society, but at the same time brings us into a middle-class ideal world. As an enlightened, emotionally educated young man, this feeling of life was no stranger to him, but he was particularly delighted with the sophisticated style of the work.

His emotional world was refined by the saloon life of Kassa, whose social pleasures he felt as delightful as the Freemasonry ceremonies which he often attended. His desires were tense between Teréz Radvánszky and Zsuzsanna Kácsándy. For the "nice companies" gathered in the saloons of the Török, Kácsándy and Bárcsay families and for female members of the Freemasonry, he addressed his Bácsmegyeynek öszve-szedett levelei (English: Collected letters of Bácsmegyey) in 1789. It was a translation of Albrecht Christoph Kayser's Adolfs gesammelte Briefe which was a pastiche of Werther. This form of translation, which differs from the principle of faithful translation followed during his works on the Gessner Idylliumi, was common in Hungarian literature at that time, but not in such a way as Kazinczy did in his Bácsmegyeynek öszve-szedett levelei. He moved the figure and scene of Kayser's original novel into the role of his friends and into the scenes of their frequent gatherings, which showed a rare example of personal self-expression in translation. In some cases, his protagonist openly attacks the estates of the realm as a limitation of freedom for humans and emotions. The first edition was indeed a great success in Hungarian public life. Ádám Pálóczi Horváth, János Földi, Mihály Csokonai Vitéz, Sándor Kisfaludy, Mihailo Vitković, Lukijan Mušicki, and Benedek Virág enthusiastically welcomed it. However, Kazinczy also received criticism from conservative writers and from his teachers in Sárospatak.

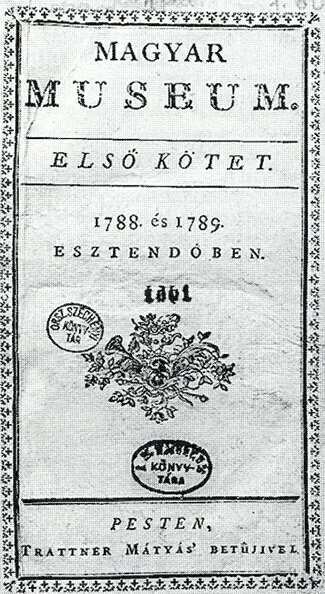
The cover of the first volume of Magyar Museum literary journal, printed by Mátyás Trattner in 1788/1789 in Pest, Hungary

On November 13, 1787, Kazinczy, together with Dávid Szabó Baróti and János Batsányi, to organize the literary movements of the Hungarian literature of that era, established the Magyar Museum periodical. This was the first literary magazine in Hungarian language. But already after the first edition, Kazinczy got into a debate on what kind of direction they wanted to give to their periodical. Kazinczy recommended the title Magyar Parnassus instead of Magyar Museum and thought of a belles-lettres-like magazine with translations and criticism. Batsányi wanted to create a more general and practical journal. The debate deepened their political disagreement. Kazinczy was a Josephinist, a follower of Joseph II. Unlike Batsányi, who was known as a member of the reform movement. Kazinczy soon left the editorial of the periodical.

One of the most difficult times of his life came as Kazinczy became so seriously ill that on May 31, 1789, he abandoned his life. In Kassa, people already talked about his death. But he suddenly got better and quickly recovered.

In November 1789, Kazinczy established his own periodical and titled it Orpheus after his own Freemason name. During its operation between 1789 and 1792, only 8 numbers were published in 2 volumes. He wrote his essays under the name Vince Széphalmy. Kazinczy faced two problems that threatened the existence of his journal and led to its closure. Firstly, besides his aim to improve the Hungarian language to a perfect level he also popularised the ideas of Voltaire and other Freemason philosophers. Secondly, his Orpheus was not so popular as the Magyar Museum and was financially unsustainable in the long run. Two years after the Orpheus, the Magyar Museum also ceased in 1794 because of its editors were accused being members of the Jacobin movement of Ignác Martinovics.

The Holy Crown was brought to Hungary in 1790. Kazinczy was a member of the Crown Guard. In the crown's room, as a member of the Honor Guard of Abaúj County, he translated Friedrich Ludwig Schröder's Hamlet and wrote his letter to László Prónay, Ispán of Csanád, in which he spoke in favor of Hungarian acting. He went to Kassa, and later to Buda, when the efforts of Hungarian acting intensified there. Between September and October in 1790, he started to organize with the help of Pál Ráday the acting in Buda in the Hungarian language. However, he had to travel home due to his official affairs.

In his Hadi és Más Nevezetes Történetek (English: Military and Other Remarkable Stories), he took sides against the student language (Latin language) and later published an impulsive article in favour of the introduction of the Hungarian language in schools and public life.

After the death of Joseph II, the earlier system collapsed. The next emperor, Leopold II abolished the common schools in 1791, and Kazinczy's office was cancelled. He lost his job for the reason that "I am not a Roman Catholic", he wrote later in a letter.

He did not want to apply for a job as an officer again. But on request of his mother and his uncle, András Kazinczy, he travelled to Vienna on May 7 to meet the emperor, who was then in Pisa. Kazinczy returned to Pest on a ship, and after ten days, he went to Székesfehérvár to meet Benedek Virág and Ádám Pálóczi Horváth. From there, he came back to Vienna, where he was welcomed by the Crown Prince Francis on August 15, but his request was not heard. In Vienna, Kazinczy made a friendship with József Hajnóczy. Kazinczy arrived home on September 10 and spent the winter in Alsóregmec.

=== Alsóregmec (1791–1794) ===
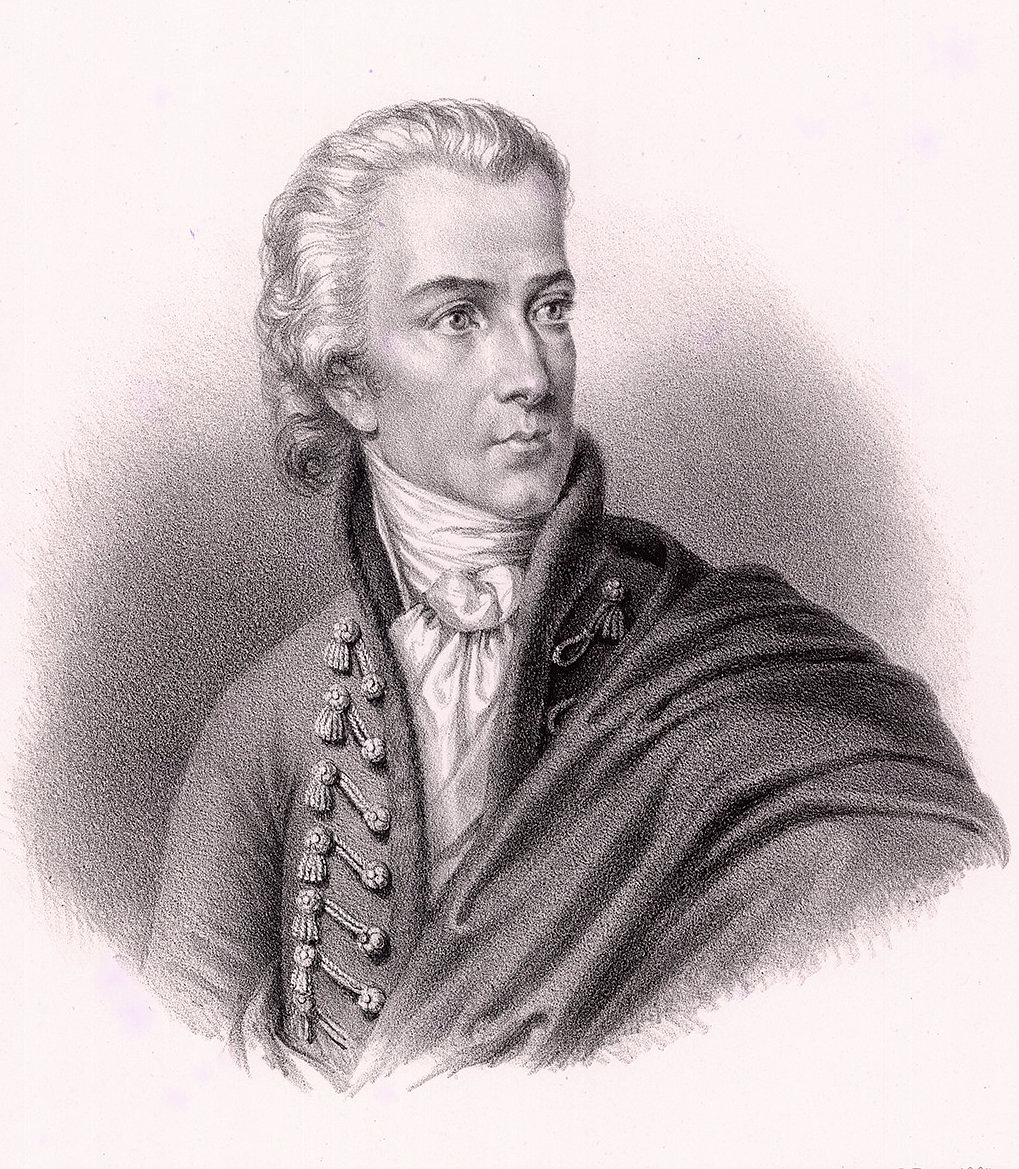
Portrait of Ferenc Kazinczy by Friedrich John and Vincenz Georg Kininger from 1804

After the death of Leopold II his successor, Francis I, came to the throne. He convoked the National Assembly in Buda. In May 1792 Kazinczy sat in the Lower Chamber as an envoy of Baron Ferenc Vécsey. On June 17 he went to the emperor to apply for the secretary position of the chamber of the royal court. But this office was already reserved by József Hajnóczy.

After the end of the National Assembly Kazinczy returned home and worked in Alsóregmec for a year and a half until 1794. This time of his life was especially productive. He published one after another his translated and original pieces: Helikoni virágok 1791. esztendőre (English: Flowers of Helicon for the year 1791, Pozsony 1791), Lanassza (tragedy in 4 acts, after Lemierre, Pozsony 1793), Sztella (drama 5 acts, after Johann Wolfgang von Goethe's work, Pozsony 1794.) A vak lantos (after Leonhard Wächter's work). In addition, he published the tales of Gotthold Ephraim Lessing in the translation of his friend János Aszalai with his own adaptation at his own expense. He translated also: Helikoni virágok volume 2, first 10 songs of Friedrich Gottlieb Klopstock's Der Messias in prose, one part of Christoph Martin Wieland's Die Gratien, Gotthold Ephraim Lessing's Emilia Galotti, William Shakespeare's Macbeth, Johann Wolfgang von Goethe's Brüder, Egmont and Clavigo, two plays from Molière: Le Mariage forcé and Le Médecin malgré lui, Pietro Metastasio's Temistocle; idylls from Salomon Gessner's 15 times revised and a philosophical play from Samuel Christian Hollmann Die Oekonomie der Natur.

During that time he experienced that several enlightened policies of Joseph II which were born in the spirit of Absolutism had been repealed and he thought that the system shifted in the wrong direction. He made an intense attack on the existing order in his translation of Christoph Martin Wieland's Sokrates mainomenos oder die Dialoge des Diogenes von Sinope which was published in 1793. His dominant worldview reflects in the book with the arrogance of the clerics, the abandonment of the existing society, and the escape from this world. It was quickly banned.

Menyhért Szulyovszky, a member of Ignác Martinovics's Jacobin movement, handed over to him the Forradalmi Káté (English: Revolutionary Doctrines) during the county assembly. On the inauguration of the chief-ispán of Nagykároly (today Carei, Romania), Ferenc Kazinczy and his brother Dienes Kazinczy disputed, together with Ferenc Szentmarjay and György Szlávy, joining Ignác Martinovics's Jacobin movement. In the beginning Kazinczy felt insecure to copy the Forradalmi Káté, but Szentmarjay dispelled his concerns. Kazinczy liked the idea of the "bloodless revolution" which the movement propagated.

=== In captivity (1794–1801) ===
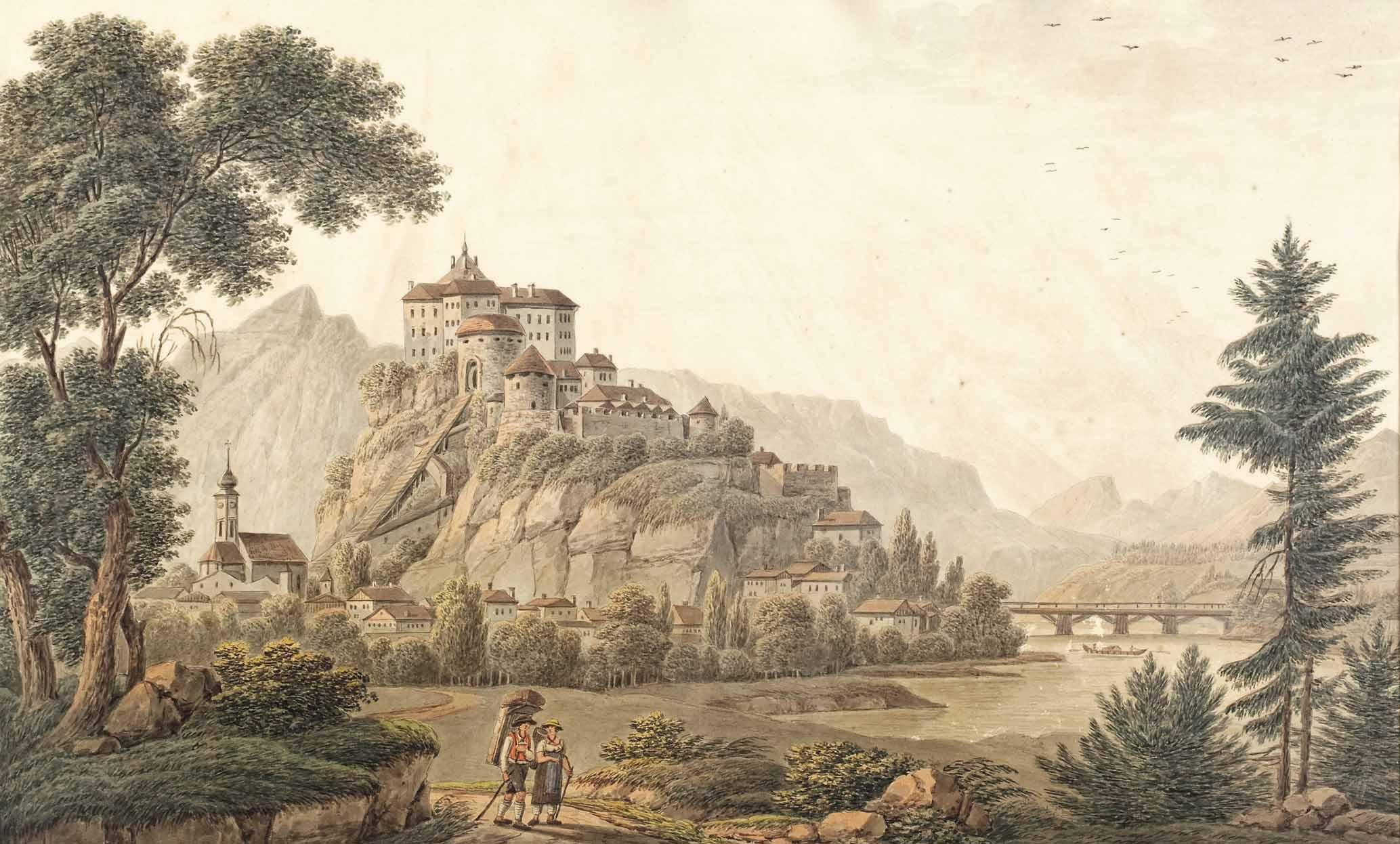
The Fortress of Kufstein in Tyrol, Austria where Kazinczy was held in captivity

He was arrested on December 14, 1794, at his mother's house in Alsóregmec. He was brought to Buda and had to wait for the judgement in the Franciscan monastery of Buda. On May 8, 1795, the blood court sentenced him to death and his cattle had to be taken away. The decision was confirmed by the seven-person board. For three weeks he lived in the shadow of a sure death. Then partly by the intervention of his relatives, the emperor changed his sentence to imprisonment for an uncertain time.

He stayed in Buda until September 27. Then he was taken to Brünn (today Brno, Czech Republic), in the prison of the Špilberk Castle where he arrived on October 7. He lived in a damp, underground jail and got so sick that he could not get up from his bed. Sometimes his stationery were taken away from him; then he wrote with rust paint and rarely with his own blood. He used as pen a kneaded tin piece from the window. When he was allowed to use pen and ink he sat at his table and corrected his earlier translations or was working on new ones. Later his life conditions became better. On the order of Archduke Joseph he was placed on an upper floor on December 21 where he could live at his own expense and could use his books.

On January 6, 1796, he was brought to the Prison of Obrowitz (today Zábrdovice, Czech Republic) near Brno, and on June 22, 1799, he was transferred further to Kufstein Fortress.

On June 30, 1800, his captors fearing the approaching French armies, he was taken first to Bratislava and then to Pest and finally to Munkács (today Mukachevo, Ukraine).

On June 28, 1801, Kazinczy received amnesty from the king, who set him free and allowed him to return home. He spent a total of 2387 days (roughly 6½ years) in prison. He eternalized this part of his life in his book Fogságom naplója (English: Diary of my captivity).

=== Later years ===
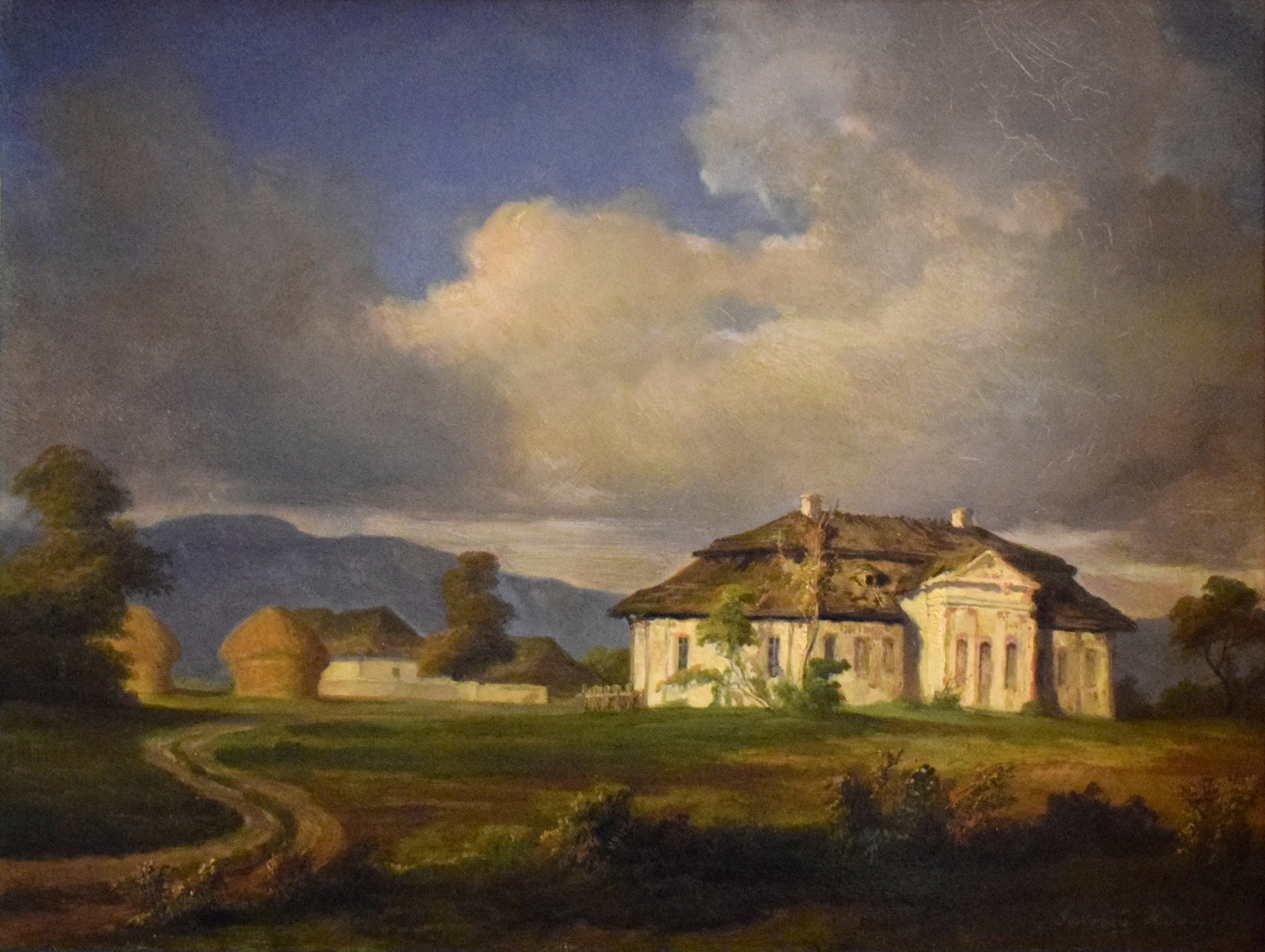
His country house in Széphalom

Following his release from captivity his fellow writers welcomed him gladly. But Kazinczy withdrew from the public.

When he was imprisoned, the value of his property was about twenty thousand forints, of which a significant part was spent on the cost of his captivity. He had nothing more than his grapefield and his hill in Kisbányácska near Sátoraljaújhely which he called Széphalom (English: Nice Hill). In the winter of 1804 he again became seriously ill, but was luckily cured by József Szentgyörgyi, the chief doctor of Debrecen, in the same year. Szentgyörgyi became his friend and so they corresponded a lot in later years.

In 1806 he settled in Széphalom, where only three rooms were ready from the new mansion. The love of his mother and her joy in the growing family somewhat compensated for the sufferings that had not come to an end with his release. He was constantly struggling with financial difficulties, since after his imprisonment, he had to clear the accounts he was charged with, and later he had to raise his children.

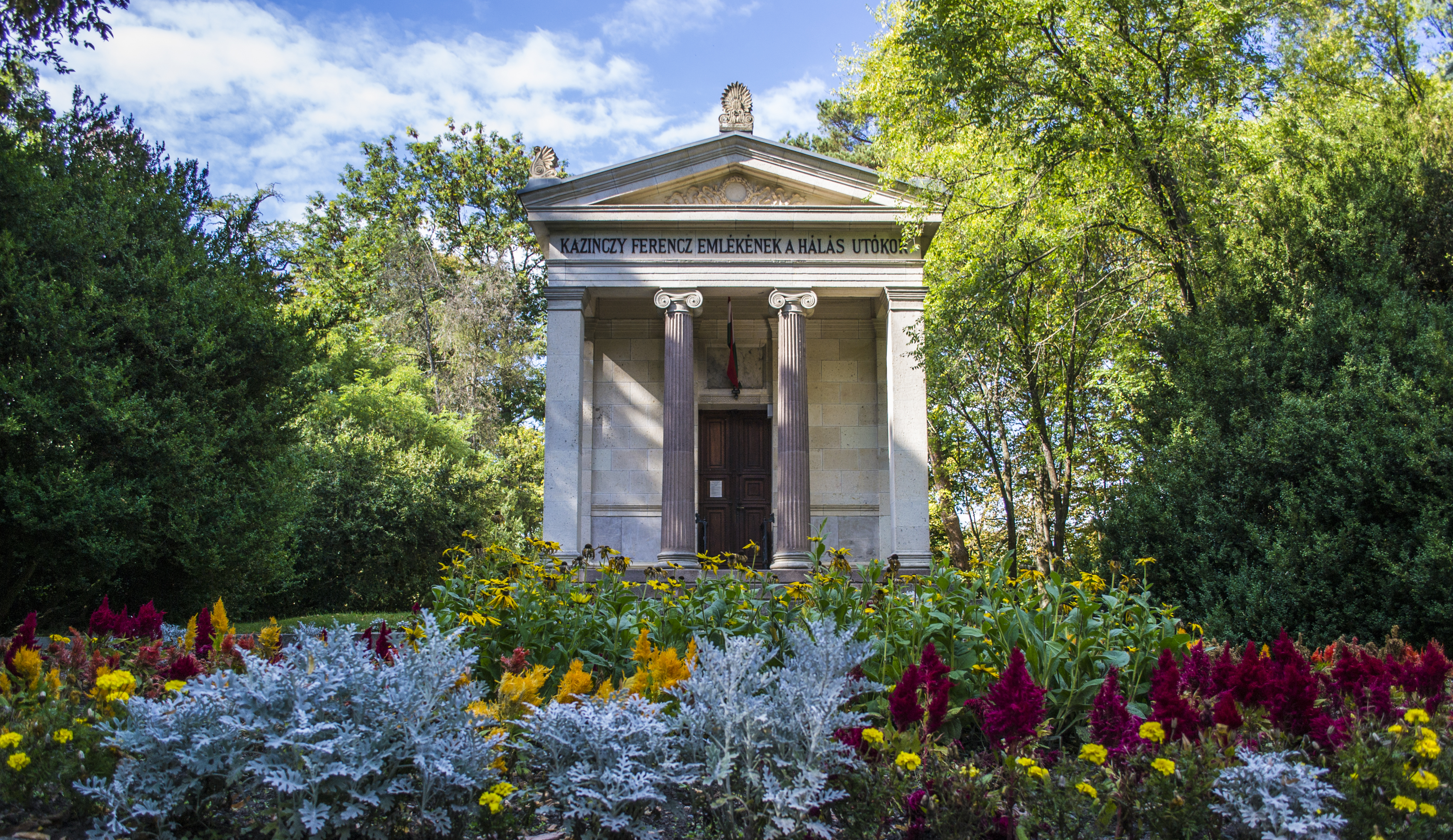
The Mausoleum of Ferenc Kazinczy in Széphalom, Sátoraljaújhely, was built by Miklós Ybl in 1873.

Shortly afterwards he married Sophie Török, daughter of his former patron, and retired to his small estate at Széphalom or "Fairhill", near Sátoraljaújhely (Széphalom is already a part of Sátoraljaújhely), in the county of Zemplén. In 1828 he took an active part in the conferences held for the establishment of the Hungarian academy, in the historical section of which he became the first corresponding member. He died of cholera at Széphalom.

== Legacy ==
Kazinczy, known for possessing great beauty of style, was inspired greatly by the masterpieces of Lessing, Goethe, Wieland, Klopstock, Ossian, La Rochefoucauld, Marmontel, Molière, Metastasio, Shakespeare, Sterne, Cicero, Sallust, Anacreon, and many others. He also edited the works of Sándor Báróczi (Pest, 1812, 8 vols.) and of the poet Zrínyi (1817, 2 vols.), and the poems of Dayka (1813, 3 vols.) and of John Kis (1815, 3 vols.).

A collected edition of his works, consisting for the most part of translations, was published at Pest, 1814–1816, in nine volumes. original productions (Eredeti Munkái), largely made up of letters, were edited by Joseph Bajza and Francis Toldy at Pest, 1836–1845, in five volumes. Editions of his poems appeared in 1858 and 1863.

In 1873, a neo-classicistic memorial hall (mausoleum) and graveyard was built in Széphalom in his memory, based on the plans of the architect Miklós Ybl. Today it belongs to the Ottó Herman Museum. The Museum of the Hungarian Language is intended to be built here, whose cornerstone has been laid in the park.

== Personal life ==
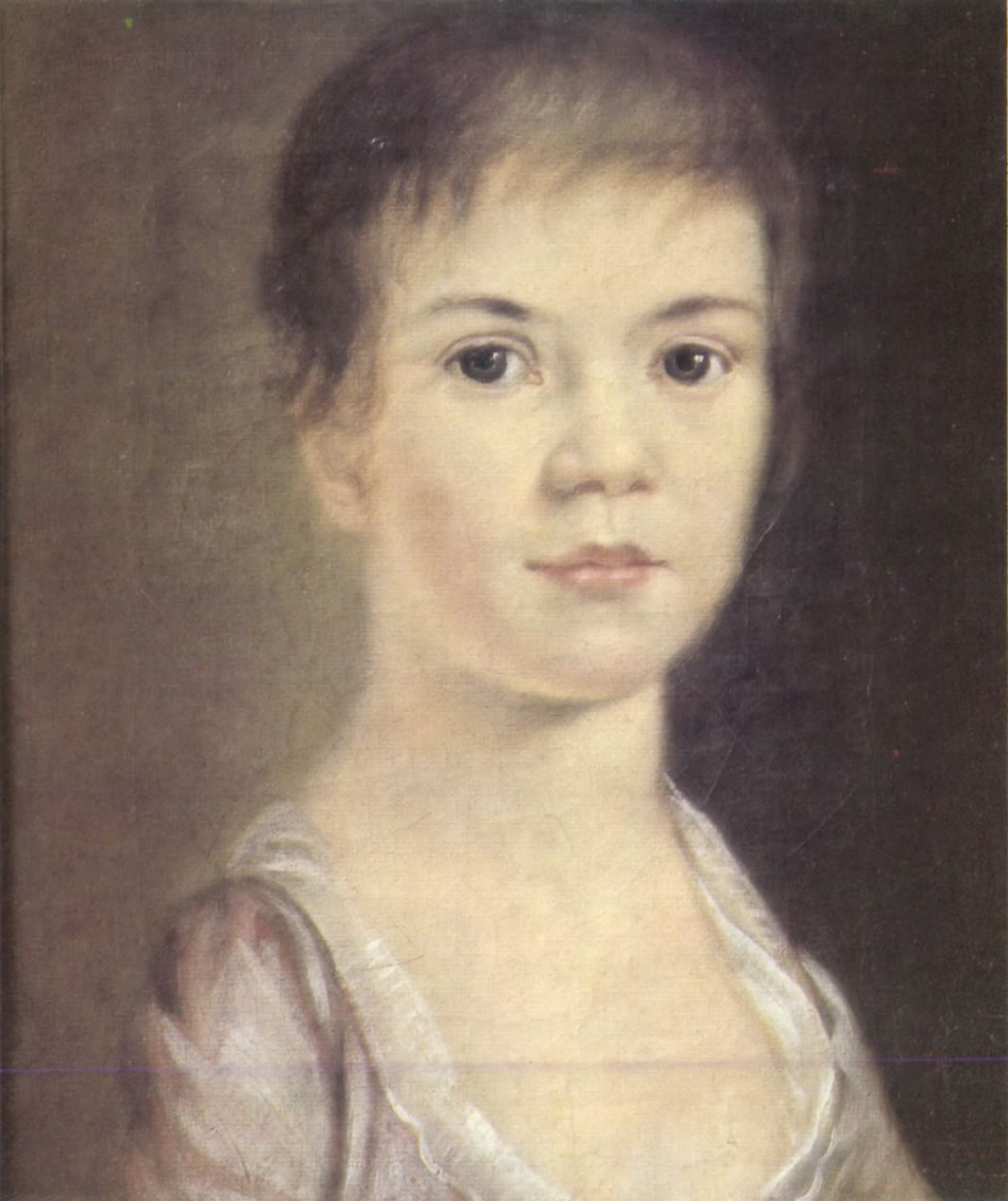
Sophie Török was Kazinczy's love and later his wife

On November 11, 1804, he married the daughter of his former principal, Count Lajos Török in Nagykázmér (today Kazimír, Slovakia). His wife, Sophie Török, was 21 years younger than Kazinczy and came from a rich and prominent family. Kazinczy regarded himself for years not appropriate to her. He writes in his diary why he chose Sophie:

"It is decided that I marry (...) But who? where? how? I could not rest my mind. Later a thought flew through my head if only I could find me somebody in whom at least half so much culture, mature soul and kindness are as in Sophie. I did not dare dream about Sophie. (...) However, as I was wanting to chase my memories about Sophie out of my mind, the more stubbornly the thought stuck in."

— Ferenc Kazinczy

Sophie married Kazinczy because of love, and her father regarded his daughter's husband as a friend of his.

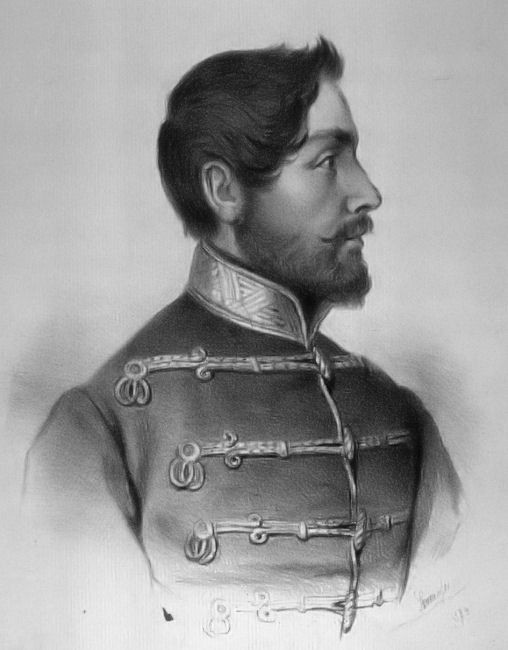
Lajos Kazinczy, Ferenc's youngest son, is a national hero of Hungary.

They lived together for almost 27 years, often struggling with serious financial problems, but according to their diaries and letters their life together was happy. They had four sons and four daughters. Unfortunately the firstborn daughter died in infancy in 1806.

- Iphigenia (1805–1806)
- Eugenia (1807–1903)
- Thalia (1809–1866)
- Márk Emil Ferenc (1811–1890)
- Antal Sophron Ferenc (1813–1885)
- Anna Iphigenia (1817–1890)
- Bálint Cecil Ferenc (1818–1873)
- Lajos (1820–1849)

While Kazinczy organized the Hungarian literary life, Sophie was most concerned with housekeeping and child rearing. She also taught other children of friends beside her own. According to Kazinczy's writings she knew well the herbs and the preparation of home-made medicine and therefore she could help many infected people during the cholera epidemic of 1831.

The youngest son of Kazinczy became a soldier and later an army colonel. He fought in the Hungarian War of Independence of 1848–1849 and after the defeat of the uprising he was executed. He was afterwards named the Fifteenth Martyr of Arad.

== Bibliography ==
Tövisek és virágok 1811.
Poétai episztola Vitkovics Mihályhoz 1811.
Ortológus és neológus nálunk és más nemzeteknél 1819.

== Gallery ==
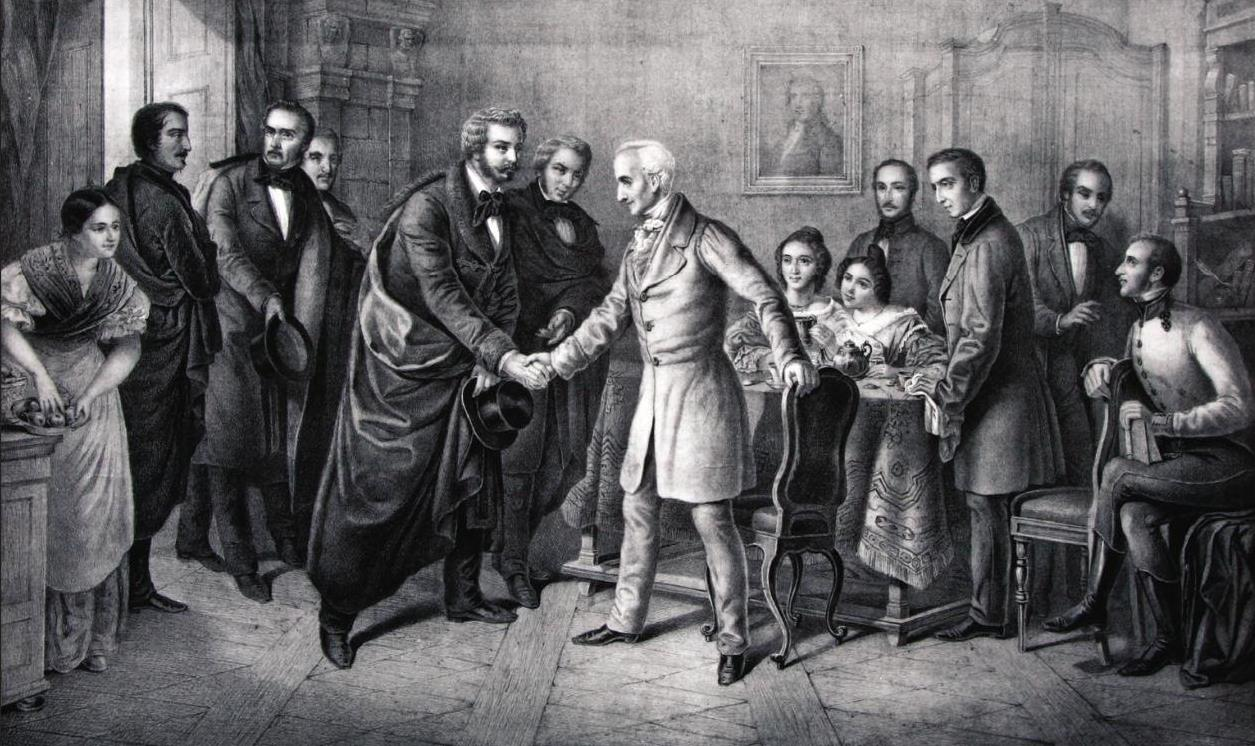
First meeting of Ferenc Kazinczy and Károly Kisfaludy in 1828, based on painting by Soma Orlai Petrich

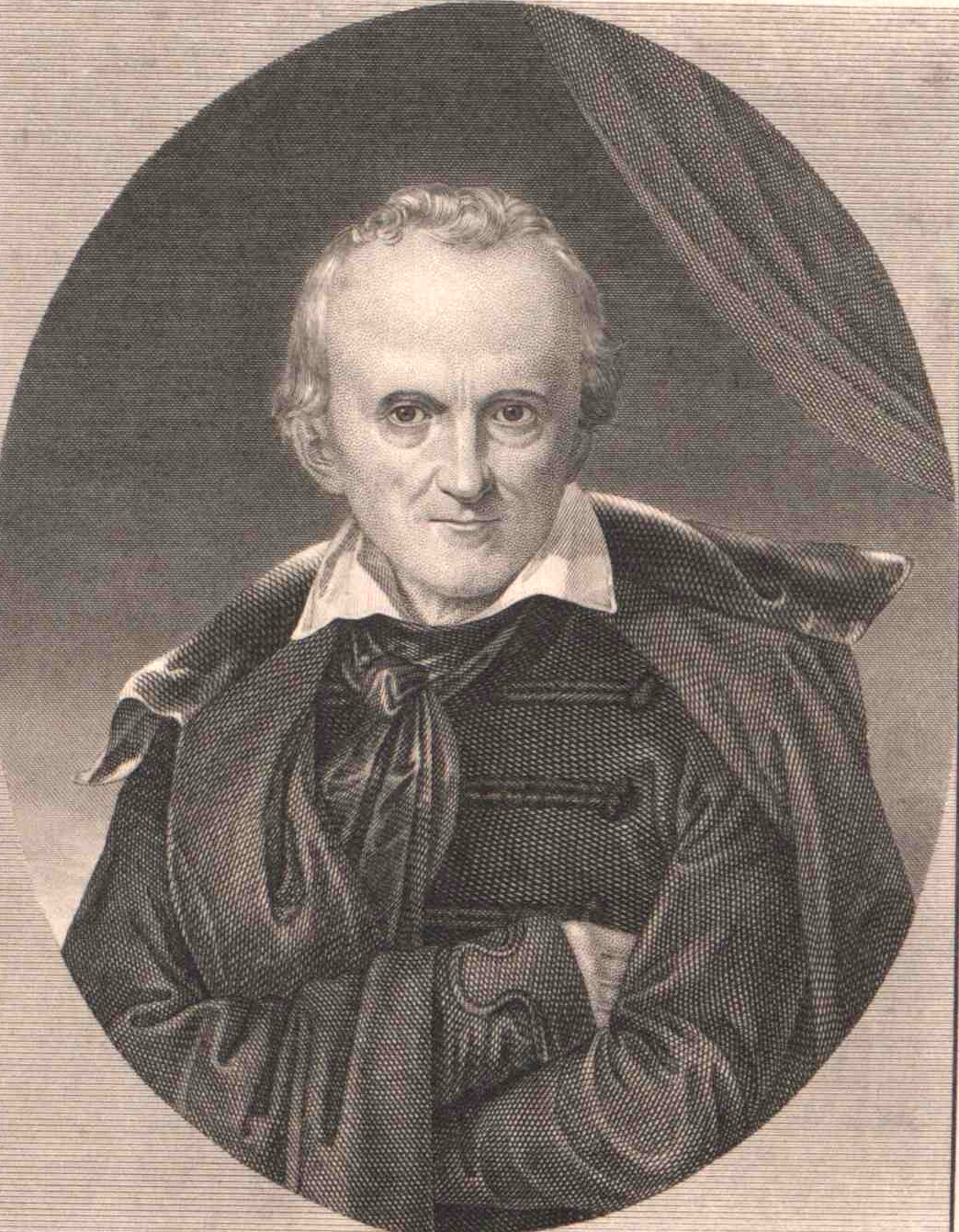

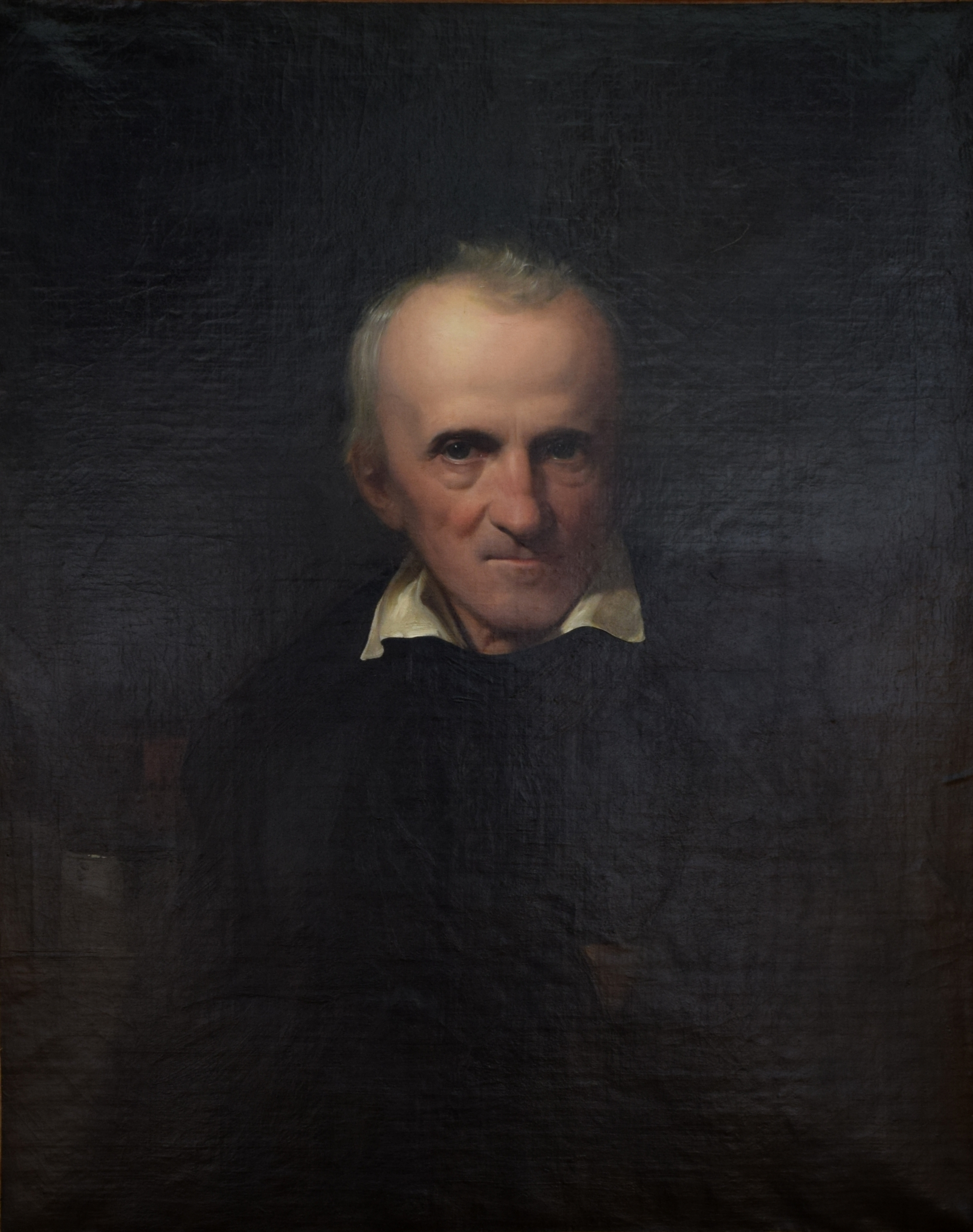

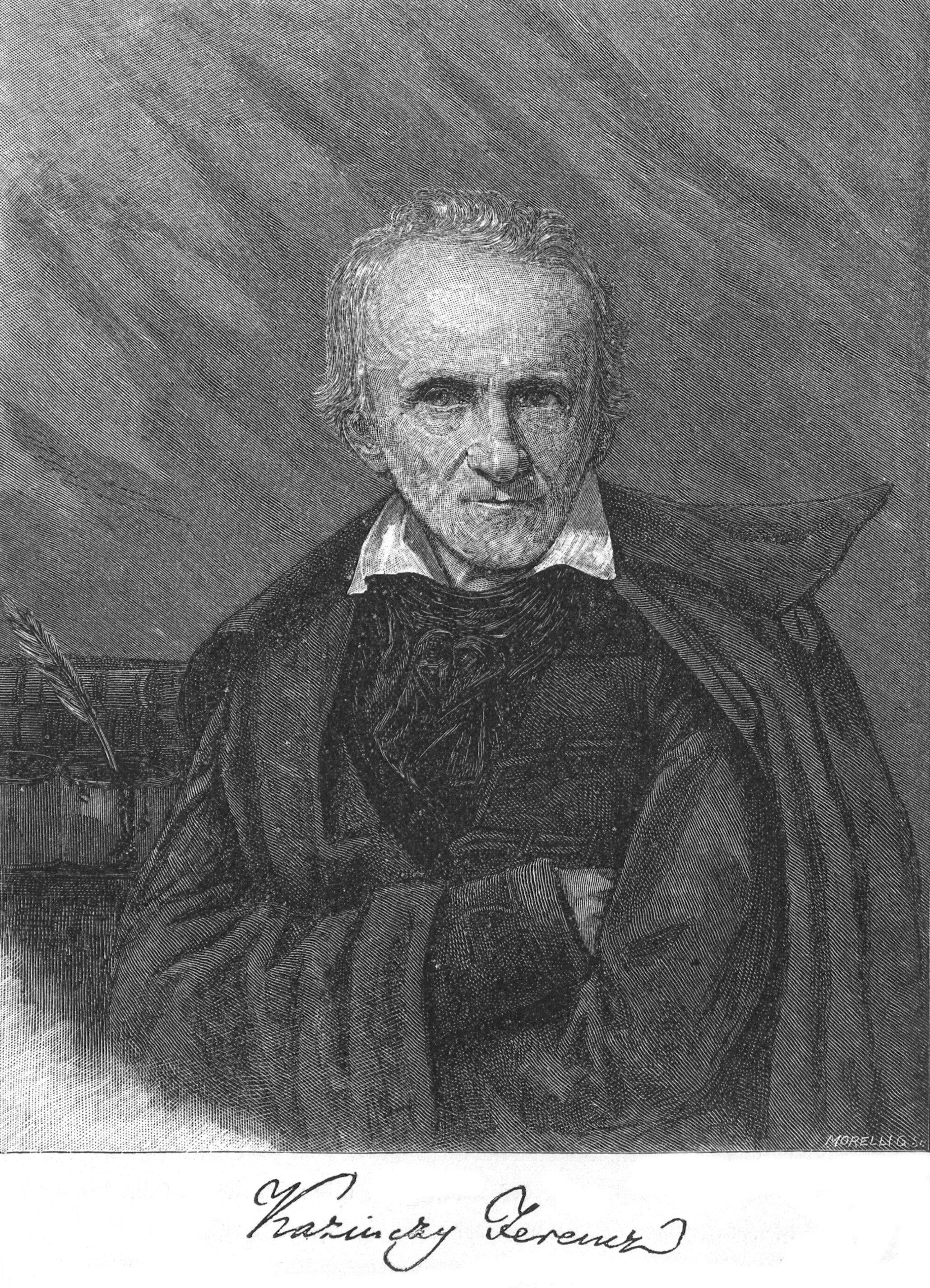

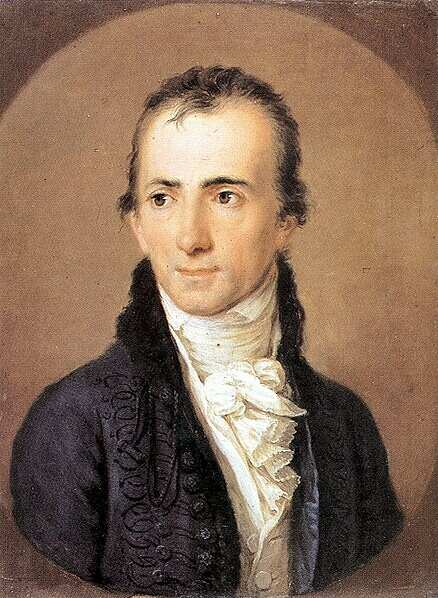

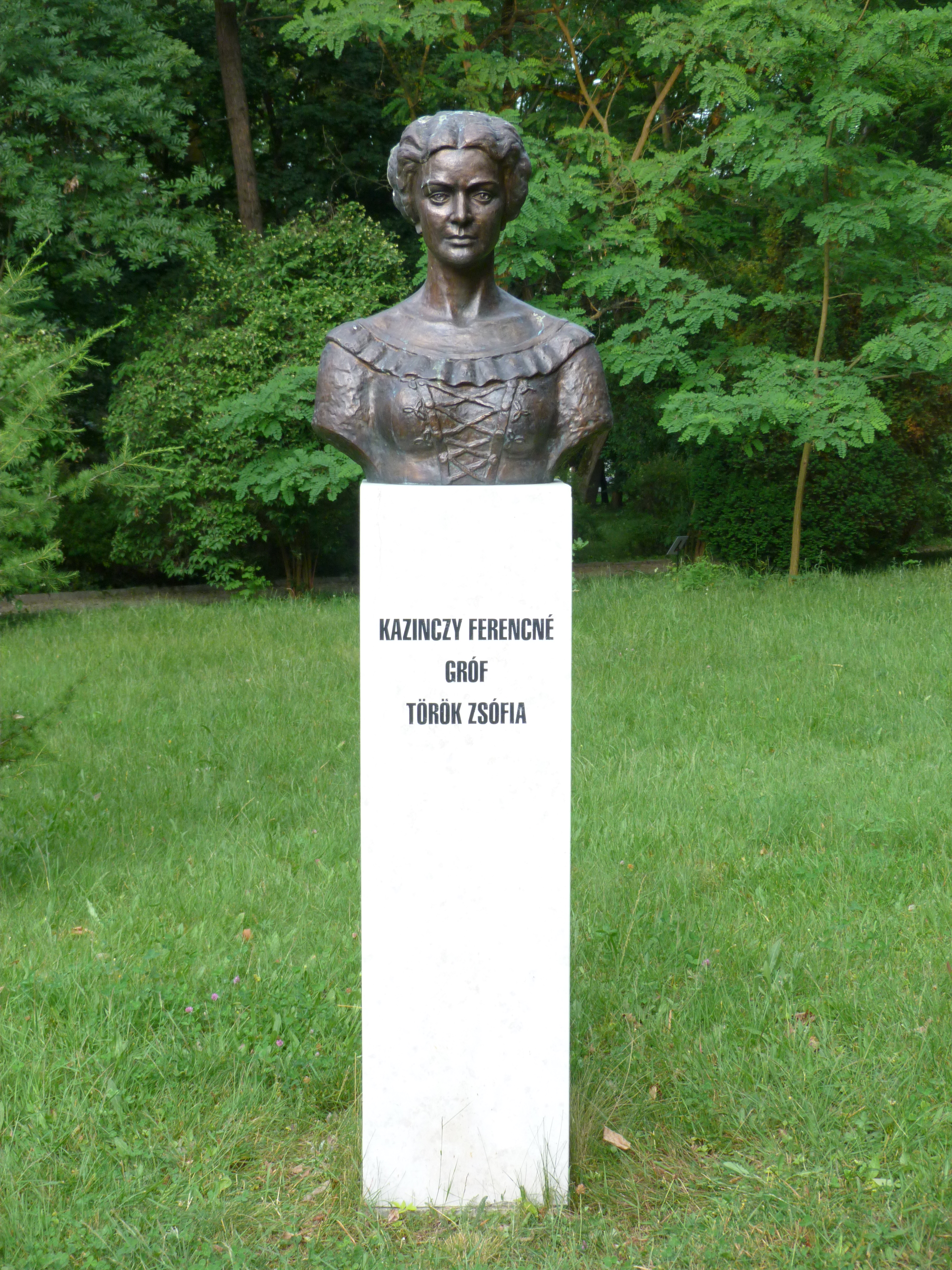

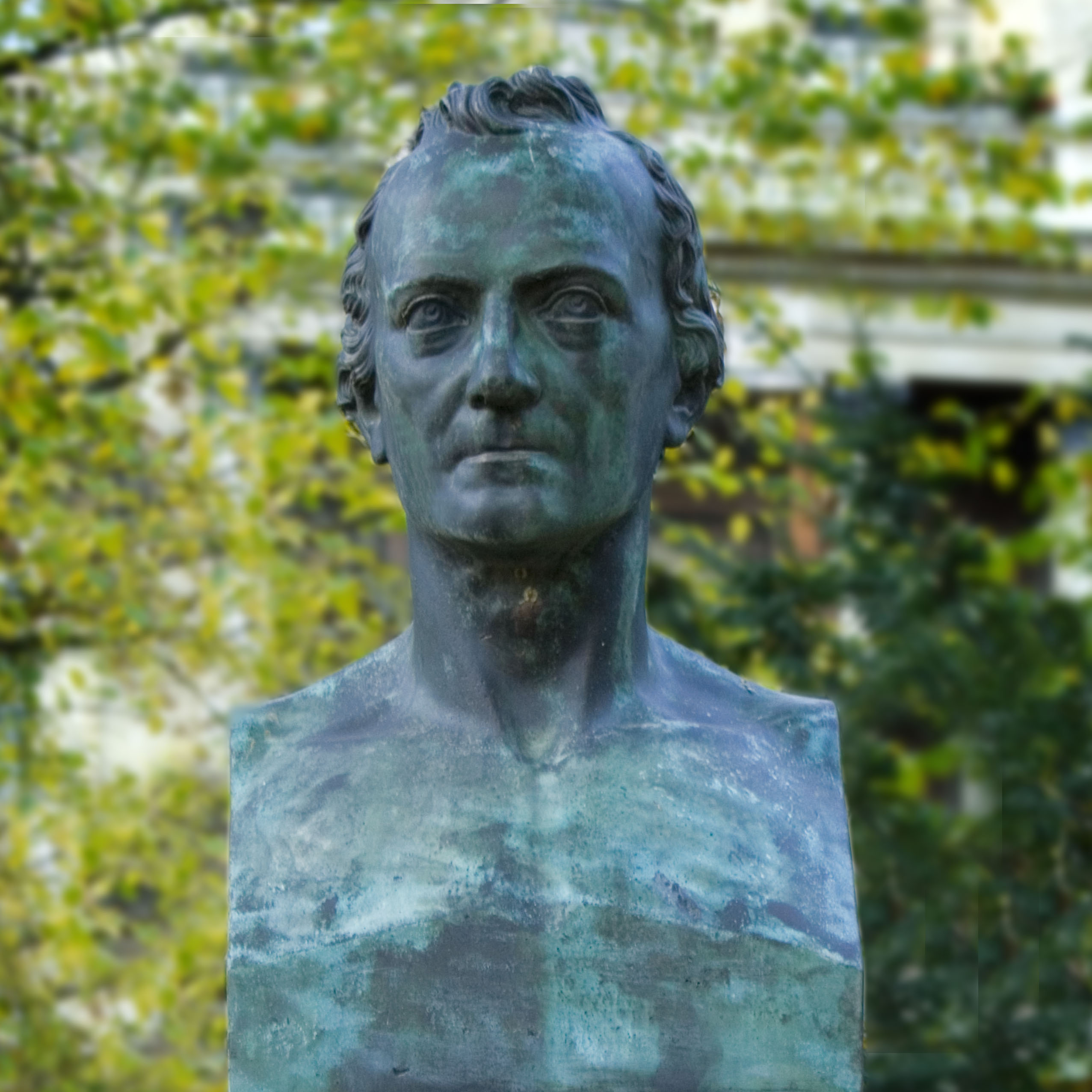

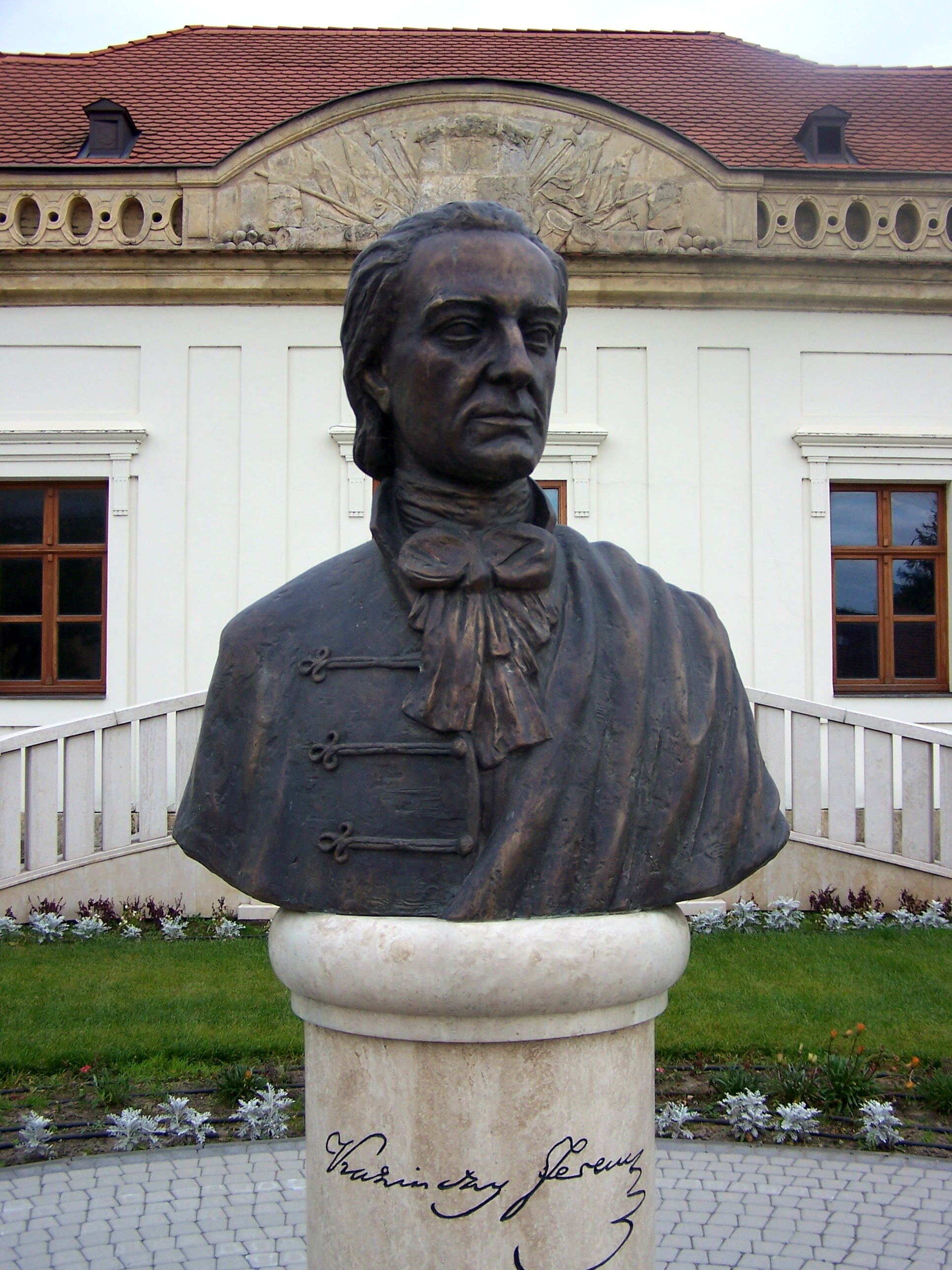

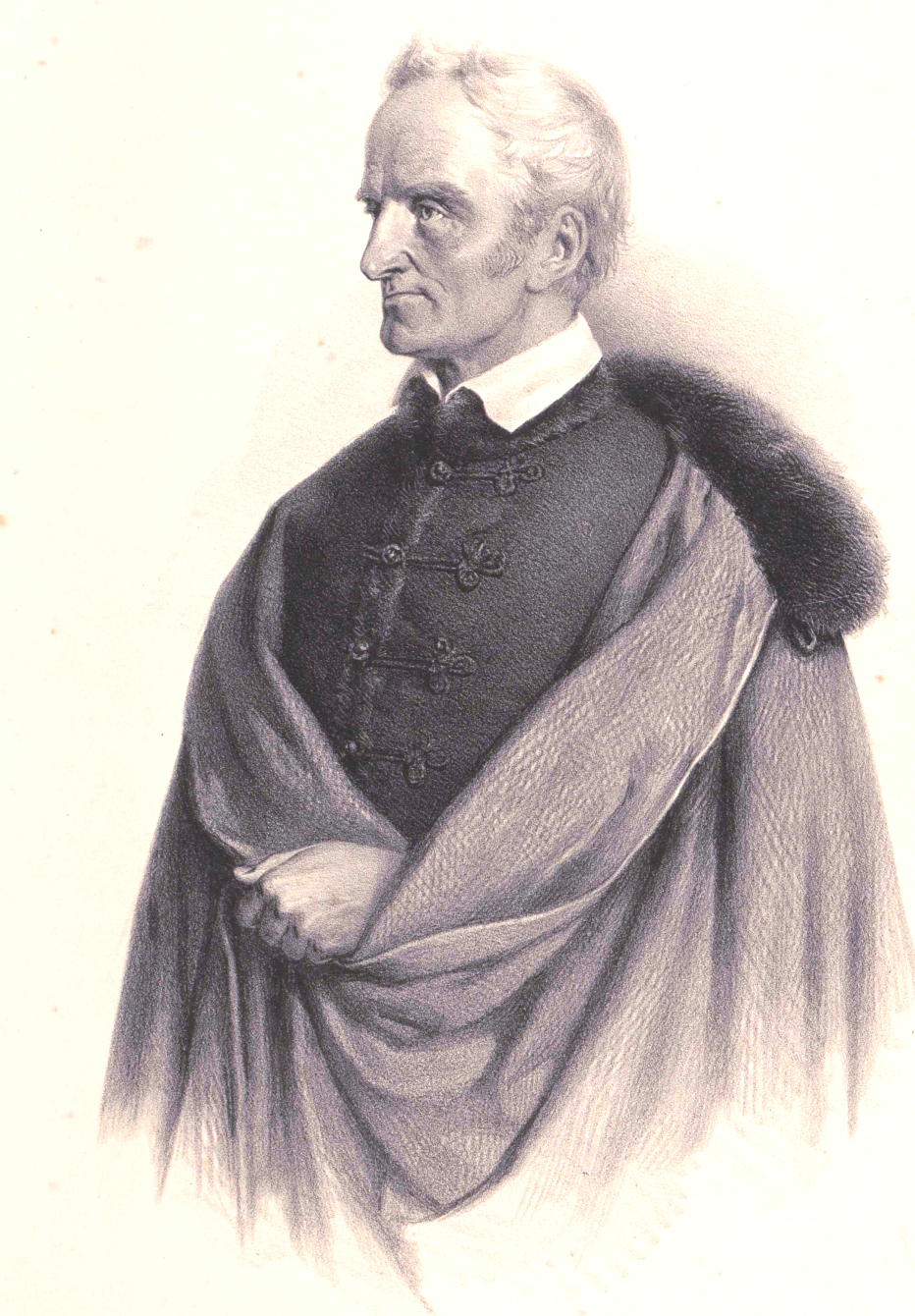

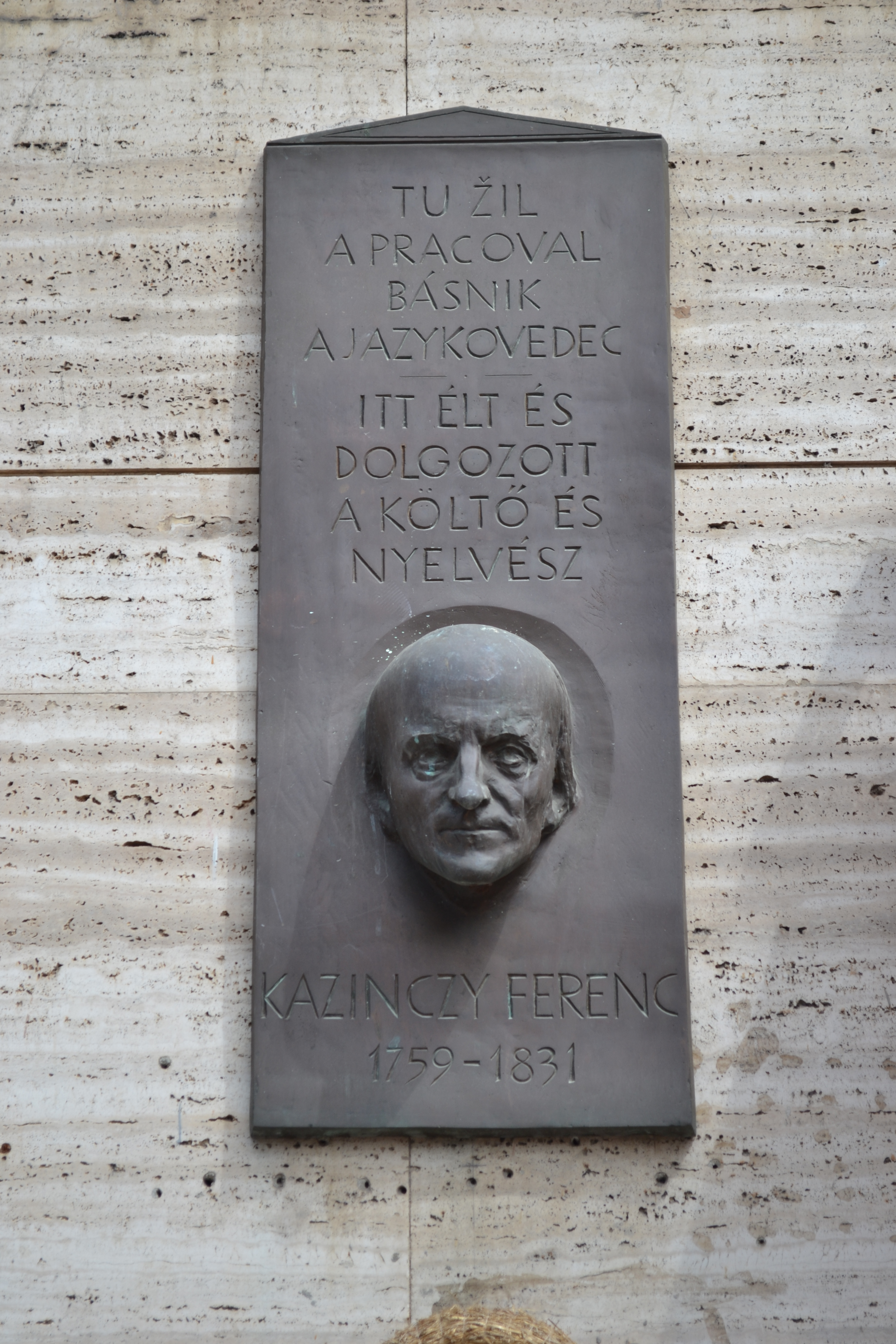

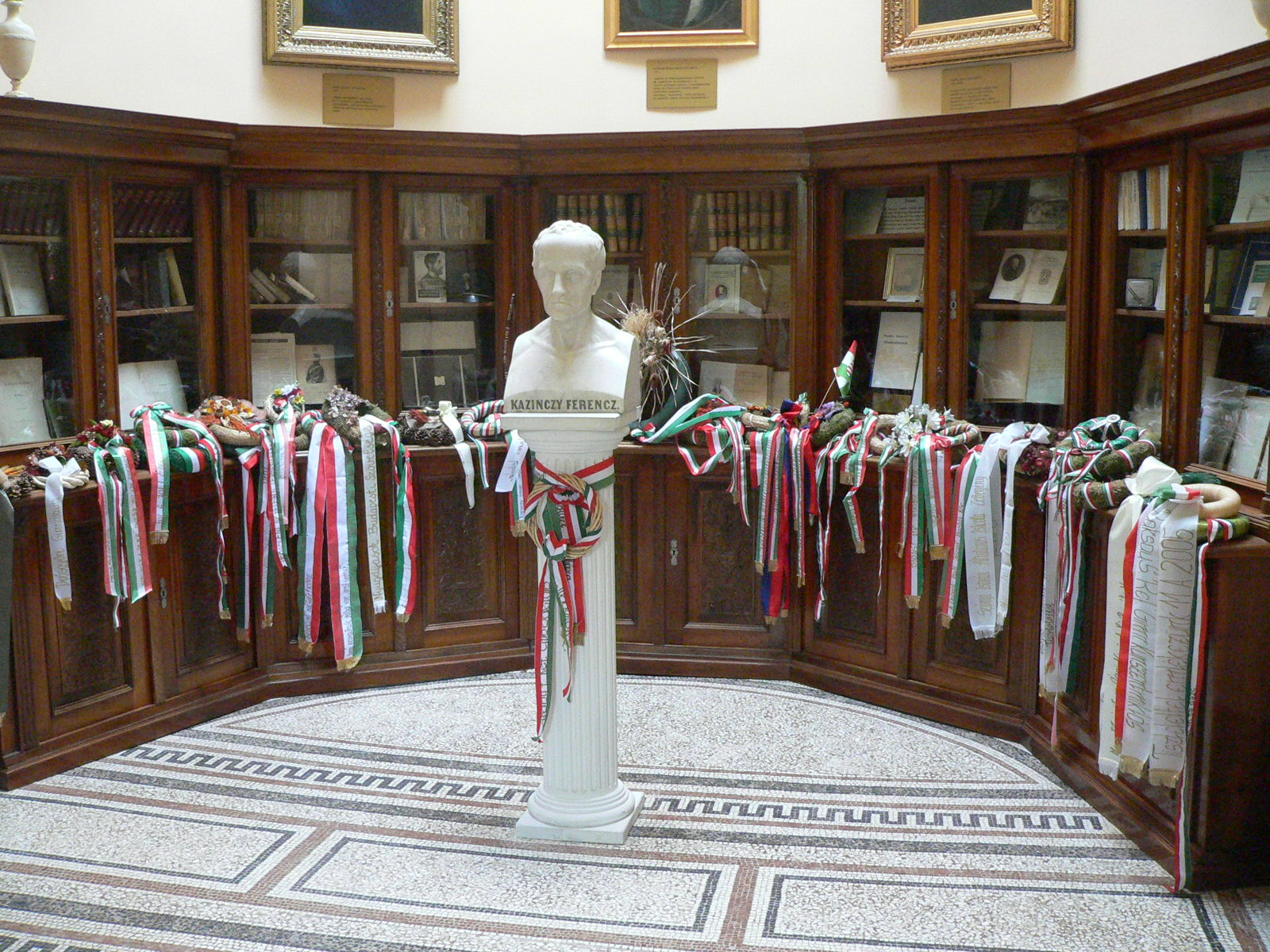

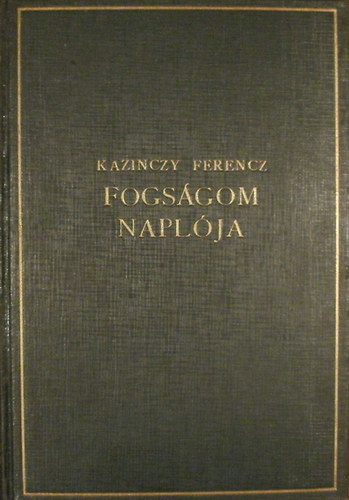

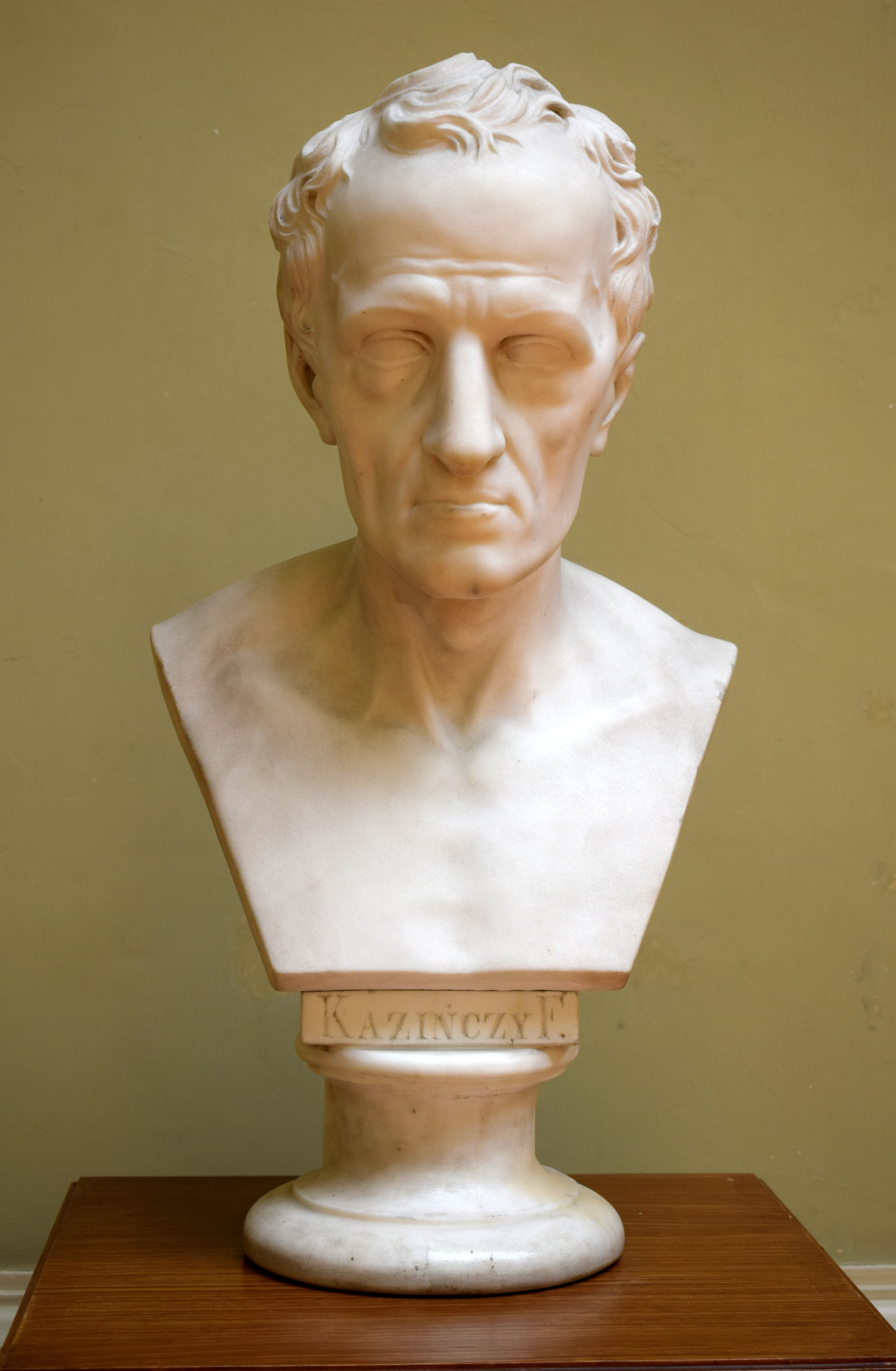

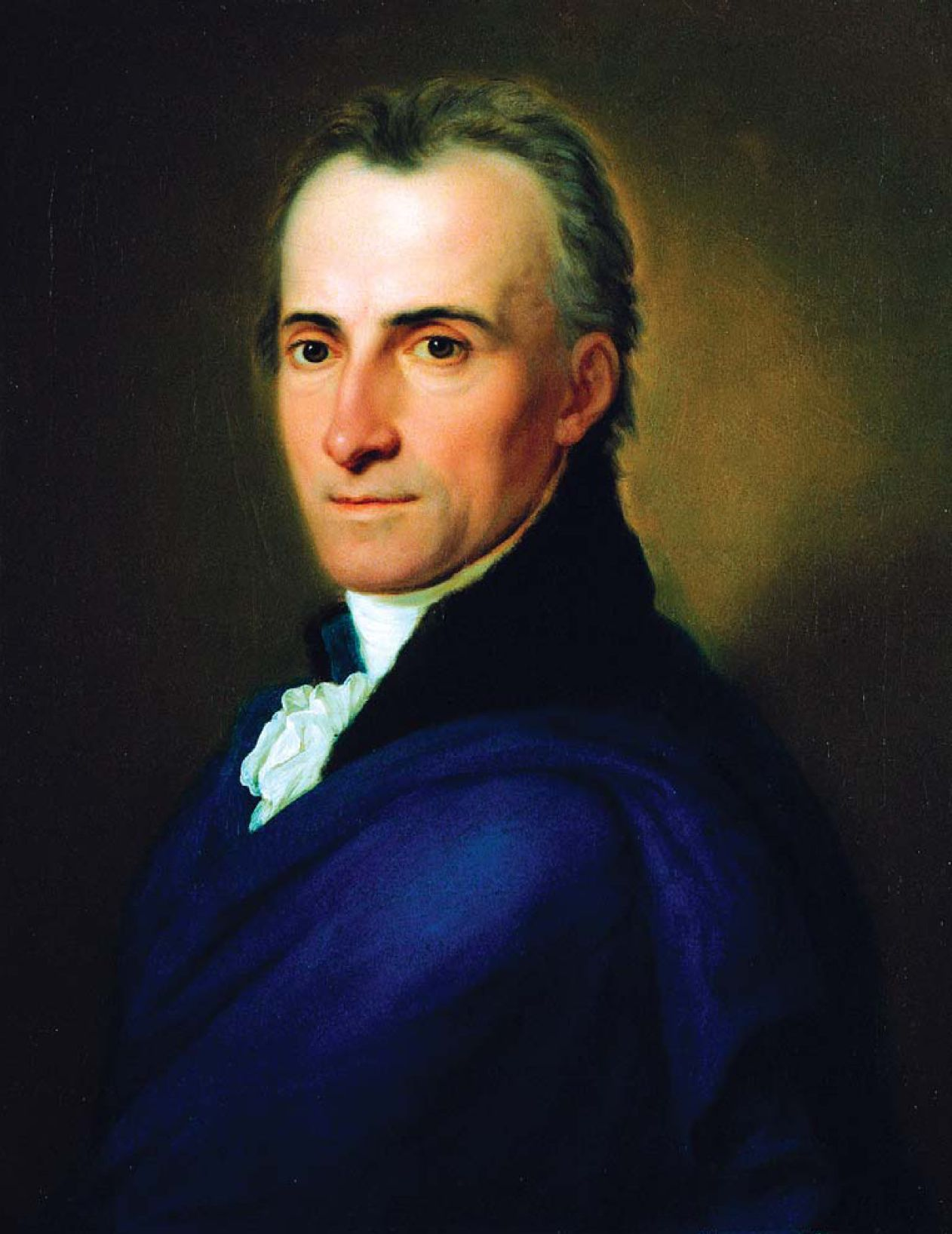

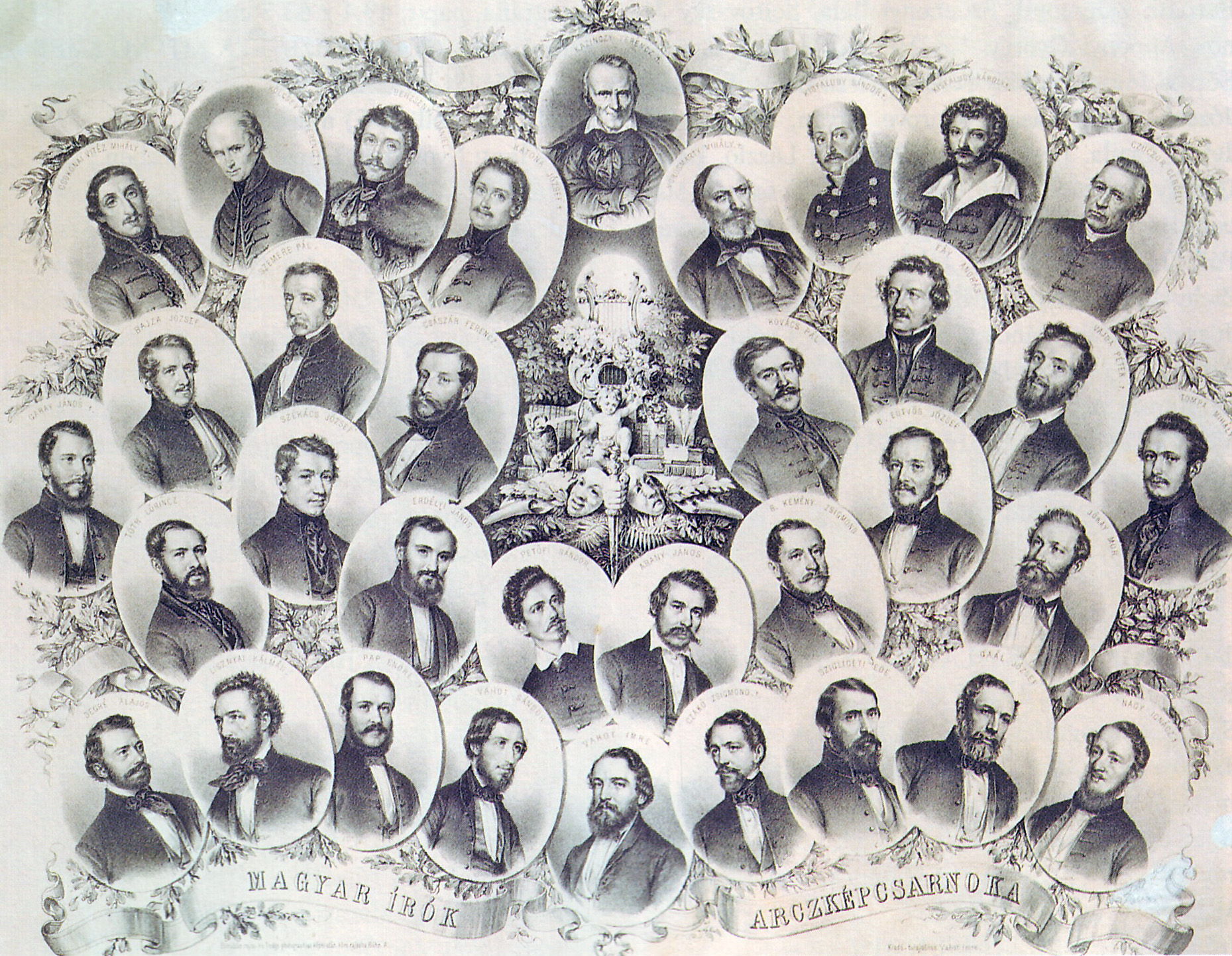

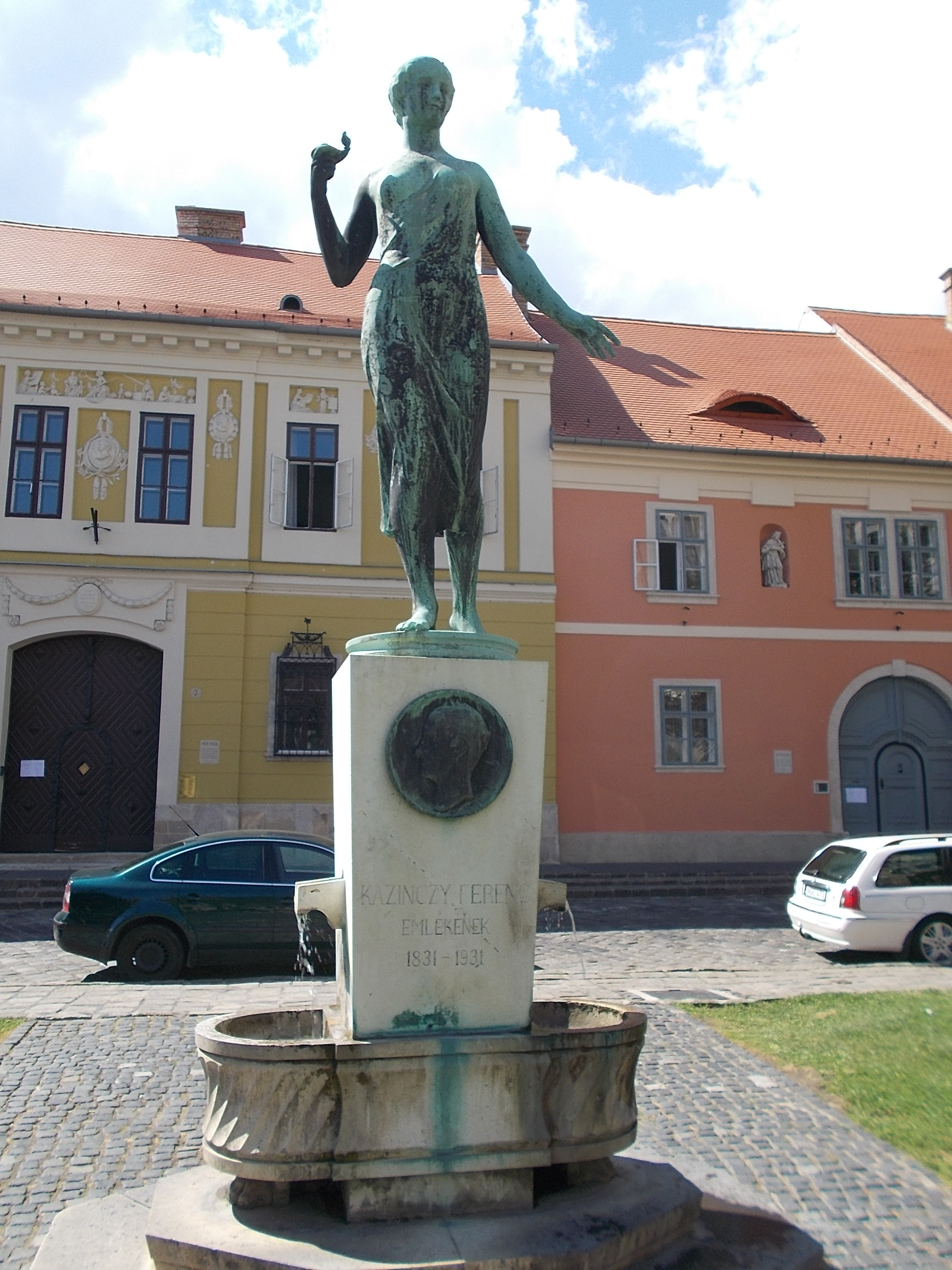

== Literature ==
- Klasszikus Magyar Irodalmi Textológiai Kutatócsoport (Hungarian Academy of Sciences - University of Debrecen) : Kazinczy Ferenc összes művei Elektronikus kritikai kiadás
- Ferenc Kölcsey : Emlékbeszéd Kazinczy Ferenc felett. A Magyar Tudós Társaság Évkönyvei. I. köt. Pest, 1833.
- Ferenc Toldy : Kazinczy Ferenc és kora. I. köt. Pest, 1859.
- Richárd Szabó : Kazinczy-album. Pest, 1860.
- Antal Csengery : Történelmi tanulmányok. II. köt. Pest, 1870
- Ferenc Toldy : A magyar költészet kézikönyve. III. köt. 2. kiad. Budapest, 1876.
- Pál Gyulai : Emlékbeszédek. Budapest, 1879.
- Péter Gerecze : Kazinczy Ferenc vallási és bölcseleti nézetei. Pécs, 1881.
- Jenő Andrássy : Kazinczy Ferenc életrajza. Pozsony, 1883.
- István Nagy : Kazinczy és Debrecen. Karcagi ref. gimnázium értesítője. 1888.
- Károly Széchy : Kazinczy otthon. Erdélyi Múzeumegylet Kiadványai. Kolozsvár, 1888.
- Károly Széchy : Kazinczy és Döbrentei. Kolozsvár, 1889.
- Zsolt Beöthy : Horatius és Kazinczy. Budapest, 1890.
- Sándor Imre : Kazinczy iskolai inspektorsága. Budapesti Szemle. 1895. évf.
- József Szinnyei : Magyar írók élete és munkái. V. köt. Budapest, 1897.
- János Váczy : Kazinczy Ferenc. Képes magyar irodalomtörténet. Szerk. Beöthy Zsolt és Badics Ferenc. I. köt. 3. kiad. Budapest, 1906.
- Jenő Vértesy : Kazinczy jelentősége. Irodalomtörténeti Közlemények, 1906. évf.
- Gyula Baros : Kazinczy Ferenc és Radvánszky Teréz. A Kisfaludy-Társaság Évlapjai. Új folyam. 42. köt. Budapest, 1908.
- Gusztáv Heinrich : Kazinczy Ferenc és az Akadémia. Akadémiai Értesítő. 1909. évf.
- Gyula Viszonta : Kazinczy Ferenc működése az Akadémiában. U. o. 1909. évf.
- Gyula Viszonta : Széchenyi és Kazinczy. U. o. 1909. évf.
- János Váczy : Kazinczy Ferenc. Budapest, 1909.
- Balázs Horváth : Kazinczy Ferenc kassai szereplése. Kassai premontrei gimnázium értesítője. 1910.
- János Váczy : Kazinczy Ferenc ősei. Turul, 1912. évf.
- János Váczy : Kazinczy Ferenc és kora. I. köt. Budapest, 1915.
- Gyula Borz : Kazinczy írói összeköttetései fogsága idejéig. Esztergom, 1916.
- György Kristóf : Kazinczy Erdélyben. Pásztortűz. 1927. évf.
- József Perényi : Aranka György és Kazinczy Ferenc. Erdélyi Irodalmi Szemle. 1927. évf.
- Géza Hegyaljai Kiss : Ismeretlen érdekességek Kazinczyról. Irodalomtörténet, 1928. évf.
- Géza Hegyaljai Kiss : Kazinczy Ferenc mint levéltáros. U. o. 1928. évf.
- Béla Hencze : Kazinczy és a francia felvilágosodás. Budapest, 1928.
- István Harsányi : Elégették-e Kazinczy Ferenc iratait 1790-ben? Irodalomtörténeti Közlemények. 1928. évf.
- Antal Meszlényi : Kazinczy Ferenc fogsága. Magyar Kultúra. 1928. évf.
- Dezső Szabó : A herceg Festetics-család története. Budapest, 1928.
- János Czeizel : Kazinczy Ferenc élete és működése. I. köt. Budapest, 1930.
- Károly Csahihen : Pest-Buda irodalmi élete 1780–1830.
- Gyula Farkas : A magyar romantika. Budapest, 1930.
- Zoltán Hegedüs : Kazinczy-ünnepély 859-ben és a Kazinczy-alap története 1870-ig. Irodalomtörténeti Közlemények. 1930. évf.
- János Czeizel : Kazinczy és Kölcsey. Szegedi áll. Baross Gábor reáliskola értesítője. 1931.
- Béla Dornyay : Kazinczy Ferenc és Tata-Tóváros. Tata, 1931.
- Albert Kardos : Ott volt-e Kazinczy a Csokonai temetésén? Debreceni Szemle. 1931. évf.
- Gábor Halász : Kazinczy emlékezete. Napkelet. 1931. évf.
- János Horváth : Kazinczy emlékezete. Budapesti Szemle. 1931. évf.
- László Négyesy : Kazinczy pályája. Budapest, 1931.
- Ferenc Biczó : Kazinczy Ferencnének, gróf Török Zsófiának, férjére vonatkozó eddig kiadatlan levelei. Kaposvári egyesületi leánygimnázium értesítője. 1932.
- Rezső Gálos : Kazinczy és a győri csata emléke. Győri Szemle. 1932. évf.
- Ferenc Jenei : Kazinczy útja Pannonhalmára. U. o. 1932. évf.
- József Gulyás : Kazinczy mint gyüjtő. Debreceni Szemle, 1932. évf.
- György Kristóf : Kazinczy és Erdély. Az Erdélyi Múzeum-Egyesület 1931. évi vándorgyűlésének emlékkönyve. Kolozsvár, 1932.
- Vilmos Tolnai : Egy Kazinczy-ereklye. Irodalomtörténeti Közlemények. 1932. évf.
