= Széphalom =

Széphalom may refer to:

- Széphalom (Budapest), city part of Budapest District II (Pesthidegkút)
- Széphalom (Sátoraljaújhely), city part of Sátoraljaújhely
