= Széphalom (Sátoraljaújhely) =

Coordinates: 48°26′07″N 21°37′36″E

- Former municipality
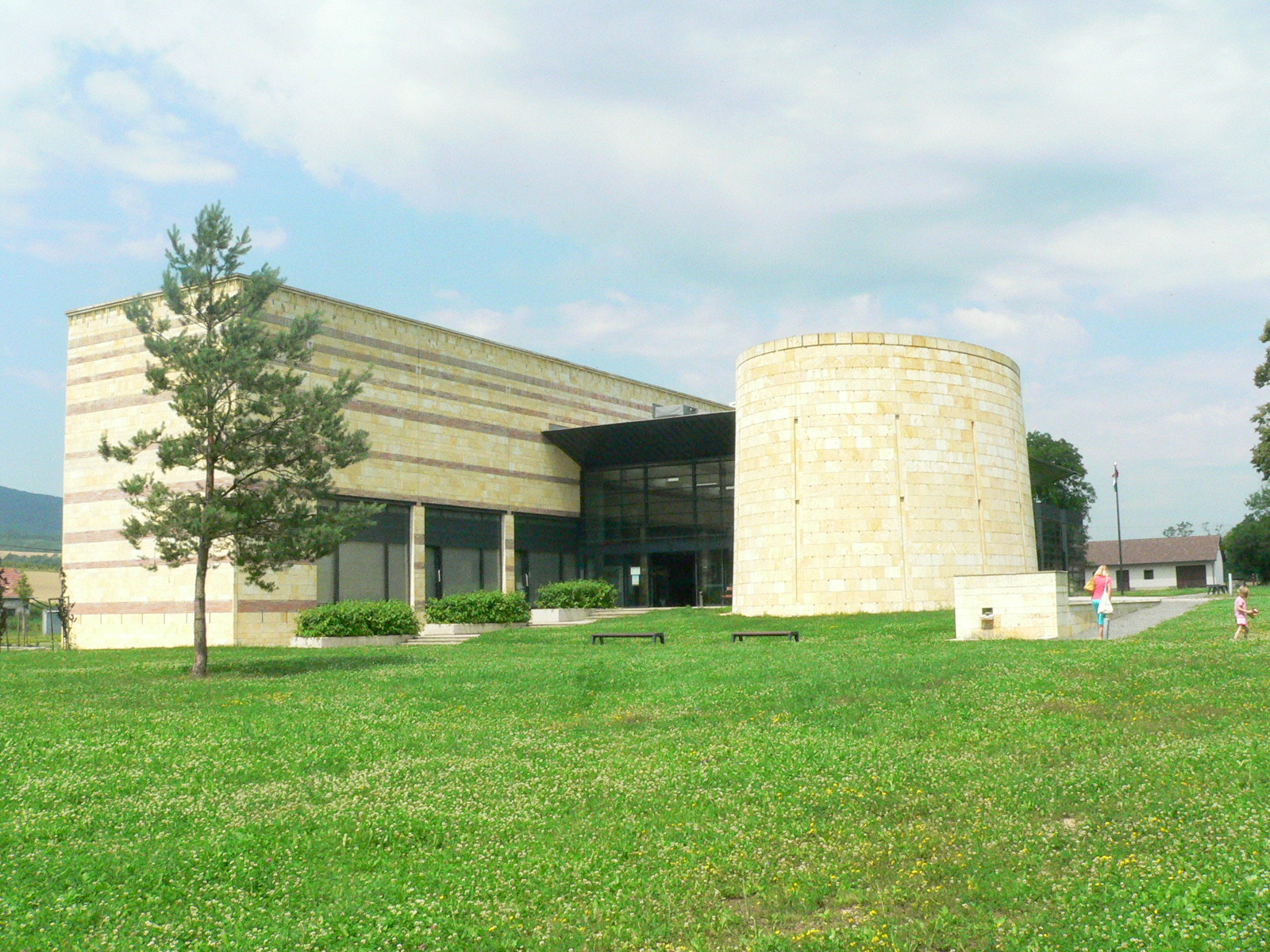
- The Museum of the Hungarian Language

- Location within Hungary
- Country: Hungary
- Regions: Northern Hungary
- County: Borsod-Abaúj-Zemplén County
- District: Sátoraljaújhely District

Population (2022)
  - Total: 448
- Time zone: UTC+1 (CET)
  - Summer (DST): UTC+2 (CEST)
- Postal code: 3945
- Area code: (+36) 47

Széphalom, formerly Kisbánya or Kisbányácska (Slovak: Malá Baňačka) was a village in Borsod-Abaúj-Zemplén County, northern Hungary. Now it is part of the town of Sátoraljaújhely.

== Geography ==
It is located about 4 kilometers north of the center of Sátoraljaújhely, right next to the Hungarian-Slovak border.

The neighboring settlements are: Alsóregmec to the north, Mikóháza to the northwest, and Rudabányácska to the southwest. The nearest village in Slovakia is Malá Tŕňa.

== History ==
The village was first mentioned in 1440 under the name Kysbanya; at that time, gold and silver were being mined in the area.

Most of its popularity is thanks to its former resident, Ferenc Kazinczy, who renamed the village to Széphalom. Kazinczy bought a property here in 1794, but was imprisoned that same year because of his role in the Jacobin movement. He moved in with his wife in 1806 and lived here until his death in 1831.

The Museum of the Hungarian Language opened on April 23, 2008, on the site of Kazinczy’s former garden.

== Gallery ==
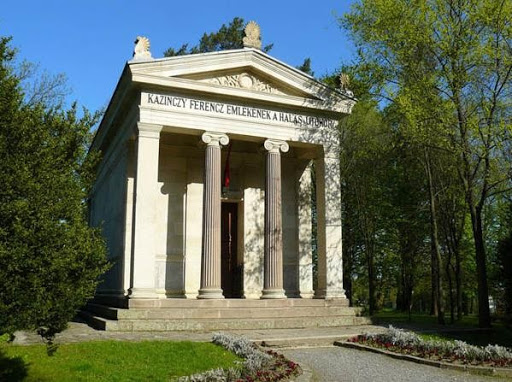
Ferenc Kazinczy Mausoleum

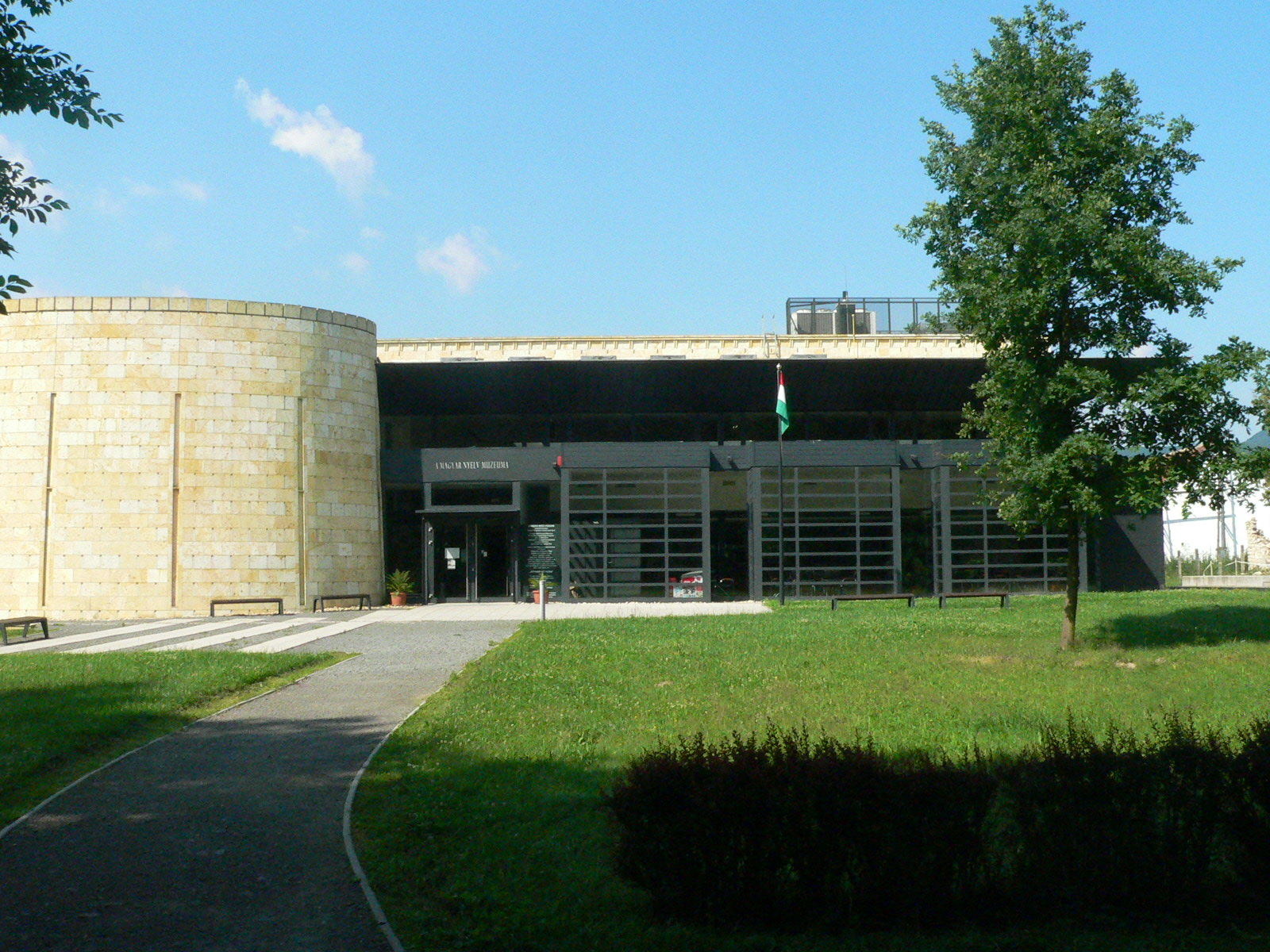
Museum of the Hungarian Language

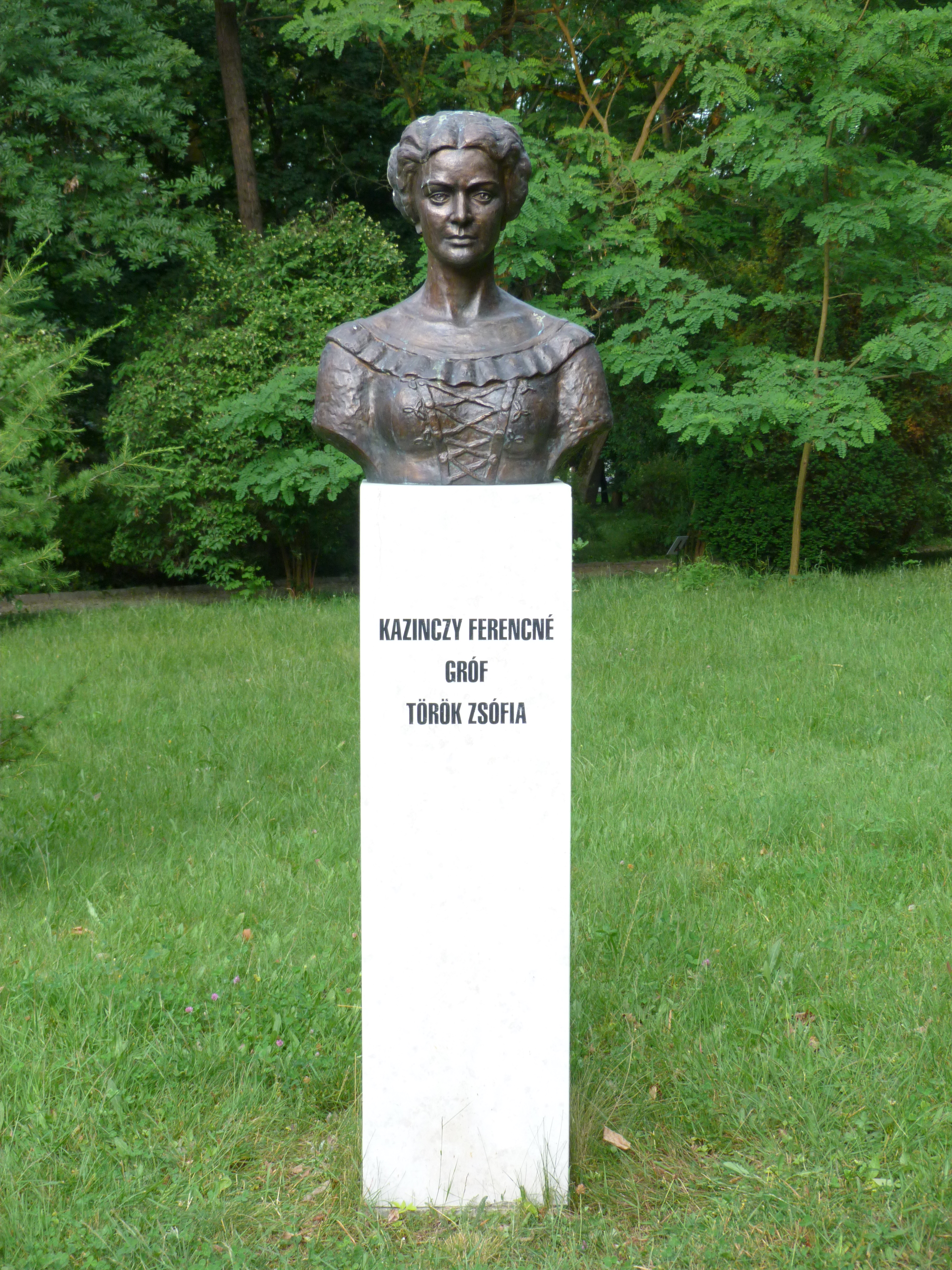
Bust of Sophie Kazinczyné Török

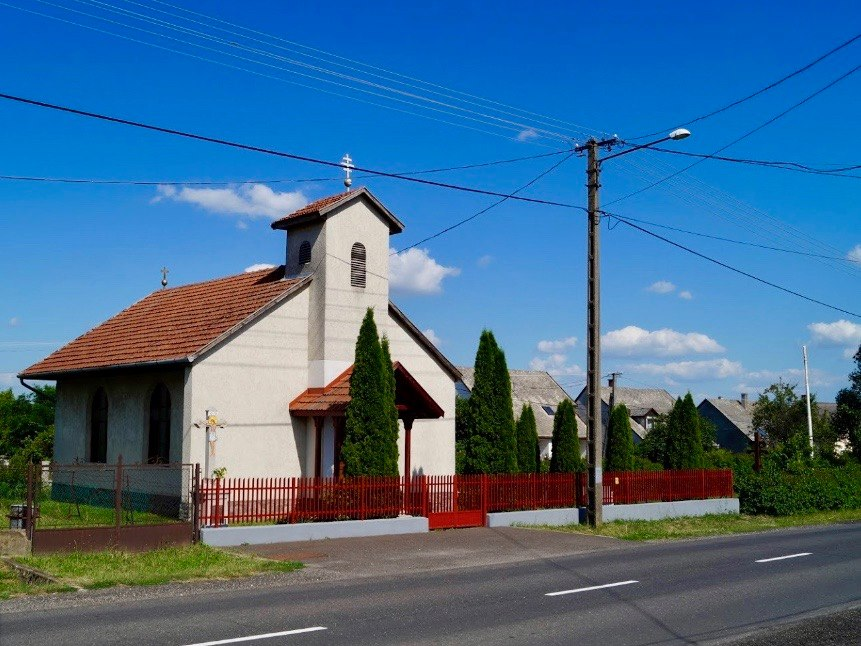
Greek Catholic church
