= Dávid Baróti Szabó =

Hungarian translator, educator, poet

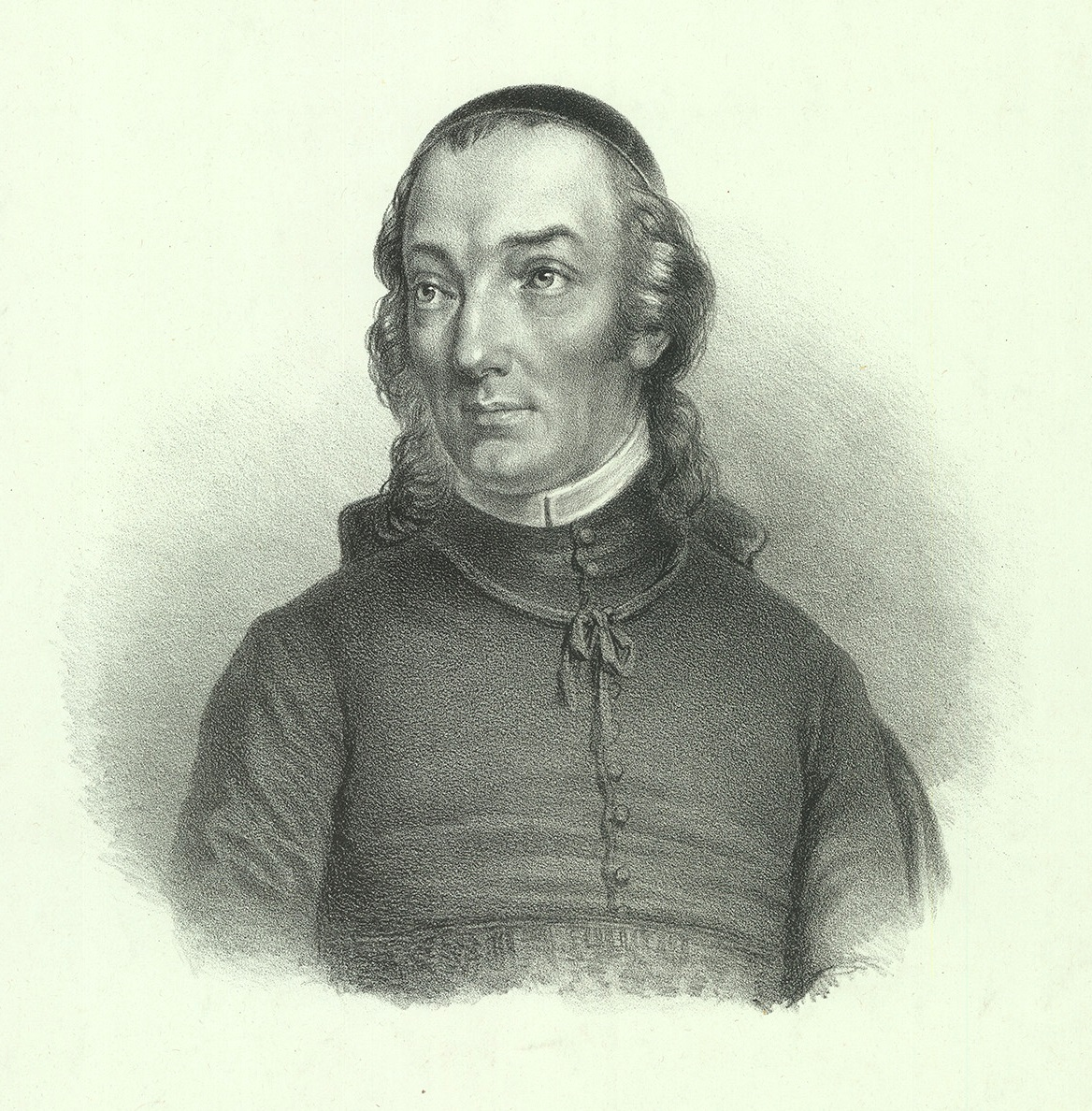
- Dávid Baróti Szabó
- Born: 10 April 1739; Baraolt, Transylvania
- Died: 22 November 1819 (aged 80); Virtj
- Occupations: Jesuit priest, poet, writer, linguist

Dávid Baróti Szabó (10 April 1739 – 22 November 1819) was a Hungarian Jesuit priest, poet, writer and linguist.

== Early life ==
Born into a noble Szekler family from Transylvania, he entered the Jesuit order in 1757 in Székelyudvarhely (today Odorheiu Secuiesc in Romania), then studied and taught in different places in then-Hungary (Trencsén, Szakolca, Székesfehérvár, Nagyszombat, Kolozsvár, Eger) until his ordination as a priest in 1770 in Kassa (now Košice in Slovakia). He was a teacher at Nagyvárad high school (today Oradea in Romania), then finished his spiritual formation ("third year") in Besztercebánya (today Banská Bystrica in Slovakia). After the dissolution of the Jesuit order in 1773, he taught at Komárom, then from 1777 to 1799 at Kassa, and then retired to his former pupil Benedek Pyber, at Virt in the county of Komárom, having obtained from Emperor Francis I a pension of 600 Austrian guilders as a reward for his literary activities.

== Work ==
In Kassa, in 1788 he launched and edited with Ferenc Kazinczy and János Batsányi the first literary periodical published in the Hungarian language, the Magyar Museum.

He was one of the poets of the "national" Hungarian movement of the nobility (nemesi-nemzeti), defending the Hungarian language and customs and praising Hungarian bravery (virtus), without however taking part in the movement of the Hungarian Jacobins of 1794 who opposed the conservative absolutism of Emperor Francis I, as did his younger friends Kazinczy and Batsányi who were arrested and sentenced.

He is also one of those who, at the end of the 18th century, introduced metrical versification into Hungarian poetry, based on the long and short syllables of Hungarian, following the example of Greek and Latin versification. He participates in the movement of revival of the Hungarian language (nyelvújítás), and sought to refresh the poetic language by the use of dialectal words and lexical creations. His poetry is actually less significant and less famous than his role as a pioneer of poetic language and form, which led to the possibilities exploited by early 19th-century poets like Dániel Berzsenyi and Mihály Vörösmarty.

His main works are:

- Új mértékre vett külömb verseknek három könyvei [“Poems separated in new meter, in three books”], Kassa, 1777;
- Ki nyertes az hang-mérséklésbenn? ["Who wins for prosody ?"], Kassa, 1787;
- Baróti Szabó Dávid költeményes munkáji ["Poetic work of Dávid Baróti Szabó"], Kassa, 1789;
- Orthographia és grammatikabéli észrevételek a magyar prozódiával együtt ["Remarks on spelling and grammar, as well as Hungarian prosody"], Komárom, 1800 – two works resulting from the controversy over language and versification (in which he opposes József Rájnis and Miklós Révai);
- Magyarság virágai ["Hungarian flowers"], Komárom, 1803;
- Virgilius Aeneiss ["The Aeneid of Virgil"] — poetic translation in Hungarian, vol. 1: Vienna, 1810, and vol. 2 with Eclogák ["The Eclogues"]: Pest, 1813.
