= Șimian, Bihor =

Șimian Érsemjén
- Commune
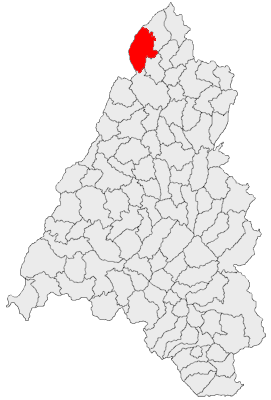
- Location in Bihor County

- Location in Romania
- Coordinates: 47°29′18″N 22°5′15″E
- Country: Romania
- County: Bihor
- Population (2021-12-01): 3,540
- Time zone: EET/EEST (UTC+2/+3)
- Vehicle reg.: BH

Șimian (Hungarian: Érsemjén) is a commune in Bihor County, Crișana, Romania with a population of 3,876 people. It is composed of three villages: Șilindru (Érselénd), Șimian and Voivozi (Érkenéz).

== Natives ==
- Ferenc Kazinczy (1759 – 1831), Hungarian author, poet, neologist
