= Gábor Dayka =

Hungarian poet

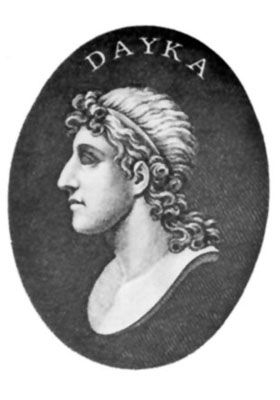
- Born: March 21, 1769; Miskolc, Hungary
- Died: October 20, 1796 (aged 27); Ungvár, Hungary
- Occupation: Poet

Gábor Dayka (March 21, 1769 in Miskolc – October 20, 1796 in Ungvár) was a Hungarian poet.

Ödön Szamovolszky sculpted the statue of Gábor Dayka. From 1909 until October 1944, it stood in front of the Hungarian-language Drugeth High School in Uzhhorod. It was re-erected on 16 April 1994 after decades of adventures.
