= Alsóregmec =

Alsóregmec Nižný Redmec (in Slovak)
- Village
- Flag Coat of arms

- Location of Alsóregmec
- Coordinates: 48.46484°N 21.61713°E
- Country: Hungary
- Region: Northern Hungary
- County: Borsod-Abaúj-Zemplén
- District: Sátoraljaújhely

Area
  - Total: 15.39 km^{2} (5.94 sq mi)

Population (1 January 2025)
  - Total: 194
  - Density: 12.6/km^{2} (32.6/sq mi)
- Time zone: UTC+1 (CET)
  - Summer (DST): UTC+2 (CEST)
- Postal code: 3989
- Area code: (+36) 47
- Website: www.alsoregmec.hu

Alsóregmec (Slovak: Nižný Redmec) is a village in Borsod-Abaúj-Zemplén county, Hungary.

Few Jews lived in the village and there is still a Jewish cemetery there. Many of them were murdered in the Holocaust.

== Notable residents ==
- Ferenc Kazinczy (1759 – 1831), Hungarian author, poet, neologist
