= Archduchess Hermine of Austria =

Archduchess of Austria (1817–1842)

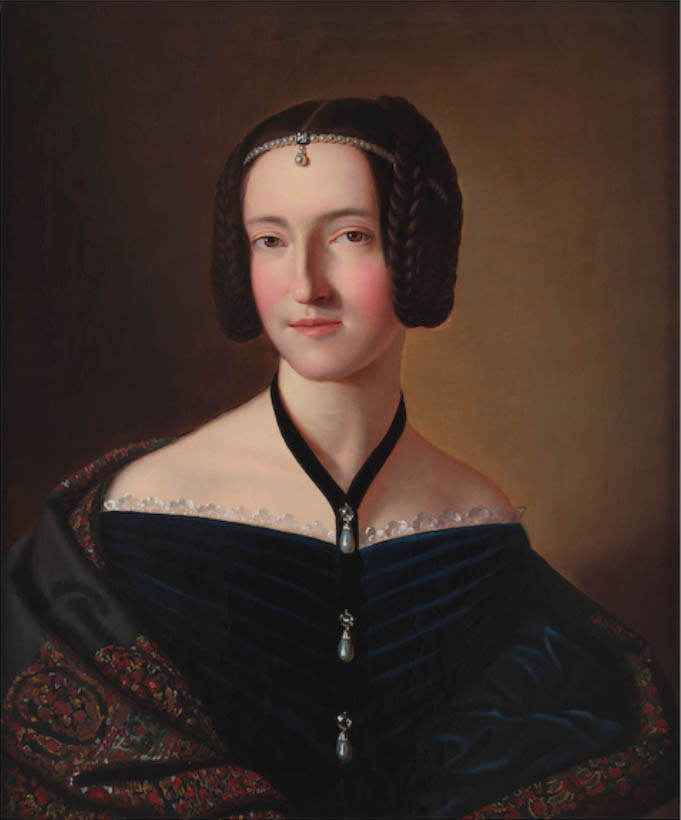
- Portrait, c. 1830s–40s
- Born: 14 September 1817; Buda Castle, Kingdom of Hungary
- Died: 13 February 1842 (aged 24); Vienna, Austrian Empire
Names
- Hermine Amalie Marie
- House: Habsburg-Lorraine
- Father: Archduke Joseph of Austria
- Mother: Princess Hermine of Anhalt-Bernburg-Schaumburg-Hoym

Archduchess Hermine of Austria (Hermine Amalie Marie; 14 September 1817 – 13 February 1842) was by birth member of the House of Habsburg-Lorraine, whose father was the Palatine of Hungary.

== Biography ==
Hermine was the only daughter of Archduke Joseph, Palatine of Hungary by his second wife, Princess Hermine of Anhalt-Bernburg-Schaumburg-Hoym, daughter of Prince Victor II of Anhalt-Bernburg-Schaumburg-Hoym and Princess Amelia of Nassau-Weilburg. Her mother died shortly after giving birth to her and her younger twin brother, Archduke Stephen.

Although the infants had been born one to two months prematurely, both appeared healthy at birth, and were baptised four days later in a solemn ceremony following the death of their mother.

She was brought up by her stepmother, Duchess Maria Dorothea of Württemberg. She spent much of her childhood in Buda and at the family estate in Alcsútdoboz and received an excellent education.

Contemporaries described Archduchess Hermine as comely, kind and modest. However, she was a slim young woman, with frail body, and prone to diseases. She therefore never married.

In 1837 she became Princess-Abbess of the Theresian Royal and Imperial Ladies Chapter of the Castle of Prague (1835–1842).

Hermine died on 13 February 1842 in Vienna, Austria.

== Ancestry ==
Ancestors of Archduchess Hermine of Austria

8. Francis I, Holy Roman Emperor
4. Leopold II, Holy Roman Emperor
9. Maria Theresa of Austria
2. Archduke Joseph, Palatine of Hungary
10. Charles III of Spain
5. Infanta Maria Luisa of Spain
11. Princess Maria Amalia of Saxony
1. Archduchess Hermine of Austria
12. Charles Louis, Prince of Anhalt-Bernburg-Schaumburg-Hoym
6. Victor II, Prince of Anhalt-Bernburg-Schaumburg-Hoym
13. Princess Amalie Eleonore of Solms-Braunfels
3. Princess Hermine of Anhalt-Bernburg-Schaumburg-Hoym
14. Charles Christian, Prince of Nassau-Weilburg
7. Princess Amelia of Nassau-Weilburg
15. Princess Carolina of Orange-Nassau
