= Princess Hermine =

Princess Hermine may refer to:

- Princess Hermine of Anhalt-Bernburg-Schaumburg-Hoym (1797–1817), an Archduchess of Austria through her marriage to Archduke Joseph, Palatine of Hungary
- Hermine Reuss of Greiz (1887–1947), second wife of Wilhelm II, German Emperor
