= Archduke Alexander Leopold of Austria =

Austrian archduke (1772–1795)

Archduke Alexander Leopold
- Royal Prince of Hungary and Bohemia
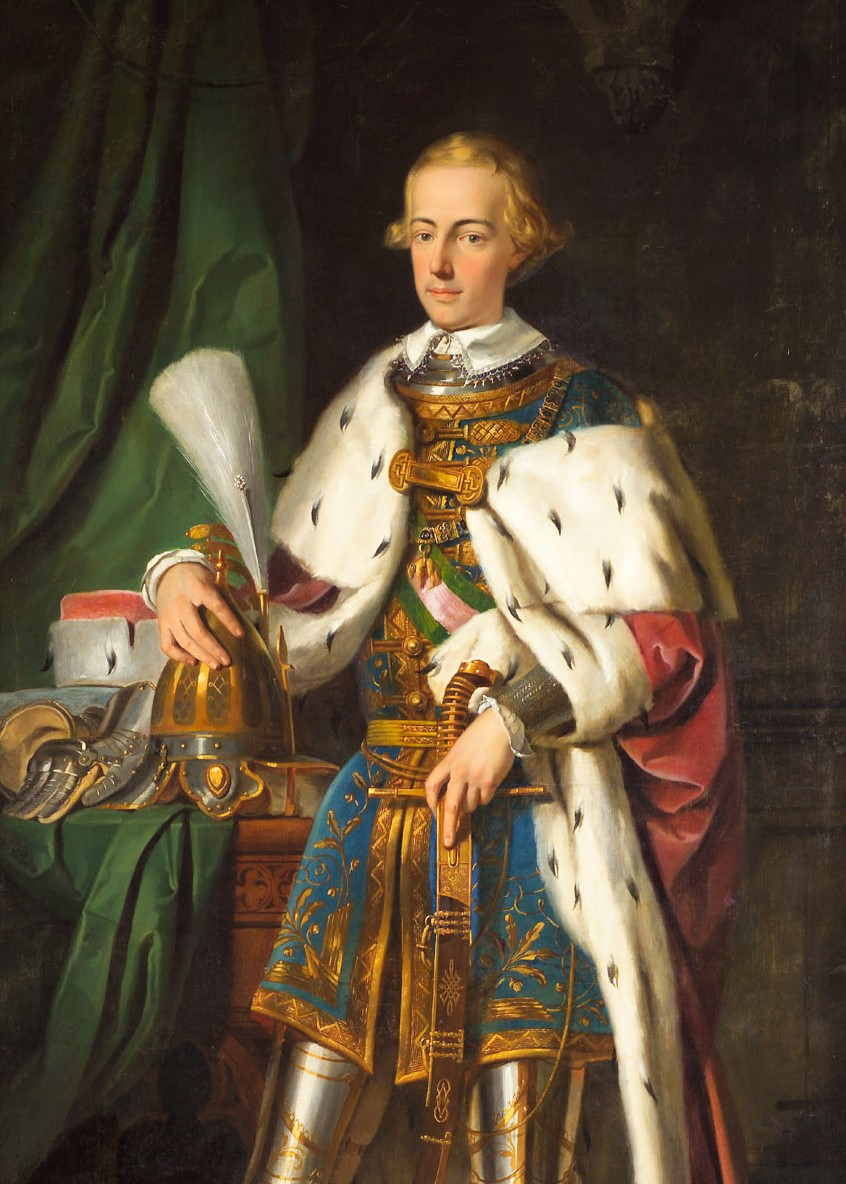
- Portrait by Carl von Sales, 1833

102nd Palatine of the Kingdom of Hungary
- In office 12 November 1790 – 20 September 1795
- Monarchs: Leopold II; Francis I
- Predecessor: Lajos Batthyány
- Successor: Archduke Joseph
- Born: 14 August 1772; Florence, Tuscany
- Died: 12 July 1795 (aged 22)
- Burial: Imperial Crypt, Vienna (body); Herzgruft, Augustinian Church, Vienna (heart)
Names
- Alexander Leopold Johann Josef
- House: Habsburg-Lorraine
- Father: Leopold II, Holy Roman Emperor
- Mother: Maria Luisa of Spain

Archduke Alexander Leopold of Austria (Alexander Leopold Johann Josef; Hungarian: Sándor Lipót; 14 August 1772 – 12 July 1795) was Palatine of Hungary, appointed during the reign of his father, Emperor Leopold II, and serving into the reign of his elder brother, Emperor Francis II.

== Early life ==
Archduke Alexander Leopold was born in Florence, Tuscany, as the sixth child and fourth son of Leopold I, Grand Duke of Tuscany (later Leopold II, Holy Roman Emperor), and Infanta Maria Luisa of Spain. During his education, Alexander Leopold excelled in mathematics and chemistry. He had a fine physique and his father thus wanted him to pursue a military career, with the intent to eventually appoint him president of the Hofkriegsrat.

== Palatine ==
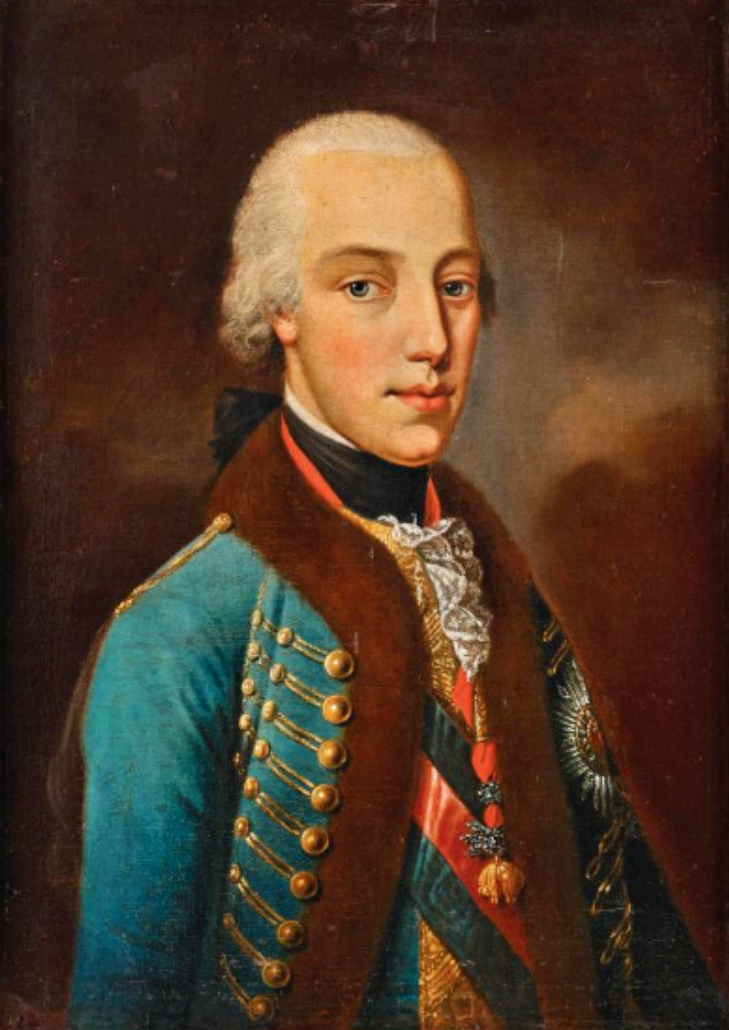
As palatine of Hungary (1795)

In 1790, Grand Duke Leopold succeeded his brother, Joseph II, as Leopold II, Holy Roman Emperor and King of Hungary and Bohemia. Hungary had been ruled by governors since 1765, but the Emperor-King wished to reinstate the office of palatine and allowed the Diet of Hungary to elect a new officeholder. The Diet elected Archduke Alexander Leopold, who thus became the first member of the House of Habsburg-Lorraine to occupy the post. In 1792, his father died; from then on, Alexander Leopold served his elder brother who had succeeded as Holy Roman Emperor Francis II.

As palatine, Archduke Alexander Leopold initially led a moderate government. However, he changed his policy after the Jacobin conspiracy in 1794, which left him deeply disappointed. The object of the plot was to make Hungary independent from the Habsburg monarchy, with Alexander Leopold as its king. He severely punished the rebels and replaced the moderate dignitaries, adopting a policy of repression. The same year, Tadeusz Kościuszko, wishing to secure the neutrality of Austria during an uprising against Imperial Russia and the Kingdom of Prussia, offered the crown of Poland to Archduke Alexander Leopold. The offer was turned down.

== Death ==
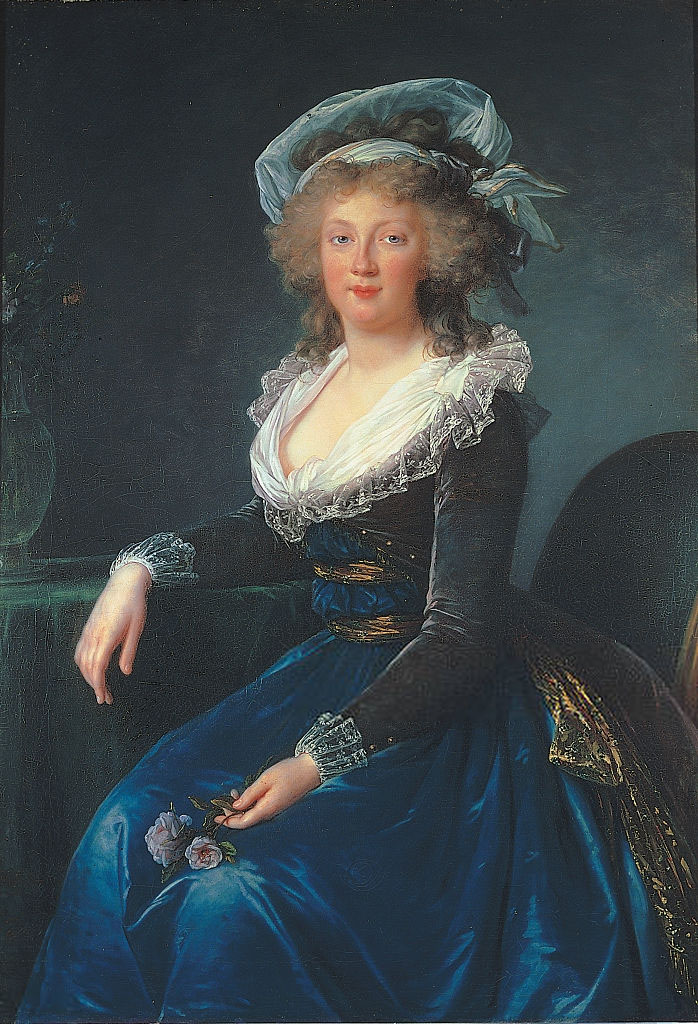
Empress Maria Theresa

Archduke Alexander Leopold, suffering from poor health, left Hungary for Vienna in 1795, after dealing with the conspiracy. His memorandum, written during his stay in Vienna, shows a rather conservative worldview. He argued that differences between classes should not be overcome, especially when it comes to education.

Because of his interest in chemistry and especially in pyrotechnics, Archduke Alexander Leopold decided to prepare a firework display at Laxenburg Palace in order to surprise his sister-in-law and cousin, Maria Theresa of Naples and Sicily. He decided to manufacture and light the fireworks himself in the casemates of the palace, attended by a few of his servants. Empress Maria Theresa was on her way to spend summer at the palace, and when her arrival was announced by a gunshot, Alexander Leopold lit the first rocket. At that moment, the door opened and a draught of air threw the rocket back on the gunpowder. The gunpowder exploded and, unable to escape, Alexander Leopold was burned all over his body. He died immediately, as did his servants.

His body is buried in the Imperial Crypt in Vienna. His heart was buried separately in Herzgruft, Augustinian Church, Vienna. His younger brother, Archduke Joseph, succeeded him as palatine of Hungary.

Archduke Alexander Leopold of Austria House of Habsburg-Lorraine Cadet branch of the House of Lorraine Born: 14 August 1772 Died: 12 July 1795
Political offices
Vacant Title last held by Lajos Batthyány	Palatine of Hungary; 1790–1795	Succeeded by Archduke Joseph
