= Princess Hermine of Anhalt-Bernburg-Schaumburg-Hoym =

Princess Hermine
- Archduchess of Austria; Palatina of Hungary
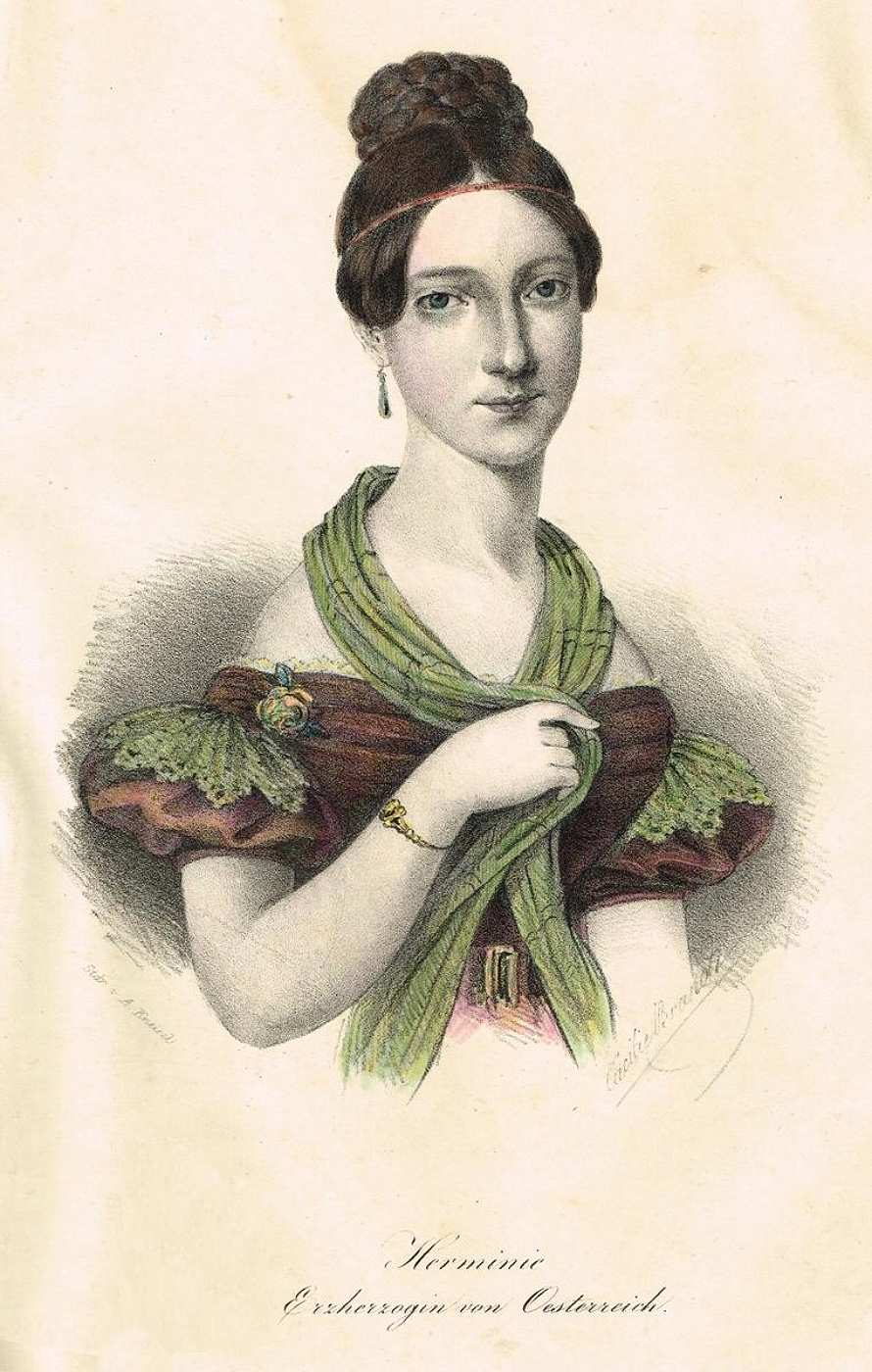
- Born: 2 December 1797; Hoym
- Died: 14 September 1817 (aged 19); Budapest
- Spouse: Archduke Joseph, Palatine of Hungary (m. 1815)
- Issue: Archduchess Hermine Amalie Marie; Archduke Stephen, Palatine of Hungary
Names
- German: Hermine Amalie Marie
- House: Ascania
- Father: Victor II, Prince of Anhalt-Bernburg-Schaumburg-Hoym
- Mother: Amelia of Nassau-Weilburg

Princess Hermine of Anhalt-Bernburg-Schaumburg-Hoym (German: Prinzessin Hermine Amalie Marie von Anhalt-Bernburg-Schaumburg-Hoym; 2 December 1797 – 14 September 1817) was by birth a princess of the House of Ascania and by marriage an Archduchess of Austria.

== Family ==
Born into the Anhalt-Bernburg-Schaumburg-Hoym line of the House of Ascania, she was the eldest daughter of Victor II, Prince of Anhalt-Bernburg-Schaumburg-Hoym and his wife, Princess Amelia of Nassau-Weilburg. Princess Hermine had three younger sisters: Adelheid, Emma, and Ida.

== Marriage ==
She was married on 30 August 1815 at Schaumburg Castle. The princess was just 17 years old when she married the 39-year-old archduke. Archduke Joseph had no male heirs, since his first wife, Grand Duchess Alexandra Pavlovna of Russia, died giving birth to a stillborn daughter.

On 24 August 1819, two years after her death, her husband married for a third time to her first cousin, Duchess Maria Dorothea of Württemberg.

== Issue ==
- Archduchess Hermine Amalie Marie of Austria (14 September 1817 in Budapest – 13 February 1842 in Vienna)
- Archduke Stephen, Palatine of Hungary (14 September 1817 in Budapest – 19 February 1867 in Menton)

== Death ==
Princess Hermine also died in childbirth at the age of 19, after giving birth to fraternal twins. She is buried in the crypt of the Royal Palais in Budapest, Hungary. The details surrounding the Archduchess's death are recorded as follows:

"The reports from Buda (Vienna) filled His Majesty's court and the entire city of Buda with bitter sorrow. According to these sad reports, the beloved Palatine of the Hungarian Republic, the dear life partner of the Emperor's wife, Hermine, died on the night of the 14th of this month, in the terrible pains of a very painful double birth, after which a female child and then a male child were removed from her by the tools of the midwife's profession. On the day following that night, at half past two in the afternoon, she died... K. doctor András Pfiszterer, surgeon, chief obstetrician and midwife Dr. Birly, and midwife Mrs. Schlick appeared immediately upon the approaching signs of childbirth, and according to their great knowledge and extensive experience, they did everything that can be expected from human assistance."

== Ancestry ==
Ancestors of Princess Hermine of Anhalt-Bernburg-Schaumburg-Hoym

8. Victor I, Prince of Anhalt-Bernburg-Schaumburg-Hoym
4. Karl Louis, Prince of Anhalt-Bernburg-Schaumburg-Hoym
9. Charlotte Louise of Isenburg-Büdingen-Birstein
2. Victor II, Prince of Anhalt-Bernburg-Schaumburg-Hoym
10. Frederick William I, Prince of Solms-Braunfels
5. Amalie Eleonore of Solm-Braunfels
11. Sophie of Solms-Laubach
1. Hermine of Anhalt-Bernburg-Schaumburg-Hoym
12. Charles August, Prince of Nassau-Weilburg
6. Charles Christian, Prince of Nassau-Weilburg
13. Auguste Friederike of Nassau-Idstein
3. Amelia of Nassau-Weilburg
14. William IV, Prince of Orange
7. Carolina of Orange-Nassau
15. Anne of Great Britain
