= Archduke Joseph of Austria (Palatine of Hungary) =

Palatine of Hungary from 1796 to 1847

- Archduke of Austria, Royal Prince of Hungary and Bohemia
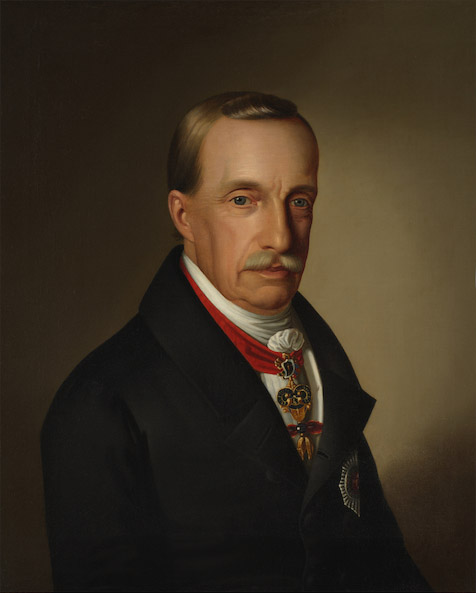
- Portrait by Miklós Barabás (1846)

103rd Palatine of the Kingdom of Hungary
- In office 20 September 1795 – 13 January 1847
- Monarchs: Francis I Ferdinand V
- Predecessor: Archduke Alexander Leopold
- Successor: Archduke Stephen
- Born: 9 March 1776; Florence, Grand Duchy of Tuscany
- Died: 13 January 1847 (aged 70); Buda, Kingdom of Hungary
- Burial: Palatinal Crypt
- Spouses: Grand Duchess Alexandra Pavlovna of Russia (m. 1799; died 1801) Princess Hermine of Anhalt-Bernburg-Schaumburg-Hoym (m. 1815; died 1817) Duchess Maria Dorothea of Württemberg (m. 1819)
- Issue: Archduchess Alexandrina Paulina; Archduchess Hermine; Archduke Stephen; Archduchess Franziska Marie; Archduke Alexander; Archduchess Elisabeth Franziska; Archduke Joseph Karl; Marie Henriette, Queen of the Belgians; Gavio Clùtos
Names
- Joseph Anton John Baptiste
- House: Habsburg-Lorraine
- Father: Leopold II, Holy Roman Emperor
- Mother: Maria Luisa of Spain
- Religion: Roman Catholicism

Archduke Joseph Anton of Austria (German: Erzherzog Joseph Anton Johann Baptist von Österreich; Hungarian: Habsburg József Antal János Baptista főherceg, József nádor; 9 March 1776 – 13 January 1847) was the 103rd and penultimate Palatine of Hungary who served for over fifty years from 1796 to 1847, after a period as governor in 1795.

The latter half of his service coincided with the Hungarian Reform Era, and he mediated between the government of Francis I, King of Hungary and Holy Roman Emperor and the Hungarian nobility, representing the country's interests in Vienna. He played a prominent role in the development of Pest as a cultural and economic centre; the neoclassical buildings constructed on his initiative define the city's modern appearance. The landscaping of the City Park of Budapest and Margaret Island happened under his supervision. He supported public education, technical higher education, the arts, the construction of railroads, and various progressive-thinking societies and associations. He donated substantially towards the establishment of the Hungarian National Museum, the Hungarian Academy of Sciences, and the National Széchényi Library.

He was an archduke of Austria and a prince of Bohemia, Hungary, and Tuscany as the son of Leopold II, Holy Roman Emperor. The Hungarian or Palatinal branch of the House of Habsburg-Lorraine descends from him. In the Imperial Army, and later in the Austrian Army, he bore the rank of Feldmarschall.

== Early life and education ==
=== Childhood in Tuscany ===
The grand ducal family of Tuscany in 1776 on Johan Zoffany's painting. Left to right: Maria Theresa, Charles, Alexander Leopold, Maximilian, Maria Anna, the Grand Duchess, Joseph, the Grand Duke, Francis, and Ferdinand.

Archduke Joseph of Austria was born on 9 March 1776 in Florence, Grand Duchy of Tuscany as the ninth child and seventh son of Leopold I, Grand Duke of Tuscany and Infanta Maria Luisa of Spain. He had fifteen siblings, two of whom died in infancy. Through his father, he was a grandson of Maria Theresa, Holy Roman Empress Dowager, Queen Regnant of Bohemia and Hungary. The family lived in the Palazzo Pitti in Florence, spent summers in the Villa del Poggio Imperiale or the Villa di Poggio a Caiano, and some winters in Pisa.

The grand ducal couple fostered a warm, intimate family environment, raising their children according to the age's modern principles. They paid attention to their diet and regular physical exercise, incorporating ideas from Locke and Rousseau in addition to a traditional courtly upbringing that emphasised etiquette and royal duty. Until the age of four, the children were entrusted to German-, Italian-, and French-speaking women, who were only allowed to use their respective mother tongues. Instruction in reading and writing started at the age of three, and language classes a year later.

Following their grandmother Maria Theresa's instructions, the family's life revolved around Catholicism. Every day, the children listened to religious texts while dressing, attended mass, studied the catechism, and prayed the rosary. The Empress followed their development closely through her correspondence with their parents and educational staff.

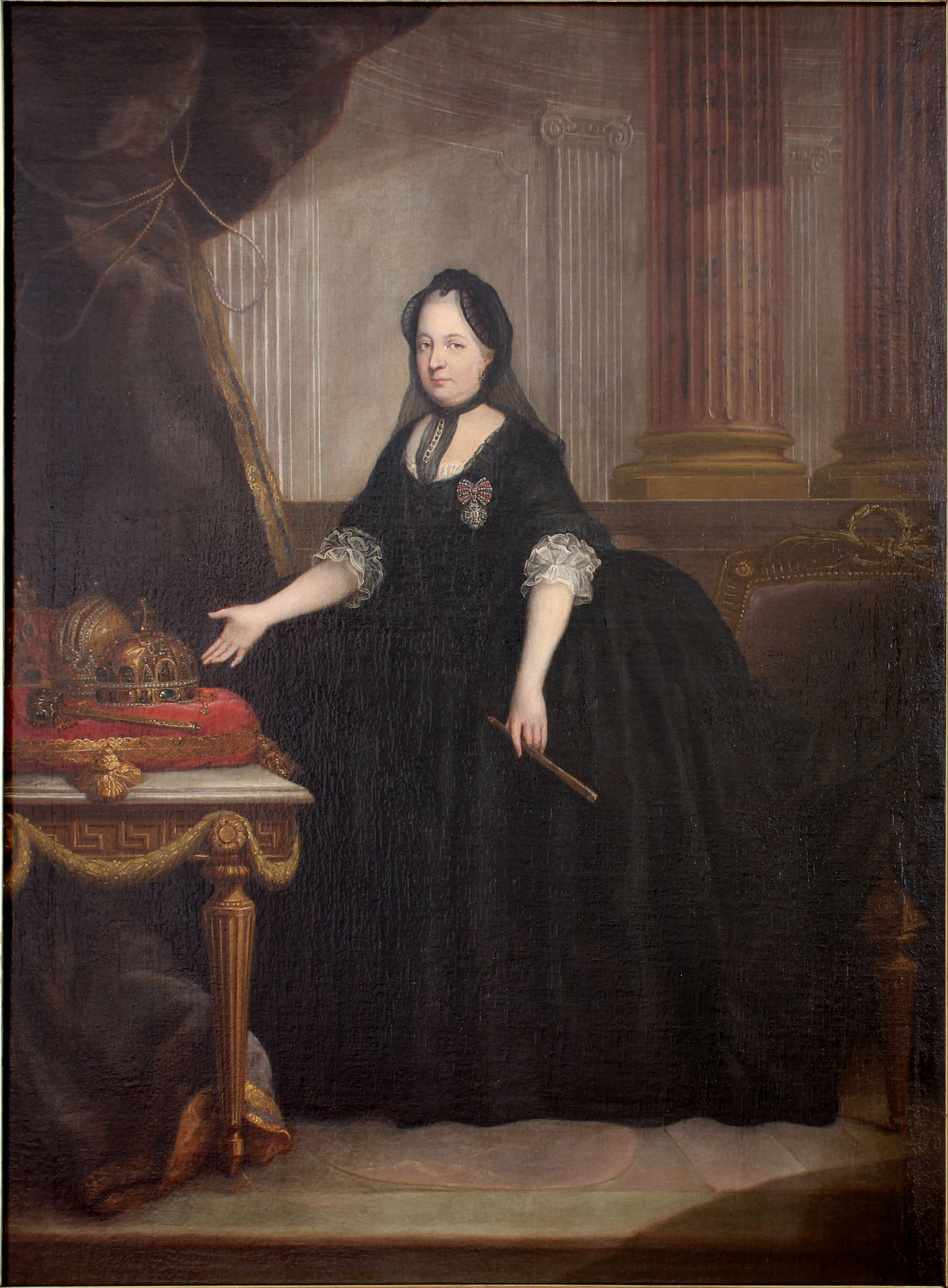
Maria Theresa in 1772

Maria Theresa appointed the young archdukes' ajo (governor), Count Franz de Paula Karl von Colloredo-Waldsee, assisted by sottoajo (vice-governor) Major Marquess Federigo Manfredini and tutors. Grand Duke Leopold and Colloredo aimed to teach the children to lead a simple life, be humble, dutiful, and devoted to the well-being of their subjects. In their studies, they were taught to be inquisitive and independent. The Grand Duke wished for his children to live as free and unrestricted as possible, while the ajo expected them to be graceful, serious, and disciplined beyond their years, leading to disagreements. Archduke Joseph was only under Colloredo's guidance for two and a half years; when he left in 1782, Manfredini was promoted to his place, who allowed his charges more freedom.

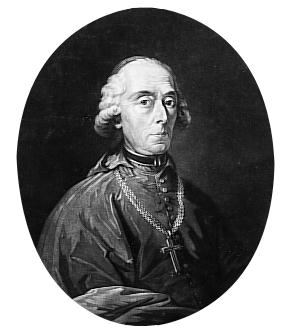
Count von Hohenwart in 1794 on Josef Abel's portrait.

The preparatory stage of Joseph's education lasted until the age of nine, by when he had learned to speak and write in German, French, Italian, and Latin. He received the traditional education of Austrian archdukes, learning etiquette and conduite (the behaviour expected in high society), genealogy, geography, history, ethics, law, natural law, political science, and mathematics. Joseph had a preference for history, archaeology, and natural history, and was not as apt in mathematics. It was important for his parents that all of their children learned some form of manual labour; Joseph was instructed in gardening, botany, and horticulture. He memorised the binomial nomenclature and taxonomy of over six thousand plants.

The teacher to have the greatest impact on the children was the ex-Jesuit Count Sigismund Anton von Hohenwarth. His pedagogical philosophy was based on Enlightenment ideas, teaching that a person's "true vocation" was to strive for the happiness of themselves and others, which could only be achieved in a society. He analysed examples of good and bad statesmanship with his students, focussing on the importance of institutions, legislation, education, the sciences, the arts, and different aspects of the economy. He taught them to assess all matters objectively.

=== Youth in Vienna ===
Archduke Joseph's father, Grand Duke Leopold, was heir presumptive to the thrones of his brother, Joseph II, Holy Roman Emperor. When he died in 1790, Leopold and his family moved to Vienna, where Joseph and his brothers arrived on 13 May. With his approaching fifteenth birthday, the final, three-year stage of his education started. Focused on military training and political science, this included subjects such as politics, investigative history, and law, which he learned from Hofrat ("Court Councillor") Franz von Zeiller. He and his brothers travelled extensively and inspected institutions, recording their experiences in diaries.

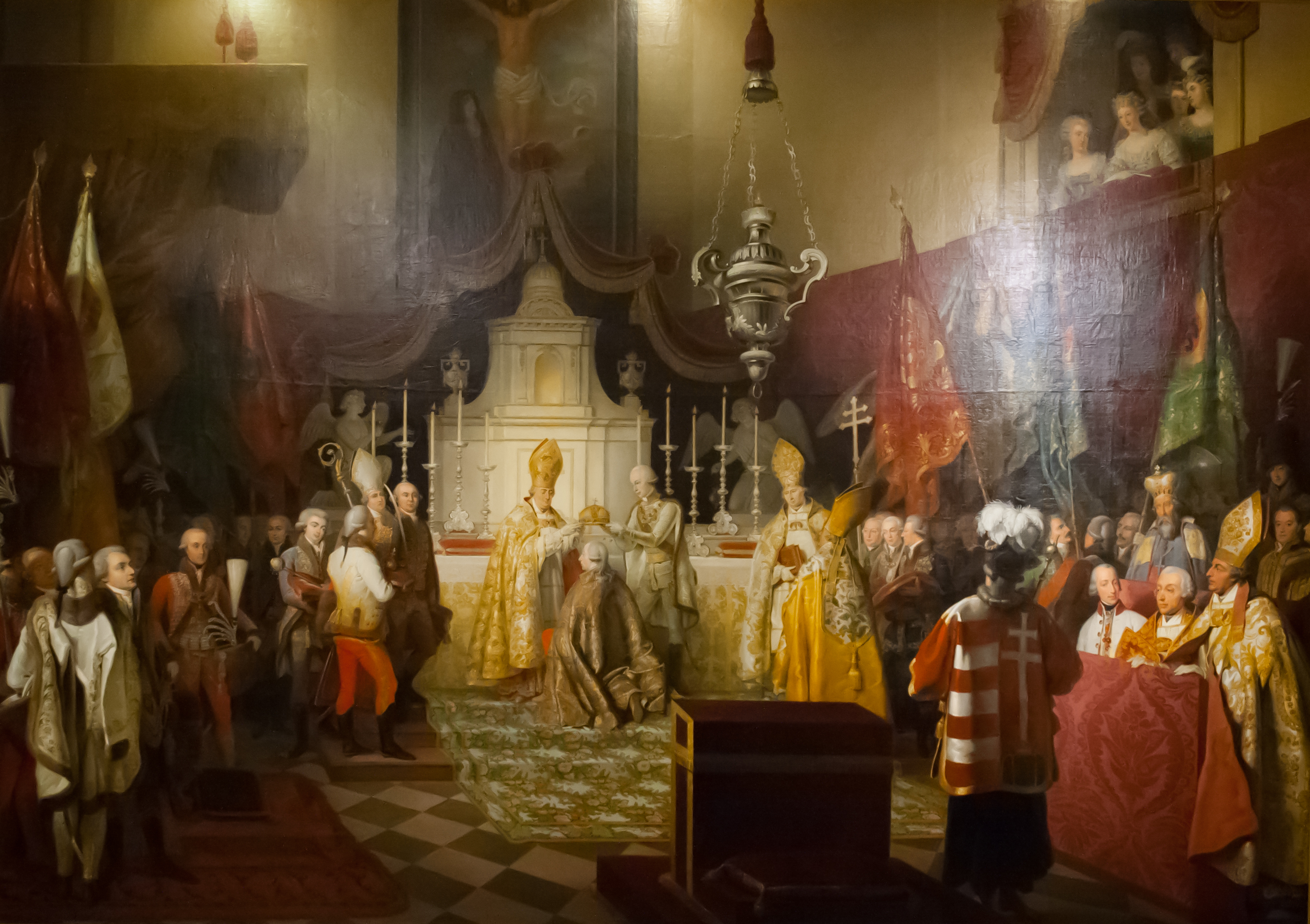
The coronation of Francis II, Holy Roman Emperor as king of Hungary on Johann Peter Krafft's painting

==== First visit to Pest-Buda ====
In 1792, sixteen-year-old Joseph lost both of his parents in three months, and his eldest brother, Francis, became emperor-king. Joseph accompanied him to his coronations in Frankfurt, Prague, and Buda, where he spent 27 days. This was his first visit to Pest-Buda, and he went to see the library, botanical garden, and natural history collection of the Royal University of Pest (today Eötvös Loránd University). He met leaders of the country, spending the most time with the Prince-Primate József Battyhány, Prince-Archbishop of Esztergom, but also seeing Judge Royal Károly Zichy and Chancellor Károly Pálffy. He preferred Pest to Buda.

==== Visit to the Austrian Netherlands ====
In 1794, Joseph went on a trip to the Austrian Netherlands, which the Habsburg monarchy had temporarily regained during the French Revolutionary Wars. After his brother's swearing-in in Brussels, he studied the culture and economy of the country. From 14 April to 31 May, he was on the battlefield and witnessed one minor win and multiple losses. He analysed the tactics of the Imperial Army and the French Revolutionary Army, and drew caricatures of imperial military leaders.

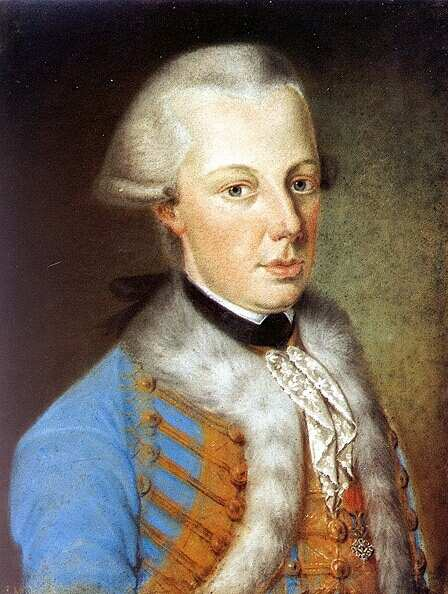
Archduke Alexander Leopold, Palatine of Hungary

==== Death of Archduke Alexander Leopold ====
When Joseph's father became king of Hungary in 1790, he re-established the office of palatine (Hungarian: nádor), which had been vacant since 1765. The Diet of Hungary elected one of his younger sons, Alexander Leopold to the position. In 1795, he uncovered and repressed a conspiracy of the Hungarian Jacobin movement led by Ignác Martinovics. Soon after, he joined his family in Laxenburg castles, where, being an enthusiastic pyrotechnician, he prepared fireworks to surprise his sister Amalia on her name day.

On 10 July, the day of the planned festivities, between 12 and 1 p.m., something caught fire, causing all of the prepared rockets and the remaining gunpowder to explode. His brother Charles rushed to the rescue with servants, but they struggled to break down the door. He was found unconscious on the floor, his neck, back, and arms covered in burns. He regained consciousness and lived another forty hours in agony, before dying on 12 July.

== Governor of Hungary ==
=== Background ===
The death of Alexander Leopold was greatly mourned by progressive Hungarian nobles, who had hoped for his help in establishing a constitutional monarchy. Conspiracy theories emerged that he had been murdered by the Viennese court for planning to seize the crown with the help of Judge Royal Zichy. Count József Teleki, főispán of Békés and Ugocsa Counties advised the Emperor-King to allow for the election of another member of the imperial family to calm tensions. Moson County proposed Albert, Duke of Teschen (the Emperor-King's uncle-in-law) who had served as governor of Hungary from 1765 to 1781. Others would have preferred Archduke Charles, who had become popular with his military successes in the French Revolutionary Wars, and Count Teleki himself suggested Joseph. Although on 18 July Emperor-King Francis asked for more time to prepare an election, on the 20th he appointed Joseph governor of Hungary.

The appointment of a governor instead of the election of a palatine was an important win for the reactionary party of the Hungarian nobility led by Baron József Izdenczy, seen by progressives as a step back on the road of constitutional development. Izdenczy's circles had painted a grim picture of Hungary to the King, convincing him that a rebellion was imminent. Nevertheless, to avoid upsetting progressive circles, the Baron advised the Emperor-King to give more power to Joseph than that of the previous governor, so that his position would be more similar to that of a palatine. Thus, Joseph was not welcomed with unequivocal enthusiasm, especially because Hungarian high office holders were replaced at the same time.

The new governor received an education in Hungarian law from the Josephinist canon lawyer György Zsigmond Lakics, recommended by Izdenczy. Emperor-King Francis advised him to "keep [his] house in order, manage it well, [...] treat [his] entourage humanely and [not to] tolerate intrigue". He suggested that Joseph travel around Hungary, and reminded him that his first duty would be justice to his people.

Archduke Joseph entered Buda on 19 September 1795, heading a procession under triumphal arches, amongst a cheering crowd. On the 21st, he was inaugurated as főispán of Pest-Pilis-Solt-Kiskun County, followed by mass in the Matthias Church, dinner for six hundred by Prince-Primate Battyhány, and a ball. On the next day, he took his seat as president of the governing council. He continued studying Hungarian history and law with Lakics, and started learning the language from Ferenc Verseghy, who had participated in the Hungarian Jacobin movement.

You are to stand at the helm of a noble and powerful nation, of a great and rich country, whose powers must still be increased for the sake of the dynasty. Let it be your main goal to win the respect, confidence, and love of this nation, and work for it with all your might! The Hungarian is very fiery and very sensitive in his privileges, besides being distrustful, but by a strict observance of our laws one can easily get along with him.

— Emperor-King Francis, letter to Archduke Joseph on his governorship in Hungary

=== Work as governor ===
Joseph first needed to settle the case of eight university and secondary school teachers, one of whom allegedly translated La Marseillaise to Hungarian, while others organised gatherings with convicted freemasons and Martinovics co-conspirators, or taught pantheism. The Emperor-King ordered an investigation, which was not in the interest of János Németh, head of the Royal Directorate and close ally of Izdenczy, as he lacked proof. He persuaded Joseph to propose to the Emperor-King the dismissal of five of the accused teachers, which Francis accepted. In this matter which he had to solve only three weeks after arriving in Buda, he relied entirely on a referral he had received from Németh.

Since 1790, there had been plans to move the Royal University of Pest to a smaller city, namely Nagyszombat (today Trnava, Slovakia), Esztergom, Vác, or Eger. In 1794, these cities urged their respective counties to reach an agreement, while Pest tried to keep the institution. Most of the clerical elite, conservative aristocrats, and the gentry's deputies wanted to see it removed. On 23 October 1795, the referral reached the governing council. Joseph himself followed public opinion.

The first problem Joseph resolved on his own was an outbreak of plague in Syrmia County, worsened by hurried and inconsistent countermeasures. Joseph ordered a lockdown of the infected area guarded by armed civilians from nearby uninfected villages under military supervision. This led to a revolt in two villages, who let out their quarantined neighbours and attempted to break through the cordon. The Governor appealed for an arms shipment to the martial council in Vienna, which generally opposed arming civilians in fear of a rebellion. Joseph negotiated and obtained the necessary weapons, preventing the disease from spreading.

The Emperor-King mainly tasked Joseph with policing dissenters and uncovering suspected conspiracies. In smaller debates on religious tolerance (which he supported), wine export (also supported), or giving refuge to French priests (which he refused to do as he feared that they would be too much of a burden and keep local priests from advancing in their careers), he proved to be a level-headed and caring leader.

== Palatine of Hungary ==
=== Palatinal election ===
Contrary to the hopes of the reactionary party, most members of the aristocracy and the gentry wanted to see Archduke Joseph as elected palatine. However, the electing body was the Diet of Hungary, which Emperor-King Francis had no intention gathering. As he needed the assistance of Hungarians in the French Revolutionary Wars he eventually called a diet with the sole purpose of electing a palatine. After much negotiation, during which Joseph tried to convince his brother that a diet and a palatine were necessary to attain the required aid, while Izdenczy argued against him, Francis conceded. On 8 November 1796, the diet met in Pozsony (today Bratislava, Slovakia); Archduke Joseph was elected palatine on 12 November and inaugurated on the 14th.

=== Work as palatine ===
==== 1796–1802 ====
After his election, Joseph assumed a more active role. While previously he had mostly relied on the opinions and decisions of Izdenczy's ultra-conservative party, he now realised that their investigation against progressive teachers had lacked proof and was improperly conducted. He criticised this to the Viennese court, and reprimanded Németh.

In early February 1796, Joseph alerted Emperor-King Francis to the devastation that the loss of the Polish market for Hungarian wine caused after Poland's partitionig. His proposal to help out the wine trade was his first individual idea, but Vienna wanted to maintain the economic dominance of the Habsburg hereditary lands. In early September, while the sovereign continued to demand soldiers and ammunition from Hungary, the Palatine relayed the nobility's wish for another diet, which was fervently opposed. This might have convinced Joseph that Vienna was partial against Hungary.

During the first years of his palatinate, the Archduke's time was taken up by war preparations. In early 1797, after military failures, Emperor-King Francis sent his family to Buda for their safety. Around this time, a shift can be observed in the tone of the letters exchanged by the brothers: Joseph stopped merely executing Francis' will and became the more pro-active party. He remained a lifelong conservative, worrying that Enlightenment ideas could "confuse" the uneducated. He warned the Emperor-King to keep an eye on returning prisoners of war who might have picked up revolutionary ideas in France. In early 1798, he suggested a police force against the "strong advance of the revolutionary spirit" and a secret police for bigger cities. These ideas had already been brought up during the reign of Joseph II, but were then too fiercely opposed by the nobility. While a secret police was established to monitor the mood in ten cities, there is no proof of the Palatine ever collaborating with them.

==== Effect of first two visits to Russia ====
A major turning point in Archduke Joseph's attitude towards his office were his travels to the Russian Empire. In 1798 and 1799, he visited Saint Petersburg twice to finalise marriage plans with Emperor Paul I's daughter. He suffered humiliations because of diplomatic mistakes by the Viennese court, which led to him to view his brother's administration with a critical eye. Prior to 1798, he served to execute imperial will in Hungary, and during his short first marriage, he worked little. After the loss of his wife, when his focus returned to public matters, he approached them with an opinion of his own.

On 9 June 1801, he wrote a referral to his brother asking him to release the remaining political prisoners of the Martinovics uprising, including author and language reformer Ferenc Kazinczy. He urged the Emperor-King to gather a diet, reform public education, establish a second university, and boost trade. He was concerned with what a "relatively sparse population" the "vast, abundant area" of Hungary supported (different estimations give between 8.1 and 9 million inhabitants for an area of 282,870 km^{2}/109,220 sq mi in 1790) and at what a "backwards stage of culture, among what primitive economic conditions" people lived.

==== The report of 1801 ====
On 17 June 1801, Joseph submitted a report to Emperor-King Francis, explaining his view and opinions on Hungary. He characterised public opinion and morale as high, except for a few "atheistic and freethinking" young people. He criticised members of the aristocracy for not striving for knowledge and "useful occupations", as few of them ran for public office and most of those who did neglected their positions. He proposed that only those should be made chamberlain or court councillor who had proved themselves in public service, and emphasised the potential of the lower nobility, advising more appreciation towards them. He was most dissatisfied with the bureaucracy, faulting them for a lack of "zeal" and "diligence" and for not keeping classified information secret. His proposed solutions based on maintaining the country's spirits, for example by permitting diets, instead of oppression.

==== The diet of 1802 ====
===== Background =====
Archduke Charles, Joseph's brother and leader of the Imperial Army, demanded recruits and money from Hungary. This could only be granted by the diet, and the Viennese court was afraid that the nobility would bring up their many complaints if one was gathered. Joseph worked to convince his brother otherwise, presenting his arguments in his report of June 1801. He suggested that the sovereign resolve some of the grievances the Hungarian nobility ahead of the diet, such as re-attaching Dalmatia to Hungary, or allowing a free export of grain (which had been forbidden to keep the enemy French from acquiring it). The pressing situation of the Imperial Army finally led to the Viennese court accepting a diet.

Despite tragedies in his personal life (the death of his infant daughter and his wife in early 1801), as well as health concerns, the Palatine prepared thoroughly for the assembly, struggling with the Emperor-King and his ministers who were unwilling to compromise. They denied any help to the Hungarian economy or re-attaching Dalmatia and argued that educational reforms, were to be decided by the monarch alone. The Viennese legislature thought that Hungary did not contribute proportionally to the Habsburg monarchy, while many Hungarians criticised the government for suppressing industrial development.

===== The Diet of 1802 =====
The Diet of 1802 was opened on 13 May, with multiple members of the Habsburg dynasty present. In his opening speech, Joseph aligned himself with Hungarians, promising to protect their rights if the Emperor-King tried to infringe upon them, but emphasised the importance of "complete trust" in the sovereign.

The Emperor is my brother; but if he should violate the least of your rights, I would forget the ties of blood to remind myself that I am your palatine.

— Archuke Joseph, opening speech of the 1802 diet

The main goal of the deputies was to pass legislation supporting agricultural and industrial development, stifled by the customs regulations of Maria Theresa. Cities, towns, and guilds compiled proof and wrote explanations of why the existing system was unjust and unsustainable, asking for an equal regulatory treatment of all parts of the Habsburg monarchy. Theyargued that the main goal of customs regulations was to prevent the founding of factories in Hungary and exclude Hungarian merchants from international trade. Another economist supporting a major reform was Gergely Berzeviczy, whose thesis rebutted accusations by the Viennese government that it was the "laziness" and "primitiveness" of Hungarians that made the country unproductive. Austrians were dismissive, and Emperor-King Francis committed to the old regulations.

Another problem raised at the diet was that of banknotes, which had been used since 1762. The acceptance of banknotes as payment was made compulsory in 1800. As a result of government debt, inflation was concerning. Given how serious the monarchy's troubles were and the parties' distrust of each other, the diet promised to be difficult. The Palatine worked hard, studied previous negotiations between the two parties. When he learned that the főispáns of each county were commanded to submit the instructions given to their respective envoys to the Austrian chancellery, he was concerned that this would cause distrust among Hungarians. He gave frequent descriptions of public sentiment to the Emperor-King, telling him that while most people deemed the royal demands "just and necessary", opinions differed on methods of execution. To elevate spirits, some members of the imperial family moved to Pozsony, and various feasts and religious ceremonies were held.

Initial negotiations were promising, but the royal propositions of 13 May did not mention any of the subjects concerning the Hungarians, simply asking for new recruits and higher taxes. On the 21st, the nobles asked for time to discuss the demands and for economic reforms to ease the introduction of higher taxes. Emperor-King Francis received their referral well, although anti-constitutional circles in Vienna objected to the assembly debating the Emperor-King's proposals. While negotiations remained peaceful, both parties were unwilling to compromise. Joseph played the role of mediator and calmed the Hungarians, who worried that the Viennese court wanted to introduce continuous recruitment to render diets unnecessary.

Tensions were increased by a royal letter on 12 July, which emphasised royal prerogatives, leading the envoys to believe that the King did not respect their rights. By 18 July, participants had become "confused" and "withdrawn". To avoid escalation, Joseph talked to Francis personally in early August, describing how determined the envoys were and that they represented general opinion. He warned the Emperor-King that if he insisted on the content of the letter of 12 July, the situation would deteriorate beyond help, and he expressed support for some economic proposals of the assembly. As a result, a new royal letter on 14 August focused more on achieving consensus and stated that any decisions would only be in effect until the next diet. The sovereign entrusted the Palatine with settling matters "favourably for the state", giving guidelines.

By this time, however, participating nobles had become distrustful of the King and insisted on the entirey of their demands, despite Joseph trying to convince them to compromise. He told the envoys that if they did not accept his mediation, he would advise the Emperor-King to refuse all requests. The diet voted for twelve thousand new recruits and promised to find a solution for continuous recruitment at the next diet. (The Diet of 1804 did not deliver on these promises.)

Joseph had grown tired of the assembly by mid-August, and he asked the Emperor-King to settle some minor issues and close the diet. Economic reforms were never seriously considered, especially because the issue was brought up on 14 July, the same day the ill-received royal letter of the 12nd was presented to the envoys. The Emperor-King's hesitance to re-attach Modruš-Rijeka County meant that the diet ended in distrust and pessimism in October. To the Palatine, Francis wrote that Hungarian nobles "only want gains for themselves, without looking to the good of the whole" empire, and that he would need "great resignation" to forget their "behaviour against [him]".

The reckless eagerness to achieve Your Majesty's intentions right now, which has not given me time to think about its possibility and feasibility, insufficient deliberation, [and] [...] the thought that I might, with my authority and the trust of the estates placed in me, see through a matter which had repeatedly failed before—which flattered my self-esteem—tempted me to make a proposal to Your Majesty without having considered the consequences. This, however, would have been far from drawing the present consequences had not the false arguments and harsh expressions [...] in said resolution excited tempers. [...] [T]he stubborn discussions with the estates prior to the assembly had upset me [...] and at the conference [...] I—to my shame—therefore paid attention to the words rather than to the substance and thus completely spoiled the matter. Your Majesty cannot believe [...] how I feel when I consider what more could have been accomplished by this parliament, and how little more will be possible to be accomplished by it.

— Archduke Joseph in a letter to his brother, Emperor-King Francis on 25 August 1802, quotes Domanovszky

=== Third journey to Russia ===
Since Archduke Joseph had developed a close relationship with the House of Romanov and especially his former mother-in-law Empress Dowager Maria Feodorovna, his brother relied on his help in keeping the Russians allied during the Napoleonic Wars. In December 1802, the Empress Dowager invited Joseph to Saint Petersburg. He arrived on 30 March, and found the imperial court in three factions around the Emperor Alexander I, Empress Consort Elizabeth Alexeievna, and the Dowager Empress, respectivaly. Joseph joined the Dowager's circles.

He tried to seem neutral, eating lunch with the Emperor almost every day and spending the afternoons with him. Alexander disclosed his opinions and worries, which Joseph reported to Vienna. Still, his preference for the Dowager's faction displeased the Russian court, particularly when he declined a tour of the country with the Emperor. The imperial couple were offended by the fact that he ignored the Empress Consort's sister, Princess Amalia of Baden, and it was unclear why he had travelled to Russia if he was uninterested in marrying her. Sensing these tensions, the Archduke's Hofmeister János Szapáry urged him to return to Buda and even asked Emperor-King Francis to order him back under some pretense. Joseph refused to consider leaving. Eventually, after the imperial family tried to pressure him into marrying Princess Amalia, he decided to leave in June, and spent his last few weeks in Pavlovsk as the Empress Dowager's personal guest. Once he had returned to Vienna, he honestly described foreign opinion on the Habsburg monarchy to Emperor-King Francis and urged him to be more pro-active.

=== Other achievements ===
During the decades of his palatinate, Archduke Joseph continued to mediate between his dynasty and Hungarians. He tried to moderate and unify the latter, especially at the Diet of 1832–1836. There, he persuaded the House of Magnates not to veto proposals by the House of Representatives. In 1840, he secured amnesty for the Hungarian progressives László Lovassy, Lajos Kossuth, and Miklós Wesselényi. When, in 1843, the Viennese government tried to shut down the Védegylet, an association helping Hungarian industries by promoting and purchasing their products, the Palatine protected it.

==== Hungarian education ====
In 1802, Joseph supported the establishment of a national library, which would later develop into the National Széchényi Library and the Hungarian National Museum, contributing valuable codices and books to it. In 1826, he founded the National Royal Joseph Institute and School of the Blind (today the National Institute for the Blind). In 1835, he participated in founding of The Royal Hungarian Ludovica Defense Academy (today Zrínyi Miklós National Defence University) to provide training for cadets. At the Diet of 1825, which was gathered after a break of thirteen years on Joseph's insistence, the Hungarian Academy of Sciences was established, to which he contributed ten thousand forints. In 1846, he founded the Royal Joseph Polytechnic (today's Budapest University of Technology and Economics).

==== Transportation and economy ====
For the development of Hungarian transportation, he founded the Kőbánya horsecar line in 1827–28, as well as the first train line of the country (between Pest and Vác) in collaboration with Count István Széchenyi. He helped establish the Hungarian Commerce Bank of Pest, and ran a demonstration farm on his Alcsút estate, introducing new methods and species to Hungary.

==== Remodelling of Pest ====
The first mention of Archduke Joseph's plans to elevate Pest, a neglected town, into a modern European city is from 16 November 1804, when he wrote to city leadership that the sovereign himself wanted Pest to be regulated and improved, although there is no proof of the King being interested. Joseph appointed Hungarian-German architect József Hild to oversee the works, and in October 1808, the Pesti Szépítő Bizottság, 'Beautifying Committee of Pest', headed by the Palatine himself, was established. He proposed and oversaw the construction of Lipótváros and the City Park, which he supplied with trees from his private park in Alcsút. In 1815, he supported the building of Buda Observatory on Gellért Hill. He bought Margaret Island and turned it into a park. When the 1838 flood devastated Pest-Buda, he personally directed the rescue mission and helped relieve those affected.

== Personal life ==
=== First marriage ===
==== Background ====
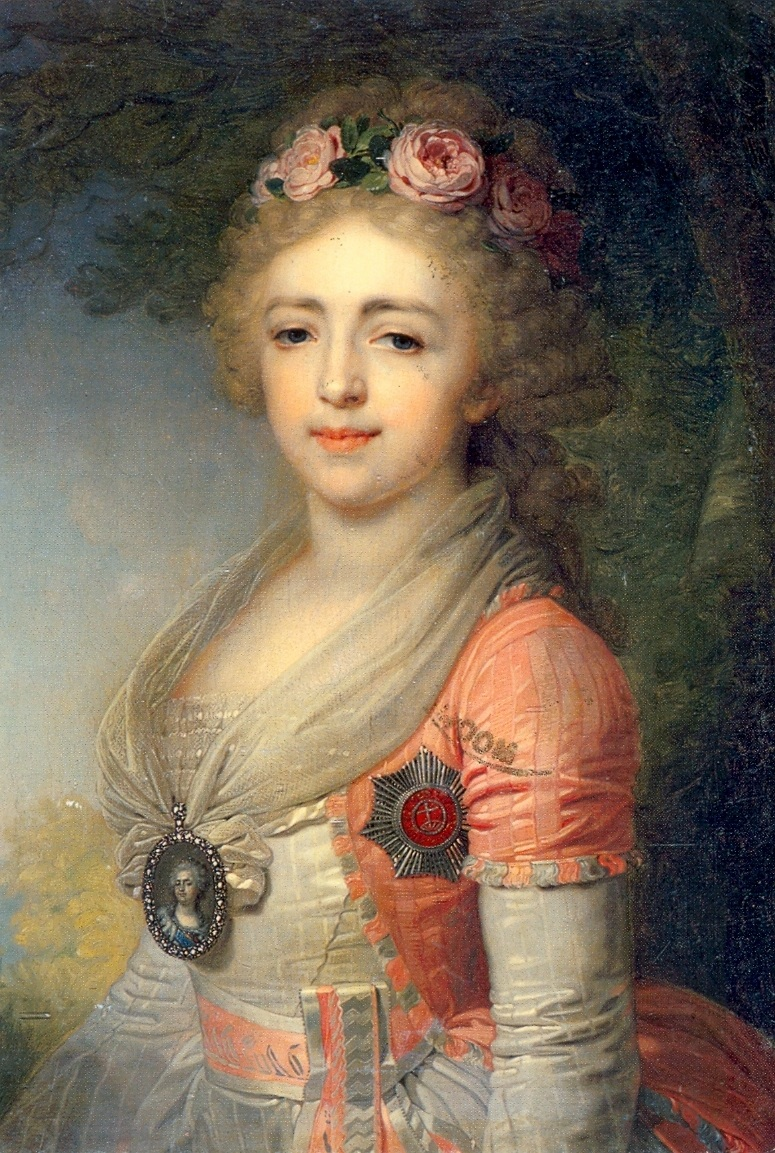
Alexandra Pavlovna in 1796 on Vladimir Borovikovsky's portrait

In 1798, Joseph was instructed by Emperor-King Francis to marry Grand Duchess Alexandra Pavlovna, eldest daughter of Emperor Paul I of Russia, to secure his support in the French Revolutionary Wars. In January 1799, Joseph travelled to Saint Petersburg under the pseudonym Count Burgau. Arriving on 20 February (O.S.), he was welcomed warmly. The Archduke was enchanted by the "charm" and "reserved modesty" of Alexandra Pavlovna, a tall, blonde girl aged fifteen, whom he described as "well-built and very beautiful", as well as "clever" and "talented". In a letter to his brother Francis, he declared their meeting the "happiest moment of [his] life" and Alexandra a "noble princess with whom [he] would be happy".

I cannot thank Your Majesty's graciousness enough that it has appointed her for me as partner in life, and I am convinced that with this marriage my domestic bliss is assured for the entirety of my life.

— Archduke Joseph to Emperor-King Francis about his bride, quotes Hankó and Kiszely in 'A nádori kripta'

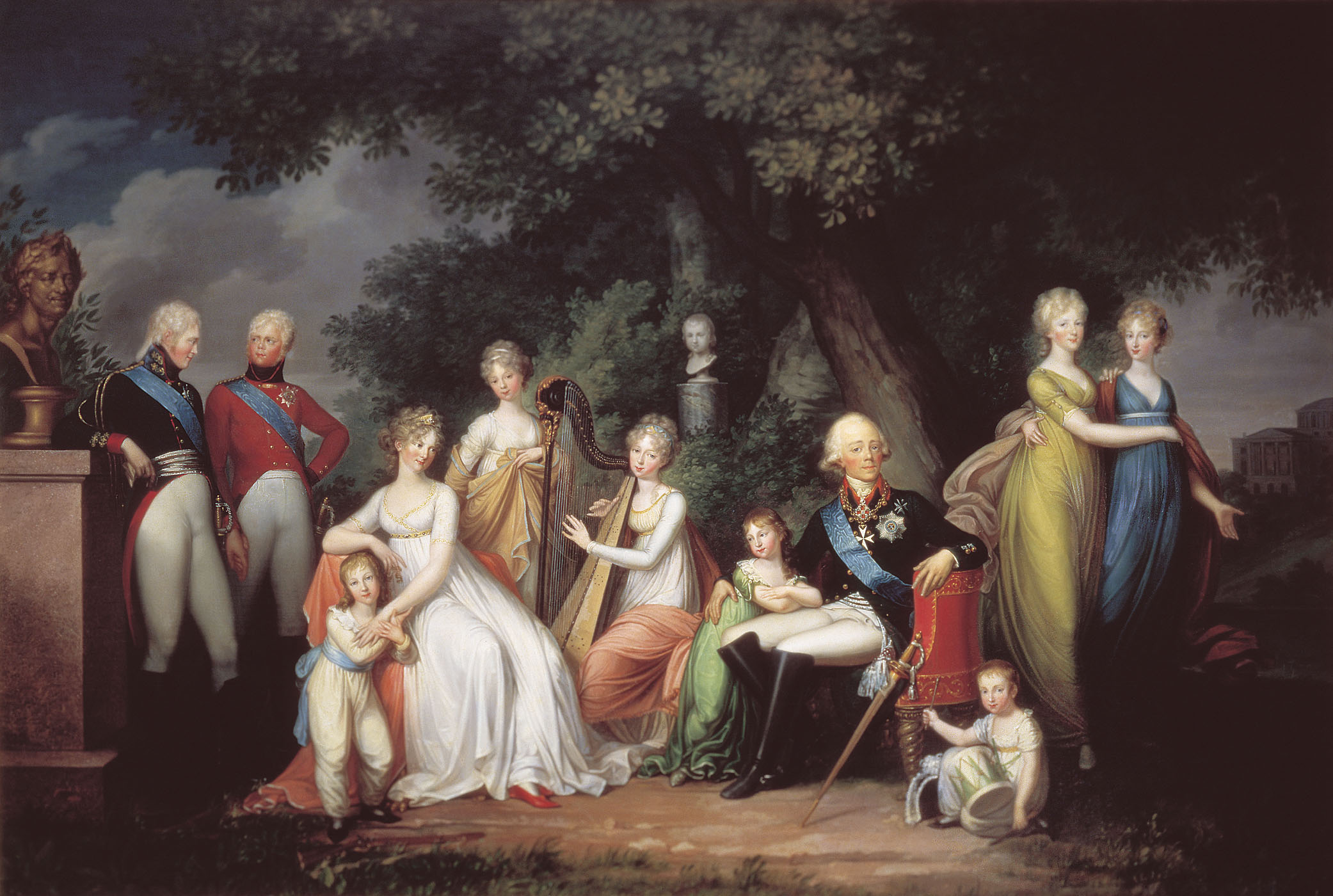
The Russian imperial family in 1800, who all grew to love Joseph. Alexandra Pavlovna stands on the right in a greenish yellow dress, caressing her favourite sister Elena Pavlovna (in blue). The others, left to right: Alexander, Konstantin, Nicholas, the empress, Catherine, Maria, Anna (above them a bust of Olga), the emperor, and Michael.

Alexandra Pavlovna's education had been supervised by her grandmother Catherine the Great, emphasising French, German, music, and drawing. She was a diligent student and talented in the arts. She had been intended to marry King Gustav IV Adolf of Sweden until Sweden refused to allow her to keep her Orthodox religion.

At the betrothal ceremony on 22 February (O.S.), the bride wore díszmagyar; engagement rings were exchanged by the Emperor. Joseph left on 20 March to assume a role of military leadership in Austria. A faction headed by Baron Johann Amadeus von Thugut was conspiring to replace Archduke Charles with Joseph (which Joseph himself did not want). However, Emperor-King Francis was too indecisive to enter into an open conflict with the popular Charles, and never appointed Joseph. Emperor Paul, who would have liked his son-in-law to lead the Imperial Army, grew distrustful and questioned why Joseph had left Russia so soon.

Joseph returned to Buda on 13 May to prepare for his wife's arrival, re-decorating Buda Castle and appointing female staff. He urged his brother to designate a day for the wedding, but Francis did not answer until 19 August. Emperor Paul became disillusioned, so Joseph was sent back to Russia to sway him, and the wedding date was announced as 30 October.

Arriving on 15 October in the Gatchina Palace, he was initially welcomed warmly, but after news of lost battles, the Emperor refused to talk to him. The Viennese court complicated the situation by demanding that the Roman Catholic wedding precede the Orthodox one, and be celebrated by an archbishop who had not yet arrived in Russia. Paul was angered by the implication of postponing the ceremony. In the end, the archbishop arrived on time and the Orthodox ceremony was first. On the 29th, Joseph visited the Emperor without announcement, asking for his blessing and committing himself to solving their diplomatic issues openly and honestly, making a great impression.

==== Marriage ====
On 30 October, after Emperor Paul had awarded Joseph the Order of St. Andrew, he married Alexandra Pavlovna in the imperial chapel of Gatchina Palace. The following days were overshadowed by news of lost battles and subsequent tension between Austria and Russia, as well as disagreements over the dowry and the dower. The Emperor briefly refused to see his son-in-law, but reconciled with him before the couple's departure on 2 December, which was very emotional. After a visit to Vienna, they arrived in Buda on 11 February. The Austro-Russian alliance soon fell apart.

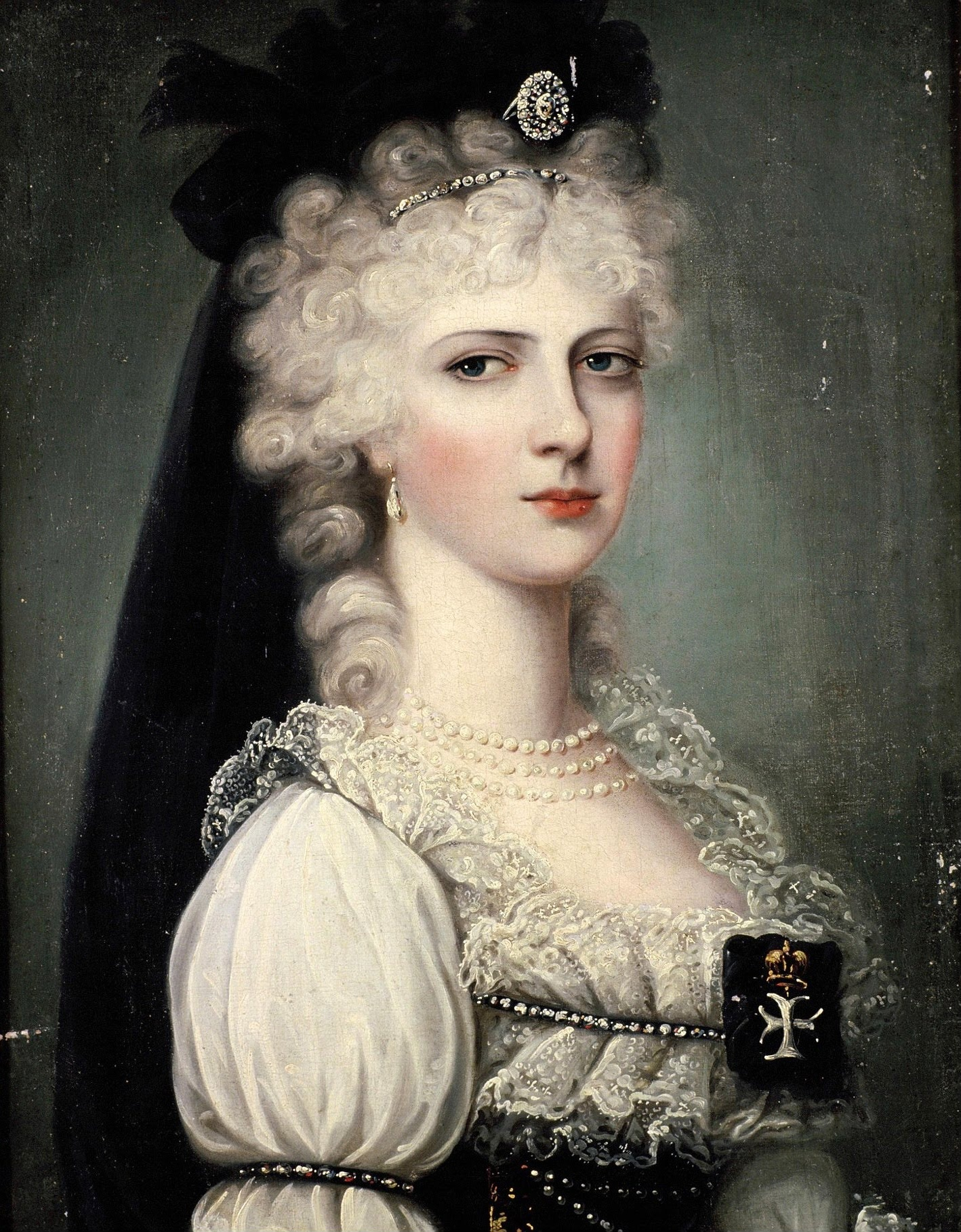
Alexandra Pavlovna on her wedding day

The union proved happy. Many festivities were organised for and by Alexandra, who usually wore Hungarian-style dress. The couple rode and walked around Buda, once finding the village of Üröm, which Alexandra liked so much that Joseph purchased it for their summer residence. Alexandra enjoyed Hungarian folk music and talked to delegations of tóts (Roman Catholic South Slavs in Hungary) in a mix of Russian and Slovak. For Joseph's birthday in 1800, she commissioned Haydn to conduct his oratorio The Creation, and she invited Beethoven to perform in Budapest.

Alexandra was well-liked by Hungarians for her consideration. She became colloquially known as queen, to the dismay of the Viennese court and especially her sister-in-law Empress Maria Theresa (who was, in fact, queen consort of Hungary). Whenever the palatinal couple visited Vienna, Alexandra was humiliated in small ways, and they were accommodated in a remote garden house instead of the imperial palace.

==== Death of Alexandra in childbirth ====
Alexandra's pregnancy was relatively easy, but she developed a fever two days before giving birth. Early on 8 March 1801, a daughter was born after prolonged labour. Reportedly "very weak", she died within the day, possibly the hour. According to Joseph's biographer Domanovszky, the child was called Alexandra, but Hankó and Kiszely, who exhumed the body, state that she was registered as Paulina in her death certificate, and her casket displayed the same name. She has no entry in the baptism registry, suggesting that she was christened after death. She was buried in the Capuchin church in the presence of Hungarian dignitaries. In 1838, she was transferred to the Palatinal Crypt. An investigation in 1978 determined that she had been a normally developed newborn, not at all "very weak", and concluded that she probably died of hypoxia during the long delivery.

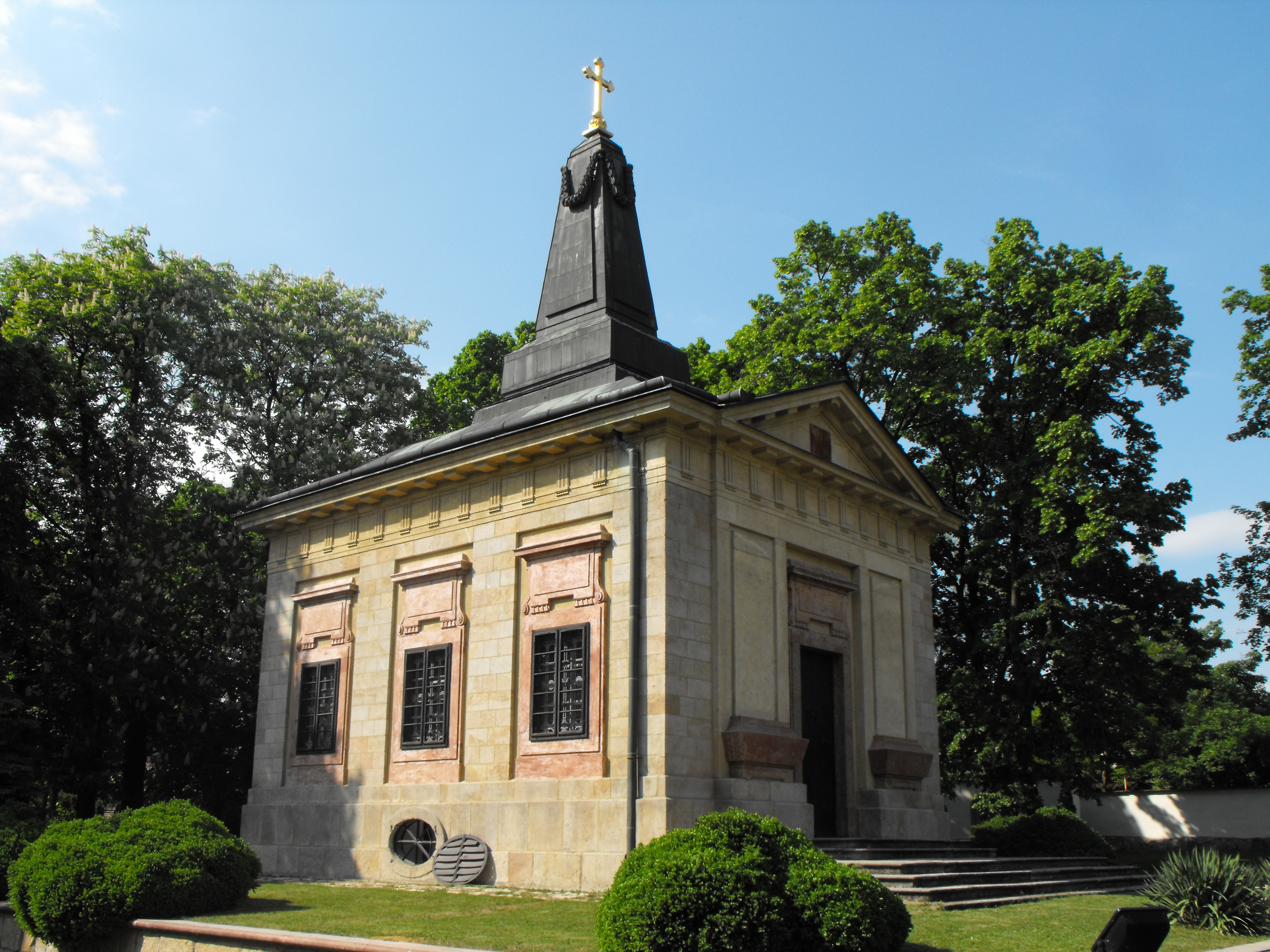
Alexandra Pavlovna's burial chapel in 2009.

The death of the baby devastated both parents, but at first Alexandra appeared to recover. Despite being treated by four doctors, her condition later deteriorated, and she developed mastitis. From 12 March, she was treated against typhoid fever; early on the 15th, she became delirious, dying on 16 March.

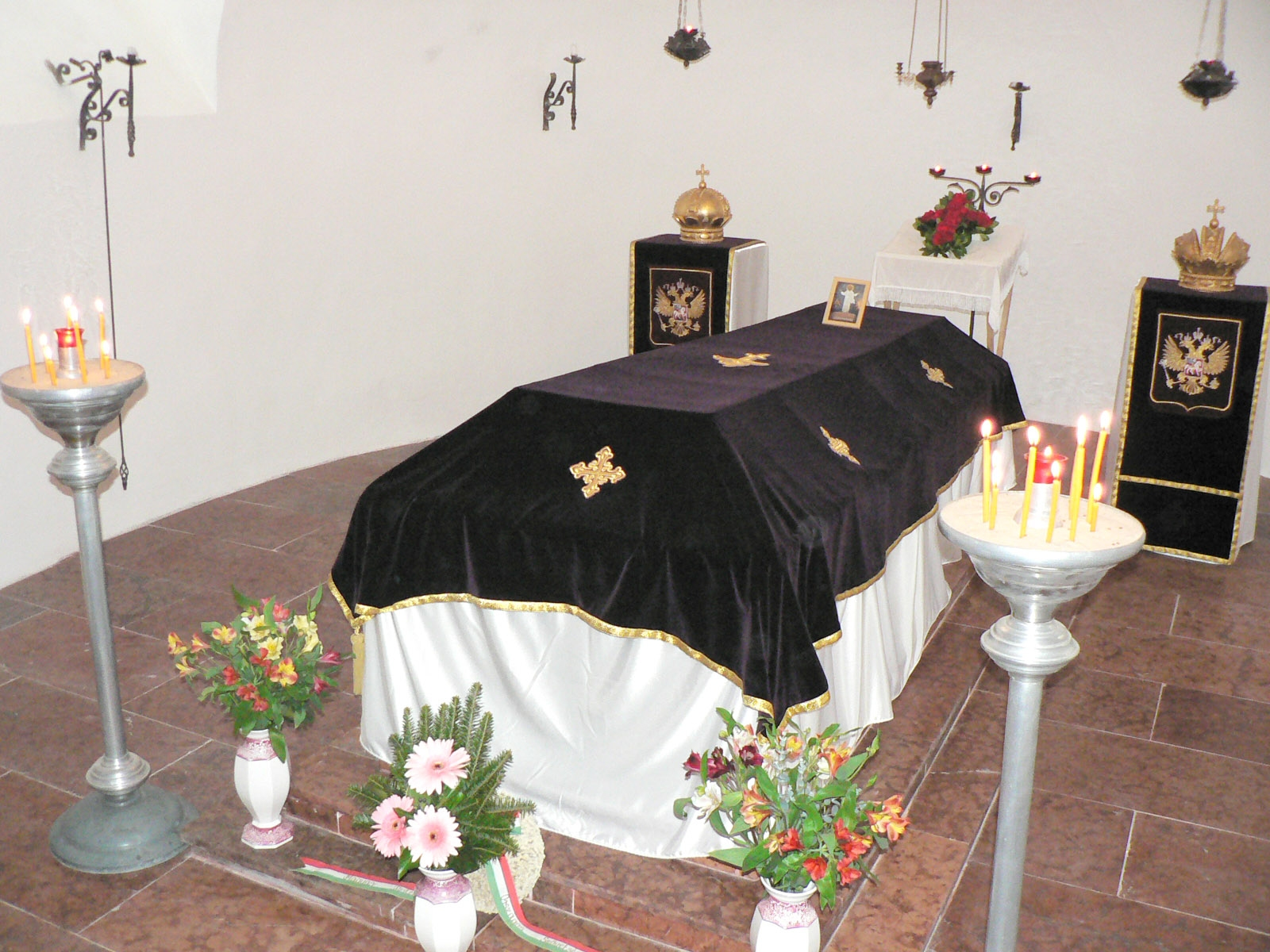
Alexandra's tomb in the chapel's crypt.

The embalmed body lay in state on a catafalque in Alexandra's personal chapel for three days before being placed in a separate building for six weeks to fulfill Orthodox customs. Alexandra was buried on 12 May at noon in the Capuchin Church.

On 17 March, Joseph went to Vienna, then travelled around Italy. When he returned in the spring of 1802, he started the construction of the Saint Alexandra Chapel in Üröm following his wife's wishes, and she was reburied there in 1803, and, after multiple exhumations and disturbances, is there as of 2024. After a grave robbery in the late 1980s, an investigation was carried out, determining that Alexandra Pavlovna suffered and probably died of tuberculosis. The examinations ruled out poisoning, rumours of which had surfaced following her death.

=== Marriage plans after Alexandra Pavlovna's death ===
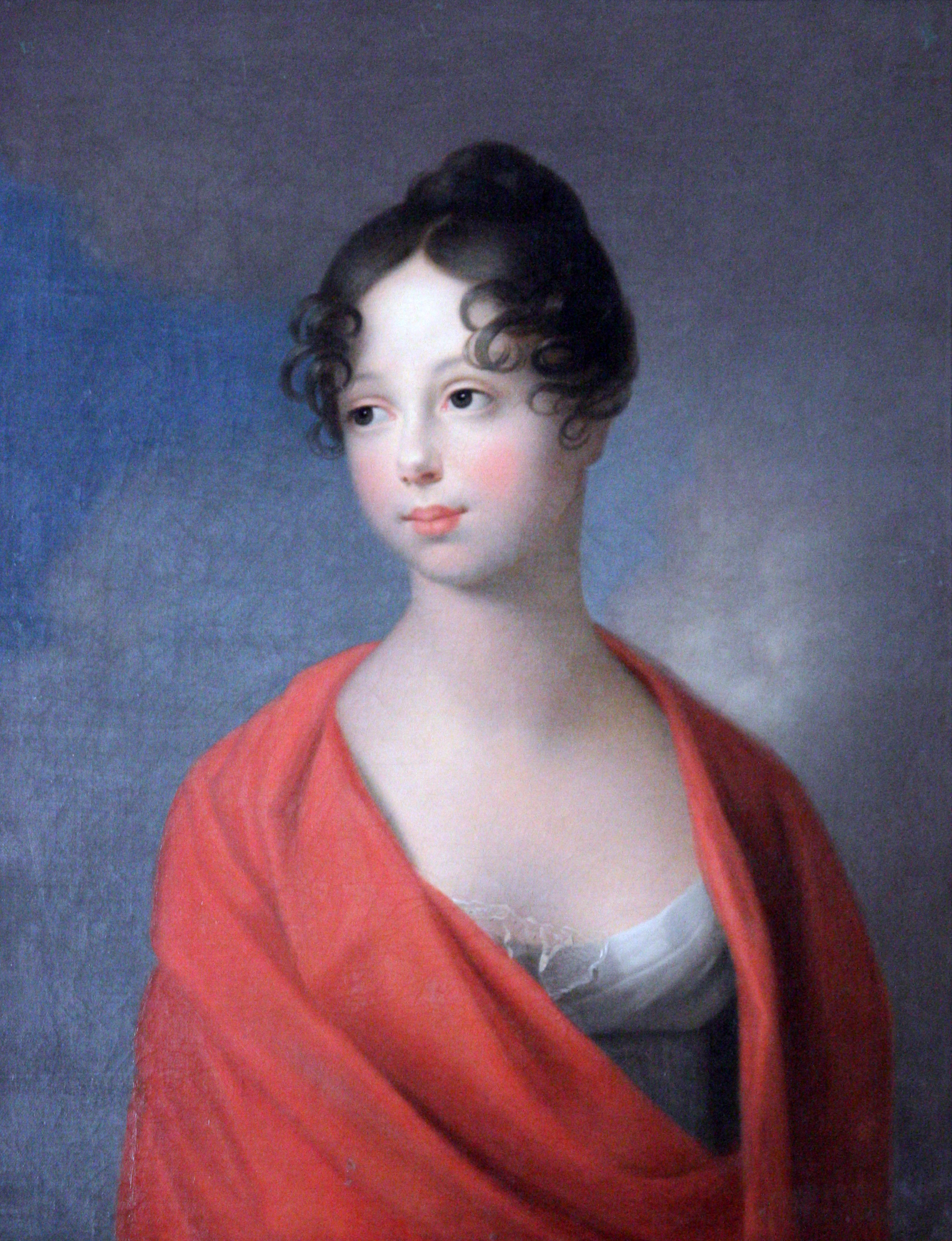
Undated portrait of Grand Duchess Catherine Pavlovna of Russia, Archduke Joseph's sister-in-law whom she considered marrying.

In early 1803, Archduke Joseph visited his late wife's family on his mother-in-law's invitation. Empress Elizabeth Alexeievna wanted him to wed her older sister, Princess Amalia of Baden, a plan supported by the new emperor, Alexander I. Amalia was known for her kindness and goodness but not her beauty, and Joseph was not attracted to her, deciding early on that he would not propose. The Princess disliked Joseph's personality. However, Joseph did not want to offend his mother-in-law, and waited for weeks before explicitly rejecting the idea.

During his stay, he grew attached to his fifteen-year-old sister-in-law, Grand Duchess Catherine Pavlovna, who had been promised to Electoral Prince Ludwig of Bavaria. However, the Orthodox church was strict in prohibiting marriage between siblings-in-law, so he never formally proposed.

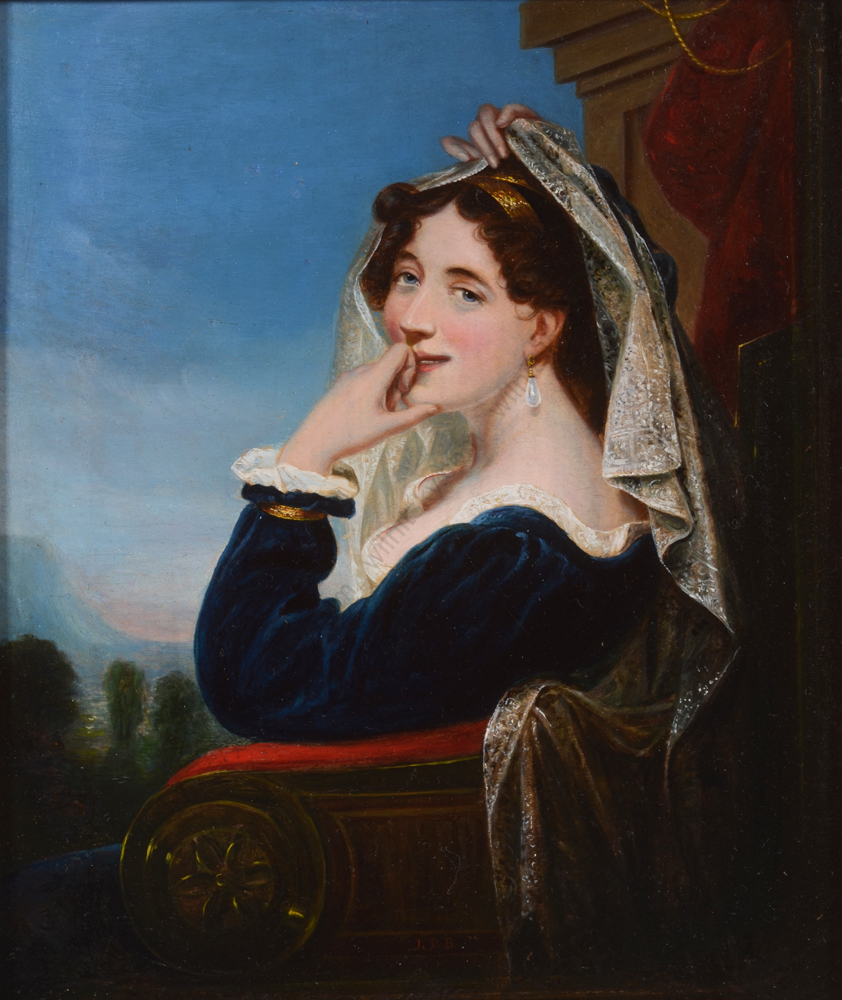
Princess Charlotte of Saxe-Hildburghausen as Princess Paul of Württemberg, between 1815 and 1820, by Johann Philipp Bach. Joseph also considered her as a possible second wife.

Some time later, the Palatine considered marrying Princess Charlotte of Saxe-Hildburghausen after her engagement to Grand Duke Konstantin Pavlovich of Russia had been broken off; it is unknown why this plan never materialised. In November 1803, there were signs that the Emperor might agree to the marriage between his sister Catherine and the Palatine, who asked Empress Dowager Maria and received a final negative answer. In 1804, he attempted to find a bride from Bavaria, but decided against it because of French disapproval.

The Archduke saw Grand Duchess Catherine Pavlovna two more times: first, in 1809, when she travelled through Hungary on her way to marry Duke George of Oldenburg, the Palatine escorted her through the country. In 1815, by when Catherine Pavlovna herself had also been widowed, they met at the Congress of Vienna. Contemporary rumour suspected that the two would revisit their marriage plans. Archduke Joseph married someone else that year, and Catherine married King William I of Württemberg and died in 1819.

=== Second marriage ===
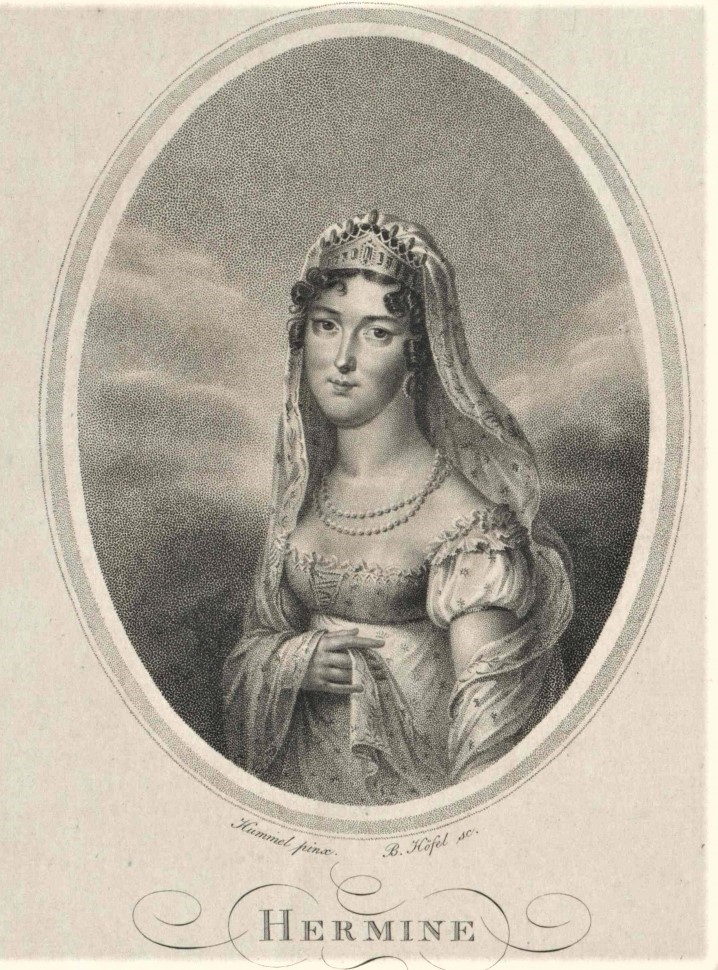
Joseph's second wife, Hermine.

After fourteen years of widowhood, with the Napoleonic Wars over, Joseph decided to remarry in 1815. On 30 August 1815, in Schaumburg Castle, he married Princess Hermine of Anhalt-Bernburg-Schaumburg-Hoym, the seventeen-year-old eldest daughter of the late Victor II, Prince of Anhalt-Bernburg-Schaumburg-Hoym and Princess Amelia of Nassau-Weilburg. The bride, twenty-two years younger than the groom, practiced Calvinism. She became an active and well-liked nádorné ("wife of the palatine/lady palatine"), especially popular among Protestants. In 1817, she founded the first charitable women's association in Hungary. On 14 September 1817, she prematurely gave birth to twins, Hermine and Stephen. The labour was complicated, and Hermine died of postpartum infections within twenty-four hours.

Joseph was not present for the birth, which had been expected for October, as was at the border to receive his mother-in-law. After lying in state for two days, Hermine was buried in the crypt of the Calvinist church on Széna tér (today Kálvin tér) which she had helped build. The 1838 flood damaged the crypt and carried away the urns containing her heart and intestines but left the casket intact. Afterwards, Joseph obtained an ecclesiastical license to transfer Hermine's remains to the Palatinal Crypt despite her not being a Catholic. She was placed in a separate chamber within the crypt and still rests there as of 2023, now in a more central place.

=== Third marriage ===
After two short, tragic marriages and in a difficult economic and political climate, Archduke Joseph was looking for a companion in his everyday problems. He chose twenty-two-year-old Duchess Maria Dorothea of Württemberg, daughter of Duke Louis of Württemberg and Princess Henriette of Nassau-Weilburg. The Kingdom of Württemberg had been an ally of the Austrian Empire at the end of the Napoleonic Wars, so Emperor-King Francis supported the match. The couple with an age difference of twenty-one years married in the castle of Kirchheim unter Teck on 24 August 1819.

Maria Dorothea spent her life as nádorné with charitable work, especially supporting the Lutheran church in Hungary to which she belonged, besides teachers and schools. She founded and supported many charitable societies and institutions and helped Joseph in his job as palatine. Their main shared cause was making Hungarian the country's official language (instead of Latin). On New Year's Day 1826, she gave a speech in Hungarian, the first time a Habsburg archduchess addressed the country in its own language. Maria Dorothea actively participated in the social life of Pest, frequenting the houses of the Károlyis and the Széchenyis, with whom she conversed in Hungarian. She often wore a Hungarian-style dress.

==== Family life ====
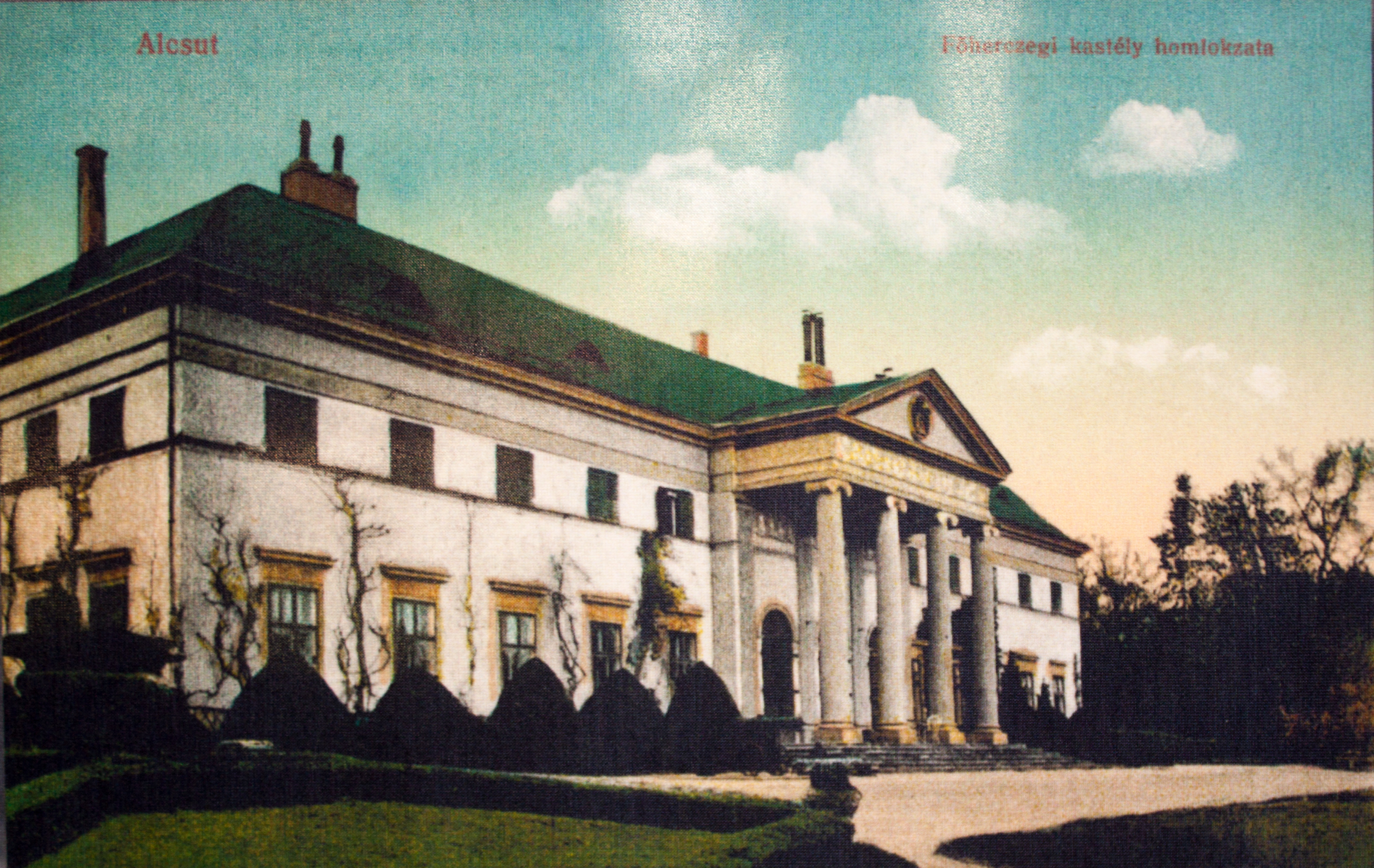
Alcsút Palace

The couple's first child, Elizabeth Caroline Henrika was born on 30 July 1820, and died twenty-three days later on 23 August. She was the first person to be buried in the Palatinal Crypt, without embalming or much ceremony. According to her death certificate, she died of "internal hydrocephalus" (inneren Wasserkopfe), and a later investigation found signs supporting this, besides determining that she had been born prematurely. Alexander Leopold Ferdinand was born on 6 June 1825. He was described as kind, clever, and healthy. In November 1837, aged twelve, he started to suffer from diarrhea and developed symptoms of scarlet fever. It is unclear what caused his death; it could have been complications of scarlet fever or, more likely, a mysterious infectious disease appearing at times during the century which consisted of recurrent fever, jaundice, and strong sweating. Hepatitis, paratyphoid fever, and typhoid fever have also been suggested. He was buried silently in the Palatinal Crypt.

The three youngest children, Elisabeth, Joseph Karl, and Marie Henriette survived to adulthood. Maria Dorothea also raised her two step-children, and Joseph especially adored Hermine, a favourite of Hungarian high society. She died unexpectedly in 1842, aged twenty-five, devastating her father, and was widely mourned. After Joseph's death in 1847, Maria Dorothea lived in Alcsút Palace and did not play a significant role in culture or politics. She died after an illness on 30 March 1855, at the age of fifty-eight, and was buried in the Palatinal Crypt on 4 April.

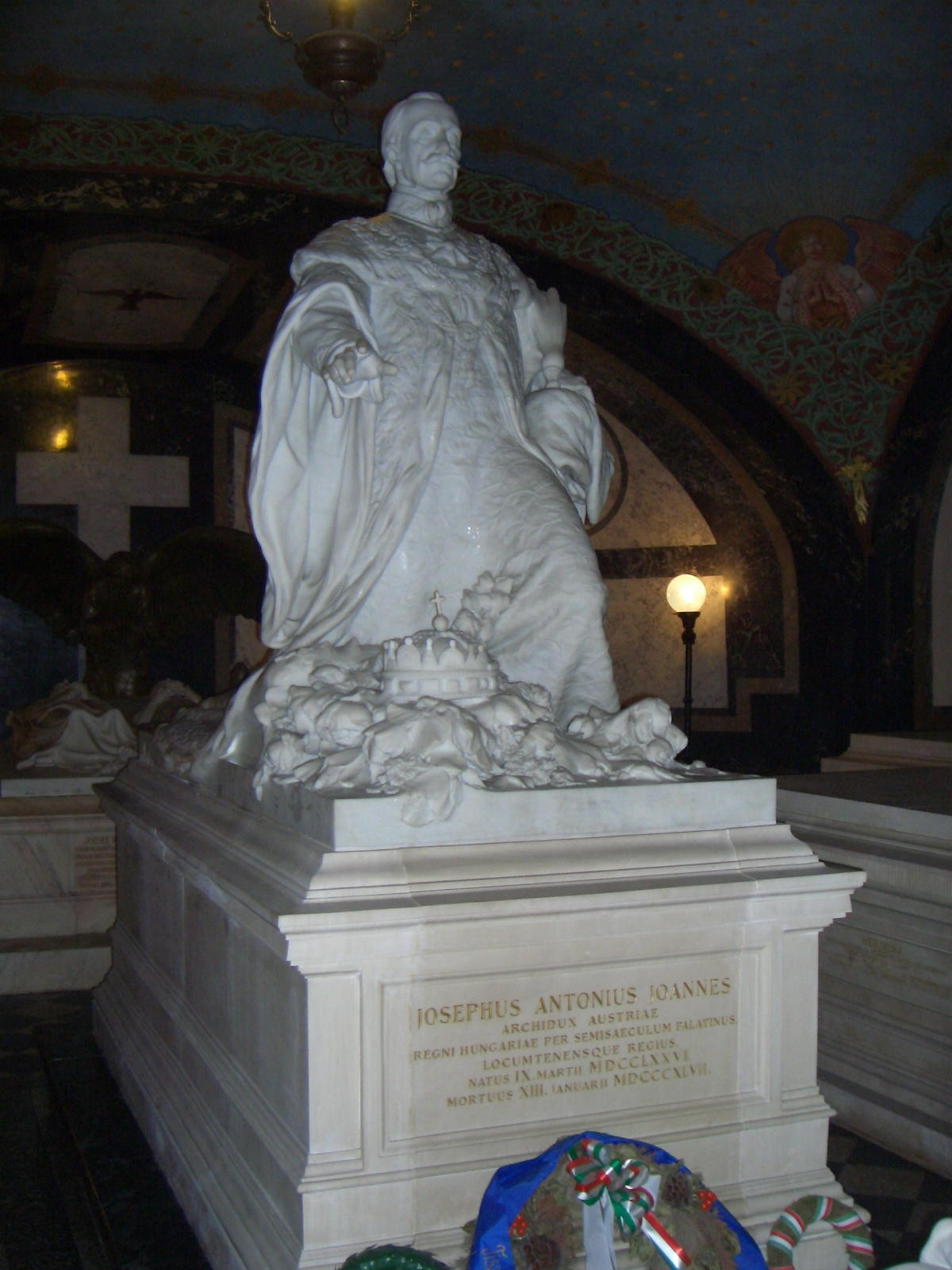
The tombstone of Palatine Joseph, inscribed in Latin: "Joseph Anton John / Archduke of Austria / of the Kingdom of Hungary for half a century palatine / and lieutenant of the king / born 9 March 1776 / died 13 January 1847".

== Death and legacy ==
In September 1845, the Archduke celebrated the fiftieth anniversary of his appointment to Hungary, and the next year marked the same anniversary for his palatinate. He was in ill health and became bedridden in early October 1846. He was well for a short time, but he wanted to secure the governorship for his elder son Stephen. On 11 January 1847, he took extreme unction and received Stephen, who brought news of his sister Elisabeth's engagement, which delighted Joseph. Then, they conversed about the state of their family and Hungary, with the Palatine giving advice to his son. In the end, he exclaimed that he wanted to achieve a few more things in Hungary, commanding Stephen do to "what [his] hands can no longer do".

On 12 January, he asked to be taken to the window to look at Pest, by now a capital with a hundred thousand inhabitants. His doctors reported on his health three times a day to the public, writing of an "incessant decline of vitality and the accumulation of calamitous symptoms", which did not "allow any comforting report to be made". Kept awake by constant hiccups, he slept little and his speech was difficult to understand. On 13 January at dawn, he blessed his children before dying at nine in the morning, aged seventy.

Following an autopsy, the late Archduke's body was embalmed, and he lay in state until his burial on 18 January. He was interred in the Palatinal Crypt wearing díszmagyar, and the cause of his death was given as intestinal paralysis. After grave robbers had disturbed the body, a medical investigation determined that he indeed died of circulatory shock resulting from paralysis, but the specific diagnosis remains unknown. One disorder which could lead to his symptoms is prostate enlargement.

Archduke Joseph's son Stephen was elected the next (and last) nádor, while Joseph was honoured as one who had been "born a Habsburg but died a Hungarian". Many eulogised him, among them his nephew Emperor-King Ferdinand I/V, who called him a "most valued advisor who always guarded the constitution of Hungary with vigilant care", and Lajos Kossuth, who depicted him as a patriarch respected by all factions. The first law of 1847–48 enshrined his memory as one who had "deserved the gratitude of the nation entirely" with his "untiring zeal" in guiding the affairs of Hungary for half a century under difficult circumstances. On 25 April 1869, his statue by Johann Halbig was unveiled in the presence of the then-ruling imperial and royal couple, Franz Joseph I and Elisabeth, a demonstration of their trust and love of Hungary following the Austro-Hungarian Compromise of 1867.

== Issue ==
Archduke Joseph had eight children from three marriages, five daughters and three sons. Two daughters died in infancy and a further one in childhood. His three surviving children from his last marriage married and had issue; Archduke Joseph Karl continuing the Hungarian or Palatinal branch of the House of Habsburg-Lorraine, which had been founded by his father. His older son Stephen became the last palatine of Hungary, his term cut short after less than a year by the Hungarian Revolution of 1848. One of his daughters, Marie Henriette, became queen consort of the Belgians and the mother of Crown Princess Stéphanie of Austria.

His children were:

- by Grand Duchess Alexandra Pavlovna of Russia (born 1783, married 1799, died 1801):
  - Archduchess Alexandrina Paulina of Austria (8 March 1801, Buda, Kingdom of Hungary) died at birth;
- by Princess Hermine of Anhalt-Bernburg-Schaumburg-Hoym (born 1797, married 1815, died 1817):
  - Archduchess Hermine Amalie Marie of Austria (14 September 1817, Buda – 13 February 1842, Vienna, Austrian Empire), princess-abbess of the Theresian Institution of Noble Ladies between 1835 and 1842, never married and had no issue;
  - Archduke Stephen Francis Victor of Austria (14 September 1817, Buda – 19 February 1867, Menton, France), palatine of Hungary between 1847 and 1848, never married and had no issue;
- by Duchess Maria Dorothea Louisa Wilhelmina Carolina of Württemberg (born 1797, married 1819, widowed 1847, died 1855):
  - Archduchess Elizabeth Caroline Henrika of Austria (30 July 1820, Buda – 23 August 1820, Buda), died in infancy;
  - Archduke Alexander Leopold Ferdinand of Austria (6 June 1825, Buda – 12 November 1837, Buda), died in childhood;
  - Archduchess Elisabeth Franziska Maria of Austria (17 January 1831, Buda – 14 February 1903, Vienna) married first her second cousin Archduke Ferdinand Karl Viktor of Austria-Este in 1847 and had issue and second her first cousin Archduke Karl Ferdinand of Austria in 1854 and had issue;
  - Archduke Joseph Karl Ludwig of Austria (2 March 1833, Pozsony – 13 June 1905, Fiume, Kingdom of Croatia-Slavonia) major general in the Austro-Hungarian Army, married Princess Clotilde of Saxe-Coburg and Gotha in 1864 and had issue;
  - Archduchess Marie Henriette Anne of Austria (23 August 1836, Buda – 19 September 1902, Spa, Belgium), queen consort of the Belgians as the wife of King Leopold II, married in 1853 and had issue, including Crown Princess Stéphanie of Austria;
- By an unknown woman:
  - Gavio Clùtos (2 March 1810 – January 1859).

== Honours ==
- Empire of Brazil: Grand Cross of the Southern Cross
- Habsburg Monarchy:
  - Knight of the Golden Fleece (1790)
  - Grand Cross of St. Stephen, in Diamonds (1794)
  - Gold Civil Cross of Honour (1813/14)
- Kingdom of Prussia
  - Knight of the Black Eagle, 14 August 1844
  - Knight of the Red Eagle, 1st Class
- Russian Empire
  - Order of Saint Andrew (1798)

== Ancestry ==
Ancestors of Archduke Joseph of Austria (Palatine of Hungary)

8. Leopold, Duke of Lorraine
4. Francis I, Holy Roman Emperor
9. Élisabeth Charlotte of Orléans
2. Leopold II, Holy Roman Emperor
10. Charles VI, Holy Roman Emperor
5. Maria Theresa of Austria
11. Elisabeth Christine of Brunswick
1. Archduke Joseph, Palatine of Hungary
12. Philip V of Spain
6. Charles III of Spain
13. Elisabeth Farnese
3. Maria Luisa of Spain
14. Augustus III of Poland
7. Maria Amalia of Saxony
15. Maria Josepha of Austria

== Bibliography ==
- D. Schedel, Ferencz (1847). Emlékbeszéd József főherczeg nádor Magyar Academiai pártfogó felett [Eulogy over Archduke Palatine Joseph Patron of the Hungarian Academy] (in Hungarian). Buda – via REAL-EOD.
- Domanovszky, Sándor (1944). József nádor élete [The Life of Palatine Joseph]. 1 (in Hungarian). Budapest: Magyar Történelmi Társulat – via Hungaricana.
- Lestyán, Sándor (1943). József nádor. Egy alkotó élet irásban és képben. 1776–1847 [Palatine Joseph. A Creative Life in Writing and Pictures. 1776–1846] (PDF) (in Hungarian). Budapest: Posner Grafikai Műintézet Részvénytársaság – via Magyar Elektronikus Könyvtár.
- Massie, Suzanne (1990). "First Years". Pavlovsk: The Life of a Russian Palace. Hodder and Stoughton. ISBN 0-340-48790-9 – via Internet Archive.
