= Archduke Stephen of Austria (Palatine of Hungary) =

Palatine of Hungary (1817–1867)

Archduke Stephen
- Prince Royal of Hungary and Bohemia
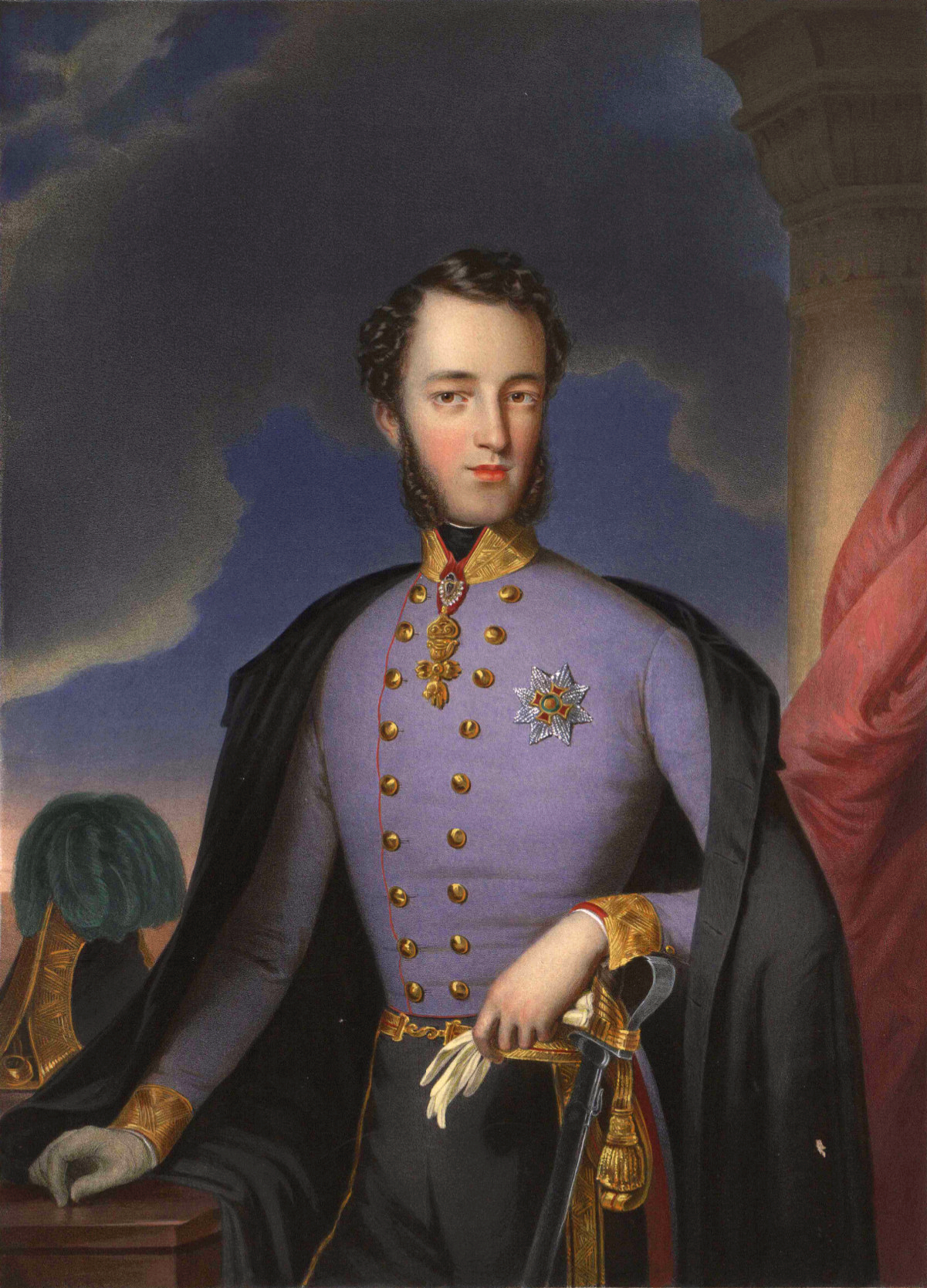
- Portrait painting by Anton Stadler

104th Palatine of the Kingdom of Hungary
- In office 13 January 1847 – 25 September 1848
- Monarch: Ferdinand V
- Prime Minister: Lajos Batthyány
- Predecessor: Archduke Joseph
- Successor: Office abolished

Supreme Commander of the Hungarian Revolutionary Army
- In office 15 September 1848 – 22 September 1848
- Prime Minister: Lajos Kossuth
- Predecessor: Position established
- Successor: János Móga
- Born: 14 September 1817; Buda, Kingdom of Hungary, Austrian Empire
- Died: 19 February 1867 (aged 49); Menton, French Empire
- Burial: Buda Castle, Budapest
- House: Habsburg-Lorraine
- Father: Archduke Joseph of Austria
- Mother: Princess Hermine of Anhalt
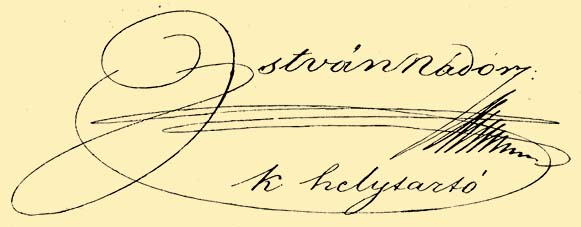
- Signature

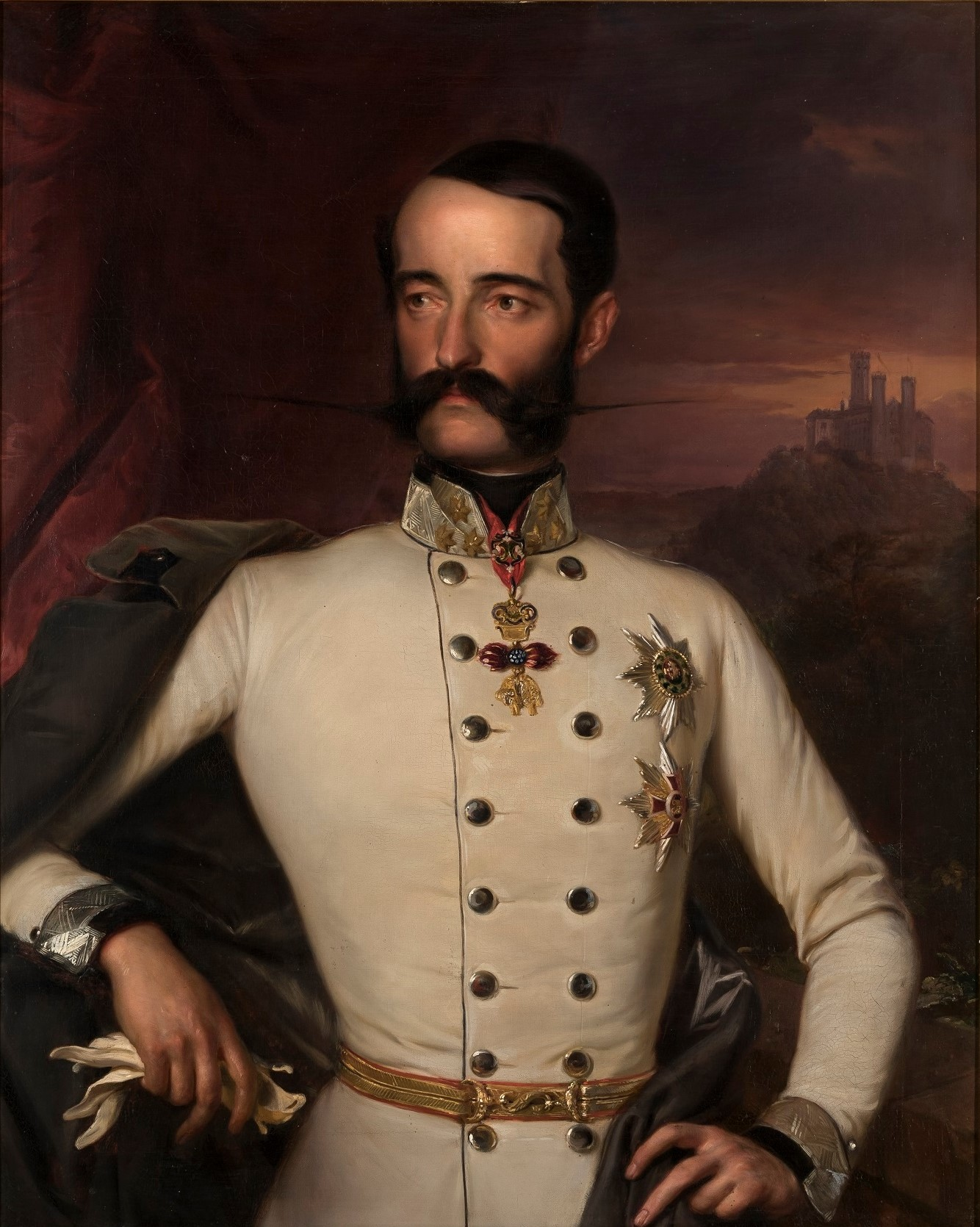
Portrait by Anton Einsle, c. 1850

Archduke Stephen Francis Victor (German: Stephan Franz Viktor; Hungarian: István Ferenc Viktor; 14 September 1817 – 19 February 1867) was a member of the House of Habsburg-Lorraine and the last Palatine of Hungary, serving from 1847 to 1848.

== Biography ==
He was the son of Archduke Joseph, Palatine of Hungary and Hermine of Anhalt-Bernburg-Schaumburg-Hoym. His mother died shortly after giving birth to him and his twin sister, Archduchess Hermine of Austria. He was brought up by his stepmother, Maria Dorothea of Württemberg.

He spent much of his childhood in Buda and at the family estate in Alcsút and received an excellent education. He was mainly interested in political science, which he also studied later in Vienna.

=== Career ===
From 1839 until 1841, he was a member of the imperial court in Vienna. In 1841, he travelled through the different countries of the monarchy, the Kingdom of Bohemia, the Kingdom of Lombardy–Venetia, the Tyrol, the Kingdom of Piedmont-Sardinia, the Papal States, Modena and Tuscany. In 1843, he gained the rank of lieutenant field marshal in the service of the Austrian Army and Emperor Ferdinand I of Austria appointed him governor of Bohemia. He stayed in that capacity until, in January 1847, his father died. Stephen succeeded him as Palatine of Hungary on 12 November 1847 but resigned in September 1848 as a result of the Hungarian Revolution.

Archduke Stephen died in 1867, unmarried and without issue.

== Honours ==
He received the following orders and decorations:

- Austria:
  - Knight of the Golden Fleece, 1830
  - Grand Cross of the Royal Hungarian Order of St. Stephen, 1847
  - Grand Cross of the Imperial Order of Leopold
- (Saxe-Coburg and Gotha) (Duchy of Saxe-Altenburg) (Saxe-Meiningen) Ernestine duchies: Grand Cross of the Saxe-Ernestine House Order, March 1839
- Parma: Senator Grand Cross of the Constantinian Order of St. George, with Collar, 1842
- Hesse-Darmstadt: Grand Cross of the Ludwig Order, 2 July 1843
- Hesse-Kassel: Knight of the Golden Lion, 29 July 1843
- Oldenburg: Grand Cross of the Order of Duke Peter Friedrich Ludwig, with Golden Crown, 6 August 1843
- Prussia:
  - Knight of the Black Eagle, August 1843
  - Knight of the Red Eagle, 1st Class
- Ascanian duchies: Grand Cross of the Order of Albert the Bear, 22 August 1843
- Saxe-Weimar-Eisenach: Grand Cross of the White Falcon, 20 September 1843
- Baden:
  - Knight of the House Order of Fidelity, 1843
  - Grand Cross of the Zähringer Lion, 1843
- Hanover:
  - Knight of St. George, 1843
  - Grand Cross of the Royal Guelphic Order, 1843
- Württemberg: Grand Cross of the Württemberg Crown, 1843
- Nassau:
  - Knight of the Gold Lion of Nassau, November 1858
  - Grand Cross of the Order of Adolphe of Nassau, with Swords, November 1858
- Belgium: Grand Cordon of the Order of Leopold (military), 26 October 1862
- Bavaria: Knight of St. Hubert, 1863
- Russia:
  - Knight of St. Andrew, 1864
  - Knight of St. Alexander Nevsky, 1864
  - Knight of the White Eagle, 1864
  - Knight of St. Anna, 1st Class, 1864
- Brunswick: Grand Cross of the Order of Henry the Lion
- Tuscany: Grand Cross of St. Joseph

== Ancestry ==
Ancestors of Archduke Stephen of Austria (Palatine of Hungary)

8. Francis I, Holy Roman Emperor
4. Leopold II, Holy Roman Emperor
9. Maria Theresa of Austria
2. Archduke Joseph, Palatine of Hungary
10. Charles III of Spain
5. Infanta Maria Louisa of Spain
11. Princess Maria Amalia of Saxony
1. Archduke Stephen, Palatine of Hungary
12. Charles Louis, Prince of Anhalt-Bernburg-Schaumburg-Hoym
6. Victor II, Prince of Anhalt-Bernburg-Schaumburg-Hoym
13. Princess Amalie Eleonore of Solms-Braunfels
3. Princess Hermine of Anhalt-Bernburg-Schaumburg-Hoym
14. Charles Christian, Prince of Nassau-Weilburg
7. Princess Amelia of Nassau-Weilburg
15. Princess Carolina of Orange-Nassau

Archduke Stephen of Austria (Palatine of Hungary) House of Habsburg-Lorraine Cadet branch of the House of Lorraine Born: 14 September 1817 Died: 19 February 1867
Political offices
Preceded by Archduke Joseph	Palatine of Hungary; 1847–1848/1867	Succeeded by Archduke Joseph Karl as Titular Palatine of Hungary
