= Palatine of Hungary =

Highest-ranking office in the Kingdom of Hungary from the 11th century to 1848

Palatine of the Kingdom of Hungary
- A Magyar Királyság nádora

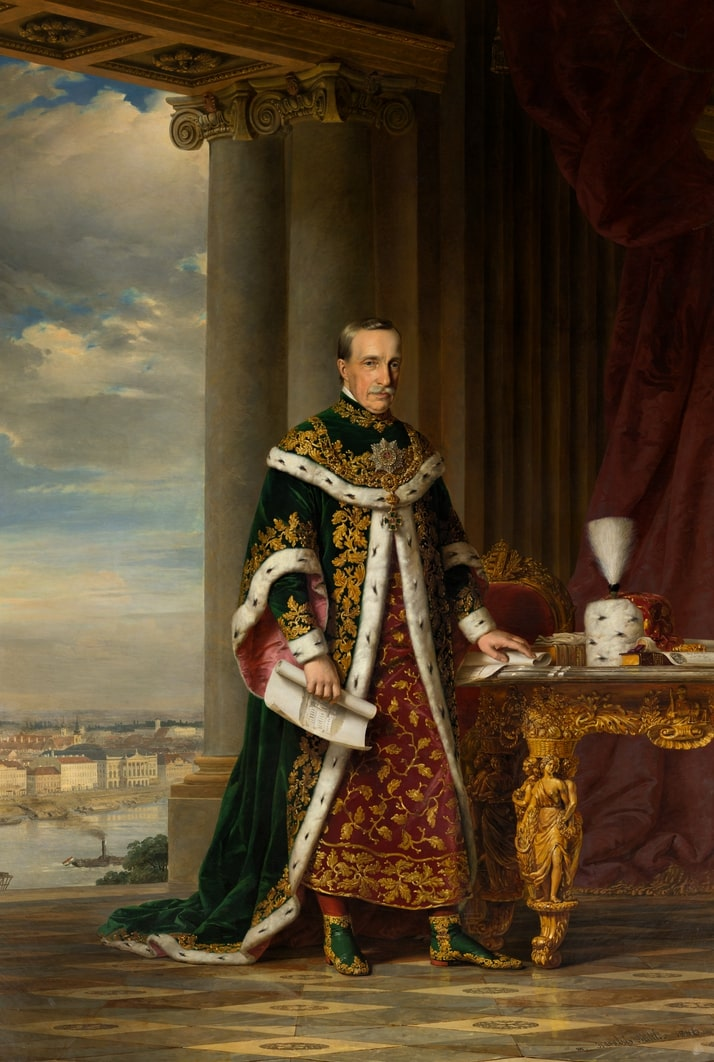
- Archduke Joseph; 20 September 1795 – 13 January 1847
- Style: Highness; Imperial and Royal Highness
- Residence: Buda Castle (1784–1848)
- Appointer: King of Hungary; Diet of Hungary
- Formation: early 11th century
- First holder: Samuel Aba
- Final holder: Archduke Stephen
- Abolished: 1848
- Succession: Prime Minister of Hungary (since 1867)

The Palatine of Hungary (Hungarian: nádor or nádorispán, German: Landespalatin, Latin: palatinus regni Hungariae) was the highest-ranking office in the Kingdom of Hungary from the beginning of the 11th century to 1848. Initially, Palatines were representatives of the monarchs, later (from 1723) the vice-regent (viceroy). In the early centuries of the kingdom, they were appointed by the king, and later (from 1608) were elected by the Diet of the Kingdom of Hungary. A Palatine's jurisdiction included only Hungary proper, in the Kingdom of Croatia until 1918 the ban held similar function as the highest office in the Kingdom (after the king himself), monarch's representative, commander of the royal army and viceroy (after the union of Croatia, Slavonia and Dalmatia with Hungary in 1102).

== Title ==
The earliest recorded Medieval Latin form of the title was comes palatii ("count of the palace"); it was preserved in the deed of foundation of the Tihany Abbey, issued in 1055. A new variant (comes palatinus) came into use in the second half of the 11th century; it was first recorded around 1067. The shortened palatinus form became the official version in the 1230s. A new official title – palatinus regni Hungariae ("Palatine of the Kingdom of Hungary") – was adopted in the 1340s, which shows that the palatines who were still royal officials were also regarded as representatives of the Estates of the realm from that time on.

The original Hungarian version of the title was nádorispán; it was first recorded around 1405. The etymology of the word is uncertain. Most scholars agree that its root is the Slavic word for court (dvorjь), but no documents evidence that the assumed *nadъ-dvorjь-županъ ("head of the royal court") form actually existed. In the Czech and Serbo-Croatian languages, similar expressions (náderšpan and nadršpan) existed, but only as loanwords from Hungarian, in reference to the palatines of Hungary.

Ludovicus Tubero and some other 16th-century scholars referred to the palatine as nándorispán. Historian András Róna-Tas says that the title may be connected to the Bulgars' old Hungarian exonym (nándor). If his theory is valid, the palatine was originally the head of the Bulgars in Hungary. Other scholars have not accepted Róna-Tas's theory, because the nándorispán version seems to have developed from the original nádorispán version. The modern Hungarian version of the title (nádor), which is the shortened version of the original title, was first recorded in 1784.

== History ==
=== Origins (c. 1000–c. 1100) ===
High-ranking officials who bore the title comes palatinus or comes palatii were present in several royal courts of medieval Europe. In the Carolingian Empire, the comes palatii was the monarch's deputy and one of the highest-ranking judges in the 9th century, according to the contemporaneous Hincmar. In Croatia, the zuppanus palatii was the head of the royal court in 892. In 11th-century Bohemia and in Poland, the "count of the palace" was the monarch's deputy in military affairs. According to a scholarly theory, the comes palatii was originally responsible for the administration of the royal household, but primary sources do not contain direct reference to the palatines' economic functions.

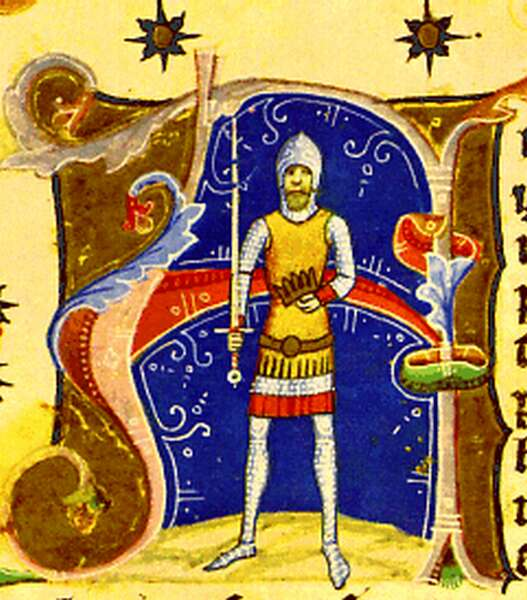
Aba, the first known Palatine, later King of Hungary (r. 1041–1044)

Hungarian historians agree that the imperial court of the Holy Roman Empire set the pattern for the organization of the royal household in Hungary. Historians also concur that the first king of Hungary, Stephen I, who died in 1038, appointed the first palatine, although no primary source mentioned this office during his reign. György Györffy says that one Comes Ceba, who was responsible for the transfer of ten villages to the Pannonhalma Archabbey on the king's behalf around 1005, must have been a palatine, because the villages were situated in many counties, suggesting that he was not the head of one county. The Long Life of Saint Gerard say that King Stephen I made Csanád "the master of the household of the king and Ajtony" after Csanád defeated Ajtony. Some historians (including Györffy and Gábor Thoroczkay) say that the text suggests that Csanád held the office of palatine for some time during Stephen's reign; other historians (for example, Tibor Szőcs and Tibor Almási) write that the author of the legend borrowed the expression from Psalm 105 which mentioned the "master" of the king's household. Nevertheless, Gerard of Csanád's same legend preserved the earliest historical event in connection with a palatine – the dethronement of Stephen I's successor, Peter Orseolo by "Count Palatine Aba" in 1041. According to modern scholars' consensus, Aba, who was Stephen I's brother-in-law or nephew, must have been made palatine by Stephen I.

A decree of King Coloman the Learned stated that messengers sent by the ispáns from the borderlands to the monarch were entitled to "claim the cost of travel and an equal amount for the return journey" from the palatine. No other primary sources contain direct evidence of the first palatines' economic duties, but other royal officials who were mentioned in 11th-century royal charters (including the ispáns and the stablemen) do not seem to have been responsible for the management of the royal household. Consequently, most historians say that most probably the palatines were the administrators of the royal domains and revenues up until the 1120s. The palatines' jurisdiction over the udvornici, or royal serving people, which is documented from the end of the 11th century, also validate this theory. The late 13th-century chronicler, Simon of Kéza, stated that it was King Coloman who had "made over his own udvornici for the use of the palatine of the realm", but Kéza's testimony is suspect.

In his Admonitions, King Stephen I declared that the kings should not judge legal cases in person, suggesting that a high-ranking official administered justice on the kings' behalf already in the first half of the 11th century. Modern historians agree that the palatine was that high official. A law-book, issued during or shortly before the reign of King Ladislaus I of Hungary, preserved the first reference to the palatines' judiciary function, ordering that a palatine who administer justice to people who fell outside his jurisdiction should pay a fine of "fifty-five pensae" (the equivalent of 2,000 pence). The same decree also ruled that the "count of the duke" was to pay the same amount if "he judges others besides his own people", which suggests that the head of the "duchy" was also entitled to appoint his own palatine.

=== Middle Ages (c. 1100–1485) ===
A new great officer, the curialis comes, appeared in the royal court in the first half of the 12th century. He was responsible for the management of the royal household. Authentic royal charters do not prove that the curialis comes administered justice on the king's behalf in the royal court in the 12th century, but according to a scholarly theory, he heard disputes in the royal court already during the reign of King Coloman's son, Stephen II of Hungary, which gave rise to the development of the palatines' own court of justice. The curialis comes was mentioned as iudex curie, or royal judge, after around 1219. Changes in the administration of the royal court and the palatines' office occurred around the same period. Hereafter the highest-ranking royal officials, including the palatine and the royal judge, were styled as "barons".

The first documents issued in a palatine's name is dated to about 1219. Up to that time, the palatines' decisions had not been recorded by their own officials, but by other authorities, especially by cathedral chapters. The earliest references to the palatines' deputies, who were later known as vicepalatines or the palatines' vicejudges, were also recorded in 1219. From the 1230s, the monarchs occasionally entrusted the palatines, along with other barons of the realm, with specific tasks. For instance, Andrew II sent Denis, son of Ampud on diplomatic missions; Stephen Gutkeled destroyed mills built without permission on the river Rába on Béla IV's orders.

The palatines acted as itinerant judges, wandering in the whole realm in the 1230s and early 1240s. Roland Rátót, who became palatine in 1248, abandoned this practice and mostly heard cases in Pressburg (now Bratislava in Slovakia). After Béla IV of Hungary and his son, Stephen divided the country along the river Danube in 1262, Stephen, who adopted the title of "junior king", set up his own royal court and made Denis Péc his palatine. Andrew III, who was crowned king in 1290, often made two influential noblemen palatines. During the interregnum that followed Andrew III's death, many oligarchs were styled palatines, including Amadeus Aba, Matthew Csák and Stephen Ákos.

He was also the judge of the Jászok (Alans), of the Cumanians and of the Jews. Title of Palatine is abolished in 1848.

From 1200, he was also the comes of several counties, thus being entitled to one third of the county taxes. From the 13th century, his deputy (vicepalatinus) was based in Pest (around 1300 temporarily in Old Buda), where he was simultaneously the county leader of the Pest county and judge of the middle nobility.

According to the Article II of Law 1439, the king could appoint the palatine only with the consent of the parliament.
The Diet of the Kingdom of Hungary of 1455 and 1456 issued the decree "de officio Palatini", which guaranteed the palatine's position as the representative of the king.

From around 1400 he was the viceregent of the king, a function which however only became important after 1526. He was allowed to command the royal army and to preside over the Diet of the Kingdom of Hungary instead of the king. When the king was not of age or if there was an interregnum, he also could convene the Diet. From around 1450 he had the right to grant royal property – like the king himself but with certain restrictions. An act of 1485 explicitly stipulated that the palatine shall be the viceregent in the king's absence.

=== Early Modern Times (1485–1608) ===
After 1526, when the Habsburgs became rulers of the kingdom and the Turks seized large parts of the kingdom, the palatine, as the vice-regent (viceroy), had his seat outside Royal Hungary in Prague and later in Vienna. In 1526, the palatine became a life function. In 1527, the palatine István Báthory created the Hungarian Vice-regency Council (a kind of government, seat in Pozsony (German: Pressburg, now Bratislava) since 1531) comprising also other noble representatives, which became a permanent institution headed by the palatine in 1549. In 1608, the functions of vice-regent and palatine were separated. The Palatine's office was suspended in 1673 when Emperor Leopold I appointed a Directorium to more directly administer Hungary in the crackdown that followed the Magnate conspiracy, however the office was restored in 1681. The Vice-regency council was abolished in 1673, but renewed in 1723, when the palatine became the official president of the council.

During the Hungarian Revolution of 1848, the palatine Archduke Stephen, a member of a junior branch of the Habsburgs, was a significant intermediary between the revolutionaries and the imperial court in Vienna. However, after 1848, the palatine was only a symbolic function, but it was only in 1918 – with the end of Habsburgs in the Kingdom of Hungary (the kingdom continued formally until 1945) – that the function ceased officially.

== Functions ==
=== Deputy of the monarch ===
The Golden Bull of 1222 authorized the palatine to represent the monarch at the great assembly which was customarily held at Székesfehérvár on the feast of King St Stephen in each year. The presence of the palatine at the yearly law-day enabled him to act as a mediator between the sovereign and the noblemen.

=== Judicial functions ===
Initially, the palatines administered justice on the kings' behalf, primarily in the royal court. A decree, attributed to King Ladislaus I, explicitly forbade the palatine from "send[ing] the seal" to anyone "except only to those who are called [udvornici] and to those who come to him voluntarily" while he was absent from the royal court. On the other hand, the decree also shows that in the second half of the 11th century, the palatine's jurisdiction over the udvornici was independent of his role as the sovereign's deputy. Around 1100, King Coloman authorized the palatine to hear appeals against decisions of judges from the counties "if a popular outcry arises against them". Four royal charters show that the palatines, along with other high-ranking royal officials, occasionally heard disputes between ecclesiastic institutions and royal people as judges, specifically assigned with the task by the monarchs in the 12th century.

The palatines' own court of justice is documented from the early 13th century. In 1201, King Emeric exempted the "guest settlers" in Sárospatak from the jurisdiction of all judges but the king and the palatine, which proves that the palatines had already heard cases on their own right, not only as the monarchs' representatives. The Golden Bull of 1222 declared that a palatine had jurisdiction over all inhabitants of Hungary, although he was only authorized to condemn a nobleman to death or confiscate a nobleman's property if the monarch had consented to it. The same decree was completed with a sentence which confirmed the jurisdiction of ecclesiastical courts (including the clergymen's immunity) in accordance with customary law when King Andrew II of Hungary confirmed the Golden Bull on the prelates' demand in 1231.

The count palatine shall judge without differentiation all the men of our realm, but cases concerning nobles condemned to capital punishment and loss of possessions shall not be concluded without the king's knowledge.

— Golden Bull of 1222

The count palatine shall judge without differentiation all the men of our realm except ecclesiastical persons and clerks, and cases concerning marriage, dowry, and other ecclesiastical matters which appear to belong for whatever reason to ecclesiastical jurisdiction. Cases concerning nobles condemned to capital punishment and loss of possessions shall not be concluded without the king's knowledge by any judge.

— Golden Bull of 1231

== Deputies ==
The earliest charters referring to the palatines' deputies mentioned them under several names, including vicarius palatini (in 1220 and 1221), and vicecomes palatini comitis and viceiudex palatini comitis (in 1221). The same documents, all preserved in the Regestrum Varadinense (including Maurice Pok), suggest that the palatine and his deputies administered justice during the same period but in faraway territories: while Palatine Nicholas Szák heard cases in the lands east of the river Tisza, his deputies worked in Transdanubia in 1220. This practise was obviously unpopular, because the Golden Bull of 1222 explicitly stated that the palatine "shall have no deputy judge except for the one at his own court".

== Important palatines ==
Important families that provided several palatines were: in the 11th, 12th, 13th and 14th century were the Aba (family), Lackfi, in the 15th century the Garay, afterwards the Báthory and the Zápolya, Esterházy, Pálffy, and ultimately the Joseph branch of the Habsburg.

Prominent palatines have been: in the early 17th century, István Illésházy of Trencsén, then up to 1616, György Thurzó and János Zakmárdi. Thurzó is the palatine who arrested Elizabeth Báthory, the countess accused for killing numerous girls and young women. The position was occupied in the remaining 17th century by members of the families Esterházy, Pálffy, Francis Wesselényi, Rhedey and others. The last palatines at the end of the 18th and the first half of the 19th century were the Habsburgs Archdukes Alexander Leopold, Joseph and his son Stephen, who resigned in 1848.

== Contrast ==
- Paladin
- Palatine
- Count palatine

== See also ==
- Ban of Croatia
- Ban of Slavonia
- Judge royal
- List of palatines of Hungary
- Master of the treasury
- Voivode of Transylvania

== Sources ==
=== Primary sources ===
- Simon of Kéza: The Deeds of the Hungarians (Edited and translated by László Veszprémy and Frank Schaer with a study by Jenő Szűcs) (1999). CEU Press. ISBN 963-9116-31-9.
- The Laws of the Medieval Kingdom of Hungary, 1000–1301 (Translated and Edited by János M. Bak, György Bónis, James Ross Sweeney with an essay on previous editions by Andor Czizmadia, Second revised edition, In collaboration with Leslie S. Domonkos) (1999). Charles Schlacks, Jr. Publishers.

=== Secondary sources ===
- Bartl, Július; Čičaj, Viliam; Kohútova, Mária; Letz, Róbert; Segeš, Vladimír; Škvarna, Dušan (2002). Slovak History: Chronology & Lexicon. Bolchazy-Carducci Publishers, Slovenské Pedegogické Nakladatel'stvo. ISBN 0-86516-444-4.
- Berend, Nora; Urbańczyk, Przemysław; Wiszewski, Przemysław (2013). Central Europe in the High Middle Ages: Bohemia, Hungary and Poland, c. 900–c. 1300. Cambridge University Press. ISBN 978-0-521-78156-5.
- C. Tóth, Norbert (2020). A Magyar Királyság nádora. A nádori és helytartói intézmény története (1342–1562) [Palatine of the Kingdom of Hungary. History of the Palatinal and Gubernatorial Institution (1342–1562)] (in Hungarian). Hungarian Historical Society. ISBN 978-963-416-237-7.
- Engel, Pál (1996). Magyarország világi archontológiája, 1301–1457, I [Secular Archontology of Hungary, 1301–1457, Volume I] (in Hungarian). História, MTA Történettudományi Intézete. ISBN 963-8312-44-0.
- Engel, Pál (2001). The Realm of St Stephen: A History of Medieval Hungary, 895–1526. I.B. Tauris Publishers. ISBN 1-86064-061-3.
- Fallenbüchl, Zoltán (1988). Magyarország főméltóságai [Great Officers of State in the Kingdom of Hungary] (in Hungarian). Maecenas Könyvkiadó. ISBN 963-02-5536-7.
- Györffy, György (2000). István király és műve [King Stephen and His Work] (in Hungarian). Balassi Kiadó. ISBN 963-506-382-2.
- Jankovicsné Tálas, Anikó (2006). "nádor [Palatine]". In Zaicz, Gábor (ed.). Etimológiai Szótár: Magyar szavak és toldalékok eredete [Etymological Dictionary: Origin of Hungarian Words and Affixes] (in Hungarian). TINTA Könyvkiadó. p. 559. ISBN 963-7094-01-6.
- Kontler, László (1999). Millennium in Central Europe: A History of Hungary. Atlantisz Publishing House. ISBN 963-9165-37-9.
- Pálffy, Géza (2009). The Kingdom of Hungary and the Habsburg Monarchy in the Sixteenth Century. Boulder. ISBN 978-0-88033-633-8.
- Petrovics, István (1994). "nádor [Palatine]". In Kristó, Gyula; Engel, Pál; Makk, Ferenc (eds.). Korai magyar történeti lexikon (9–14. század) [Encyclopedia of the Early Hungarian History (9th–14th centuries)] (in Hungarian). Akadémiai Kiadó. p. 473. ISBN 963-05-6722-9.
- Rady, Martyn (2000). Nobility, Land and Service in Medieval Hungary. Palgrave. ISBN 0-333-80085-0.
- Róna-Tas, András (1999). Hungarians and Europe in the Early Middle Ages: An Introduction to Early Hungarian History (Translated by Nicholas Bodoczky). CEU Press. ISBN 978-963-9116-48-1.
- Sedlar, Jean W. (1994). East Central Europe in the Middle Ages, 1000–1500. University of Washington Press. ISBN 0-295-97290-4.
- Szőcs, Tibor (2014). A nádori intézmény korai története, 1000–1342 [An Early History of the Palatinal Institution: 1000–1342] (in Hungarian). Magyar Tudományos Akadémia Támogatott Kutatások Irodája. ISBN 978-963-508-697-9.
- Zsoldos, Attila (2011). Magyarország világi archontológiája, 1000–1301 [Secular Archontology of Hungary, 1000–1301] (in Hungarian). História, MTA Történettudományi Intézete. ISBN 978-963-9627-38-3.
