= Jenő Rákosi =

Hungarian writer, journalist, and theatre director

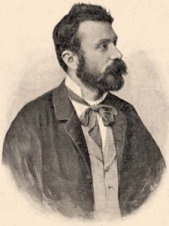
Jenő Rákosi

Jenő Rákosi (born Jenő Kremsner; 12 November 1842, Acsád, Kingdom of Hungary – 8 February 1929, Budapest, Hungary) was a Hungarian writer, journalist, editor, and theater director. He was a member of the House of Magnates and the Kisfaludy Society, corresponding member of the Hungarian Academy of Sciences and honorary member of the Petőfi Association.

His family includes doctor Béla Rákosi, writer Viktor Rákosi, and actress Szidi Rákosi.

== Life ==
He was the son of János Kremsner and Anna Vogel, who were Danube Swabians. His father previously lived in the villages of Ukk and Dabronc (Ötvöspuszta), where he was a steward of the Szegedy family with a small estate of his own. His family changed their name to Rákosi in 1867. By the 1850s, the family had settled in the village of Türje, where his childhood home had a plaque installed by the Danubian Cultural Association in 1942.

Rákosi went to school first in Sárvár, then in Kőszeg, from where he was accepted into a Benedictine Roman Catholic high school in Sopron. There, he was taught by Jeromos Lóskay and Flórián Hollósy and, under the pressure of Hungarian political movements, formed a self-study circle with like-minded students, initially in German, but from 1859, entirely in Hungarian. Here he mainly wrote short stories, but later also started penning plays. During his high school years, Rákosi's parents took him to Graz and introduced him to the German theatre scene. He was so impressed by a piece from Birchpfeifer that, upon returning home, he tried to reproduce it, translating to Hungarian from memory, and using tree branches to recreate the decorations.

By the autumn of 1860, Rákosi's father—who had nine living children at the time—was impoverished due to a series of misfortunes. To ease the family's burdens, Jenő's schooling was interrupted and he was sent to Count János Zichy's estate in Lengyeltóti, Somogy County, where he became the tutor of steward József Perlaky's children, while at the same time being himself mentored in under-stewardship. His penchant for penmanship began to manifest in earnest during this time, and he wrote and directed minor plays for various occasions.

Rákosi moved to Öreglak in 1862, where he spent a year as a clerk at József Jankovich's estate before finally giving up on pursuing a rural career. In June 1863, he went to Pest, where former classmate János Hérics convinced Rákosi to continue his studies. After some struggle, he was granted an opportunity to finish high school and graduate from Sopron despite his missed years. He started learning French and English, and he enrolled to study law at the university. To sustain himself, he interned with lawyers and took on work as a private teacher.

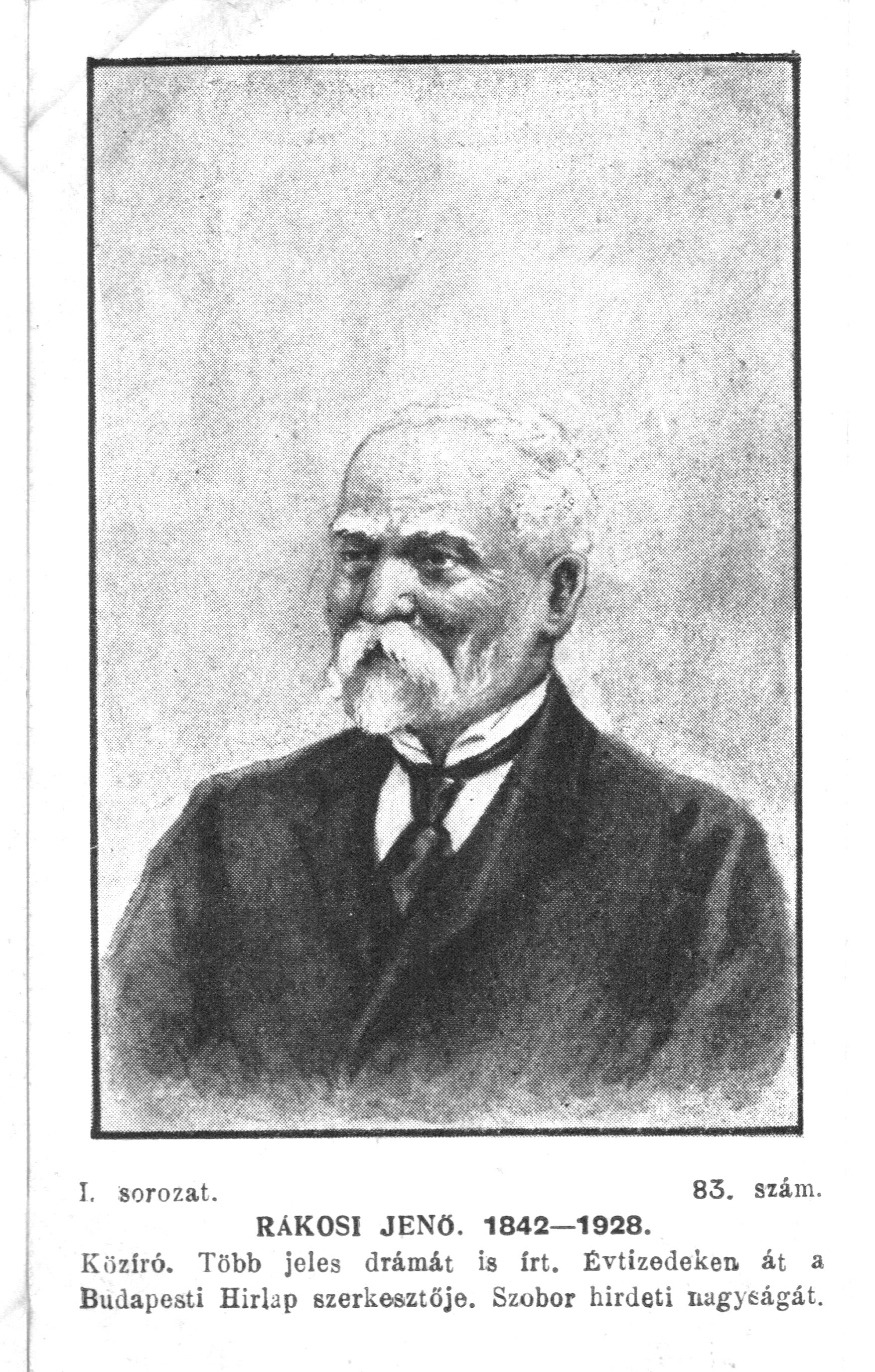
Jenő Rákosi in a card series

In the first half of 1864, he wrote a drama about Ladislaus the Posthumous in the second half of Aesop's tales. On 14 October 1866 he took his first staged romantic drama at the National Theatre (released a day earlier in Győr) and had a definite success. The young writer was a pioneer of the Hungarian drama and appeared with close friends. He soon took to literature and public life's sights.

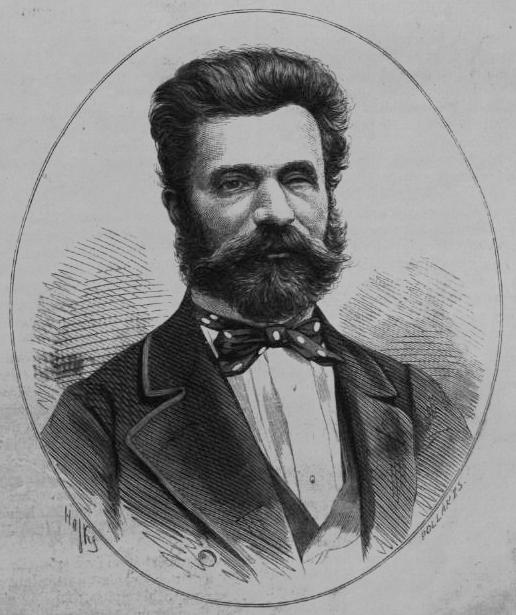
Jenő Rákosi's portrait in the Vasárnapi Ujság

In March 1867 the Pesti Napló entered superannuation, of which the Deák party was part of. Baron Zsigmond Kemény called his board colleague who had cancer in the past with pieces of old glories by critics of the academy, not so much in order to be employed, but as more to provide for writing plays of his financial problems independent of the situation, as such, Rákosi became a journalist. The Pesti Napló took the box "Vienna Things" of the successor forthwith Ferenc Salamon. The box brochure and the polemical articles were fought in a compromise with the lively, current style, which was very popular in the assigned box. A few months later, he received a special honor award for working hard on editorials. He was also a large part of the founding of Borsszem Jankó on 5 January 1868, where the Hungarian-scribe poems, at one time, were very much in demand. Although he had been a very active journalist, in literature not been unfaithful. He dealt with translations of Shakespeare's works into Hungarian and four of the Hungarian Shakespeare translation was published in the Kisfaludy company, such as The Merry Wives of Windsor, As You Like It, and Cymbeline.

In 1869, the Kisfaludy Society chose, among its members, his poem Szép Ilonka as an exemplary act of a dramatic poem.

After the end of 1869 and the merger between the Pesti Napló and Századunk, Rákosi left as editor and, with Mór Ráth, on 15 December 1869, they founded the Reform and was independently until 16 June 1875, when the Reform went into a pro-Deák party sentiment, and was grouped with talented young writers at the time, most notably Márkus István and István Toldy, but others were present. After the fall of the Deák party, the sheet was disbanded and reduced to Urváry beleolvasztotta and the Pesti Napló. Rákosi left the Pesti Napló to ministerial writers whom, however, did not deal with politics.

Drama Writing in his career Gergely Csiky (later parallels) while constantly been on the rise before. At the time, it was made for the establishment of the People's Theatre and Rákosi made a great deal; the idea was brought and served the final stage; He became collector, manager, clerk of the committee and was qualified as a theatre director. He undertook the ad without an invitation, in 1875 the institute received annual wage of 10,000 HUF. He organized a troupe of folk plays and works, and operettas and cultural attractions. The German theatre was weakened by the better performance of the contract and by the Société des Auteurs et Compositeurs Dramatiques Parisian troupe concluded that all Paris successful piece of storytelling right to Budapest secured for the People's Theatre. In 1881, he was headed to the theater and during this time was not only a director but also a director, translator, recasting it.

In 1881, the Pesti Napló became divided when József Csukássy, along with more particularly those of the editorial board, called Rákosi to base the Budapesti Hírlap on 15 June 1881. After the establishment of the political newspaper, József had cancer and after his death on 27 May 1891 Ferenc Csajthay became editor of the paper, while the editor in chief and publisher was Rákosi. It soon became one of the most often read in public goods; A political party affiliation was not present in the paper, especially with the idea of national service. Rákosi wrote most of the editorials and determined the direction. Rákosi worked for the Budapesti Hírlap for forty years, where he was editor in chief and constant contributor. Its purpose was, as he writes: "All this advocacy and support, which serves the cause of Hungarians in any field or respect for life." The board of reconciliation was on the side, but advocated the extension of national rights.

On several occasions, he was a notable factor on the political public opinion. He had a confidential and intimate relationship with Publikumával, a sign of the immediate impact of a public purpose by collecting notable amounts could be raised. In the 1890s, he considerably extended his business ventures; he founded the newspaper Fashion, the Children's fashion and lingerie Laundry by fashion magazine, and by the end of 1896 created the Evening Newspaper.

On 5 May 1892, the Hungarian Academy of Sciences elected him as a corresponding member. On 10 November 1896, Rákosi was granted nobility with the particle "mindszenti", and he became a member of the House of Magnates on 1 January 1903.

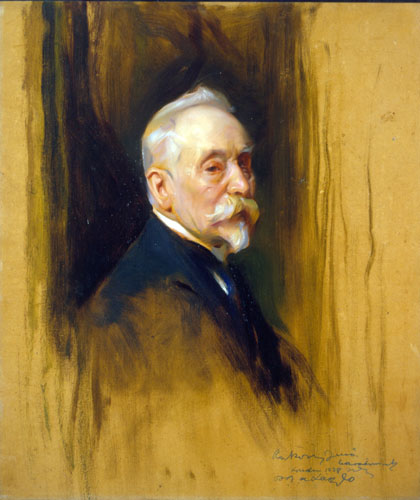
Portrait by Philip de László, 1897

Rákosi was part of the folk play development. He discovered and engaged the prematurely deceased Ferenc Csepreghy, whose works were published in 1881. Rákosi's career had later fallen, and worked as an editorial writer and editor, where he was generally polemical and was more in the foreground of newspaper writing; literary work of great importance as well. In addition to his pen, he had an upscale taste characterized by a fanatical cult of national direction. The Hungarian made famous to work in the field and spelling reform. He was the founder and worked on the evolution of Hungarian literature. He was the president of the scope of the Home of writers and newspaper writers; he assisted in the metropolitan newspaper publishing, of which he was also president of the Association. He was the second president of the association of cultural and national associations of the national council in Pannonia, he was vice president of the Urania Association of Science, an elected member of the national council of museums and libraries, and was appointed by the government members of the Elizabeth Memorial National Committee; Finally, he was a member of the Copyright 1884. XVI. Budapest constant expert committee formed pursuant to § 31 of the Act. The newspaper writers participated in the congresses in 1896 and the national memorial statues and tablets unveiling ceremony held commemorative speeches in Szombathely, Fürged, Győr, Sopron, Komárom, Budapest, Kaposvár, Pozsony, Kolozsvár, Arad, Zombor, Szeged, Debrecen, and Besztercebány.

Rákosi conducted a plethora of wide-ranging organizational work, in addition to operetta texts in Hungarian and historical dramas. In addition to folk dramas, he also wrote high-level entertainment, being a public recruiter from the Hungarian theater collusion.

Rákosi was rejected by universal suffrage from the introduction of left-wing demand for the country's peace and territorial integrity that feared him. He had done much more to be part of the Hungarian language newspaper. He also played a major role in the so-called Bukovina Székelys of the Lower Danube resettlement, organised by the Csángó installation. The language of the nation and their loyalty was important in the campaign, not the origin.

He intended to achieve the preservation of the constitutional rights and culture of the Hungarian country. His dream was shared by the thought of the thirty million Hungarian Hungarian Empire, which saw Slavs as posing a threat to Europe, and against the German overweight against forces which have been reported.

On 13 August 1907, his mother died.

In the early 20th century, he supported Apponyi's coalition supported and held Count with István Tisza: as an officer, he did not want the First World War to happen, but after the Kingdom of Hungary got involved, he encouraged it because he saw that the existence of the country was at stake. He was opposed by Endre Ady, and this questionable connection had become particularly fierce. At this point, his literature did not approve of the Western political stance, and some authors questioned the morality of Western literature and portrayed samples of excessive imitation.

In the 1920s, he was one of the vanguards of the Revisionist movement in Hungary. His works appeared in 1912 in 12 volumes.

In the 1920s, in the aftermath of the Treaty of Trianon, Rákosi, with the nation and the rule of law, defended the radical left and anti-Hungarian protestors, both for equal rights and in response to the questions the radical right side was facing. It was considered vital for the changing frontiers of Trianon, of which he worked on until his death. At the age of 87, in 1926, he wrote memoirs which foresaw the approaching of World War II, and assessed the reasons leading to it. In July 1928 in London and in September 1928 in Venice, he discussed these memoirs with Lord Rothermere, as Mussolini was becoming a more present force in Italy.

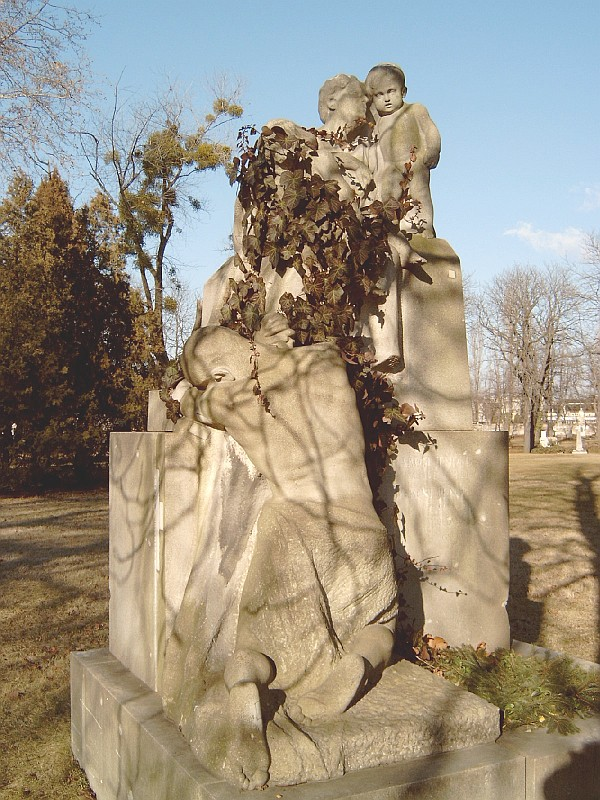
Jenő Rákosi's tombstone in Budapest's Kerepesi cemetery, created in 1966 by János Horvay.

On 8 February 1929, after recording, he died. He was put to rest two days later on February 10, 1929 at the Kerepesi cemetery.

Shortly after his death, on 17 February, Lord Rothermere offered his own condolences, where he creates a drawn memorial of Rákosi. A statue of him was inaugurated 30 November 1930. The editor of the Daily Mail, Rothermere wrote this tribute in front of Jenő Rákosi's work. "Since [the] recorded history of mankind, there has [never] been a fairer deal as the Hungarian national emergency."

== Legacy ==
After his death, only two of five space and a street named after him in Budapest. Harold Harmsworth dedicated a bronze statue to him on the corner of Erzsébet Boulevard and Dohány Street Square, and another work dedicated by Zsigmond Strobl. His birthplace of Acsád had become almost a place of pilgrimage. In 1945, however, after the Soviet takeover of Hungary, the statue in Budapest was removed and melted down in 1948, and now is replaced by a statue of a faun. The Hungarian regime change has not provided the truth behind his works, despite the fact that several major public and intellectual coterie could keep track among his predecessors. An extensive oeuvre, however, is mostly totally unknown, and is nuanced today, so therefore it is not yet possible, but people have found distorted simplifications of his works for research.

Other tributes include:

- Aladár Schöpflin on Jenő Rákosi's death, Nyugat, No. 4 1929. 4 quoted as follows: "The popularity of [Rákosi is] almost unprecedented, comparable to that of Kossuth, with writing being the university of expression."
- Gyula Juhász's words about Rákosi (in Hungarian):

Szép ifjúságom, mikor, büszke tornán
Ellenfelünk volt Rákosi Jenő,
Vad verseinket rendre kaszabolván
Küzdött vitézül és keményen ő.

A harcban mind a két fél győzedelme
A magyarság dús nyeresége lett:
A csillagok közt trónol Ady Endre
S Rákosi itt áll mindnyájunk felett!

Ma is verekszem néha, ímmel, ámmal,
De méltó ellen oly ritkán akad,
Csahos ebekre mért vinnék hadat?

Inkább az éghez fordulok imámmal,
Hogy a nagy, végső diadal előtt
El ne bocsássa Rákosi Jenőt!

- The town of Makó also gave Rákosi honorary citizenship for his work.
