= Zádor =

Zádor or Zador may refer to:

== Places ==
- Zádor, Hungary, a village in Hungary
- Zádor, Slovakia, a village in Slovakia

== People ==
- Zádor (surname), a list of people
