= Béla Rákosi =

Béla Rákosi (born Béla Kremsner; 1841, Acsád, Kingdom of Hungary) was a Hungarian physician, surgeon, and police doctor. He was the brother of Jenő, Viktor, and Szidi Rákosi.

== Life ==
Rákosi was born in Acsád, where his father (who, in 1867, changed his family name to Rákosi, children included) was a steward of the Szegedy family. Rákosi studied medical sciences at Vienna University and had earned his medical doctorate there in 1864. He was the county doctor in Gyergyószentmiklós, as well as an assistant doctor at the Lipótmező mental asylum. Later, he was the state penitentiary's physician in Vác, and a police doctor and member of the Royal Society of Physicians in Budapest.

He wrote articles for the Jogtudományi Közlöny and Gyógyászat journals, as well as the newspapers Nemzeti Hírlap, Reform and Budapesti Hírlap. He translated works from Richard von Krafft-Ebing, Theodor Billroth, and Michael Joseph Rossbach into Hungarian, and wrote a presentation about nutrition in the penal system for the Association of Hungarian Lawyers, which was later published as an issue of their periodical Magyar Jogászegyleti Értekezések.

== Works ==
- (1876) A bűnügyi lélektan alapvonalai. A német birodalom büntető törvénykönyv alapjára fektetve orvosok és jogászok számára. ("Fundamentals of forensic psychology. On the foundations of criminal law in the German Empire for doctors and lawyers.") (written by Richard von Krafft-Ebing)
- (1882) A betegápolás otthon és a kórházban. Kézikönyv családok és betegápolónők számára. ("Healthcare in the home and the hospital. A handbook for families and nurses.") (written by Theodor Billroth)
- (1883) A természettani gyógyrendszerek tankönyve orvosok és orvostanulók számára. ("Textbook of natural healing methods for physicians and students.") (written by Michael Joseph Rossbach)
