= Viktor Rákosi =

Hungarian politician and writer (1860–1923)

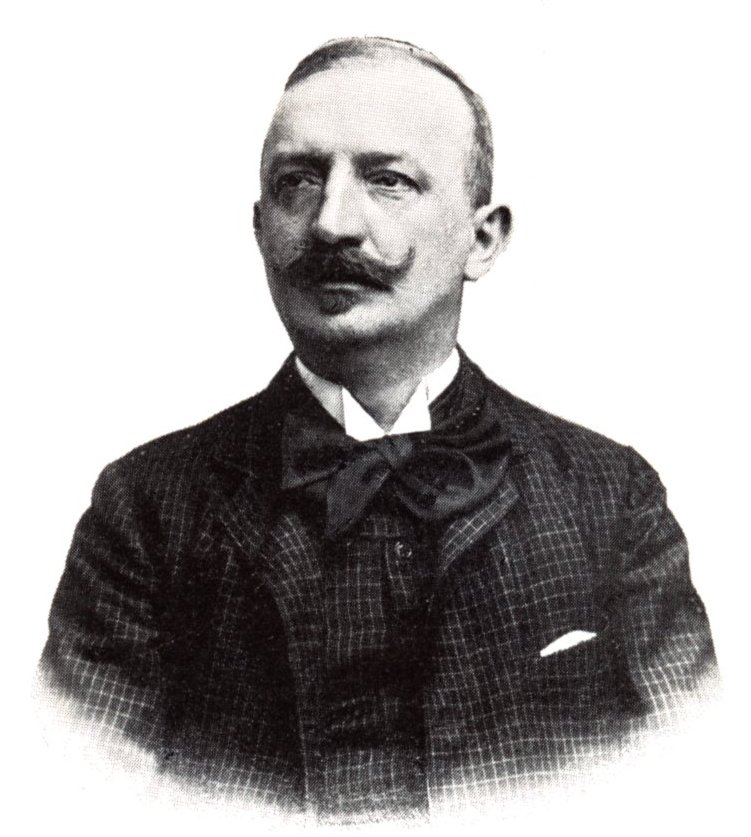
Viktor Rákosi

Viktor Rákosi, also known under his pseudonym Sipulusz (born Viktor Kremsner; 20 September 1860, in Ukk – 15 September 1923, in Budapest), was a Hungarian writer, journalist, humorist, member of parliament, and sport leader. His siblings include actor Szidi Rákosi and fellow writer Jenő Rákosi.

== Life ==
Rákosi was born in the village of Ukk in Veszprém County to a landowning family. He was the child of János Kremsner (whose family name changed to Rákosi, children included, in 1867) and Anna Vogel. In 1862, the family deteriorated as a result of the agricultural crisis. They were then in Gyergyóditró, Transylvania, brought up his brother Béla Rákosi, who was a doctor, and then in 1871 in Budapest, studied at the Piarista Gymnasium. As a journalist, he worked first for the Nemzeti Hírlap, and then the Pesti Hírlap, of which his columns appeared in writings in 1881 with his brother, Jenő, and became an intern at the Budapesti Hírlap. In 1894, he was an editor for the newspaper of Márton Kakas. In 1887 and 1891, he became a member of the Petőfi Company, and the Kisfaludy Society, respectively.

The 1896 election was first launched in the Independence Party with forty-eight delegations, but Rákosi did not get into the legislature. In the following 1901 elections, however, he does. He was re-elected in the 1905 and 1906 elections. He joined the Gyula Justh faction of the party, and when they left with Justh and founded his own party in 1909, became a member of the Rákosi "Justh party". The 1910 elections saw him as the candidate of this party's parliamentary mandate again. He represented the Hajdúnánás district.

In 1902, for a short period of time, he was the president of the Hungarian Football Federation. From 1911 to 1923 until his death, he suffered from paralysis. His novel Elnémult harangok would be adapted by Márton Garas and Béla Balogh in 1916 and in 1922 a film adaptation was made.

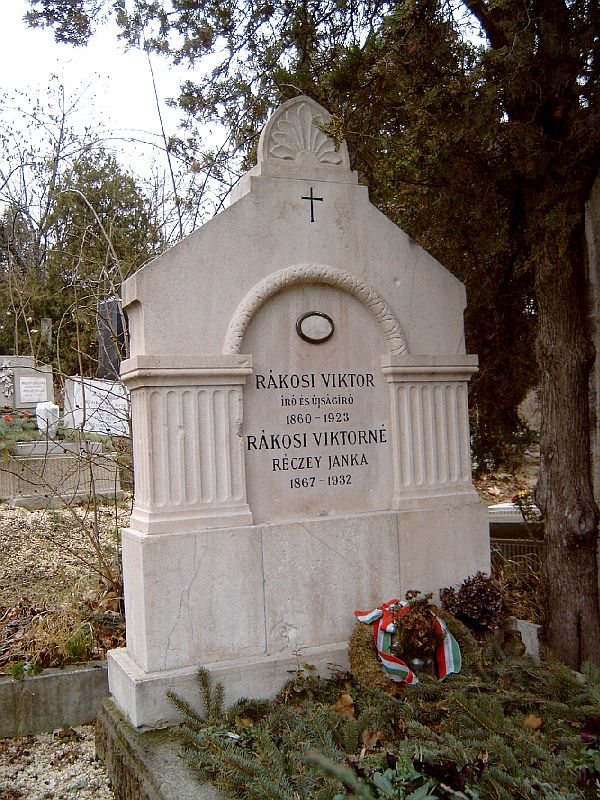
Rákosi's tombstone Farkasréti Cemetery in Budapest. 49/5–1–3

== Bibliography ==
- Verőfény Elbeszélések, rajzok, Budapest, 1886.
- A bujtogatók, regény, Budapest, 1886. A regény szövege a Magyar Elektronikus Könyvtárban
- Sipulusz tárczái, Budapest, 1891.
- Egy falusi Hamlet, regény. Budapest, 1891.
- Rejtett fészkek, elbeszélések, Budapest, 1892.
- Fohász Kossuth Lajos 100-ik születésnapjára 1902. szept. 19-re az orsz. független és 48-as párt megbízásából, Budapest
- Téli rege, regény, Budapest, 1893.
- Zuboly, Gyalu és társai, Budapest, 1894.
- Barnabás rabsága és egyéb elbeszélések, Budapest, 1896.
- Humoreszkek, Budapest, 1897.
- Polgárháború, Budapest 1897.
- Aranylakodalom Látványos színmű nyolcz képben, énekkel és tánczczal, Budapest, 1898.
- Ujabb humoreszkek, Budapest, 1897 és 1899.

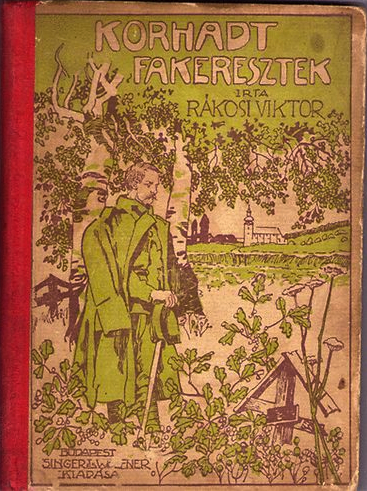
The 1913 edition of the short stories written by Rákosi

- Korhadt fakeresztek. Képek a magyar szabadságharcból, Budapest, 1899, Ifjúsági kiadás – Budapest, 1904. A novellák szövege a Magyar Elektronikus Könyvtárban
- Hős fiúk Regényes történet a szabadságharczból A magyar ifjúság számára, Budapest, 1900.
- Tartalékos férj, eredeti bohózat 3 felvonásban, Budapest, 1901.
- A sasok, vígjáték 3 felvonásban, Budapest, 1901.
- A brezováczi hős, eredeti bohózat 3 felvonásban, Budapest, 1902.
- Egy tutaj története Az ifjúság számára, Budapest, 1904.
- Elnémult harangok, regény, Budapest, Révai Testvérek, 1903. A regény szövege a Magyar Elektronikus Könyvtárban Legeza Ilona könyvismertetője
- Kiárendált urak, regény, Budapest, 1908.
- Kexholmi Mária. Lampel R. könyvkiadó vállalat, 1908.
- A buzsáki királyság, regény, Budapest, 1909.
- A párisi gyujtogatók. A kommün története/Regényes korrajz, regény, Budapest, Franklin Társulat, 1911.
- A bécsi diákok. Regény az ifjúság számára. Budapest, 1911.
- Magyar Iliász, regény, Budapest, Révai Testvérek, 1922.
- Boldog idők, boldog emberek, regény, Budapest, Légrády, 1923.

== More information ==
- Életrajza az 1910-1918-as országgyűlés almanachjában
- A magyar irodalom arcképcsarnoka
- Schöpflin Aladár: Rákosi Viktor, Nyugat · / · 1922 · / · 1922. 17–18. szám
- Ignotus: Rákosi Viktor NYUGAT / 1923. 19. szám
- Humorlexikon Szerkesztő: Kaposy Miklós (Tarsoly Kiadó – 2001; ISBN 963-86162-3-7 )
- Sírja a Farkasréti temetőben
