= Klette =

Klette is a surname of German origin. Notable people with the surname include:

- Daniela Klette (born 1958), German left-wing militant
- Immanuel J. Klette (1918–1988), American bomber pilot and squadron commander
- Jon Klette (1962–2016), Norwegian jazz musician, alto saxophone player, composer and record producer
- Károly Klette (1793–1874), Hungarian court painter and graphic artist
- Leif Klette (1927–2017), Norwegian fencer
