= Zádor (surname) =

Zádor or Zador is a Hungarian surname. Notable people with the surname include:

- Anna Zádor (1904–1995), Hungarian historian
- Anthony Zador, American neuroscientist
- Ervin Zádor (1934–2012), Hungarian water polo player
- Eugene Zador (1894–1977), Hungarian and American composer
- György Zádor (1799–1866), Hungarian jurist and writer of the Austrian Empire
- IIona Zádor, Hungarian table tennis player
- Tibor Zádor, Hungarian diplomat
