= Kálmán Csathó =

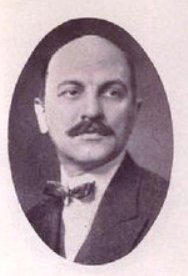
Kálmán Csathó

Kálmán Csathó (13 October 1881, Budapest – 14 February 1964, Budapest) was a Hungarian writer, theater director, and member of the Hungarian Academy of Sciences from 1933 to 1949 and vice-president of the Kisfaludy Society. He was also married to actress Ilona Aczél.

== Career ==
He graduated with a degree in law in Budapest, and studied theater in Berlin. When he returned to Hungary in 1906, he worked as a clerk in the ministry of culture. He went on a study tour on a state scholarship to Paris, then from 1909 in Budapest, worked first as a director at the National Theatre, then from 1919 onward as its chief director. In 1936, he was the vice-president of the Kisfaludy Society. In 1940, he became the director of the Magyar Theatre and the Andrássy Street Theatre. He was a corresponding member of the Hungarian Academy of Sciences between 1933 and 1949, and in 1989, his membership was reinstated posthumously.

== Death ==
He was buried in Farkasréti Cemetery.

== Works ==
- A varjú a toronyórán (1916)
- Te csak pipálj, Ladányi (1916)
- Juliska néni (1918)
- Ibolyka/Pókháló (1920)
- Mikor az öregek fiatalok voltak (1921)
- Földiekkel játszó égi tünemény (1924)
- Leányok, anyák, nagyanyák I-III. (1928)
- Most kél a nap (1928)
- Leányos ház 1931-ben (1931)
- Kluger és társa (1933)
- Családfa (1934)
- A szép Juhászné (1936)
- Az én lányom nem olyan (1936)
- Barátom, Bálint (1938)
- A kék táska
- A nők titka
- Maskara
- Vadászzsákmány (1940)
- A régi Nemzeti Színház (1960)
- Tavasztól tavaszig (1962)
- Írótársak között (1965)

== Plays ==
- Az új rokon (1922)
- A házasságok az égben köttetnek (1925)
- Mi van a kulisszák mögött (1926)
- Matyika színésznő szeretne lenni (1929)
- Fűszer és csemege (1938)
- Ilyeneknek láttam őket (1957)
- A régi Nemzeti Színház (1960)
- Tavasztól tavaszig (1962)
- Lilla
