= Ferenc Toldy =

Hungarian literary critic (1805–1875)

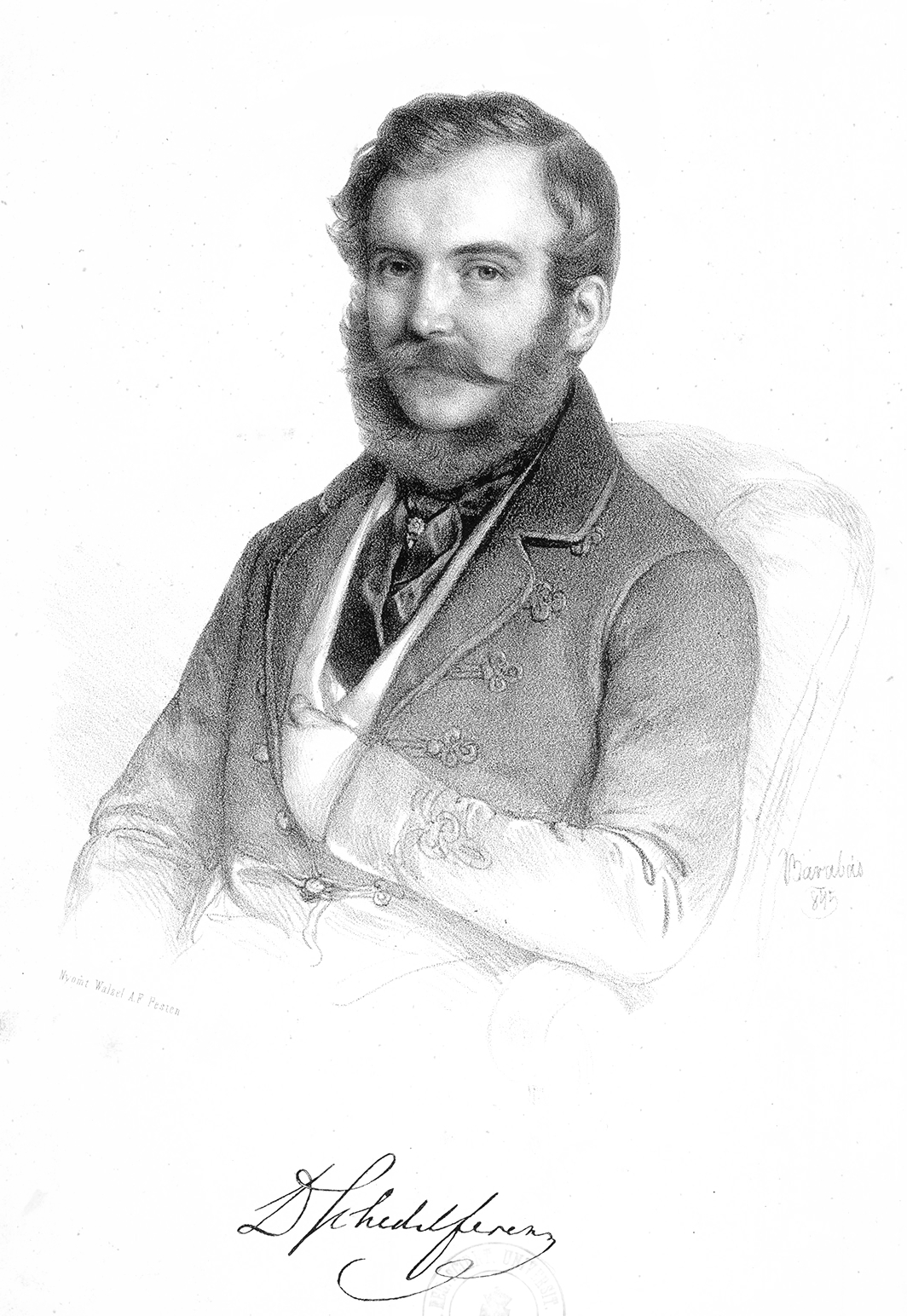
Ferenc Toldy, by Miklós Barabás (1845)

Ferenc Toldy (born Franz Karl Joseph Schedel, August 10, 1805, in Buda - December 10, 1875, in Budapest) was a literary critic from the Austrian Empire and later Austria-Hungary.

== Biography ==
As a small boy, he lived with his parents, Franz Schedel and Josepha Thalherr, in Buda. He was sent to school in Cegléd. He studied medicine and practised as a doctor in Pest, but his interest in literature absorbed his attention, and he published a handbook on Hungarian poetry in 1828. He travelled to Berlin, London, and Paris, returning in 1830. From 1833 to 1844 he was a professor of dietetics at Pest University, and in 1836 helped found the Kisfaludy Society. He changed his name to Toldy in 1846. He had used it as a pseudonym from the beginning of his career.

He had already joined the Hungarian Academy, becoming its Secretary in 1835. He remained in this role until 1861 when he was appointed Professor of Hungarian Literature. His lastingly influential works were published in the 1850s and 1860s.
