= Zsolt Beöthy =

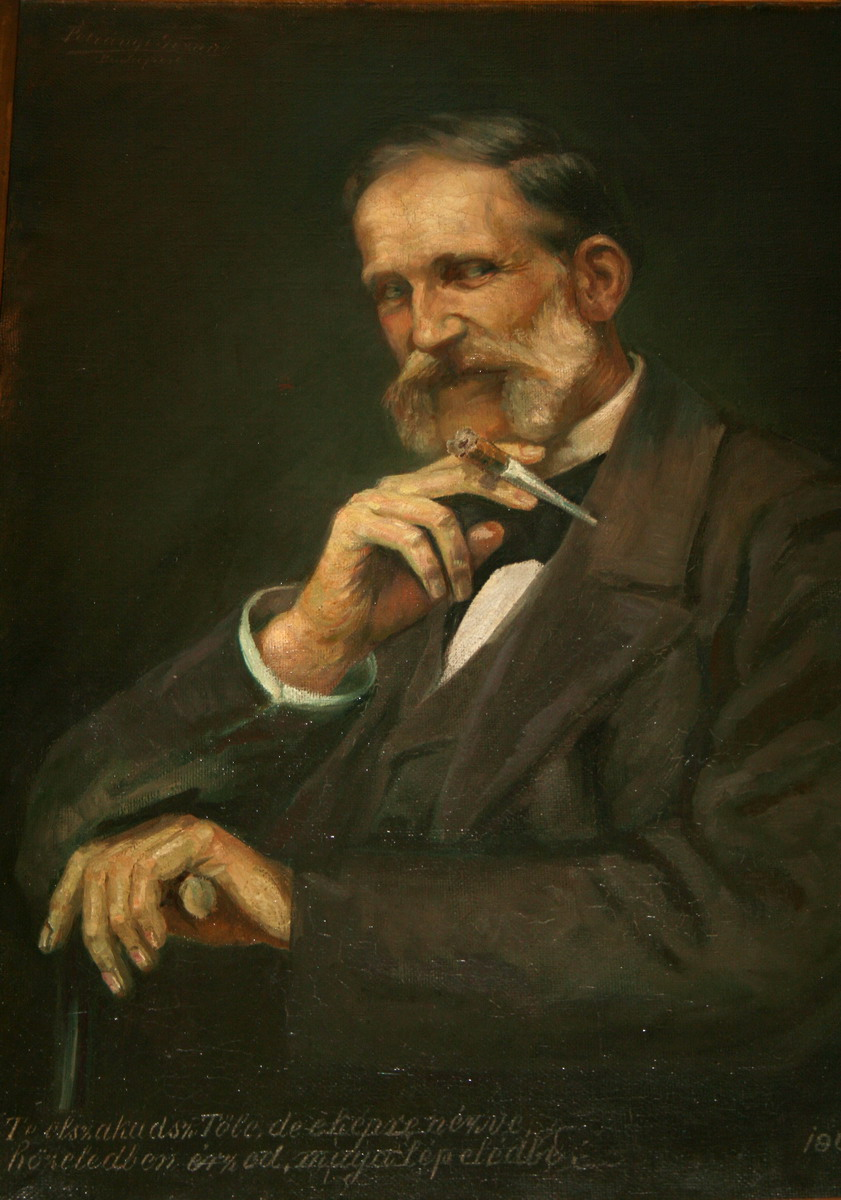
- Born: 4 September 1848; Buda
- Died: 18 April 1922 (aged 73); Budapest, Kingdom of Hungary
- Education: Pest University
- Occupations: Literary critic, literary historian, professor
- Spouse: Szidi Rákosi (m. 1872; div. 1877)
- Children: 2
- Writing career
- Language: Hungarian
- Years active: 1870–1922
- Subjects: Literature

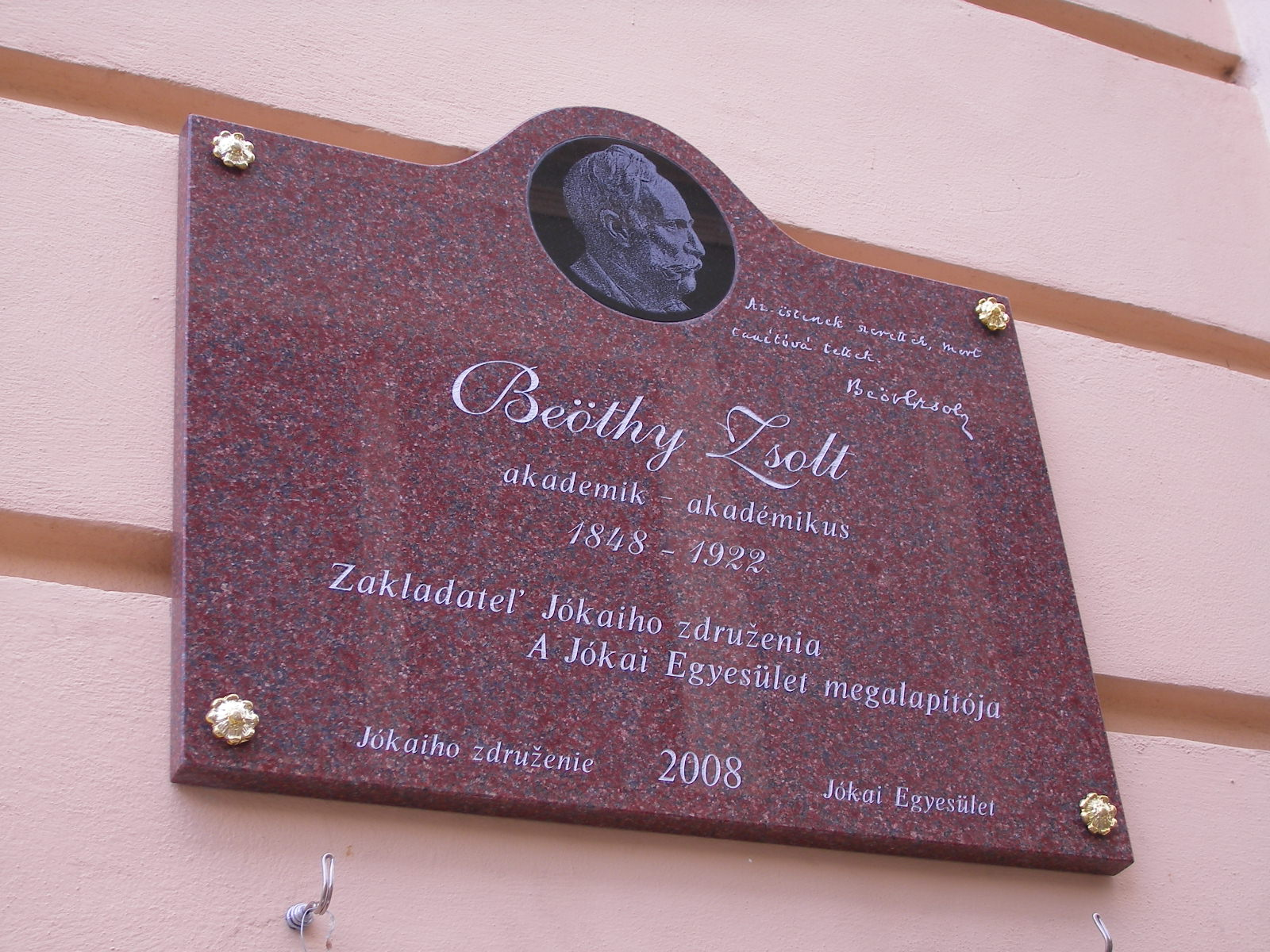
A plaque of Zsolt Beöthy at the Museum of Danube Komarno in Komárom.

Zsolt Beöthy (4 September 1848 – 18 April 1922) was a Hungarian literary historian, critic, professor, member of the Hungarian Academy of Sciences, and the secretary then chairman of Kisfaludy Society. A conservative-minded literature critic, he was one of the leading figures in Hungarian literature at the turn of the 19th century.

== Family ==
His father was Zsigmond Beöthy (1819–1896), a poet, writer and legal scholar, and his mother was Jozefa Sántha. He married Szidi Rákosi, with whom he had two children: László Beöthy (13 April 1873), and Zsigmond (1875).

== Career ==
Beöthy studied at Pest University (now Eötvös Loránd University) between 1867 and 1870, and from 1870 to 1871, he studied at the University of Vienna and the Ludwig-Maximilians-Universität München. Between 1871 and 1875, he was an official in the Ministry of Finance. In 1872, he married actress Szidi Rákosi. He then began his writing career. Between 1873 and 1874, he worked as editor at Athenaeum. In 1875, he received his teacher and doctorate in philosophy in 1877, and divorced Rákosi in the same year. He taught from the beginning at a school from 1875 to 1882 and then as a university lecturer from 1878 until his death, at universities including the University of Budapest (again, now Eötvös Loránd University). He, at one point, lectured philosopher György Lukács. From 1915 to 1916, he was rector of the university. Between 1890 and 1920, he was the president of the National Commission of Teachers in Budapest. From 1903 onward, he was a member of the House of Magnates.

== Academic career ==
- Corresponding Member (1877)
- full member (1884)
- Director (1893)
- Second president (1910–1913)

== Social activities ==
- Member of the Kisfaludy Society since 1876, secretary since 1879, and from 1900 to his death, president
- From 1893 to 1907, president of the National Association of Secondary School Teachers,
- 1911-19-ben a Magyar Irodalomtörténeti Társaság első elnöke.

== Awards ==
- Kisfaludy Társ. Greguss award (A magyar irodalom kis-tükre című művéért);
- MTA Karácsonyi award (A tragikum című művéért);
- Pro litteris et artibus emblem (1899).

== Art collection ==
After his death, his collection of Greek art has been of national significance to Sweden.

== Works ==
- Novelláskötetek
- Kálozdy Béla (regény, I-II, Bp., 1875);
- A magyar nemzeti irodalom történeti ismertetése (irodalomtörténet középiskolák számára I-II, Bp., 1877–79, 14 kiadás)
- Ráskai Lea (verses elbeszélés, Bp., 1881);
- Színműírók és színészek (Bp., 1882);
- A tragikum (Bp., 1885);
- A szépprózai elbeszélés a régi magyar irodalomban (I-II; Bp., 1886–87);
- Színházi esték (Bp., 1895);
- A magyar irodalom kis-tükre (Bp., 1896; az utolsó, 7. kiadás Kéky Lajos bevezetésével 1930-ban jelent meg):
- A művészetek története (I-III. 1905. 12. szerk.);
- Romemlékek (Tanulmányok, beszédek, cikkek, I-II, Bp.,
- (Szerk.) A magyar irodalom története (I-II, Bp., 1893–95)
