= Hermann Nothnagel =

German internist (1841–1905)

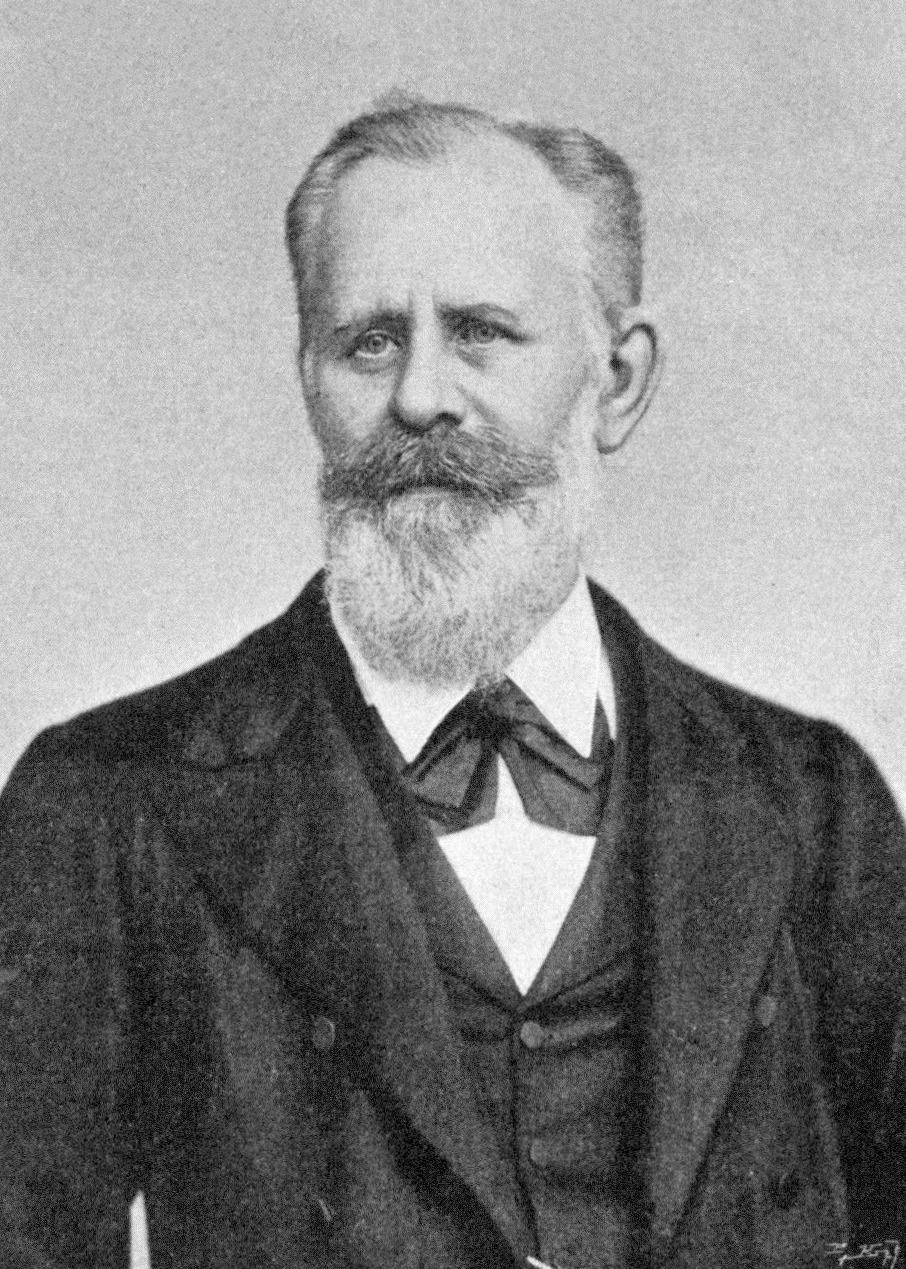
- Hermann Nothnagel in 1902
- Born: 28 September 1841; Alt-Lietzegöricke
- Died: 7 July 1905 (aged 63); Vienna
- Resting place: Matzleinsdorf Protestant Cemetery
- Medical career
- Profession: Military physician, professor
- Institutions: University of Freiburg; University of Jena; University of Vienna
- Research: Internist

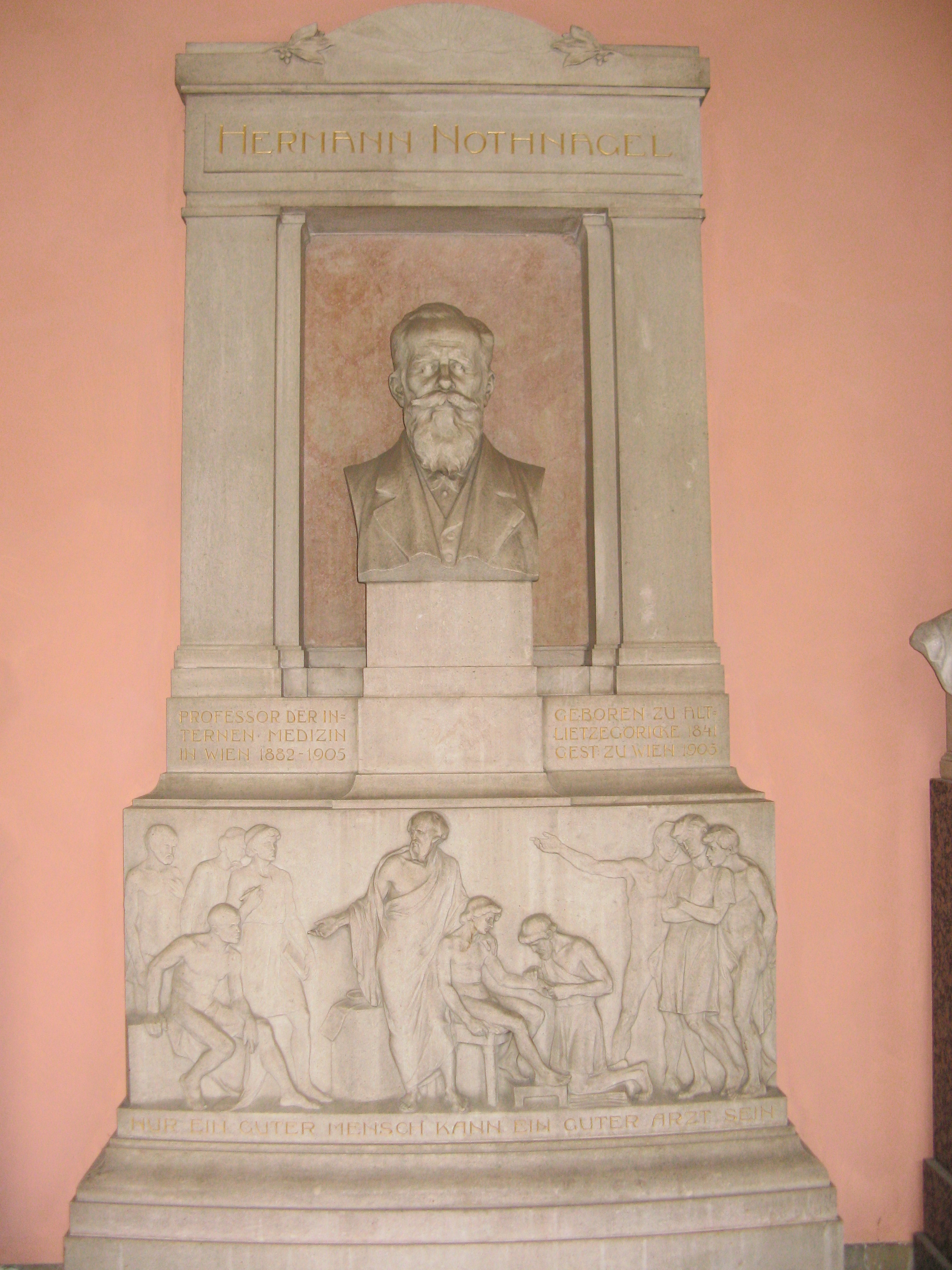
Monument to Hermann Nothnagel at the University of Vienna

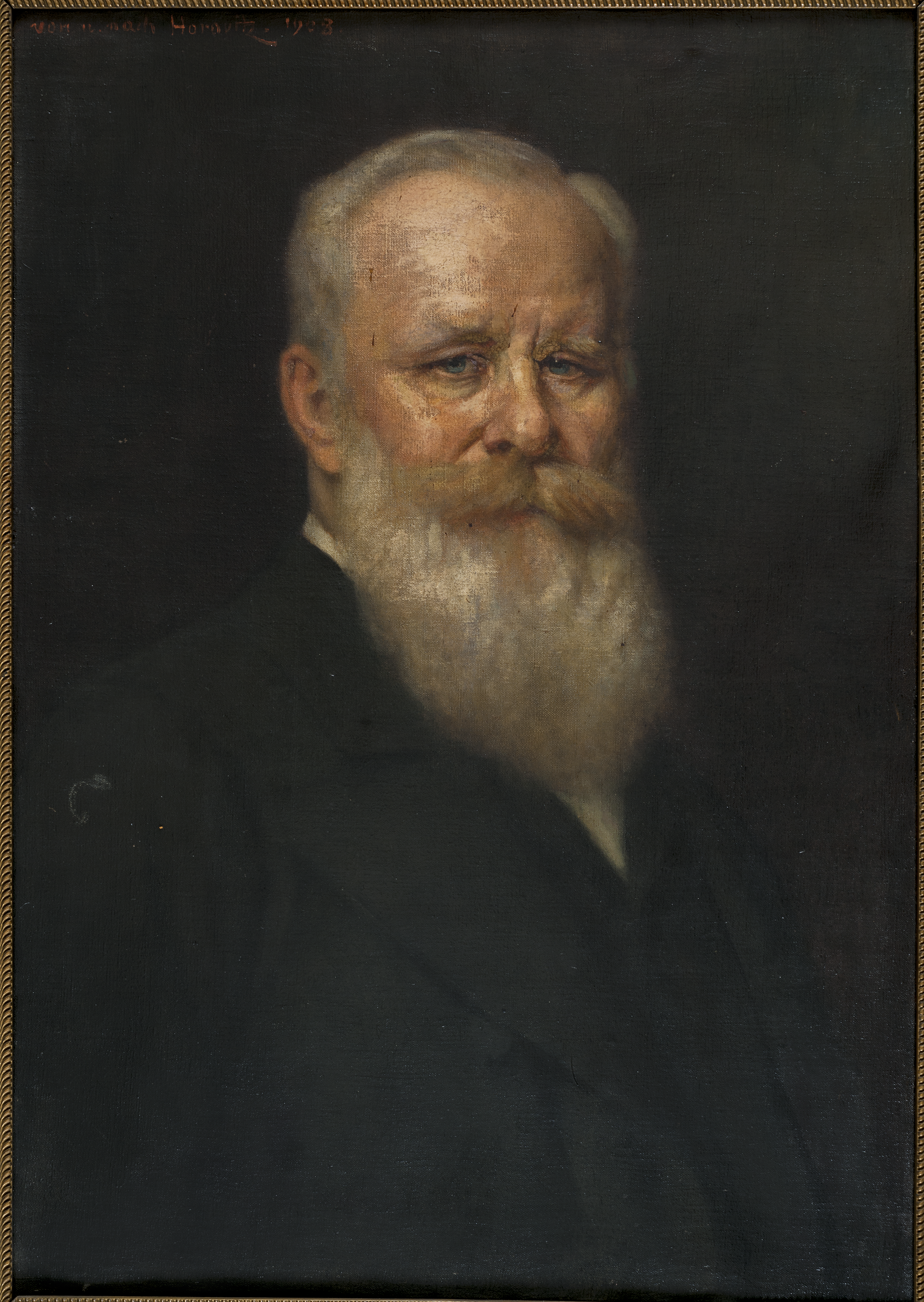
Hermann Nothnagel, oil painting by Leopold Horovitz, 1908

Carl Wilhelm Hermann Nothnagel (German: [ˈnoːtˌnaːɡl̩]; 28 September 1841 – 7 July 1905) was a German internist, born in Alt-Lietzegöricke, near Bärwalde in der Neumark, Neumark, Brandenburg.

== Career ==
The son of a pharmacist, from 1858 to 1863 Nothnagel studied under Ludwig Traube (1818–1876) and Rudolf Virchow (1821–1902) at the University of Berlin. From 1865 to 1868 he was an assistant to Ernst Viktor von Leyden (1832–1910) at the University of Königsberg where, in 1866, he was habilitated for internal medicine. From 1868 to 1870 he worked as a military physician and lecturer in Berlin and later served in the same roles at Breslau (1870–72).

In 1872 he relocated to Freiburg and in 1874 was appointed full professor at the medical clinic in Jena. From 1882 until his death in 1905, he was a professor at the university clinic in Vienna. One of his better known students was Constantin von Economo (1876–1931). In 1879 he became a member of the Deutsche Akademie der Naturforscher Leopoldina.

In 1876 he described the irregular pulse associated with atrial fibrillation. At the time he referred to this finding as "delirium cordis". The eponymous "Nothnagel's syndrome" is named after him, a disorder characterized by ipsilateral oculomotor palsy and contralateral cerebellar ataxia.

He died in Vienna. He is interred at the Matzleinsdorf Protestant Cemetery (top middle vault, No. 109). In 1922 medical historian Max Neuburger published his biography with the title "Hermann Nothnagel, Leben und Wirken eines deutschen Klinikers".

== Published works ==
In collaboration with other physicians, Nothnagel published "Specielle Pathologie und Therapie", a comprehensive 24-volume handbook of medicine. Prior editions of this work were issued by Rudolf Virchow (from 1854 to 1876) and Hugo Wilhelm von Ziemssen (from 1875 to 1885) as "Handbuch der speciellen Pathologie und Therapie".

- Handbuch der Arzneimittellehre. 1870. (Digital 4th edition from 1880 by the University and State Library Düsseldorf); with Michael Joseph Rossbach, from the 3rd edition onward.
- Über den epileptischen Anfall. (in Richard von Volkmann's Sammlung klinischer Vorträge), 1872
- Über die Diagnose und Aetiologie der einseitigen Lungenschrumpfung. (in Volkmann's Sammlung klinischer Vorträge, 1874.
- Über Neuritis in diagnostischer und pathologischer Beziehung. (in Volkmann's Sammlung klinischer Vorträge), 1876.
- Anämie und Hyperämie, Blutungen und Erweichungen des Gehirns.
- Epilepsie. (in Ziemssen's Handbuch der speciellen Pathologie und Therapie).
- Tophische Diagnostik der Gehirnkrankheiten. Eine klinische Studie. 1879.
- Die Symptomatologie der Darmgeschwüre. (in Volkmann's Sammlung klinischer Vorträge), 1881.
- Beiträge zur Physiologie und Pathologie des Darms. 1884.
- Vorträge über die Diagnose bei den Gehirnkrankheiten. 1887.
- Specielle Pathologie und Therapie. 1894–1905, 24 volumes.
- Die Erkrankungen des Darms und des Peritoneum. (in Ziemmsen's Handbuch der speciellen Pathologie und Therapie).

== See also ==
- Ernst Remak
- Ottmar Rosenbach
