= Kisfaludy Society =

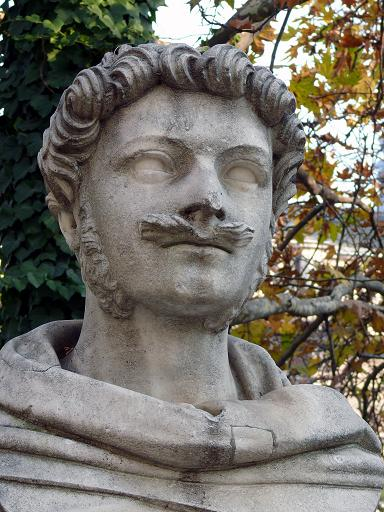
Bust of Károly Kisfaludy outside the National Museum (István Ferenczy, 1836)

The Kisfaludy Society (Hungarian: Kisfaludy Társaság) was a literary society in Pest, founded in 1836 and named after Károly Kisfaludy, who had died in 1830. It held monthly meetings and was a major force in Hungarian literary life, giving prizes, funding the collection of folk songs, and sponsoring the publication of works like Imre Madách's The Tragedy of Man. It dissolved in 1952.

== Founding members ==
- József Bajza
- László Bártfay
- Gergely Czuczor
- Aurél Dessewffy
- András Fáy
- Mihály Helmeczy
- Miklós Jósika
- Pál Kovács
- Ferenc Kölcsey
- Sándor Sík
- György Zádor (Stettner)
- József Szenvey
- Gusztáv Szontagh
- Ferenc Toldy
- Mihály Vörösmarty

== Directors ==
- András Fáy (the first director, 1837–1841)
- Ferenc Toldy (1841–1860, and from 1860 vice-chairman)
- János Arany (1860–1867, with József Eötvös as president and Pál Gregus as secretary)
- Zsigmond Kemény (1867–1876)
- Móric Lukács (1876–1879)
- Pál Gyulai (1879–1899, with Zsolt Beöthy as secretary from 1879, president 1900–1922)

== Other members ==
=== A-D ===
- Kornél Ábrányi
- Adolf Ágai
- Zoltán Ambrus
- Albert Apponyi
- János Arany
- Sándor Balázs
- István Bartalus
- Edward Dundas Butler
- Kálmán Csathó
- Antal Csengery
- Gergely Csiky
- Alajos Degré

=== E-N ===
- Gábor Egressy
- János Erdélyi
- István Fekete
- Ágost Greguss
- Ferenc Herczeg
- Mihály Horváth
- Pál Hunfalvy
- Mór Jókai
- Gusztáv Kelety
- Imre Madách
- Kálmán Mikszáth
- Ignác Nagy

=== P-V ===
- Albert Pákh
- Ede Paulay
- Ferenc Pulszky
- Jenő Rákosi
- Viktor Rákosi
- Pál Szemere
- Ede Szigligeti
- Mihály Szabolcska
- László and Sándor Teleki
- Mihály Tompa
- Ágoston Trefort
- János Vajda

== Bibliography ==
- Fischer, William: A Kisfaludy Társaság története a szabadságharcig ("The History of the Kisfaludy Society"), 1928.
- Kéky Louis: A százéves Kisfaludy Társaság ("The Kisfaludy Society Centennial"), 1936.
