= János Vajda (poet) =

Hungarian poet and journalist

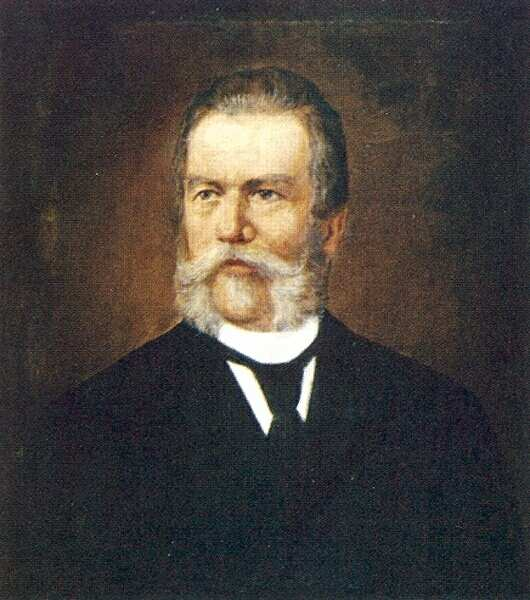
- Born: 7 May 1827; Pest, Kingdom of Hungary
- Died: 17 January 1897 (aged 69); Budapest, Austria-Hungary
- Occupations: Poet, journalist

János Vajda (7 May 1827 – 18 January 1897) was a Hungarian poet and journalist. His first poetry was published in Életképek in 1844. He was a member of the Kisfaludy Society.
