= Adolf Ágai =

Hungarian journalist, writer (1836–1916)

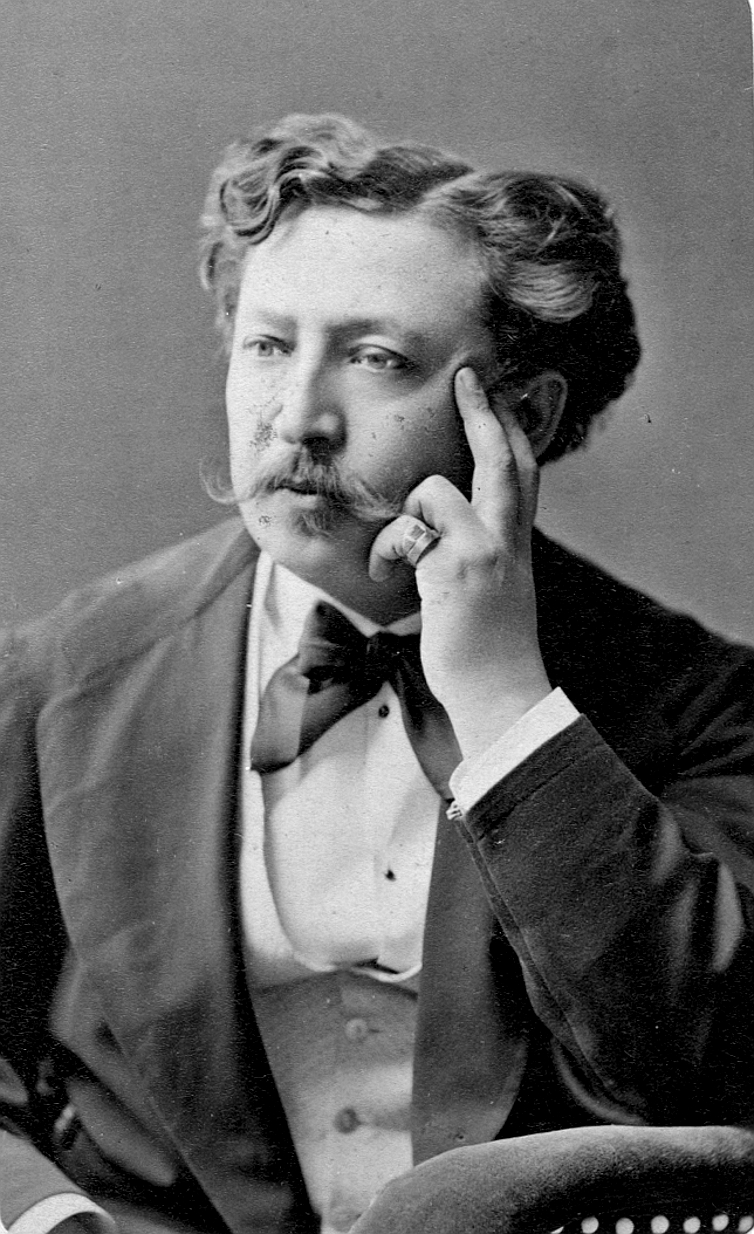
- Born: Adolf Rosenzweig; March 31, 1836; Jánoshalma, Hungary
- Died: September 16, 1916 (aged 80); Budapest, Austria-Hungary
- Writing career
- Pen name: Porzó; Forgó Bácsi
- Language: Hungarian

Adolf Ágai (né Rosenzweig; March 31, 1836 – September 16, 1916) was a Hungarian-Jewish writer and journalist.

== Biography ==
Adolf Rosenzweig was born to a Yiddish-speaking Jewish family in Jánoshalma, Hungary. His father, Joseph Rosenzweig, at the age of thirteen, had emigrated from Galicia to Hungary, where he studied medicine, became a physician, and wrote a book on asphyxia, which was ultimately published with the financial aid of the Hungarian politician Gábor Klauzál. He also translated Hungarian literature and poetry into Hebrew, including the Szózat and works by Sándor Petőfi. The family adopted the Hungarian name Ágai in 1848.

Ágai was trained as a physician in Vienna, and afterwards worked at a hospital in Budapest. His first literary production—a novel entitled Antoinette—was published in the columns of the Hölgyfutár in 1854. For this journal and for Vasárnapi Újság he wrote letters from Vienna (1854–81), and occasionally contributed to the Wanderer, Gartenlaube, and Fliegende Blätter. In 1865, under the pseudonym "Porzó," he wrote a series of spirited feuilletons, remarkable for their pathos and humour.

He abandoned medicine in 1868 to focus on writing and editing. From 1870 to 1879 he edited the Nagyvilág ('Hungary and the World'), and in 1871 founded a comic weekly, Borsszem Jankó ('Tom Thumb), of which he was editor in 1900. The humorous characters he created were well known in Hungary, especially the Jewish caricature "Seifensteiner Salamon." In 1871 Ágai undertook the editorship of the Kis Lap ('Little Magazine'), which he had founded for the youth of his country. In that journal he wrote under the pseudonym "Forgó Bácsi." His annual calendars, published under the names of the various humorous characters in his Borsszem Jankó, were widely read. Ágai was a successful lecturer, and has translated German and French books into Hungarian. He was a member of the Kisfaludy Society and also of the Hungarian-Jewish Literary Society.

== Selected publications ==
- Porzó tarca-levelei [Porzó's Feuilletons]. Budapest: Athenaeum. 1876.
- Abrincs! 150 jordány viccz. Budapest: Athenaeum. 1879. hdl:2027/hvd.hwn56h.
- Por és hamu [Dust and Ashes]. Budapest: Athenaeum. 1892. hdl:2027/nnc1.0315046095.
- Utazás Pestről Budapestre [Trip from Pest to Budapest]. Budapest: Pallas Irodalmi és Nyomdai Résvénytárság. 1912 [1908].
- Igaz tőrténetek [True Story]. Budapest. 1893.
