= Nándor Fettich =

Hungarian archaeologist and goldsmith (1900–1971)

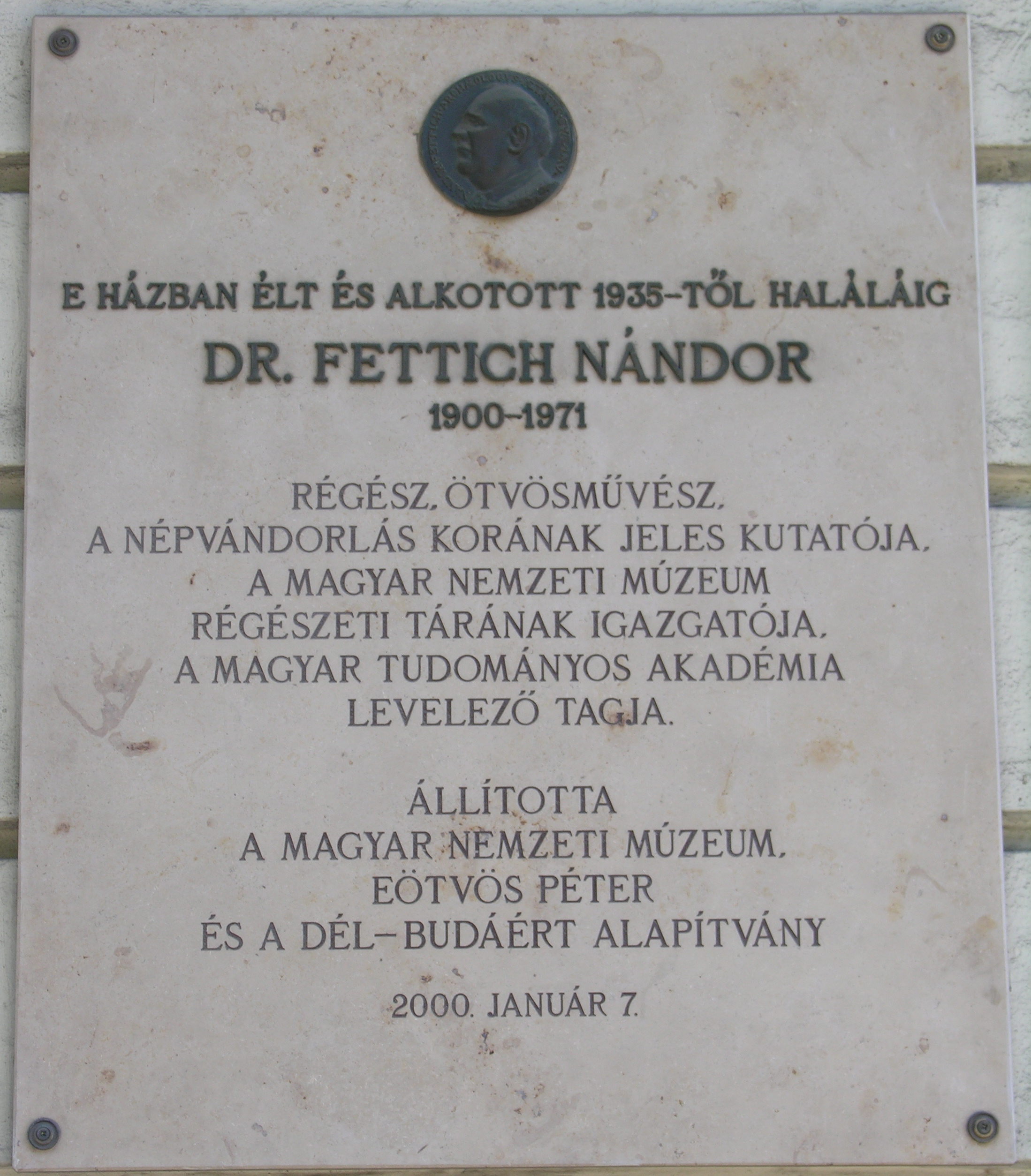
- Fettich's gravestone
- Born: 7 January 1900; Acsád, Austria-Hungary
- Died: May 17, 1971 (aged 71); Budapest, Hungary
- Occupations: archaeologist; goldsmith

Nándor Fettich (7 January 1900, – 17 May 1971) was a Hungarian archaeologist, goldsmith, and member of the Hungarian Academy of Sciences.

== Biography ==
Fettich was born on 7 January 1900 in Acsád, Austria-Hungary. He finished high school in Szombathely and Budapest. In 1921, he graduated from the Eötvös Loránd University in Budapest in a doctorate in arts, with a thesis about votive tablets in the Roman province of Pannonia. From 1921 to 1923, he was a student of the flute department of the Franz Liszt Academy of Music. He, in 1926, worked in the Hungarian National Museum for Numismatic and antiquities collection of the charge of the Migration Period. Having learned Russian, he was posted as one of the only archaeologists of the Soviet Union from 1929 to 1935. He was the founding editor of Folia Archaeology in 1939. In 1941, he was appointed as the director of the Hungarian National Museum. In 1941, he became a goldsmith. He made many history-themed reliefs. After his retirement in 1945, he became a manual laborer, but he still worked as a goldsmith. In 1956, he was the author of several scientific papers. From 1957 to his death on 17 May 1971 in Budapest, Hungary he was a member of the Creative Union of Goldsmith Artists. In 1957, he participated in Expo 58 in Brussels. From 1959 to 1962, he was a member of the Hungarian Academy of Sciences as a contractual employee of Archaeological Research Group. He was awarded the Hungarian Archaeology and History of Art Medal of the Science Society and was a member of the Helsinki Finno-Ugric Company. Fettich attended several archaeological excavations.

== Works ==
- 1926: The Avar age plastics industry in Hungary. Budapest.
- 1928: Green piles of steppe Scythian artifacts. Budapest.
- 1929: Bronzeguss und Nomadenkunst. Prague.
- 1934: garcsinovói Scythian artifacts. Budapest.
- 1935: The conquering Hungarians metalwork. Budapest.
- 1942: altungarische Die Kunst. Berlin.
- 1942: Der Fund von Čadjavica. Vjestnik hrvatskog Arheološkoga društvo NSXXII-XXIII / 1, 55–61.
- 1943: Győr story of XIII. century until the middle. Győr.
- 1943-47: Hungarian styles of Applied Arts I-III. Budapest.
- Archaeological studies in the late 1951 Hun metalwork history. Budapest.
- 1953: Szeged-Nagyszeksos Hun prince grave finding. Budapest.
- 1958: Jánoshida Avar Age cemetery. Archaeological Papers II / 1.
- 1969: Recent data of prehistoric car in the Carpathian Basin. Studia Ethnographica 2. Budapest.
- 1990: Bánhalmi litter to find. The Szolnok County Museums Yearbook VII, 123–137.

== Awards ==
- 1969: Finnish Lion Knights Knight's Cross

== Sources ==
- Magyar biographical lexicon IV: 1978-1991 (A to Z). Főszerk. Ágnes Kenyeres. Budapest: Academic. 1994. ISBN 963056422X
