= István Nagy (painter) =

Hungarian artist

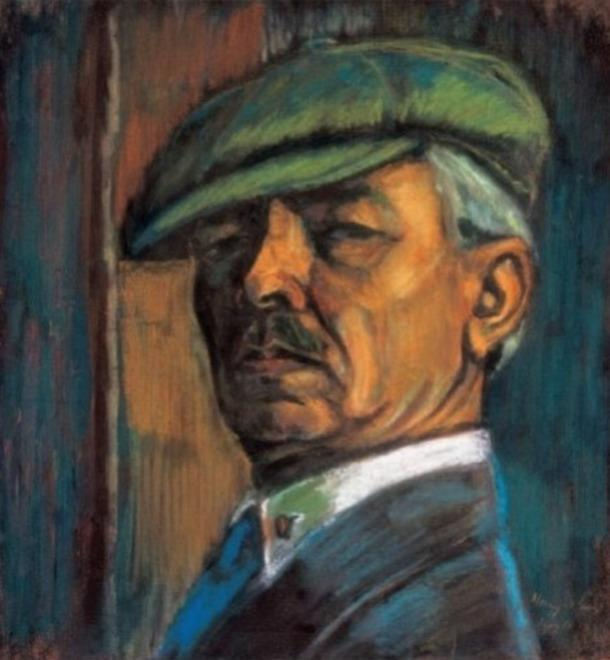
Self-portrait (1926)

István Nagy (28 March 1873 – 13 February 1937) was a Hungarian artist who specialized in landscapes and figure painting.

== Biography ==
A native of Csíkmindszent, Harghita County, Austro-Hungarian Empire, he was born into a land-owning family. Rather than take up agricultural pursuits, he attended the teacher training college in Kolozsvár and taught in Homokmégy. One of his courses involved drawing in charcoal. Discovering that he had artistic talent, and encouraged by Gusztáv Kelety, he went to study at the Hungarian University of Fine Arts in Budapest, where his primary teacher was Bertalan Székely. He also studied in Munich with Franz von Lenbach and obtained a scholarship to study at the Académie Julian in Paris. In 1902, he held his first exhibition in Csíkszereda, near his hometown. This was followed by a long period of solitude, characterized by extended sojourns for painting and drawing in the surrounding forests.

World War I brought him out again. He went to the Transylvanian and Galician fronts, where he produced bleak portraits of the soldiers. After the war, in 1919, he returned to Budapest. During the 1920s, he and József Koszta toured the Great Hungarian Plain, painting landscapes and spending time at the art colony in Kecskemét. Another exhibition in 1923 first attracted general attention to his work, including praise from the well-known writer Dezső Kosztolányi. He also was fortunate to find a wealthy patron who helped him to organize more exhibitions and sell his paintings. In 1924, he was awarded first prize in an exhibition at the "Szinyei Merse Society".

In 1930, his ill health prompted him to settle in Baja with his family. Once there, his mental and physical health began to decline. He eventually contracted cerebral myelitis and had a stroke that deprived him of his speech, but he continued to paint until almost his final day.

== Selected paintings ==
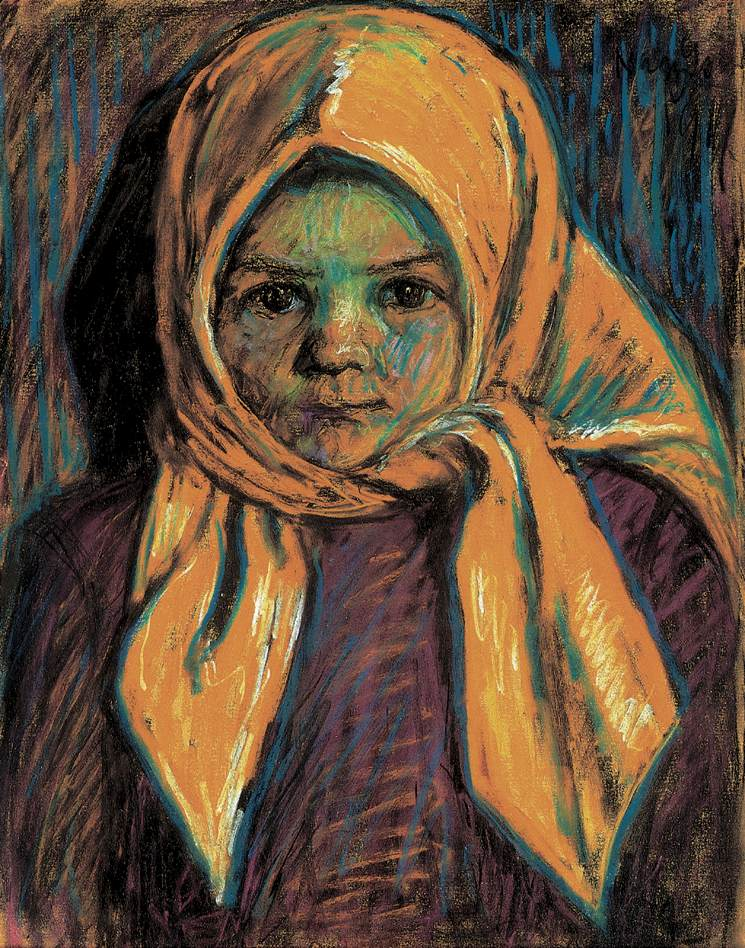
Girl with Yellow Scarf (1917)

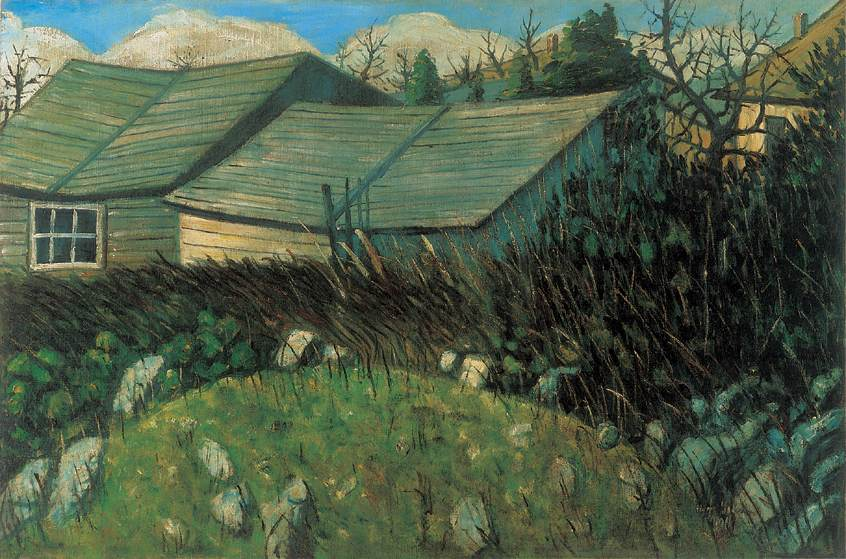
Backyard (1911)

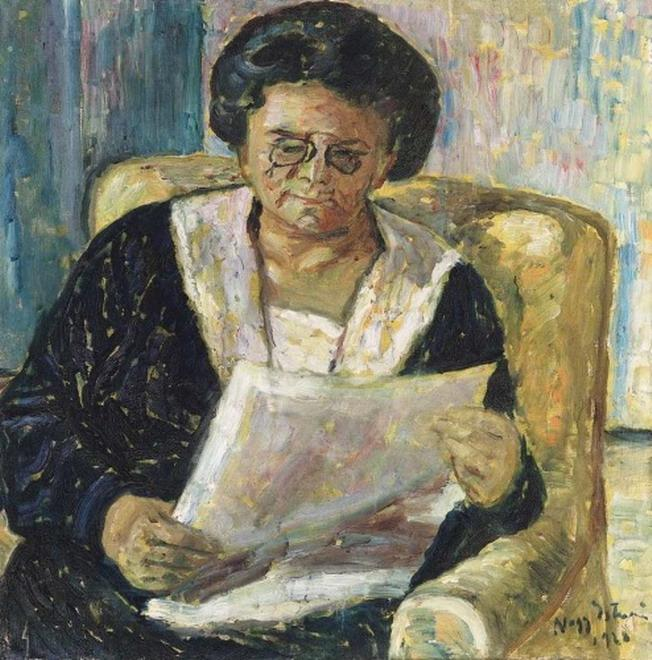
Newspaper Reader (1920)

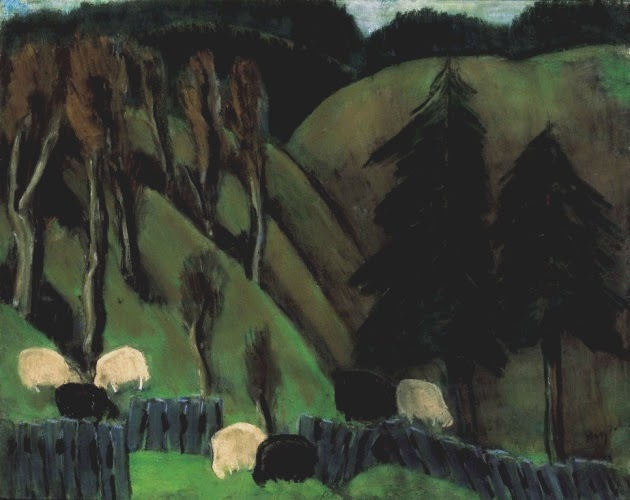
From My Homeland (Sheep, 1927)

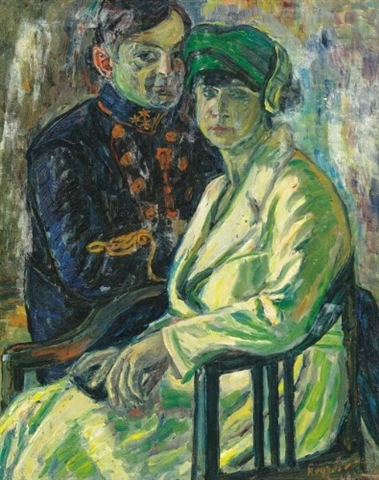
Side by Side
(date unknown)
