= Gusztáv Kelety =

Hungarian painter, graphic artist and art critic

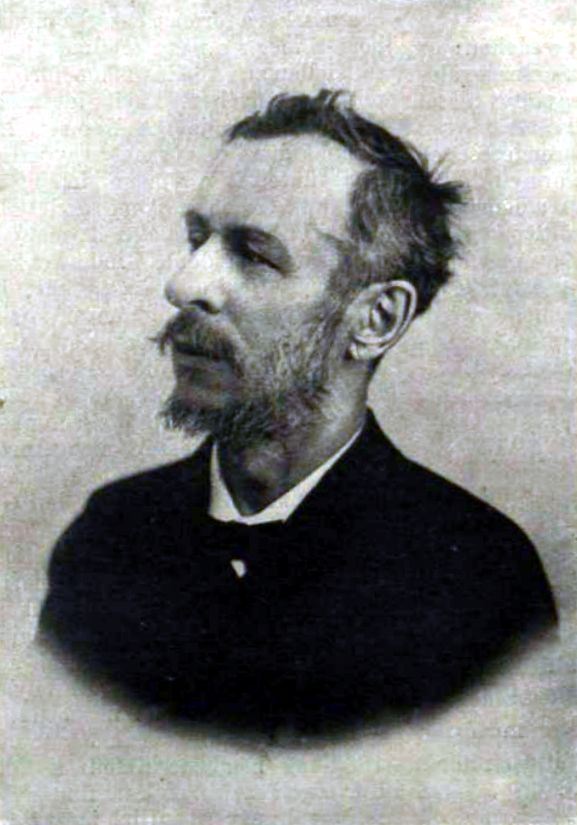
Gusztáv Kelety; photograph by Mór Erdélyi (date unknown) from Vasárnapi Ujság (The Sunday News, 1902)

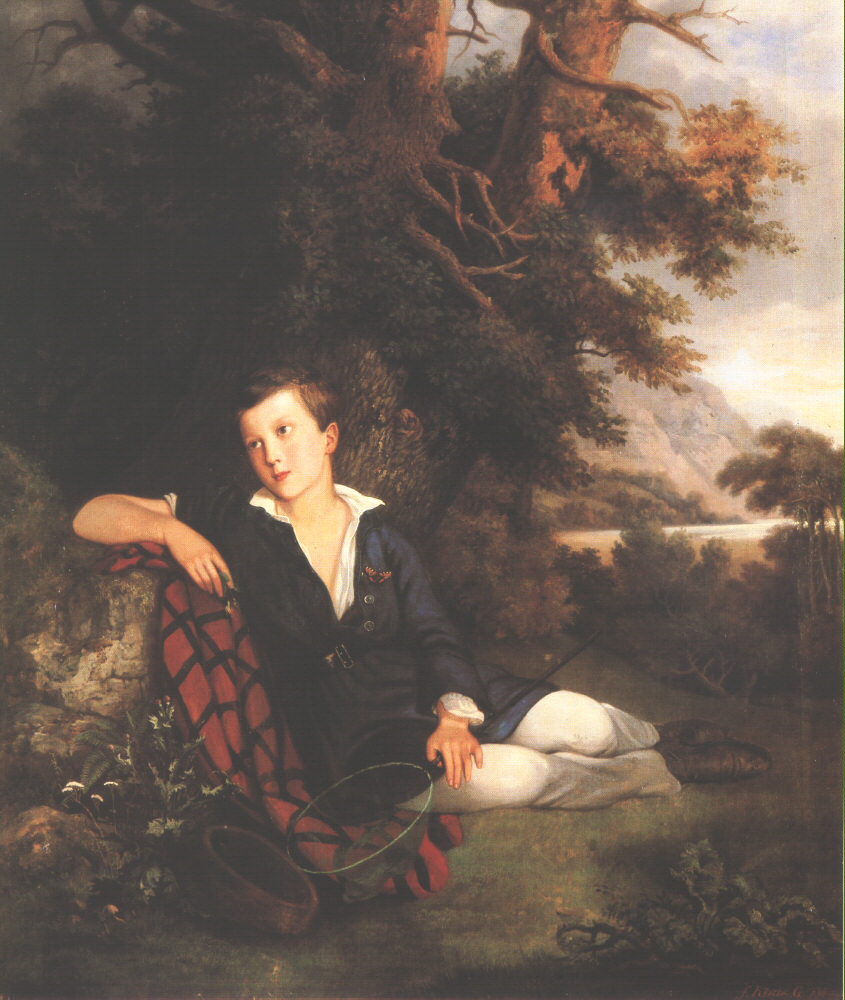
Portrait of Loránd Eötvös as a Young Man (1858)

Gusztáv Frigyes Kelety, originally Klette (13 December 1834, in Pozsony – 2 September 1902, in Budapest) was a Hungarian painter, graphic artist and art critic.

== Biography ==
His father, Károly Klette, was a court painter and drawing instructor for Archduke Joseph. In 1861, when a Hungarian title of nobility was granted, the family name was changed to Kelety.

Rather than follow his father's profession, Gusztáv originally trained in Vienna to be a lawyer, although he also took lessons from Carl Rahl. Upon the recommendation of his professor, Tivadar Pauler, he became a tutor to Loránd Eötvös, the son of Baron József Eötvös. That family's influence would later prove significant to his career. Soon, his law studies became secondary to his art studies and he spent some time at the Academy of Fine Arts Munich, where he studied with Johann Fischbach, Friedrich Voltz and Eduard Schleich.

In 1871, Baron Eötvös, who was then the Minister of Education, sent Kelety on a study tour to investigate how art instruction was conducted in other countries. He travelled to France, Belgium and Germany and produced a report titled The Function of Art Education in Our Country and Abroad, which recommended that a uniform system be established; including a "pre-art" school. The proposal was accepted and the "Hungarian Royal National School of Arts and Crafts" (now the Moholy-Nagy University of Art and Design) was launched in 1880. Kelety became the first Director.

From the mid-1860s, he wrote art reviews of a mostly conservative nature, although he was among the first to notice the talents of many painters who later became well-known, such as István Nagy, Tivadar Kosztka Csontváry, Mihály Munkácsy and Pál Szinyei Merse.

In his later years, he became ill with tuberculosis and attempted suicide shortly before dying of the disease in 1902.

== Writings ==
- Béla Várdai (ed.), Művészeti Dolgozatok (Art "Papers", or "Dissertations"). Kisfaludy Society, 1910.
