= Ilona Aczél =

Hungarian actress

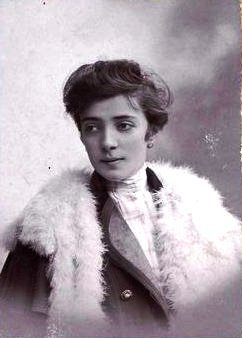
- Aczél, c. 1900
- Born: Gabrielle Magdolna Alter; 7 November 1884; Királyhelmec, Kingdom of Hungary (now modern-day Kráľovský Chlmec, Slovakia)
- Died: 5 March 1940 (aged 55); Budapest, Hungary
- Education: Academy of Drama and Film in Budapest
- Spouse: Kálmán Csathó

Ilona Aczél (7 November 1884 – 5 March 1940) was a Hungarian actress at the National Theatre in Budapest.

== Biography ==
Aczél was born Ilona Gabrielle Magdolna Alter to Sándor Alter and Paula Nebenzahl on the Hungarian Highland in 1884. She graduated from the Academy of Drama and Film in Budapest in 1905, and became contracted in Kolozsvár.

In 1908, she became part of the National Theatre and, in December 1912, was contracted by the Hungarian Theatre between 1914 and 1935, and acted again in the National Theatre, and later featured in the Hungarian Theatre and Comedy Theatre.

In 1928, she became a life member of the National Theatre.

She founded an acting school in Budapest around 1936.

She had a natural sense of humor, and was especially excelling in comedies, but she also prevailed in renditions of Shakespeare and Shaw's plays.

In 1911, she married writer Kálmán Csathó.

== Notable roles ==
- Béliné (Molière: A hypochondriac)
- Éva (Imre Madách: The Tragedy of Man)
- Portia (Shaw: A velencei kalmár)
- Ella Rentheim (Ibsen: John Gabriel Borkman)
- Szűz Mária (Voinovich G.: Magyar Passió)
- Júlia (Csathó K.: Az én lányom nem olyan)
- Linka (Csathó: Te csak pipálj Ladányi)
- Ilona (Csathó: A házasságok az égben köttetnek)
