= Stare Łysogórki =

- Village
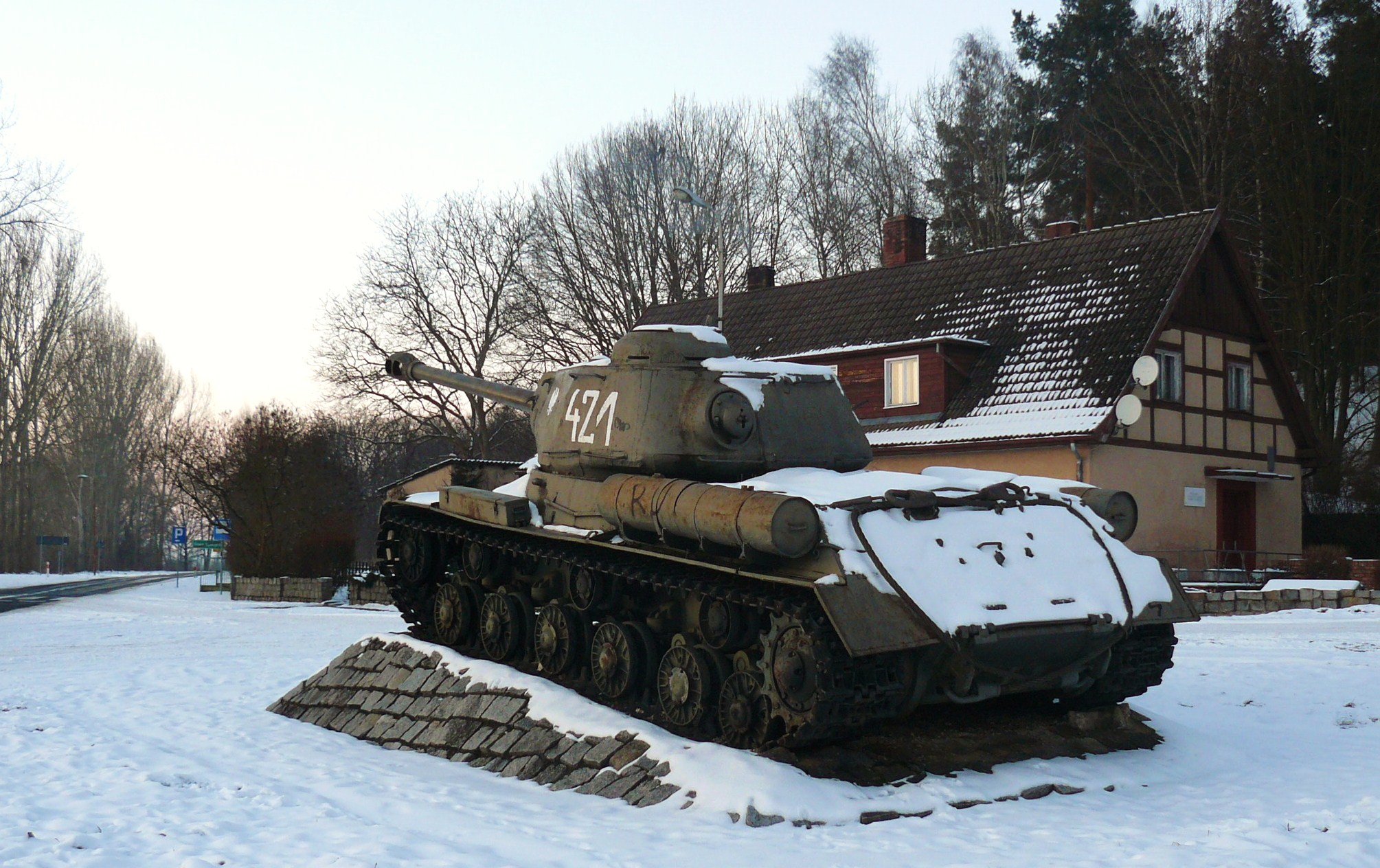
- Museum dedicated to the First Polish Army

- Location within Poland
- Coordinates: 52°47′N 14°17′E
- Country: Poland
- Voivodeship: West Pomeranian
- County: Gryfino
- Gmina: Mieszkowice
- Population: 150
- Time zone: UTC+1 (CET)
  - Summer (DST): UTC+2 (CEST)

Stare Łysogórki (Polish pronunciation: [ˈstarɛ wɨsɔˈɡurki]; German: Alt-Lietzegöricke) is a village in the administrative district of Gmina Mieszkowice, within Gryfino County, West Pomeranian Voivodeship, in north-western Poland, close to the German border. It lies approximately 14 km (9 mi) west of Mieszkowice, 54 km (34 mi) south of Gryfino, and 74 km (46 mi) south of the regional capital Szczecin.

There is a World War II cemetery, where about 2,000 Polish soldiers rest, a monument commemorating the sappers of the First Polish Army, and a museum dedicated to the First Polish Army (Muzeum Pamiątek 1 Armii Wojska Polskiego) in the village.

The village has a population of 150.

== History ==
From the High Middle Ages the region was part of the Kingdom of Poland, Margraviate of Brandenburg, Czech Kingdom, Teutonic Order, Brandenburg again, Prussia and Germany from 1871 to 1945, administratively located at that time in the Province of Brandenburg (Frankfurt Region), and again Poland after the defeat of Nazi Germany in World War II.

When part of Prussia, after the drainage of the Oderbruch, in 1753 a new village, the present Neulietzegöricke, was founded including wetlands formerly used by people from then Lietzegöricke, and therefore named after it. Lietzegöricke later adopted a name extension as Alt-Lietzegöricke (Alt and Stare both meaning "old"), and was renamed again after 1945.

== Notable residents ==
- Hermann Nothnagel (1841–1905), physician
