= Antal Hekler =

Hungarian archeologist and art historian (1882–1940)

Antal Hekler (also Anton)
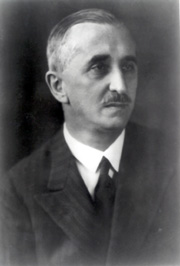
- Hekler c. 1935
- Born: 1 February 1882; Budapest, Hungary
- Died: 3 March 1940 (aged 58); Budapest, Hungary
- Known for: Publications in classical archaeology and history of art
- Scientific career
- Fields: Classical archaeology, history of art
- Workplaces: Eötvös Loránd University

Antal Hekler (1 February 1882 – 3 March 1940) was a Hungarian/German classical archaeologist and art historian. He was a member of the Hungarian Academy of Sciences.

== Life ==
He wrote his doctoral thesis in political science in 1903 and then studied classical archaeology in Munich under Adolf Furtwängler, where he wrote his second doctoral thesis, before he returned to his birthplace Budapest, where he first worked at the city's national museum and later held a chair for Christian archaeology and history of art at the Faculty of Sciences of the University of Budapest.

He went on dedicating himself to ancient art, but also to Hungarian art history. At Hekler's instigation the Budapest Museum of Fine Arts purchased 135 Greek, Roman and Italian sculptures from the Munich collection of Paul Arndt in 1908. Later another 650 terracotta sculptures were added from Arndt's collection.

Anna Zádor studied art history under Hekler at Pázmány Péter University (now called ELTE) starting 1922. After graduating in 1926, she continued working under Hekler until 1936, from which time she fell under persecution as a Jew.

Hekler’s book, Die Bildniskunst der Griechen & Römer (Greek and Roman Portraits) — published in Stuttgart and London in 1912 — soon became a widespread standard work, also getting translated and published in other languages.

== Publications ==
- Die Bildniskunst der Griechen & Römer, Hoffmann, Stuttgart 1912
- A Klasszicizmus jelentősége és térfoglalása az ókori művészetben, A budavári tudományos társaság, Budapest 1921
- Die Kunst des Phidias, Hoffmann, Stuttgart 1924
- Die Sammlung antiker Skulpturen, Krystall, Vienna 1929 (Die Budapester Sammlungen. Die Antiken in Budapest, Abt. 1)
- Budapest als Kunststadt, Lindner, Küssnacht 1933
- Die Universität Budapest, Lindner, Basel 1935
- Ungarische Kunstgeschichte, Mann, Berlin 1937
- Bildnisse berühmter Griechen, Kupferberg, Berlin 1940 (3. edition, expanded by Helga von Heintze 1962)
