= Szidi Rákosi =

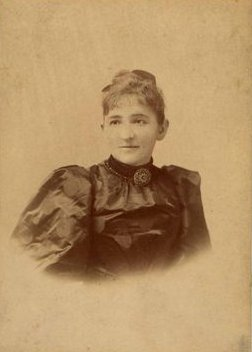
- Rákosi, c. 1888
- Born: Szidónia Kremsner; 28 May 1852; Ötvös, Kingdom of Hungary
- Died: 20 October 1935 (aged 83); Budapest, Hungary
- Occupations: Actress; acting teacher

Szidi Rákosi (born Szidónia Kremsner; 28 May 1852 – 20 October 1935) was a Hungarian actress and acting teacher. Her relatives included Béla Rákosi, Jenő Rákosi, Viktor Rákosi and Ida Rákosi, the wife of Lajos Evva.

== Biography ==
Rákosi was the daughter of János Kremsner and Anna Vogel. In 1867, their surname was changed from Kremsner to Rákosi.

Rákosi began her career in 1867 at the Budai Theatre. She graduated from a drama academy in 1870. From 1870 to 1872, she performed at the National Theatre in Budapest. She married Zsolt Beöthy, with whom she had two children: László Beöthy (13 April 1873), a theatrical director, and Zsigmond (1875). She divorced Zsolt in 1877 and began to perform at the Budai Theatre again until 1885.

In 1909, she became a life member of the National Theatre, and also became an honorary member in 1928 until 1934. She also appeared at the Magyar Theatre in 1917, and the Comedy Theatre of Budapest in 1920. She was relatively unknown towards the beginning of her career, but found fame in grandmotherly and comedic roles.

In 1892, Rákosi was part of an actor-led training school, which educated generations of Hungarian actors for the stage. On 8 February 1895, she provided an application to the Budapest City Council for a civic theatre. The new theatre was named the Magyar Theatre. The plot of land needed to build the theater was bought by her brother and her sister's husband, Lajos Evva.

Her children and students helped support Rákosi in Budapest until she died at age 83.

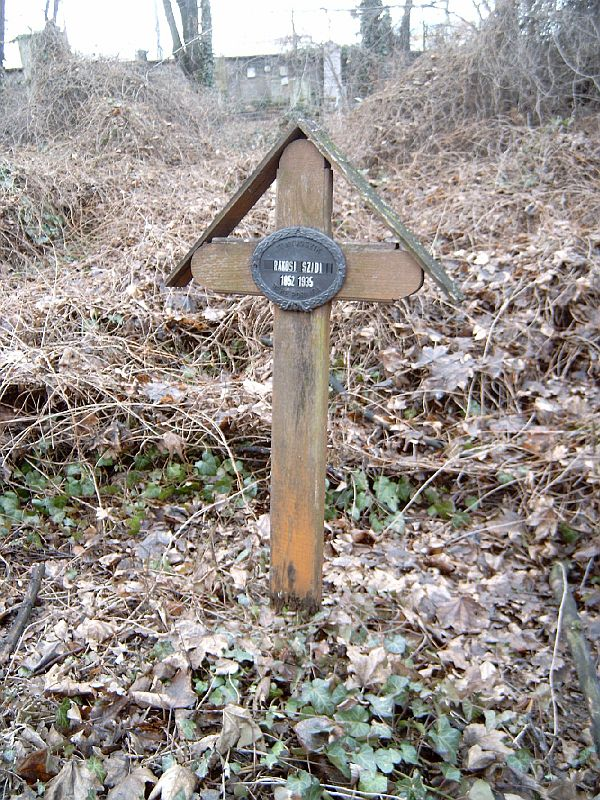
Szidi Rákosi's marker in Budapest's Kerepesi cemetery.

== Teaching ==
In 1892, she opened her own theater school. In 1909, she became a life member of the National Theatre. The King's Theatre celebrated 40 years of her educational work. Notable students of hers include Sári Fedák and Gyula Gózon.

== Gallery ==
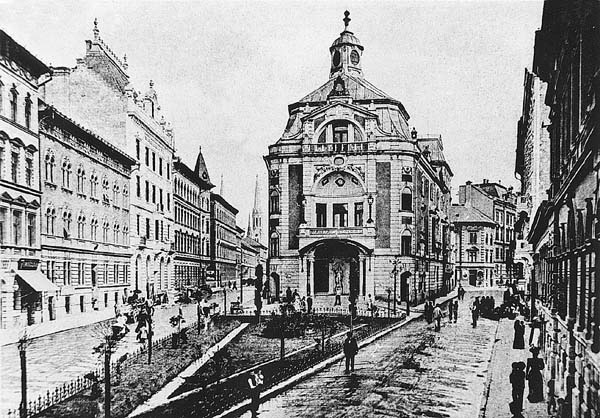
The Magyar Theatre (1897)

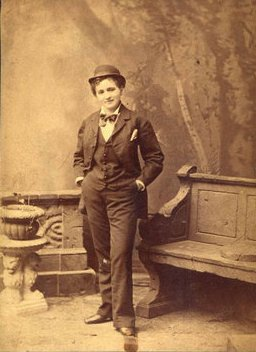
Szidi Rákosi in an unknown role

== Other information ==
- Szinészkönyvtár - Rákosi Szidi
- Rákosi Szidi, Kremsner Szidónia Drámai színésznő, színészpedagógus, színiiskola-alapító és -vezető
- MAGYAR SZÍNHÁZTÖRTÉNET - Magyar Színház
