= Acsád =

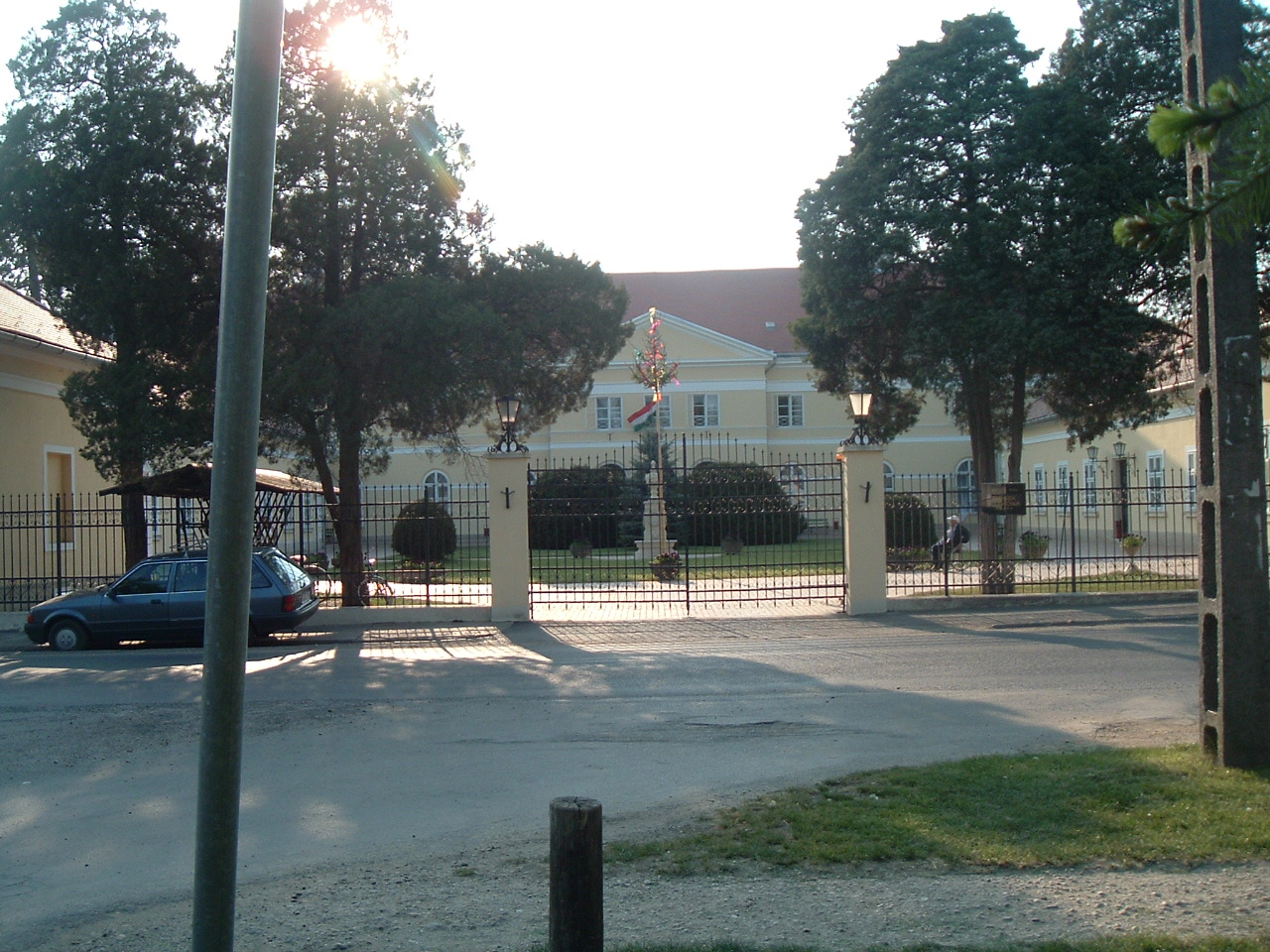

- Flag Seal

- Location of Vas county in Hungary

- Location of Acsád
- Coordinates: 47.32292°N 16.73443°E
- Country: Hungary
- County: Vas

Area
  - Total: 14.34 km^{2} (5.54 sq mi)

Population (2004)
  - Total: 661
  - Density: 46.09/km^{2} (119.4/sq mi)
- Time zone: UTC+1 (CET)
  - Summer (DST): UTC+2 (CEST)
- Postal code: 9746
- Area code: 94

Acsád is a village in Vas County, Hungary.

== Notable people ==
- Nándor Fettich (1900–1971), archaeologist and goldsmith
- Béla Rákosi (1841–?), doctor
- Jenő Rákosi (1842–1929), writer and journalist
