= Ukk =

- Flag Coat of arms

- Location of Veszprém county in Hungary

- Location of Ukk
- Coordinates: 47.04342°N 17.21193°E
- Country: Hungary
- County: Veszprém

Government
  - Mayor: Torsa Gergely (Ind.)

Area
  - Total: 13.87 km^{2} (5.36 sq mi)

Population (2022)
  - Total: 289
  - Density: 20.8/km^{2} (54.0/sq mi)
- Time zone: UTC+1 (CET)
  - Summer (DST): UTC+2 (CEST)
- Postal code: 8347
- Area code: 87

Ukk is a village in Veszprém county, Hungary.

== Notable people ==
- Viktor Rákosi (1860–1923), writer
