= György Zádor =

Hungarian jurist and writer

György Zádor (Duka, 3 July 1799 - Pest, 17 August 1866) was a jurist and writer from the Austrian Empire. He was a member of the Hungarian Academy of Sciences and the Kisfaludy Society.

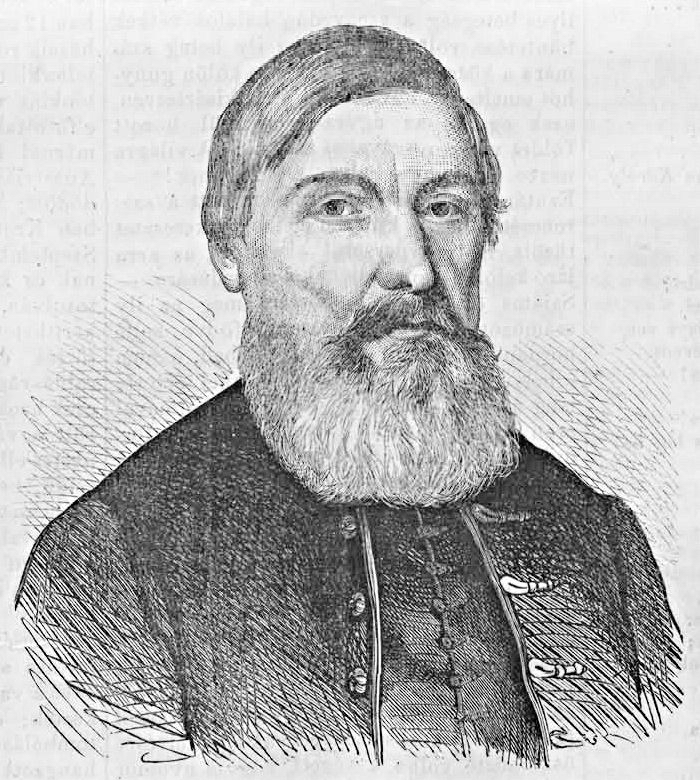
György Zádor

György Zádor went to schools in Pápa, Kőszeg, Győr and to the University in Pest, where he met Mihály Vörösmarty and he started publishing using Fenyéri Gyula as his nom de plume.
