= Zádor, Slovakia =

Village and municipality in Slovakia

Zádor Zádorháza
- Municipality
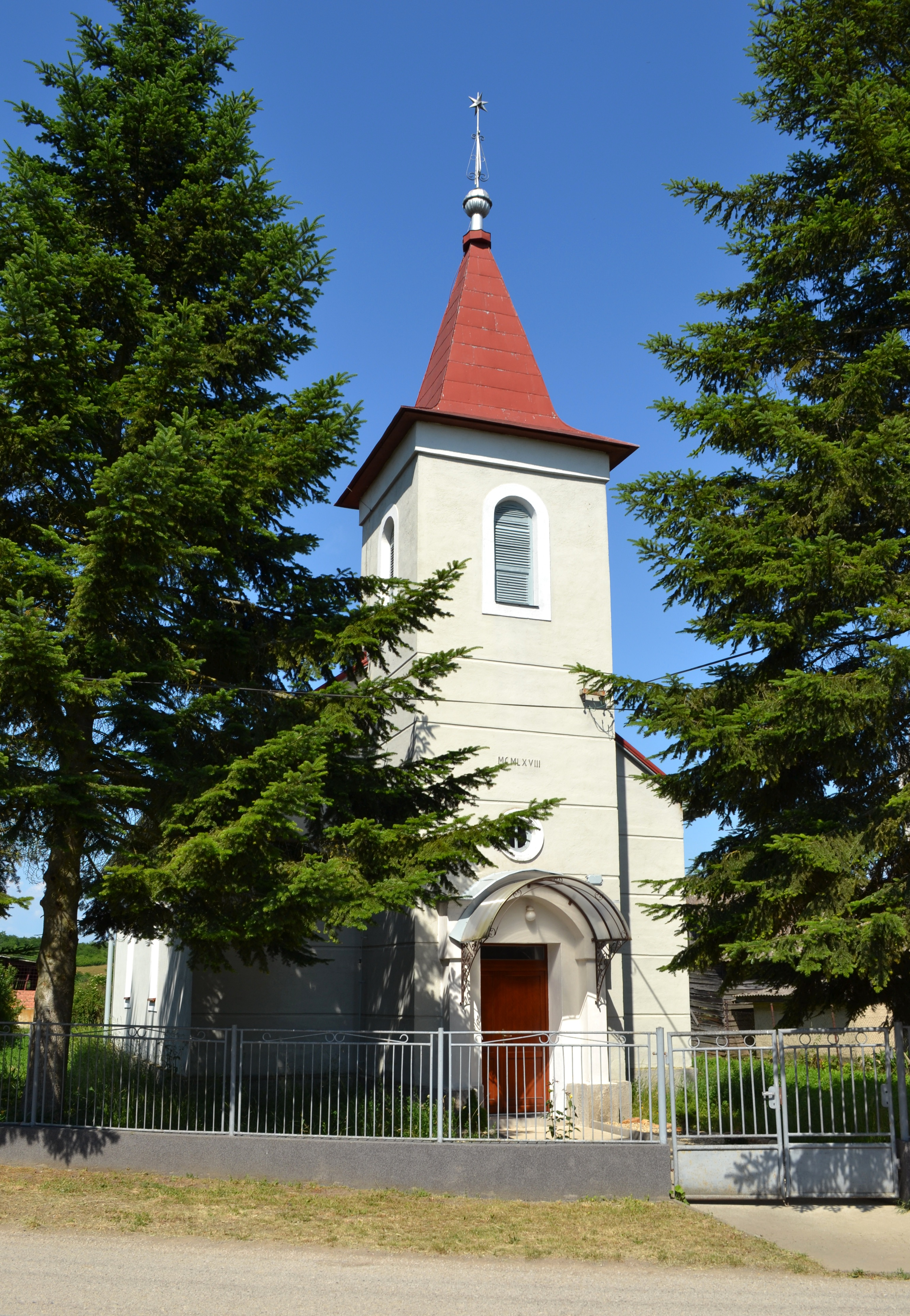

- Flag

- Location of Zádor in the Banská Bystrica Region Location of Zádor in Slovakia
- Coordinates: 48.32°N 20.25°E
- Country: Slovakia
- Region: Banská Bystrica Region
- District: Rimavská Sobota District
- First mentioned: 1327

Area
  - Total: 3.46 km^{2} (1.34 sq mi)
- Elevation: 164 m (538 ft)

Population (2025)
  - Total: 132
- Time zone: UTC+1 (CET)
  - Summer (DST): UTC+2 (CEST)
- Postal code: 980 42
- Area code: +421 47
- Vehicle registration plate (until 2022): RS

Zádor (Hungarian: Zádorháza) is a village and municipality in the Rimavská Sobota District of the Banská Bystrica Region of southern Slovakia.

== Geography ==
The municipality lies at an altitude of 164 metres (538 ft) and covers an area of 3.46 km^{2} (1.34 sq mi) (2025).

== Population ==
Population statistic (10 years)
Year	1995	2005	2015	2025
Count	117	119	148	132
Difference		+1.70%	+24.36%	−10.81%

Population statistic
Year	2024	2025
Count	132	132
Difference		+0%

It has a population of 132 people (31 December 2025).

=== Ethnicity ===
Census 2021 (1+ %)
Ethnicity	Number	Fraction
Hungarian	107	79.25%
Slovak	21	15.55%
Not found out	15	11.11%
Romani	5	3.7%
Total	135	

In year 2021 was 135 people by ethnicity 107 as Hungarian, 21 as Slovak, 15 as Not found out and 5 as Romani.

Note on population: The difference values of population numbers in the table "Population statistic" and in the sections "Ethnicity" & "Religion" is caused by the use of various statistical methods.

=== Religion ===
Census 2021 (1+ %)
Religion	Number	Fraction
Calvinist Church	62	45.93%
Roman Catholic Church	27	20%
Not found out	18	13.33%
None	15	11.11%
Jehovah's Witnesses	6	4.44%
Other and not ascertained christian church	3	2.22%
Total	135	

In year 2021 was 135 people by religion 62 from Calvinist Church, 27 from Roman Catholic Church, 18 from Not found out, 15 from None, 6 from Jehovah's Witnesses, 3 from Other and not ascertained christian church, 1 from Christian Congregations in Slovakia, 1 from Greek Catholic Church, 1 from Evangelical Church and 1 from Church of the Brethren.
