= Károly Klette =

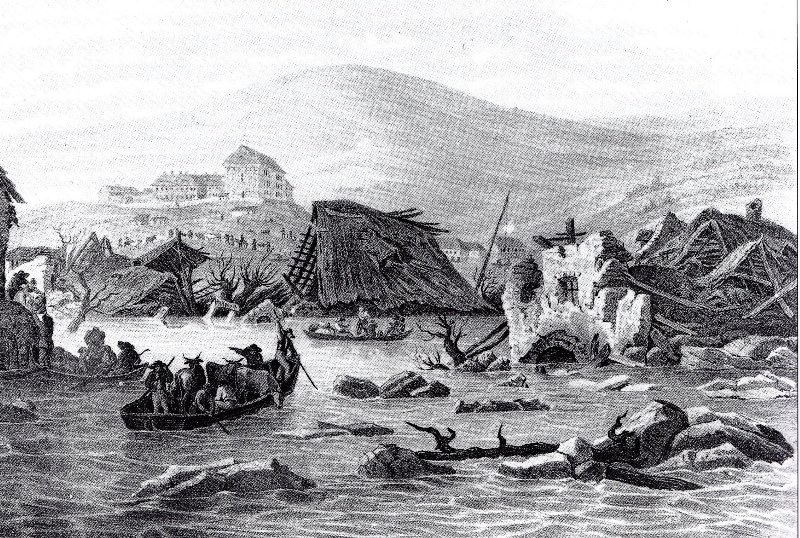
The city of Óbuda, during the flood of 1838

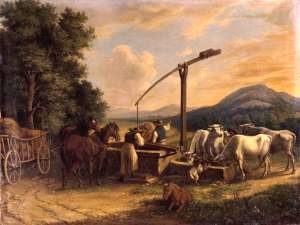
Watering the Farm Animals

Károly Klette (German: Karl Klette von Klettenhof; 18 October 1793, Dresden – 26 June 1874, Budapest) was a court painter and graphic artist; specializing in landscapes, still-lifes and vedute. He had two famous sons; the economist, Károly Keleti and the painter, Gusztáv Kelety.

== Biography ==
His father was a clerk in the court of the Electorate of Saxony. He displayed an aptitude for art at an early age and began his studies immediately upon finishing his primary education. Following some initial work in Dresden, he moved to Prague, then completed his studies in Vienna. A few years later, he went to Hungary and found employment with the noble Zichy family. He became well known at the court of Archduke Joseph, Palatine of Hungary, and later taught art to Joseph's son, the future Archduke Stephen.

It was around this time that he became acquainted with the Sánthó family and, through that connection met his wife, Johanna Bayer. They had three children; two sons, mentioned above, and a daughter, Franciska, who became the wife of János Hanzély (1821-1899), a Royal Counselor. He was appointed a court painter in 1832.

When the Archduke Joseph died in 1847, his family moved to Vienna and his court was dismissed. Stephen, now Archduke, moved to his estate at Schauenburg, in the Duchy of Nassau. He invited Klette to spend the summers there, which he did for three years. He continued to maintain some contact until Stephen's death in 1867. Many of his works were reproduced in color and sold throughout Germany and Austria.

Despite enjoying a fair amount of popularity, he was largely forgotten by the time of his death.

== Sources ==
- Biography @ Művészet
- Biographical notes @ the Oxford Index
