= Anna Zádor =

Hungarian historian

- in the 1920s
- Born: 24 September 1904; Budapest, Austria-Hungary
- Died: 3 March 1995 (aged 90); Budapest, Hungary

Anna Zádor or Anna Zador (24 September 1904 – 3 March 1995) was a leading Hungarian historian.

== Life ==
Zádor was born in Budapest in 1904 to a Jewish family. She took a degree in Art History at Pázmány Péter University. She volunteered to work for Professor Antal Hekler at the Eötvös Loránd University for a decade.

She survived the second world war but both her brother and her husband died in concentration camps. After the war she led the Franklin Society.

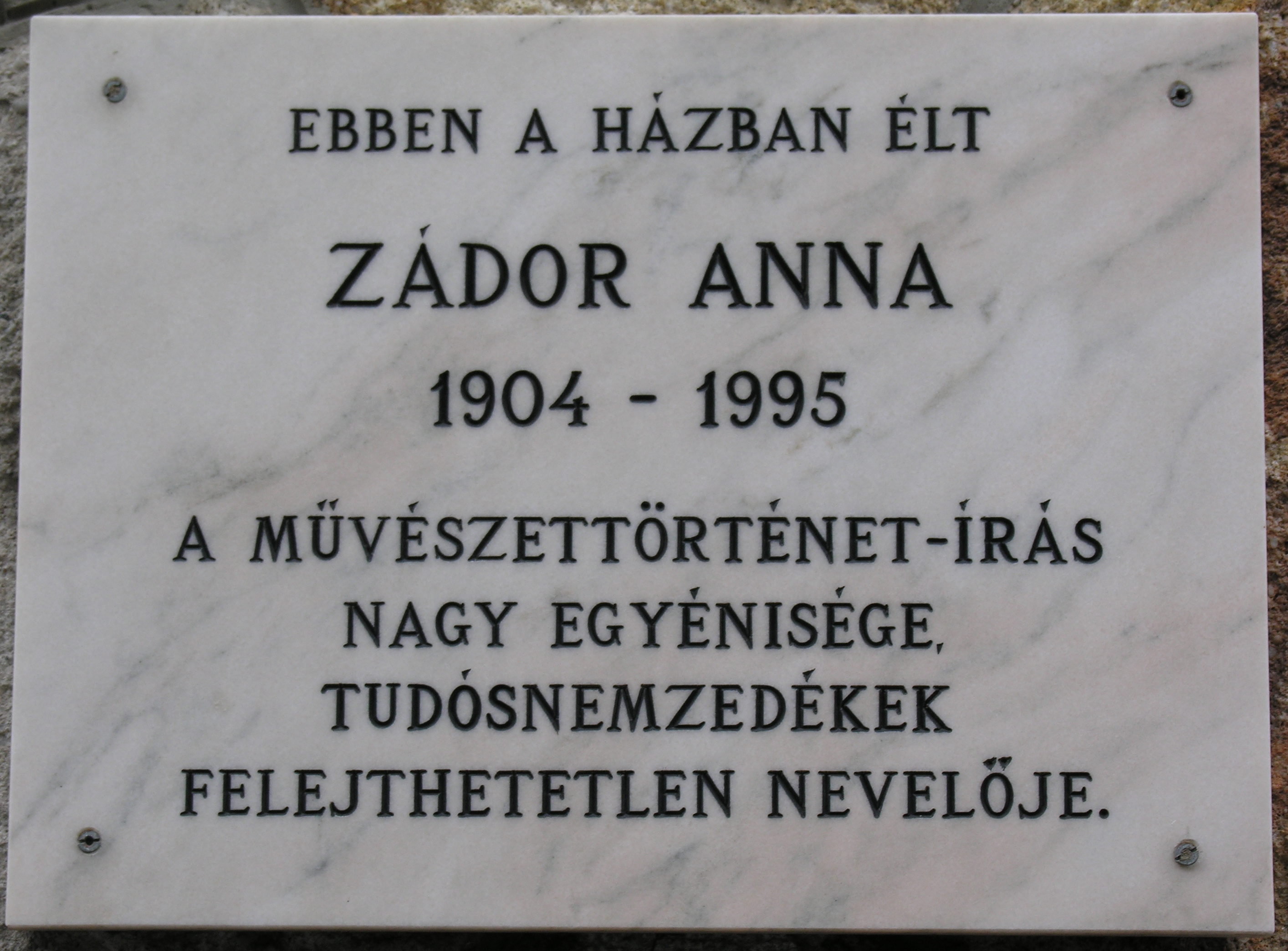
Plaque to her memory in Budapest

She began teaching Art History in 1951 and she gained her doctorate in 1961. She became widely known for the books that she published. These dealt with the Italian renaissance, Hungarian culture and history and the English Garden in Hungary

Zádor died in Budapest in 1995. There is a plaque in her memory on Rózsahegy Street No 1/b in Budapest. Zador's memoirs are a useful source for the Holocaust in Hungary as she survived and she knew many who did not.

== Works ==
- Italian architectural theories in the Renaissance and Baroque era;
- Architectural History of Hungary;
- The Hungarian National Museum;
- The Art of Hungarian Reformation;
- The English Garden in Hungary
- Classicism and Romance;
- Architecture and its Past.
