= Michael Joseph Rossbach =

German clinician and pharmacologist

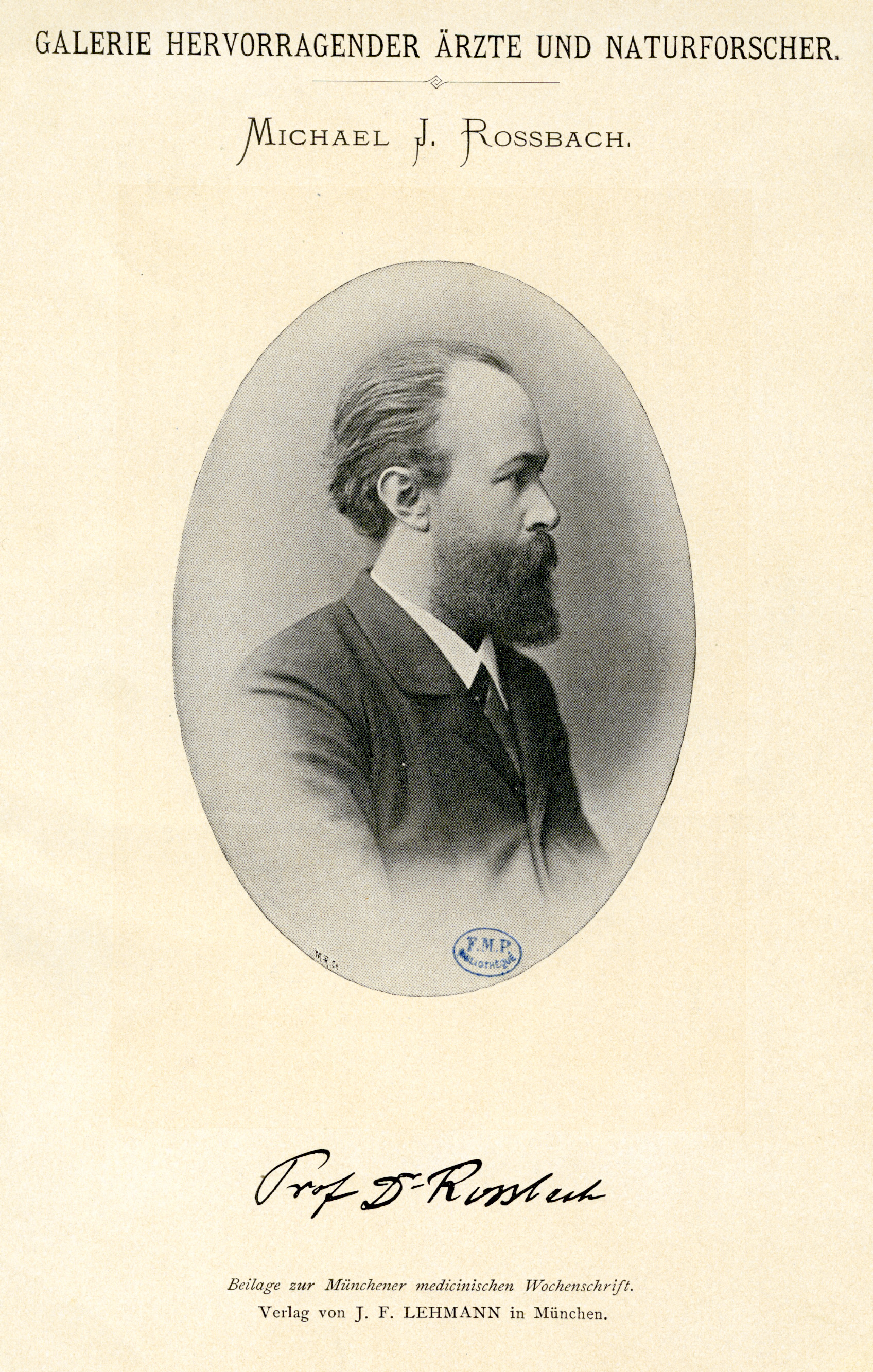
- Born: 12 February 1842; Würzburg, Kingdom of Bavaria, German Confederation
- Died: 12 October 1894 (aged 52); Munich, Kingdom of Bavaria, German Empire
- Education: University of Würzburg; Ludwig-Maximilians-Universität München; Friedrich Wilhelm University of Berlin; University of Prague
- Scientific career
- Fields: Pharmacology

Michael Joseph Rossbach (12 February 1842, Heidingsfeld – 8 October 1894, Munich) was a German clinician and pharmacologist.

He studied medicine at the University of Würzburg, the Ludwig-Maximilians-Universität München, the Friedrich Wilhelm University of Berlin and the University of Prague, receiving his doctorate in 1865. In 1869, he qualified as a lecturer in pharmacology at Würzburg, where in 1874 he became an associate professor. In 1882 became a full professor of special pathology and therapy and director of the medical clinic at the University of Jena as a successor to Hermann Nothnagel. In 1892, he resigned his professorship at Jena for reasons of health.

His name is associated with "Rossbach's disease", a gastric disorder better known as hyperchlorhydria.

== Selected works ==
With Nothnagel, he was co-author of "Handbuch der Arzneimittellehre" (from the 3rd edition onward); a textbook that was translated into English with the title "A treatise on materia medica : (including therapeutics and toxicology)". Other noteworthy written efforts by Rossbach are:

- Physiologie und Pathologie der menschlichen Stimme; auf Grundlage der neuesten akustischen Leistungen, 1869 – Physiology and pathology of the human voice; based on the latest acoustic achievements.
- Pharmakologische Untersuchungen, 2 volumes 1873-76 – Pharmacological studies.
- Lehrbuch der physikalischen Heilmethoden für Aerzte und Studirende, 1882 – Textbook of physical healing methods for physicians and students.
- Ueber den gegenwärtigen Stand der internen Therapie und den therapeutischen Unterricht an den deutschen Hochschulen, 1883 – On the current state of internal therapy and therapeutic education at German universities.
