= Budapesti Hírlap =

The Budapesti Hírlap (Hungarian pronunciation: [ˈbudɒpɛʃti ˈhiːrlɒp]) was a Hungarian daily newspaper published in Budapest from 16 June 1881 to 1938. Between 25 March and 28 September 1919 it was temporarily closed down. The paper had a conservative and nationalistic orientation.
