= Kufstein Fortress =

Austrian castle

Coordinates: 47.580°N 12.169°E

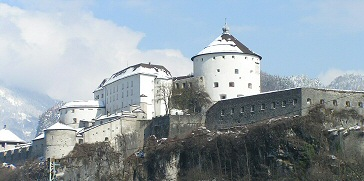
The Fortress of Kufstein.

The Kufstein Fortress (German: Festung Kufstein) is the main landmark of Kufstein, a town in Tyrol, Austria. It is sometimes wrongly referred to as Geroldseck Fortress. It is on a hill commanding Kufstein proper. Kufstein Fortress is 507 metres (1,663 ft) above sea level.

The fortress is linked to the city below by the Festungsbahn, a funicular railway, or inclined lift, on a track that is 50 metres (160 ft) long.

== History ==
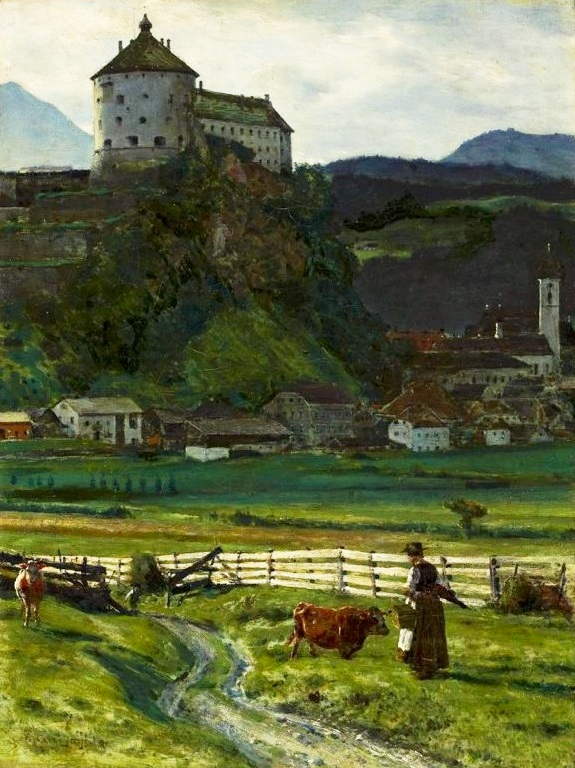
Kufstein Castle in 1889 by Aleksander Gierymski, National Museum in Warsaw

The fortress was mentioned for the first time in a document from 1205, where it was called Castrum Caofstein. At the time, it was a possession of the Bavarian Duke Ludwig and the bishop of Regensburg. In 1415, it was reinforced by Louis VII, Duke of Bavaria. It was a fiercely fought over fortress between Bavaria and the Tyrol and had a pivotal role in an armed conflict in 1336, when Margrave Charles of Moravia had to abandon his pursuit of the Bavarians when the fortress blocked his route.

In 1342, Margarete "Maultasch", Duchess of the Tyrol, received Kufstein as a wedding present from her husband Louis of Brandenburg, son of Emperor Ludwig of Bavaria. This was the first time that Kufstein became part of the Tyrol. When Margarete handed all of the Tyrol to the Habsburg Duke Rudolph IV in 1363, the Bavarians demanded that she return her original wedding gift and successfully invaded Kufstein.

In 1504, the city and the fortress were besieged and conquered by Emperor Maximilian I. Maximilian had the massive round tower built between 1518 and 1522, substantially adding to its defensibility. From 1703 to 1805 it was a Bavarian possession, returning to Austria in 1814.

The fortress acted as a prison for a number of political dissidents under the Habsburgs. Its name is deeply embedded in Hungarian history. The list of prominent Hungarians imprisoned in the fortress includes:

1. Sen. Miklós Wesselényi, a Hungarian nobleman, from 1785 to 1789;
2. János Batsányi, a poet, from 1794 to 1796;
3. László Szentjóbi Szabó, a poet, in 1795;
4. Ferenc Kazinczy, an advocate of Hungarian language and literature, from 1799 to 1800;
5. Klára Leövey, a teacher;
6. György Gaál, a Protestant preacher, from 1850 to 1856;
7. Countess Blanka Teleki, a socialite and educator, from 1853 to 1856;
8. Sándor Rózsa, Hungary's "Robin Hood", a revolutionary, from 1859 to 1865;
9. Máté Haubner, an evangelical bishop.

It was also where some 100 of the Poles arrested after the 1846 Kraków Uprising were held.

It was also here that the romanian confessor saints Visarion Sarai, Nicolae Oprea Miclăuș, Ioan din Galeș, and Moise Măcinic—who fought to preserve the Orthodox faith in Transylvania—were imprisoned and died.

The fortress has an unusual war memorial, the Heroes' Organ (Heldenorgel). This is the largest open-air organ in the world. It was constructed in 1931 as a memorial to the dead of World War One. It is mentioned in the James Bond book On Her Majesty's Secret Service.

The fortress now houses the City Museum of Kufstein. Part of it is also used for concerts and meetings.

== Gallery ==
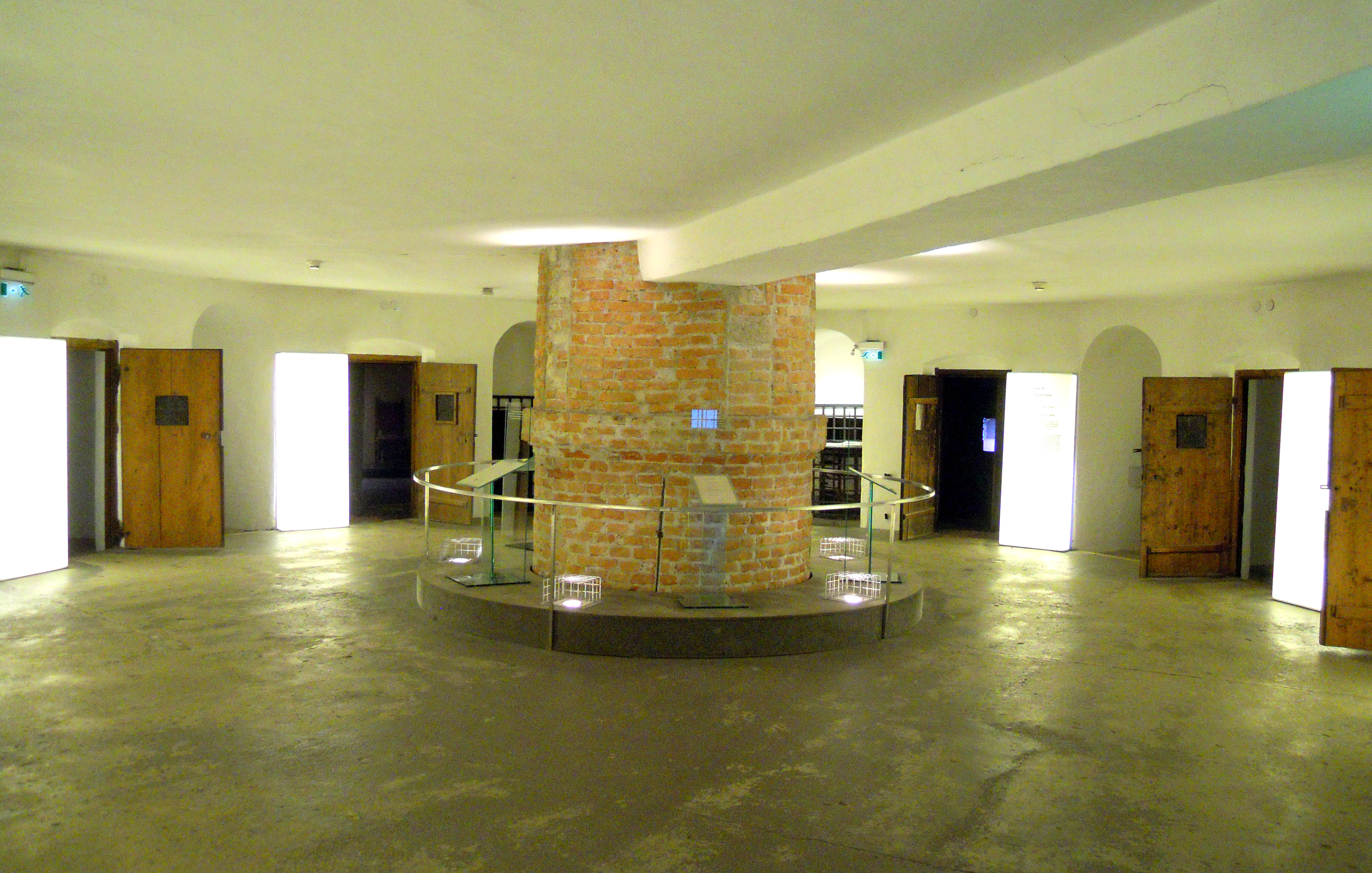
The cells in the tower at Kufstein Fortress

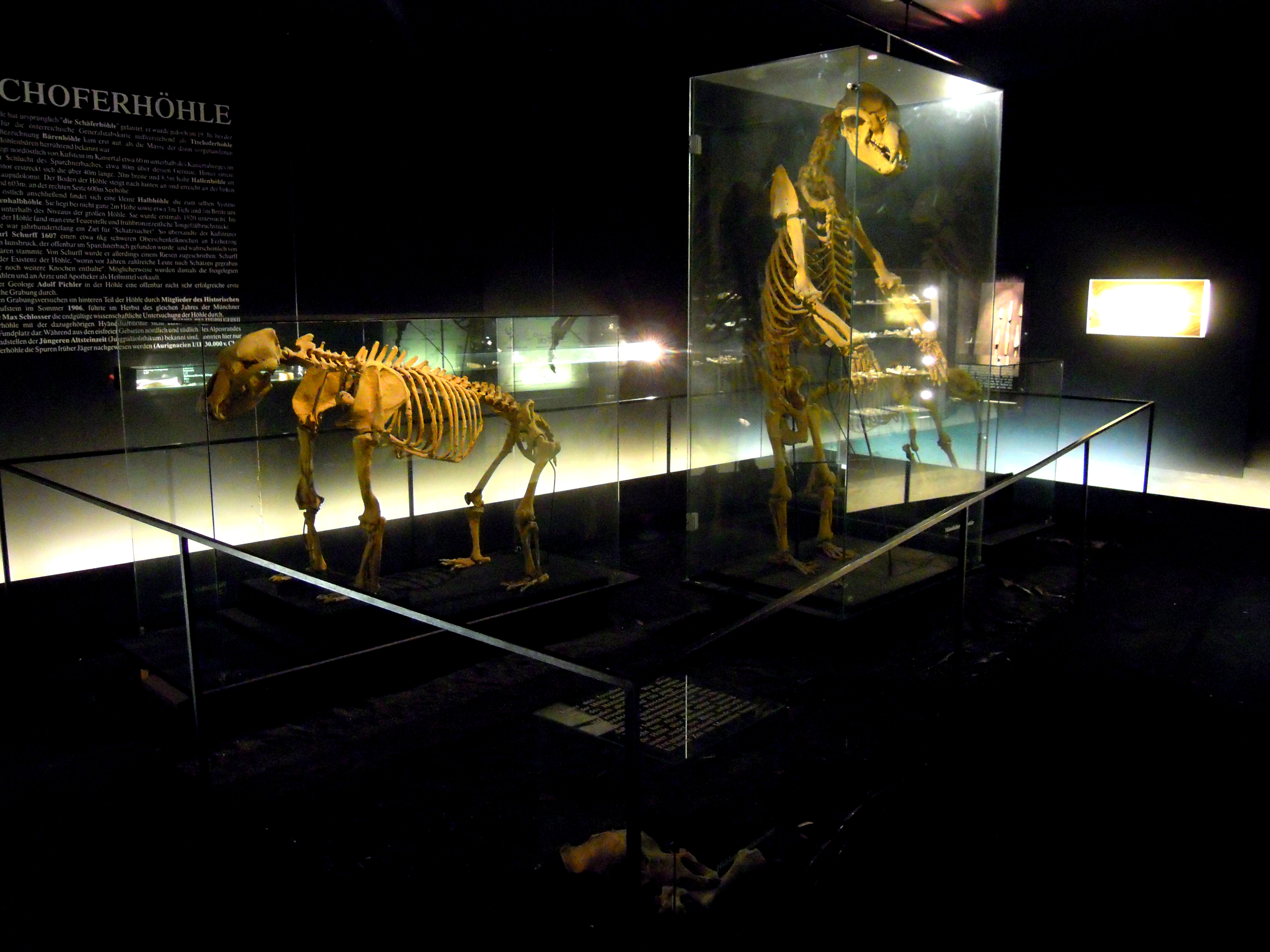
Animal skeletons in the museum

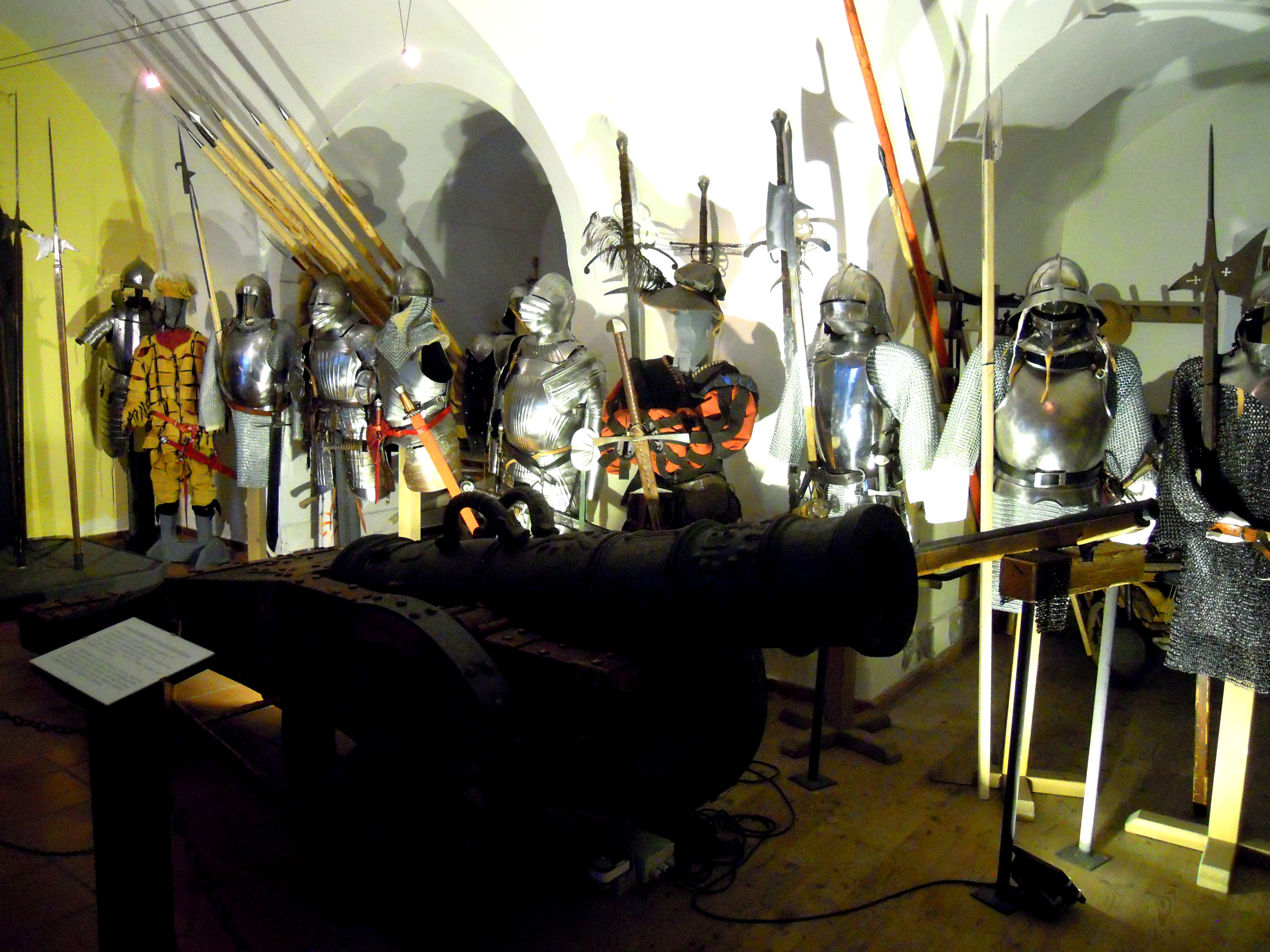
Display of armour in the museum

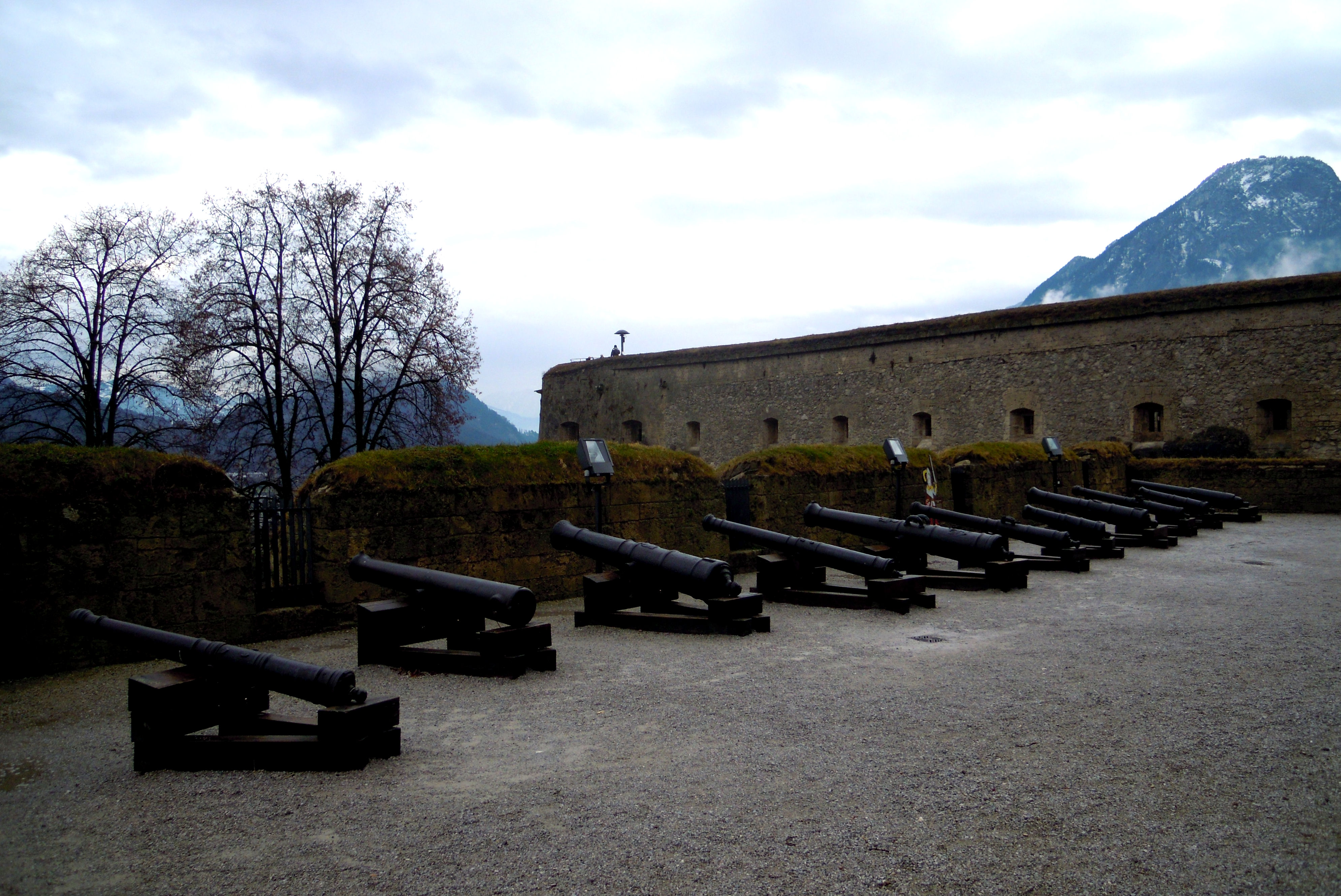
Display of artillery at the fortress

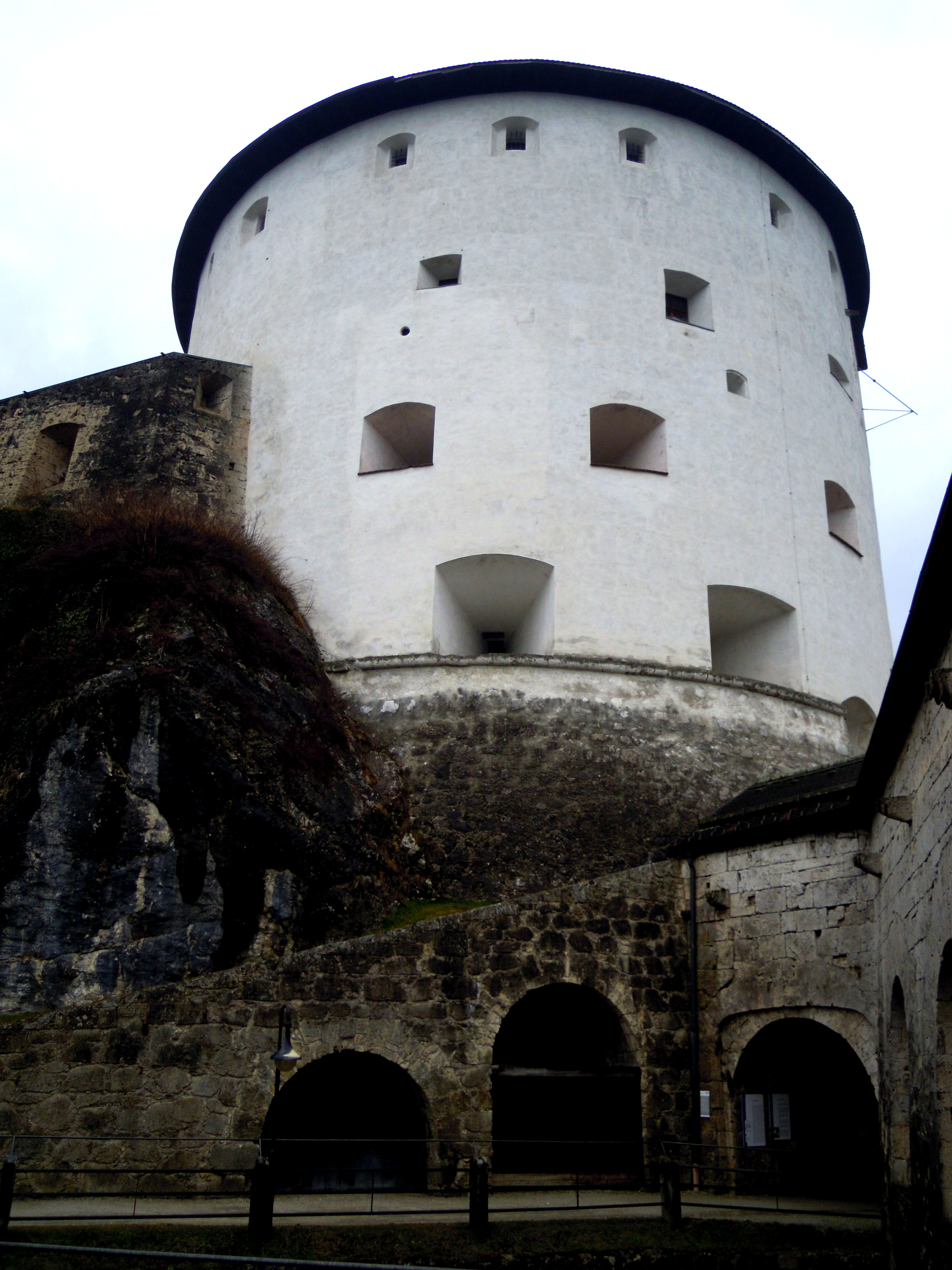
The tower at Kufstein Fortress

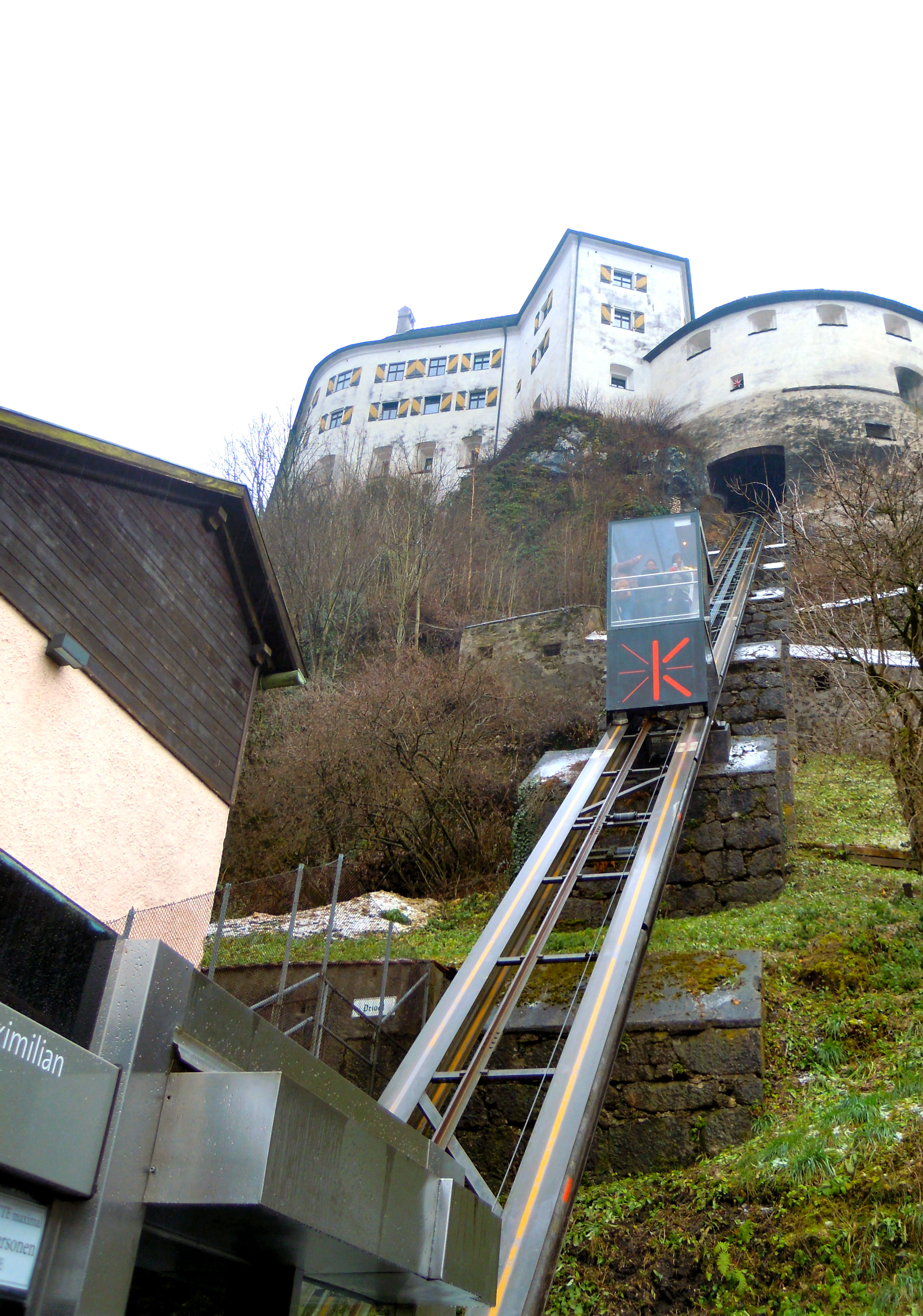
The Kaiser Maximilian Funicular Railway
