= Festungsbahn =

Festungsbahn may refer to:

- The Festungsbahn (Kufstein), a funicular railway in Kufstein, Austria
- The Festungsbahn (Salzburg), a funicular railway in Salzburg, Austria
