= Janka Zirzen =

Hungarian teacher (1824 – 1904)

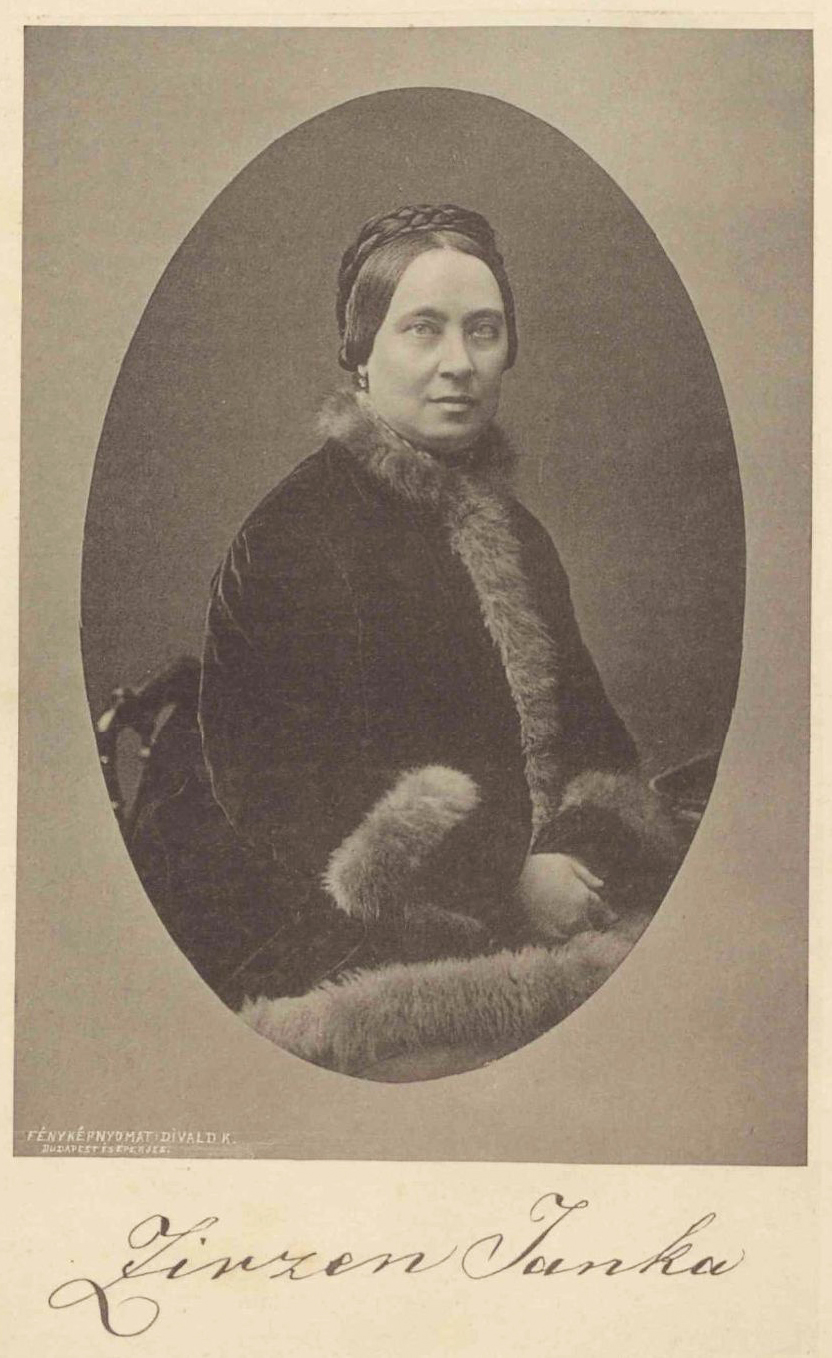
Janka Zirzen

Janka Zirzen (23 May 1824 – 28 December 1904) was a Hungarian teacher who was a pioneer in the field of women's education and teacher training in Hungary. In 1869, she became the first woman in Hungary to head a public training school when she was appointed as the director of the newly established teacher training school. She also played an important role in introducing industrial education for women along with regular teacher training.

== Life and early career ==
Janka Zirzen was born on 23 May 1824 in a family with a small estate in Jászberény, Hungary, where she was raised by her mother, a midwife. She completed her studies from women's educational institutions in Pest and Eger. At the age of fifteen, Zirzen became a governess to support herself. She later started a small nursery school for girls at her parents' house in Jászberény, but she was not successful due to lack of money. She subsequently moved to Eger where she became a governess. At the request of people, she reopened the nursery school in 1846, which was closed in 1849. Between 1849 and 1866, she again worked as governess. Meanwhile, she also graduated from the teacher training institute in Pest. On completing her teacher training in 1866, she started working on women's education.

== Teacher training school for women ==
Following the Austro-Hungarian Compromise of 1867, the school education was made compulsory in Hungary for the age group 6–12. In 1868, József Eötvös, the Minister of Religion and Public Education, asked Zirzen to organize the education of the school. In the following year, a public teacher training school for women, the first Hungarian teacher training institute, was established in Buda where Zirzen became the director. The regular teaching only started in 1870 due to a smallpox epidemic.

== Industrial education for women ==
In the early 1870s, Eötvösto's successor, Ágoston Trefort showed interest in expanding the scope of women's education. He asked Zirzen to study the domestic and foreign industrial schools with aim of training female teachers, housewives and working girls. In 1875, she visited Vienna, Paris and German cities to acquire professional knowledge on the functioning of industrial schools. On her return, she brought machines and equipments for developing industrial education for women.

== Elizabeth Women's School ==
On the direction of Trefort, a number of teacher training courses were introduced for upper secondary and civil schools. In 1873, a civil school was formed along with an apprentice school from the existing teacher training institute. In 1875, the school was moved to the modern building of Sugárút. In 1881, the training for elementary school teachers was discontinued after graduating 400 teachers. In its place, the trainings for housewives and domestic nanny were introduced. In 1888, the institute was elevated to the rank of college and named Higher Teacher Training College. The teachers and principals working in the higher girls' schools and teacher training colleges were trained by the newly designated college. In 1898, the institute was renamed Elizabeth Women's School in memory of Queen Elizabeth. The school's name was changed into Teleki Blanka High School in 1950.

== Maria Dorothea Association ==
Zirzen was also associated with the creation of Maria Dorothea Association in 1885 which worked in improving the general situation of Hungarian female teachers, along with Flóris Rómer, a Benedictine monk and archaeologist, and Sándor Péterfy, a teacher at a training institute.

== Awards and honours ==
In 1877, Emperor Francis Joseph himself visited the training institute and conferred the Golden Cross of Merit with the Crown on Zirzen for recognizing her contributions in the field of women education. A teacher training college in Jászberény was also named after her.

== Death ==
Zirzen retired in 1896. She died on 28 December 1904 in Budapest.
