= Éva Takács =

Éva Takács (1780–1845), was a Hungarian publisher, writer and feminist. She was the first female publisher in Hungary, and active as a progressive feminist and a theorist of women's education. She was the mother of Teréz Karacs.
