= Ignác Martinovics =

Hungarian political activist (1755–1795)

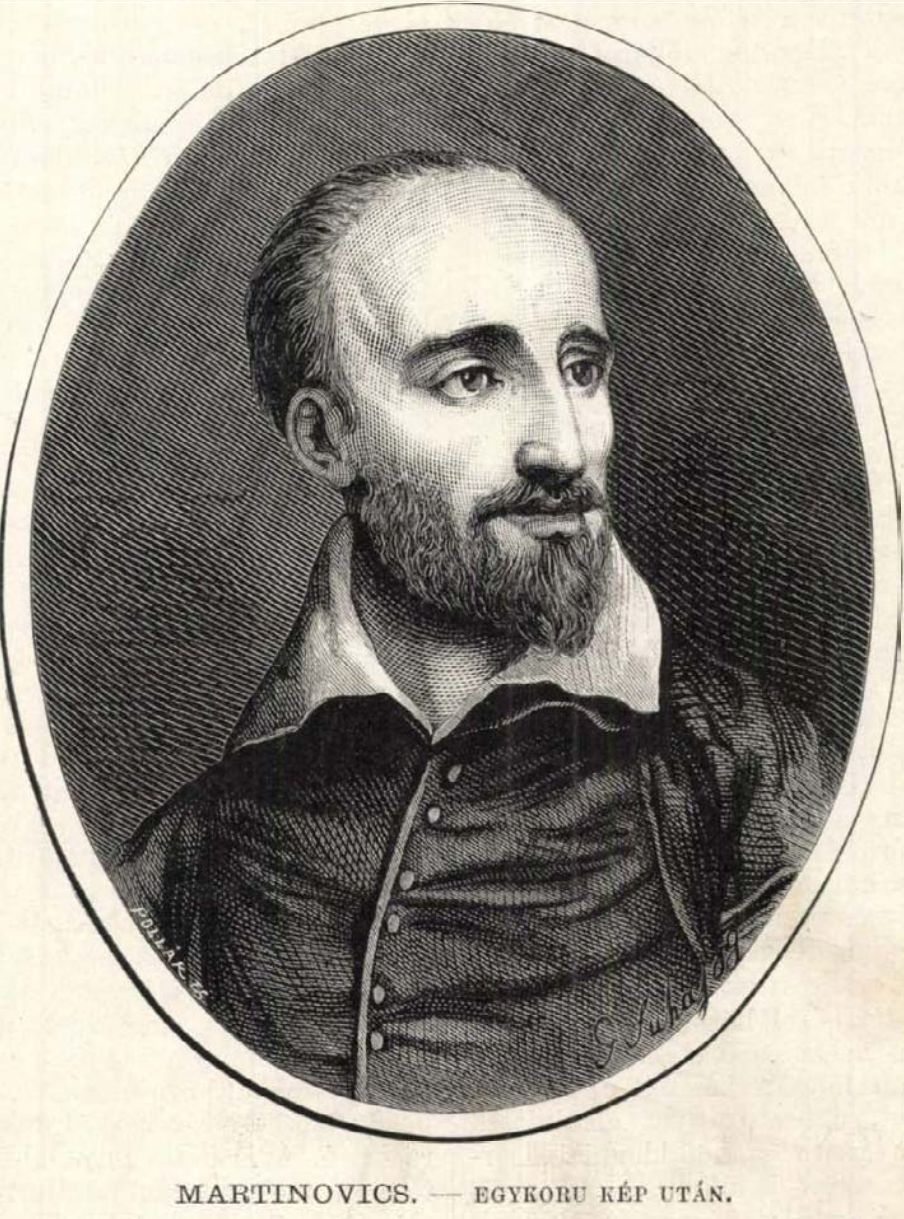
Portrait of Ignác Martinovics

Ignác Martinovics (Serbo-Croatian: Ignjat Martinović, Игњат Мартиновић; 20 July 1755 – 20 May 1795) was a Hungarian scholar, chemist, philosopher, writer, secret agent, Freemason and a leader of the Hungarian Jacobin movement. He was condemned to death for high treason and beheaded on 20 May 1795, along with count Jakab Sigray, Ferenc Szentmarjay, József Hajnóczy and others. As the founder of the Hungarian Jacobin Clubs, he was considered an idealistic forerunner of great thought by some, and an unscrupulous adventurer by others.

== Biography ==
=== Early life, education and academic career ===
His father, Mátyás Martinovics was one of the nobles who as a result of the Great Turkish War left Ottoman Serbia in 1690 under the leadership of Arsenije III Čarnojević during the Great Migrations of the Serbs and resettled in Délvidék, Hungary. He was either of Serbian or of Albanian descent. His grandparents converted from Eastern Orthodoxy to Catholicism just some years before the birth of his father Mátyás. During his lifetime, Ignác Martinovics stated that his father was either a Serb tavern keeper or an Albanian noble in military service.

Mátyás Martinovics served in the Austrian army, In November 1791, he moved to Pest. There he married Mária Poppini, a German commoner from Buda, they had five sons and two daughters.

Ignác Martinovics was born in Pest and educated by Franciscans He finished his first classes in a Piarist school and chose to enter the Franciscan order. Martinovics took theological studies in the university of Buda from 1775-1779. From 1783 he became a teacher of natural sciences at the University of Lemberg. In 1784, he became also elected a member of the Haarlem Academy, where he also received a prize. This was followed by the academies of Hessen-Homburg, Munich, Stockholm and St. Petersburg. After the death of the Holy Roman Emperor, Joseph II, in February 1790, enlightened reforms in Hungary ceased, which outraged many reform-oriented francophone intellectuals who were followers of new radical ideas based on French philosophy and enlightenment. In 1791 he was introduced to Ferenc Gotthardi, to the head of the secret police of Emperor Leopold II. Martinovics then sent reports to the secret police about secret or closed companies such as the Illuminati or Freemasons and the disbanded Jesuit order, presumably to straighten out his university career. At this time, he was able to sleep very little, read books continuously to prepare to teach at various European universities, and he had to direct and organize the work of secret agent groups traveling with him. During that time, he had to travel almost in every week, and he accomplished many missions at home and abroad.

=== Political activity and execution ===
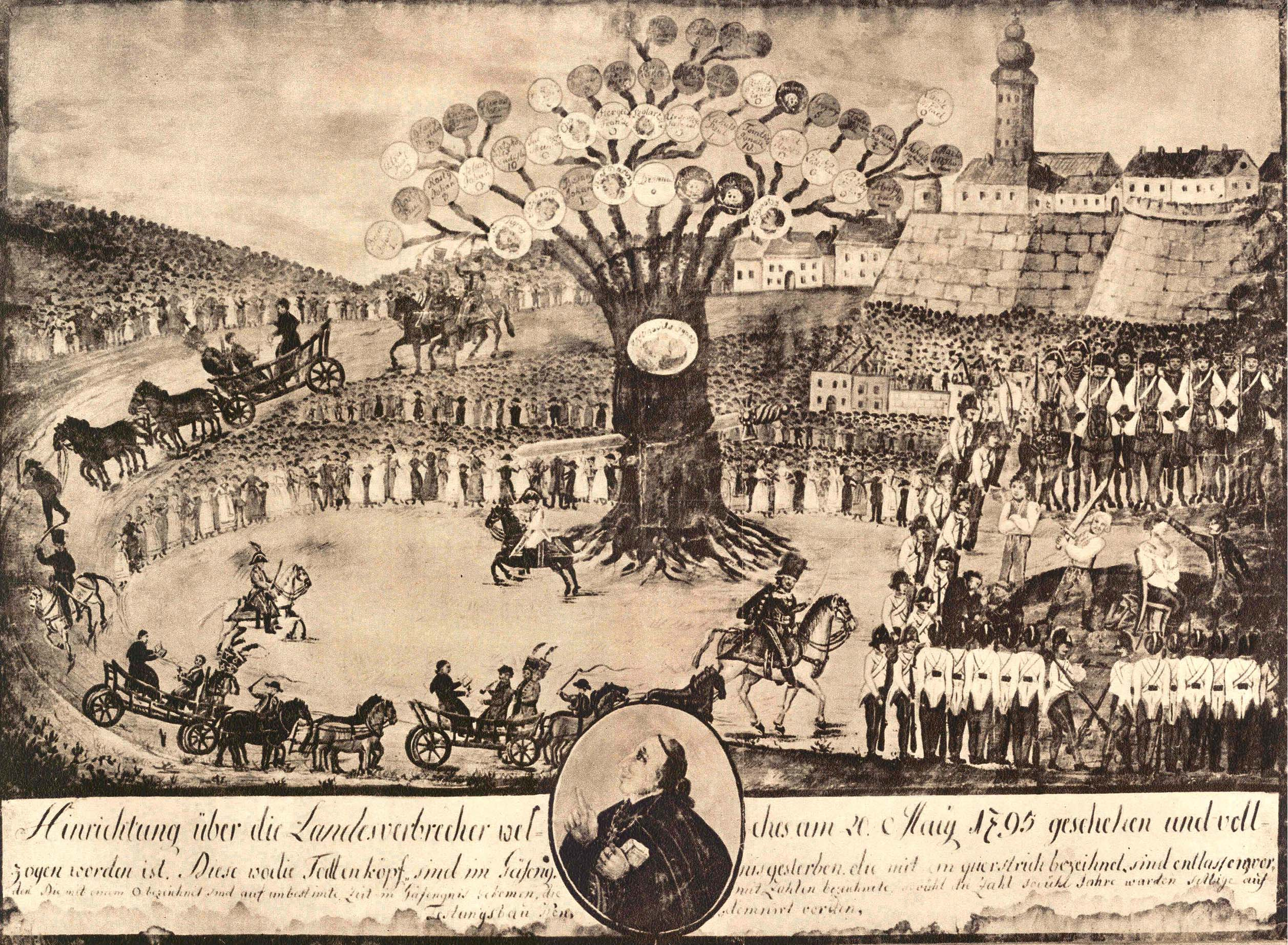
The execution of Martinovics and his comrades on the Vérmező 1795

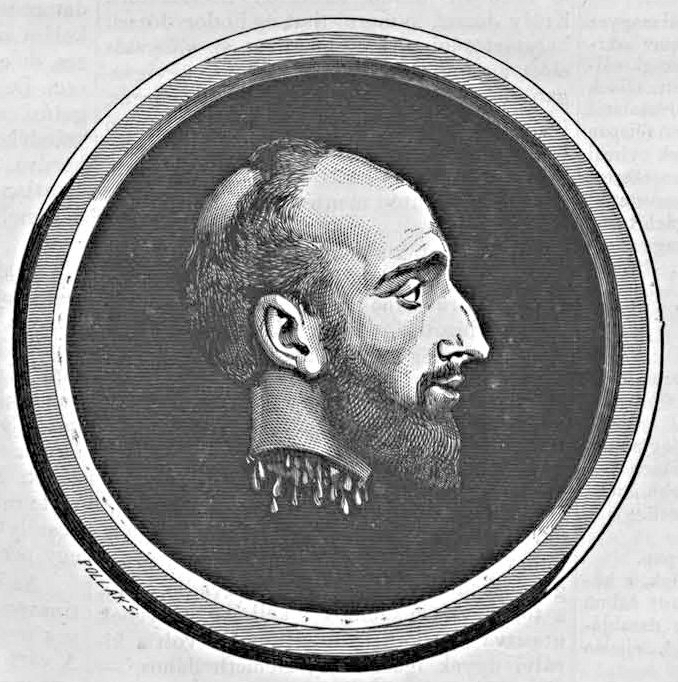
The beheaded Ignác Martinovics

Ferenc Gyurkovics, a professor of politics at the University of Pest, worked to organize a secret society to spread such ideas and also edited a revolutionary catechesis. In March 1793, Martinovics was also initiated into his plans, but Gyurkovics was unable to persuade Martinovics to join the society, and died shortly afterwards. In his testament, professor Gyurkovics left his works to Martinovics.

Martinovic's career in the secret agency became successful, he was applied as a personal secret agent by Holy Roman Emperor Leopold II until 1792. Martinovics - who sympathized with new radical liberal ideas since the beginning of his academic career - became a Freemason. Enlightened absolutism ended in Hungary under Leopold's successor, Francis II (ruled 1792–1835), who developed an almost abnormal aversion to change, bringing Hungary decades of political stagnation. The new monarch, Emperor Francis II dismissed Martinovics and his boss, Ferenc Gotthardi, the former chief of the secret police, for these subversive acts. By restricting freedom of the press, Emperor Francis II sought to prevent the spread of revolutionary ideas. The Emperor has launched an investigation against the authors of such works that have already been published and confiscated their pamphlets, including three works of Martinovics, which were published without the author's name and whose author was not even suspected at that time. However an unexpected event has radically changed his fate: He received a secret letter directly from the Paris Commune, the very center of the French Revolution, with such famous signatories like Maximilien de Robespierre, Saint-Just and Georges Danton. The letter had a flattering style, which praised his scientific career and talents, however its main purpose was to convince him - as the "most capable person in Hungary" - to organize revolutionary movements and radicalize existing societies and groups in the name of "the Rights of Man and of the Citizen" in Hungary and other Habsburg ruled areas. Martinovics could not resist such invitation, and began a wide-ranging organization movements and secret organizations, he recruited members mostly from "trustable" already existing radical societies. In his Oratio pro Leopoldo II Martinovics is explicit that only the authority that follows from a social contract should be recognized; he saw the aristocracy as the enemy of mankind, because they prevented people from becoming educated. He was in charge of stirring up a revolt against the nobility among the Hungarian serfs. In another of his works, Catechism of People and Citizens, he argued that citizens tend to oppose any repression and that sovereignty resides with the people.

In 1794 revolutionary pressure in Hungary took two forms, a nationalistic aristocratic from the less nobles and gentry and an egalitarian Jacobin form from the bourgeois. Martinovics thus he established two republican secret clubs: one for aristocratic members ("Compagnie des Réformateurs"), and one for members with bourgeois background ("Liberté Égalité Fraternité"). These societies were to have no idea of the others assistance and once the Reformers Society had finished its work it was to be liquidated by the Equality club. For each society, Martinovics wrote a separate "catechism." While both fiercely denounced the reign of Kings and Priests, the one addressed to the Reformers focused on freedom from the Hapsburgs and promised a continuation of the feudal system in contrast to the catechism addressed to the Equality Club which focused on philosophical ideas of "man" and "reason" while promising to abolish serfdom and end noble privilege. He established four territorial directorates for the secret societies, their directors were János Laczkovics, József Hajnóczy, Ferenc Szentmarjay and Jakab Sigray. Martinovics was arrested in Vienna and quickly turned on his fellow Hungarian Jacobins thereby ending the Jacobin movement in Hungary. The discovery of Martinovics' plot helped strengthen counter-revolutionary forces in the Hapsburg Empire. He was executed, together with six other prominent Jacobins, on 20 May 1795. More than 42 members of the republican secret society were arrested, including the poet János Batsányi and linguist Ferenc Kazinczy.

== Honors ==
The most important masonic lodge of Budapest belonging to the Hungarian Grand Orient is named after him. Two postage stamp were issued in his honour by Hungary; on 12 June 1919 and on 15 March 1947.

== Selected works ==
- Theoria generalis aequati onum omnium graduum, novis illustrata formulis, ac juxta principia sublimioris calculi finitorum deducta, 1780
- Tentamen publicum ex mathesi pura, 1780
- Systema universae philosophiae, 1781
- Dissertatio physica de iride et halone, 1781
- Dissertatio de harmonia naturali inter bonitatem divinam et mala creata, ad celeberrimam Hollandiae academiam Leidensem transmissa et nunc primum elucubrata, 1783
- Dissertatio de micrometro, ope cuius unus geometricus dividitur in 2.985,984 puncta quinti ordinis, 1784
- Dissertatio physica de altitudine atmospherae ex observationibus astronomicis determinata et anno 1785
- Praelectiones physicae experimentalis, 1787
- Memoires philosophiques ou la nature devoilée, 1788
- Physiologische Bemerkungen über den Menschen, 1789
- Discussio oratoria in eos, qui in librorum censuram invehuntur
- Oratio ad proceres et nobiles regni Hungariae 1790. idibus Aprilis conscripta, et Vindobonae supressa, nunc primum in lucem prodit, 1791
- Oratio pro Leopoldo II. rom. imp. aug. Hungariae, Bohemiae etc. rege ab hungaris proceribus et nobilibus accusato anno 1792
- Status regni Hungariae anno, 1792
- Franczia Catechesis, 1795
