= Zrínyi Ilona Gymnasium =

Coordinates: 48.103205753212684°N 20.765064197528584°E

- Zrínyi Ilona Gimnázium
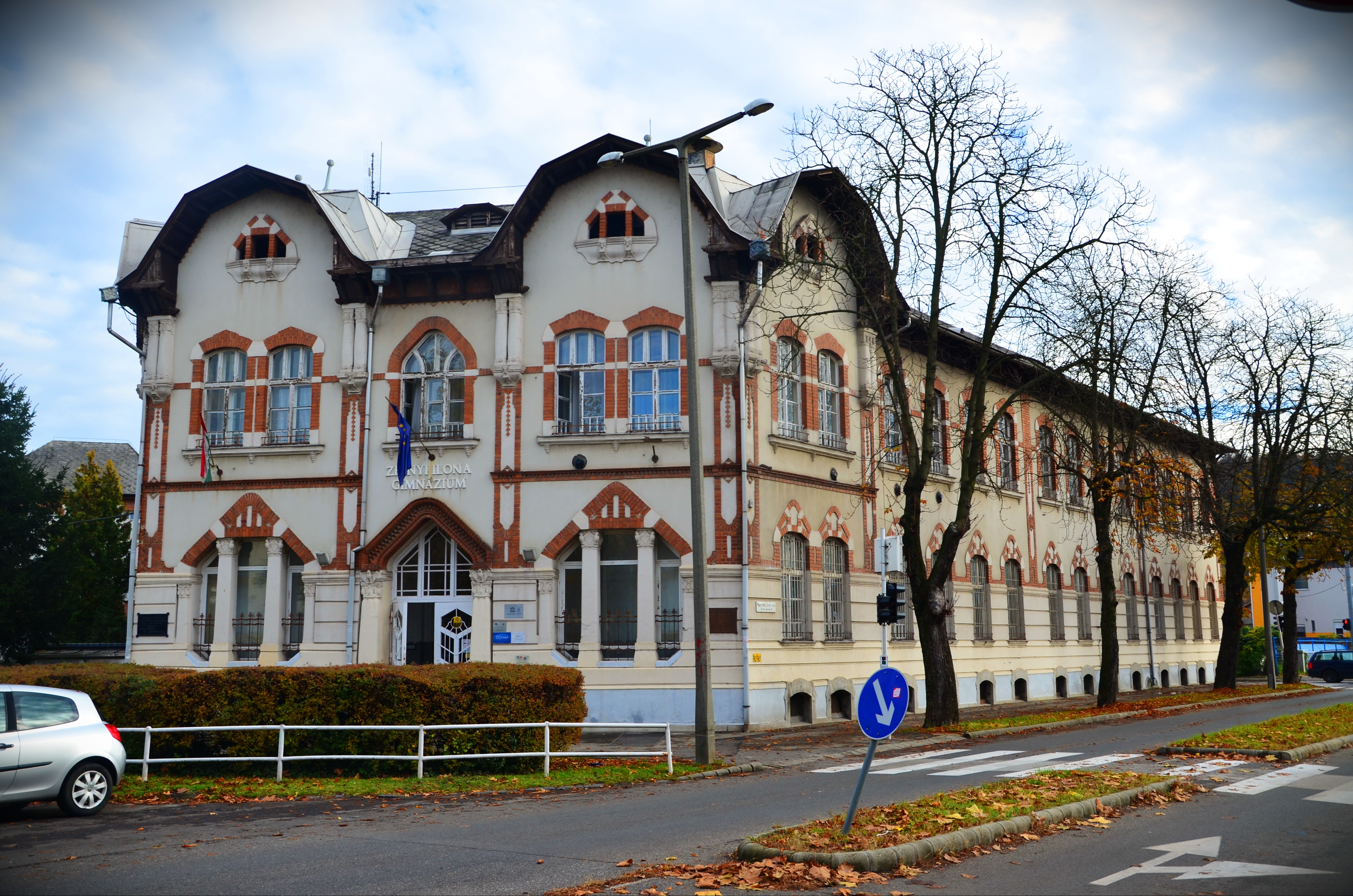
- Hungary

Information
- Established: 1846; 180 years ago
- Founder: Teréz Karacs
- Language: Hungarian
- Website: Official Website

Zrínyi Ilona Gymnasium (ZIG) (Hungarian: Zrínyi Ilona Gimnázium) is a gymnasium located in Miskolc, Borsod-Abaúj-Zemplén county, Hungary. It has a history of 160 years.

== History ==
It was founded in 1846 by the writer Teréz Karacs. She had been invited to run the school by the Calvinist church in Miskolc. She was the head until 1859 when the headmaster was Gedeon Dóczy until 1872. From 1872 it was directed by Pál Tóth for 31 years. From 1906, it became a girls' gymnasium, which was the highest school-type for girls at that time. It became an official secondary gymnasium in 1916 ending with a school-leaving exam and giving the opportunity to apply to higher education. From 1948 the school was called Tóth Pál Nőnevelő Intézeti Leánylíceum és Tanítóképző, named after its former headmaster. In the school-year of 1950/1951 the school got a new name which was Állami Vámos Ilonka Leánygimnázium. It got its final name, Zrínyi Ilona Gimnázium in 1957.Ilona Zrínyi is a heroine of Hungarian and Croatian history.

In 1961 ZIG became a UNESCO associated school which attracts international connections for its staff and students. In the 1960s modern language teaching started, students could learn English, Russian, German, French, Italian and Latin. Music and art (drawing, painting, handcrafts) classes also began. (Zrínyi Ilona Gimnázium Évkönyve 2011)

Throughout the years, the school has managed to build international connections. Students got the opportunity to visit England, Denmark, The Netherlands, France, Italy and many other countries. ZIG also joined the European Union's international program, the Socrates.

ZIG had its building in Kálvin János Street in Miskolc, but in 1995 it had to move with its 600 students, 53 teachers, educational tools and furniture. From December 1995, ZIG's address is 5, Nagyváthy János Street. The building was 87 years old then. By September, 1996 it was redecorated. The building's old secession and the modern parts create a special harmony which can be seen nowadays.

In 1998 ZIG had a construction program with a budget of 250 million Hungarian Forints. The school got a new annex which gives place for the cafeteria, a big stage with dressing rooms, computer rooms and the school's library with 2500 books in it. At the same time, not only the building was renovated and expanded, but also the teaching system. Drama department started at that time, which is one of the reasons why ZIG is a famous gymnasium in Hungary. These days four foreign languages are taught in ZIG, which are English, German, Italian and French. In 2001, the first English-Hungarian and French-Hungarian bilingual classes started, which are both five-year term trainings. At present ZIG has 50 pedagogues and 600 students in 17 classes and it is not only a girls' school anymore.
