= István Pukli =

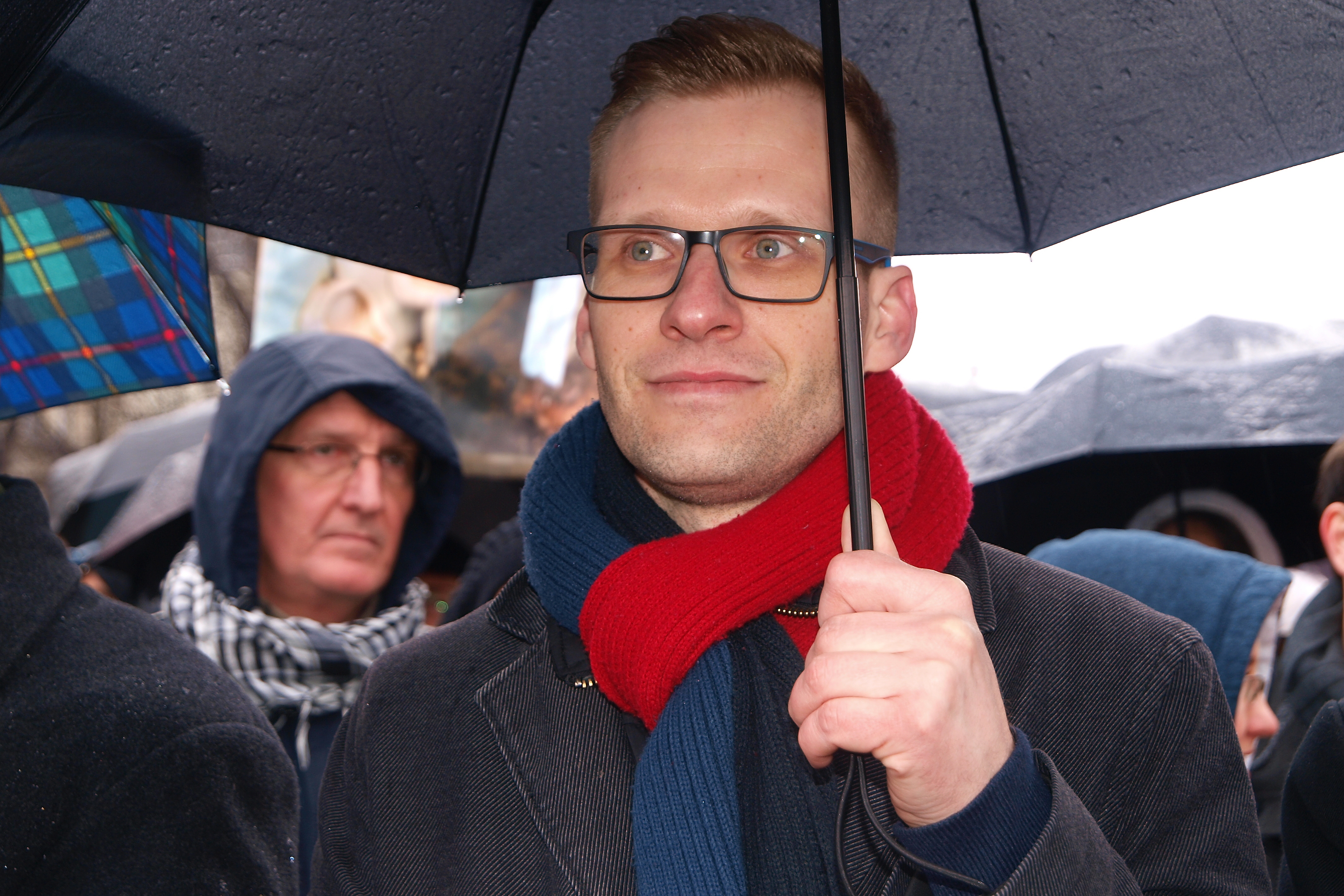
- Born: István Pukli; 1 October 1979 (age 46)

István Pukli (born 1 October 1979) is a Hungarian teacher of history and literature, esperantist, and the headmaster of the Teleki Blanka Gymnasium of Budapest.

Pukli was one of the leading figures of the 2016 teachers protests.

== Career ==
He was the director of Teleki Blanka Gymnasium.

== Publications ==
- István, Pukli; Balázs, Péterffy; Katalin, Kovács Zs. (2009). Iránytű 5: Kompetenciafejlesztő feladatsorok. Budapest: Nemzeti Tankönyvkiadó Rt. p. 160. ISBN 9789631961652.
