= Teleki Blanka Gymnasium =

Coordinates: 47°30′47″N 19°05′39″E

- Teleki Blanka Gimnázium
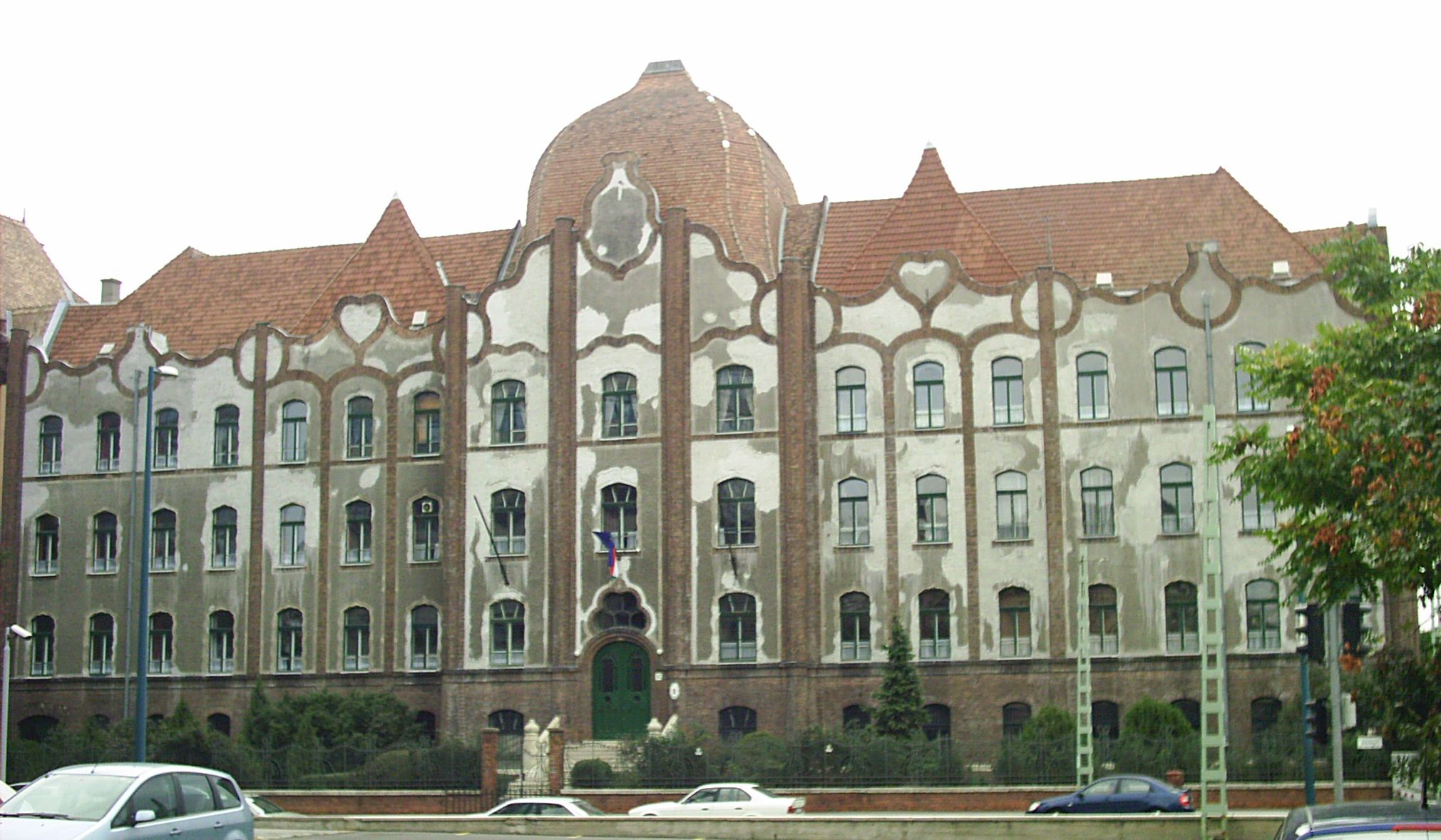
- Ajtósi Dürer sor 37. 1146 Budapest; Hungary

Information
- School type: Classical gymnasium
- Established: 1873; 153 years ago
- Founder: Janka Zirzen
- Headmaster: Gál Ferenc
- Language: Hungarian
- Campus: Urban
- Website: tbg.hu

The Teleki Blanka Gymnasium is a gymnasium located on 37 Ajtósi Dürer sor in the neighbourhood of Városliget in the XIVth district of Budapest, Hungary. The school is one of the oldest schools in the capital city of Hungary.

== History ==
After the Austro-Hungarian Compromise of 1867 education became obligatory all over Hungary which forced József baron Eötvös de Vásárosnamény to ask Janka Zirzen to organize the education of the school in 1868. So in 1873 the school started the education of teachers with an apprentice school.

In 1875, the institution moved to the modern building of Sugár út. In 1877 Janka Zirzen received the Merit Cross for her tireless work in the education of women. In 1898 the school started to use the name of Queen Elizabeth of Hungary. In 1902 the construction of the new building in Art Nouveau style (designed by Sándor Baumgartner and Zsigmond Herczeg) was finished.

In 1931 the school became a lyceum with eight classes. Due to the work of Olga Radák between 1928 and 1943 the school became famous for its excellent educational achievements. In 1950 the school changed its name into Teleki Blanka. In the 1990s the painter and holographist Attila Csáji worked in the institution.

== Notable alumni ==
- Géza Morcsányi - translator

== Directors ==
- Klára Leövey (1946-1948)
- István Pukli (2015-2016)
- Gál Ferenc (2017-2021)

== Music bands ==
- Dawnstar
