= Gabriele Baumberg =

Austrian author and poet

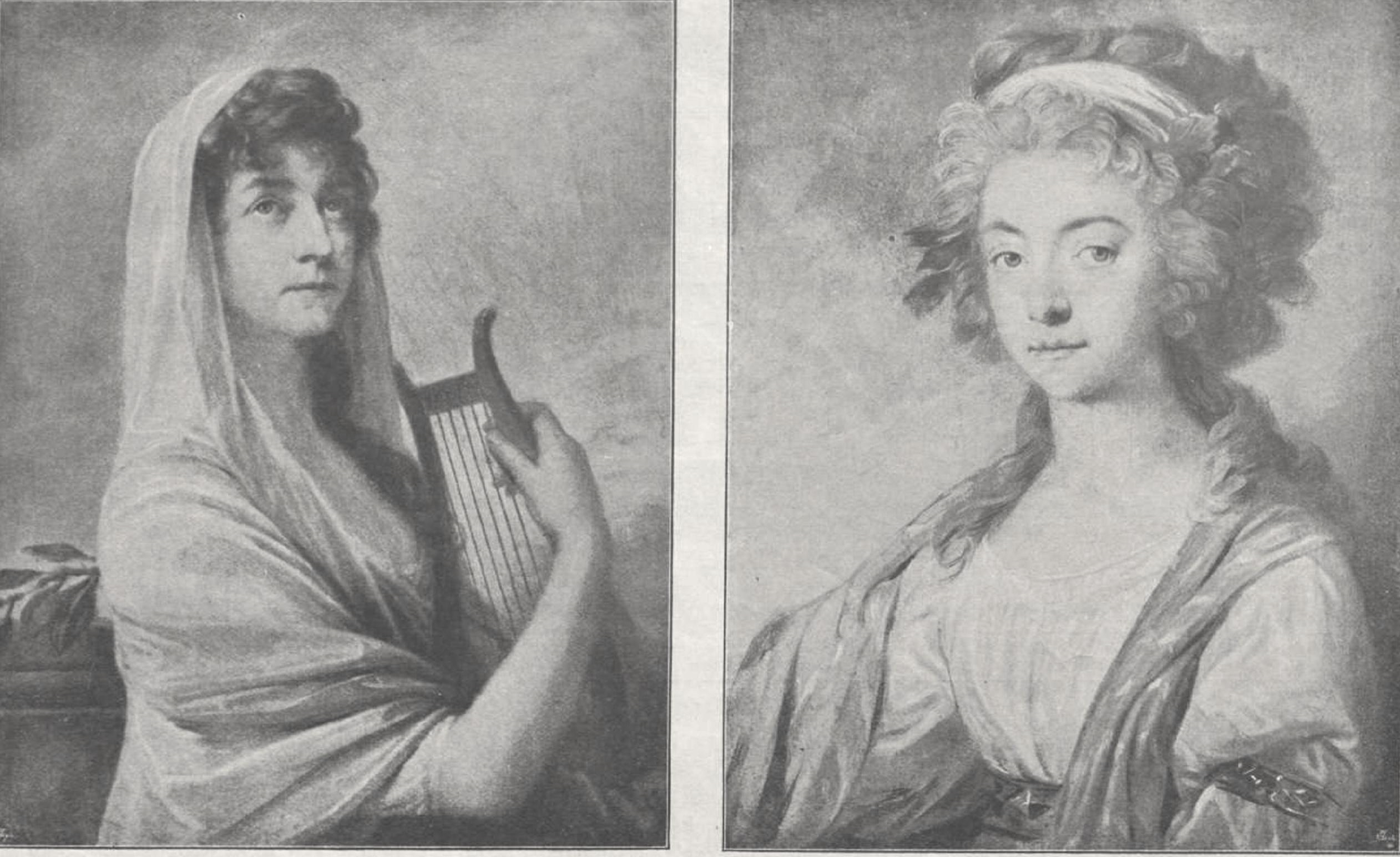
Gabriele Baumberg

Gabriele (or Gabriella) Baumberg (or Bamberg) (24 March 1766 (Note: Wurzbach 1856 and ÖBL 1957 give 1775; some sources give 1768.) – 24 July 1839), wife of János Batsányi (also Bacsányi), was an Austrian author and poet.

== Life ==
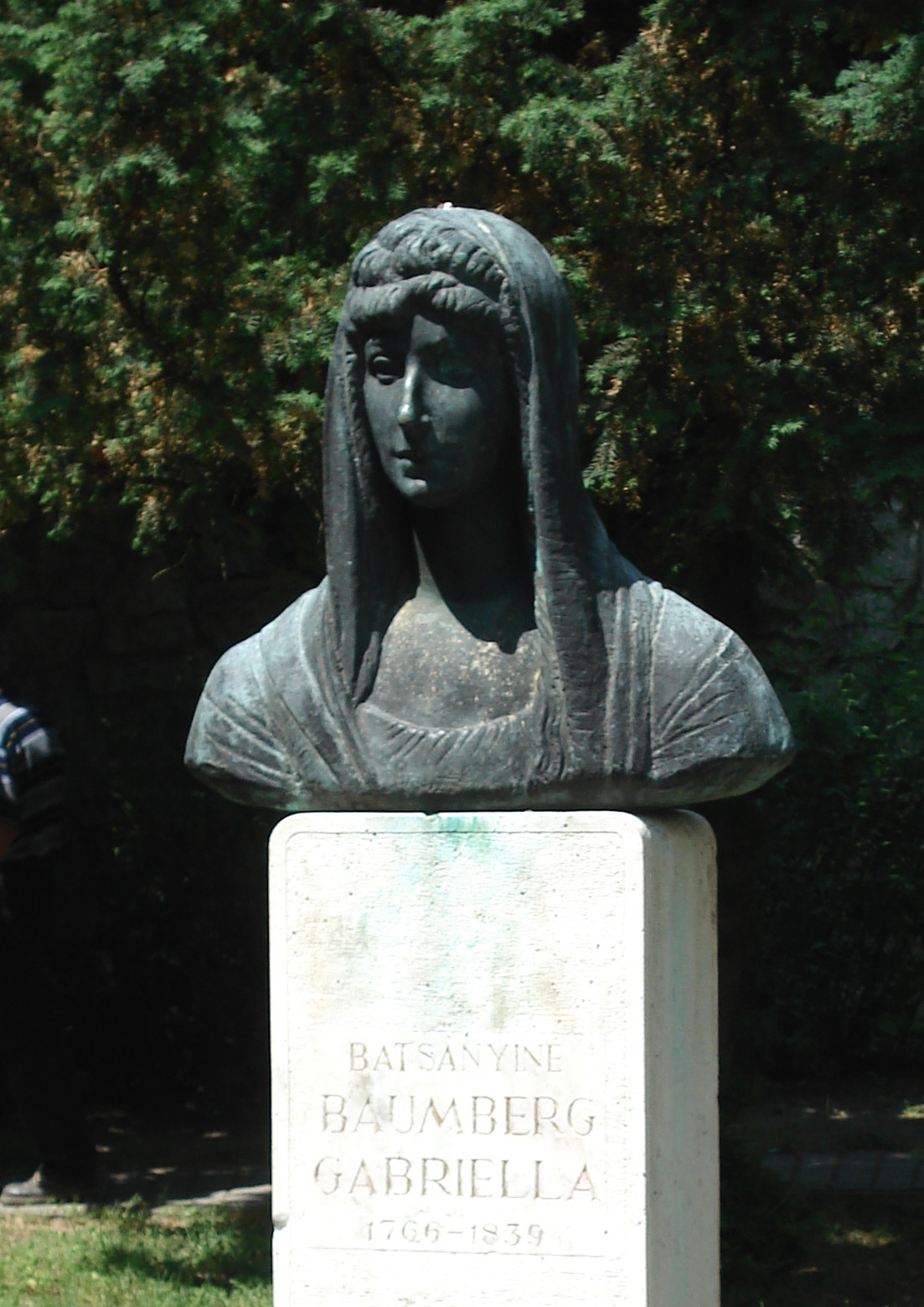
Bust of Baumberg in Tapolca, Hungary

Baumberg was born in Vienna, the daughter of an Austrian civil servant. She received a humanistic education and from early on was fascinated by literature. As a result of her interest she later frequented the literary circles of Vienna.

She married the Hungarian author János Batsányi in 1805. Her husband translated Napoleon's proclamation into Hungarian after which, as a traitor, he was obliged to flee to Paris, taking his wife with him.

After the end of the Napoleonic Wars Batsányi was handed over to the Austrian authorities, who at first imprisoned him in Vienna and then exiled him to Linz. Gabriele accompanied him to both places, and died in Linz in 1839.

She wrote short poems and prose pieces throughout her life. Several of Baumberg's poems were set to music by W. A. Mozart, Franz Xaver Mozart, and Schubert. In 1793, she set the theme of the first movement of Haydn's String Quartet, Op. 50, No. 1 to words, for inscription on a monument honouring Haydn in the composer's home town of Rohrau, Austria.

== Selected works ==
- Sämmtliche Gedichte (1800) [Complete Poems], online (in German)
- Amor und Hymen (1807) (volume of poetry)
