= János Batsányi =

Hungarian poet

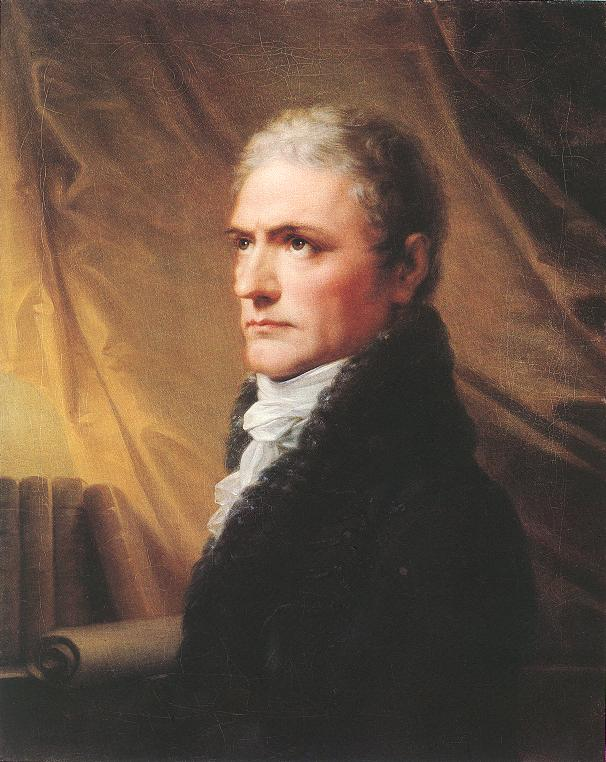
- János Batsányi by Friedrich Heinrich Füger, 1808 (Hungarian National Museum, Budapest)
- Born: 9 May 1763; Tapolca, Kingdom of Hungary
- Died: 12 May 1845 (aged 82); Linz, Austrian Empire
- Occupation: Poet
- Notable work: The Valour of the Magyars
- Spouse: Gabriella Baumberg

János Batsányi (9 May 1763 in Tapolca – 12 May 1845 in Linz), husband of Gabriella Baumberg, was a Hungarian poet.

In 1785, he published his first work, a patriotic poem, "The Valour of the Magyars". In the same year he obtained a job as clerk in the treasury of the Hungarian city of Kassa (Košice), and there, in conjunction with other two Hungarian patriots, edited the Magyar Museum, which was suppressed by the government in 1792.

In the following year he was deprived of his clerkship and in 1794, having taken part in the conspiracy of Ignác Martinovics, he was thrown into the state prison of the Kufstein Fortress, where he remained for two years.

After his release, he took a considerable share in the Magyar Minerva, a literary review, and then proceeded to Vienna, where he obtained a post in the bank. He married Gabriella Baumberg, (Note: aka Gabriele von Baumberg) a renowned poet from Vienna in 1805. Four years later, he translated Napoleon's proclamation to the Hungarians, and, in consequence of this anti-Habsburg act, had to take refuge in Paris.

After the fall of Napoleon he was given up to the Austrians, who allowed him to reside at Linz until his death, on condition that he never left town. He published a collection of poems at Pest in 1827, and also edited the poetical works of Pál Ányos and Ferenc Faludi.

== Notes and references ==
=== Notes ===
==== Sources ====
- Chisholm, Hugh, ed. (1911). "Bacsanyi, Janos" . Encyclopædia Britannica (11th ed.). Cambridge University Press.
