= Teréz Karacs =

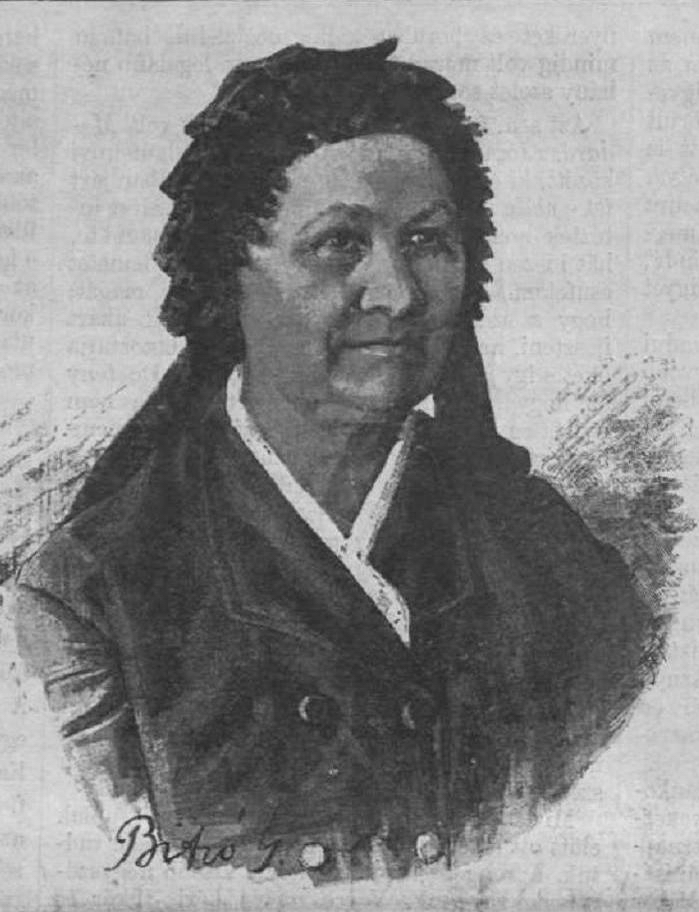
- Born: 18 April 1808; Pest
- Died: 2 October 1892 (aged 84); Békés

Teréz Karacs (18 April 1808 – 2 October 1892) was a Hungarian writer, educator, memoirist, and women's rights activist. She was a leading figure in the early feminist movement in Hungary, as well as the general social reform movement, and a famous literary writer of contemporary Hungary. A pioneer of women's education, she was the founder of the Zrínyi Ilona Grammar School in the north-east of Hungary.

== Life ==
Karacs was born in Pest on the 18 April 1808. Her mother, Eva Takacs, was an advocate for women's rights and her father, Ferenc Karacs, was an engraver and engineer. The Protestant family home was a meeting place for intellectuals. She was the second of six children and was given her primary education in a school in Pest from 1814 to 1819, She then educated herself as an autodidact, although she also had to care for her younger siblings. Karacs was particularly inspired by a ten-month trip as a teenager to Vienna in 1824.

Hungarian female writers who insisted on professional status were rare in the nineteenth century, but from 1822 onwards, Karacs published poems, riddles, novels and other writings, becoming a well known literary figure in Hungary, and regularly contributing to literary journals. In 1838–1844, she supported herself as a housekeeper in an aristocratic household, but she continued her literary career at the same time. Karacs became an advocate for reform in women's rights like her mother had been. As a women's rights activist, she focused on equal educational rights for both boys and girls, and advocated that spinsters should be self-supporting professionals.

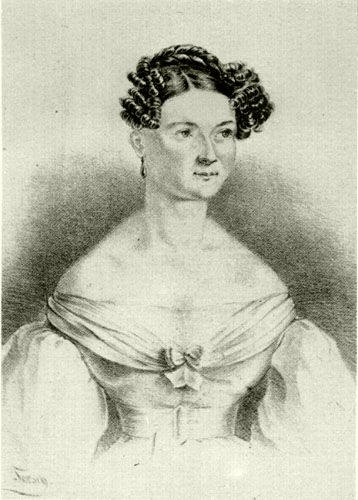
Karacs in 1850

Countess Blanka Teleki came from an aristocratic family who had an estate in Szatmár County. She contacted Karacs and invited her to Budapest. Teleki tried to persuade her to lead a school for upper-class girls, but Karacs would not agree to Teleki's approach. Despite her objection, Karacs supported the Countess's initiative actively and proposed another woman, Klára Leövey, to be the head of the aristocratic school.

Between 1846 and 1859, Karacs managed her own school for girls in Miskolc. The school had four female teachers and the three year long curriculum included Hungarian, German, arithmetic, housekeeping and sewing. During this time Karacs supported her local community by supplying the working people of Diósgyőr with copies of revolutionary newspapers before the revolution in 1848. She also published a collection of short romantic stories in 1853. In 1865–1877, she worked as a private teacher in Budapest. Her reputation led to her being invited to be a tutor to King Louis Philippe's grandchild. However Karacs had been invited to run the school by the Calvinist church in Miskolc and she became the head of the Zrínyi Ilona Grammar School for girls until 1859.

In 1877 she moved to Kiskunhalas to cut her costs and lived with relatives. During the 1880s her memoirs were published in journals where they were critically acclaimed. She died on 2 October 1892 in Békés in Hungary.

== Legacy ==
The grammar school that she founded is still in operation. In 1993 a biography of her life was published. In 1985 another school in Hungary took the name of Karacs Teréz Középiskolai Leánykollégium after Karacs.
