= Festungsbahn (Kufstein) =

Funicular in Kufstein, Austria

Coordinates: 47°34′55″N 12°10′10″E

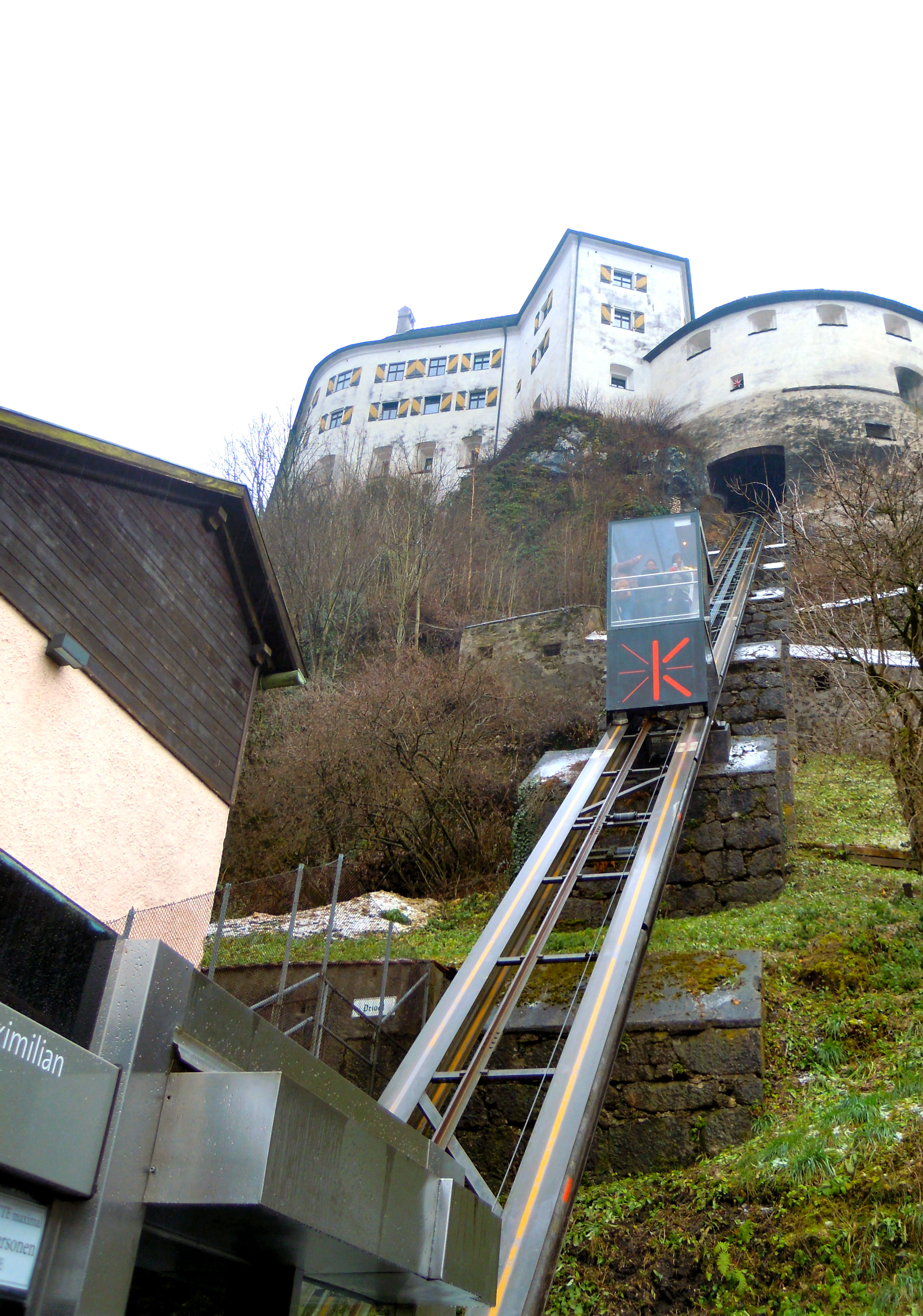
The Kaiser Maximilian Funicular at Kufstein Fortress in 2016

The Festungsbahn is a funicular railway, or inclined lift, which links Kufstein Fortress with the town of Kufstein below. The carriage holds a maximum of eight people at a time. Named after Emperor Maximilian I, the Kaiser Maximilian Funicular is on the site of the former hoist up to the fortress. The hoist is thought to have been built in the 17th century and was used to transport food, supplies and artillery up to the fortress. The hoist was closed and dismantled in 1965. The funicular opened in 1999 and has two stations, the Festungsneuhof at the bottom and the Schlossrondell at the top.

The funicular does not have a driver and is operated by pressing either the 'up' or 'down' buttons inside the carriage. The track is 50 metres (160 ft) long.
