= Klára Leövey =

Hungarian educator and women's rights activist

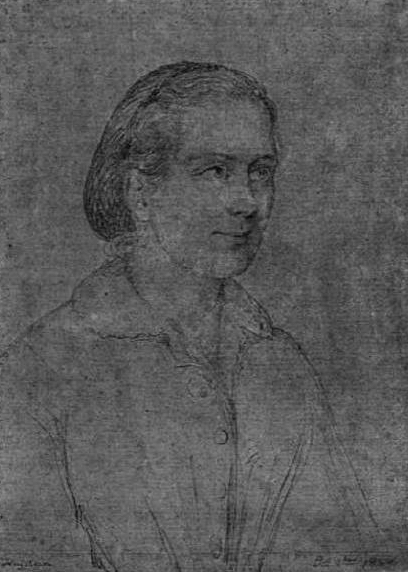

Klára Leövey (1821–1897), was a Hungarian pioneer educator and women's rights activist. She was the manager of the Teleki Blanka Gymnasium in Budapest from 1846 to 1848 after being recommended by Teréz Karacs. She participated in the Hungarian Revolution of 1848, and because of this she was imprisoned by the Austrians. After her release, she lived in exile in Paris from 1856 to 1862.

In 2018, the asteroid 334756 Leövey, discovered by Krisztián Sárneczky and Brigitta Sipőcz at the Piszkéstető Station in 2003, was named after her.
